= Nmixx discography =

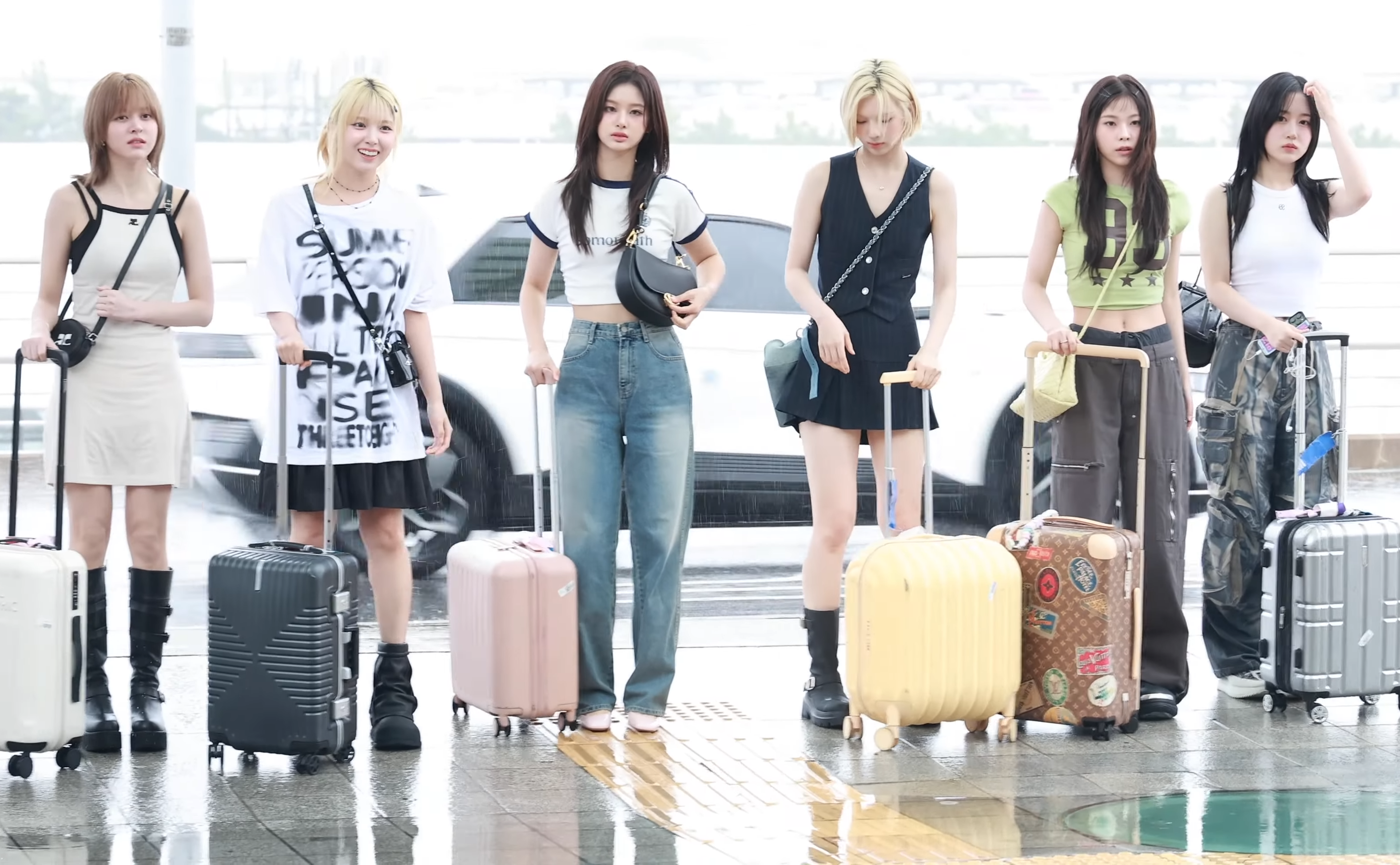
- Nmixx in July 2024
- Studio albums: 1
- EPs: 6
- Single albums: 3
- Singles: 16
- Promotional singles: 3
- Soundtrack appearances: 2

South Korean girl group Nmixx has released one studio album, six extended plays, three single albums, sixteen singles, three promotional singles, and two soundtracks.

The group made their debut in February 2022, with the single album Ad Mare. Ad Mare debuted at number 3 on the Gaon Album Chart, and went on to top the chart on its third week of release. By the end of the year, Ad Mare had sold approximately 500,000 copies, and received a 2× platinum certification from the Korea Music Content Association in South Korea. Their first extended play, Expérgo, is their most commercially successful album to date as of December 2024, having sold approximately 950,000 copies and receiving a 3× platinum certification in South Korea.

== Studio albums ==
List of studio albums, showing selected details, selected chart positions, sales figures, and certifications
Title	Details	Peak chart positions					Sales	Certifications
Title	Details	KOR	JPN	JPN Hot	US	US World	Sales	Certifications
Blue Valentine	Released: October 13, 2025; Label: JYP, Republic; Formats: CD, digital download, LP, streaming	2	31	40	177	2	KOR: 685,680; JPN: 2,365	KMCA: 2× Platinum

== Extended plays ==
List of extended plays, showing selected details, selected chart positions, sales figures, and certifications
Title	Details	Peak chart positions								Sales	Certifications
Title	Details	KOR	CRO	FRA	GRC	HUN	JPN	US	US World	Sales	Certifications
Expérgo	Released: March 20, 2023; Label: JYP; Formats: CD, digital download, streaming	2	—	—	—	22	8	122	5	KOR: 953,087; JPN: 10,691	KMCA: 3× Platinum
Fe3O4: Break	Released: January 15, 2024; Label: JYP, Republic; Formats: CD, digital download, streaming	1	1	185	—	—	17	171	2	KOR: 781,710; JPN: 6,644	KMCA: 3× Platinum
Fe3O4: Stick Out	Released: August 19, 2024; Label: JYP, Republic; Formats: CD, digital download, streaming	1	25	—	49	—	25	— (Note: Fe3O4: Stick Out did not enter the Billboard 200, but peaked at number 15 on the Top Album Sales.)	5	KOR: 648,880; JPN: 3,208	KMCA: 2× Platinum
Fe3O4: Forward	Released: March 17, 2025; Label: JYP, Republic; Formats: CD, digital download, streaming	1	—	—	21	—	15	— (Note: Fe3O4: Forward did not enter the Billboard 200, but peaked at number 16 on the Top Album Sales.)	6	KOR: 746,276; JPN: 7,172	KMCA: 2× Platinum
Heavy Serenade	Released: May 11, 2026; Label: JYP, Republic; Formats: CD, digital download, streaming	1	—	176	—	—	35	182	3	KOR: 389,437	KMCA: Platinum
Strange Muse	Released: October 19, 2026; Label: JYP, Republic; Formats: CD, digital download, LP, streaming	2	—	—	—	—	—	— (Note: Strange Muse did not enter the Billboard 200, but peaked at number 11 on the Top Album Sales.)	3	KOR: 395,079	
"—" denotes a recording that did not chart or was not released in that territory

== Single albums ==
List of single albums, showing selected details, selected chart positions, sales figures, and certifications
Title	Details	Peak chart positions			Sales	Certifications
Title	Details	KOR	JPN Comb	JPN Hot	Sales	Certifications
Ad Mare	Released: February 22, 2022; Label: JYP; Formats: CD, digital download, streaming	1	29	—	KOR: 498,432	KMCA: 2× Platinum
Entwurf	Released: September 19, 2022; Label: JYP; Formats: CD, digital download, streaming	1	—	53	KOR: 562,596	KMCA: 2× Platinum
A Midsummer Nmixx's Dream	Released: July 11, 2023; Label: JYP, Republic; Formats: CD, digital download, streaming	3	—	—	KOR: 859,961	KMCA: 3× Platinum
"—" denotes a recording that did not chart or was not released in that territory

== Singles ==
List of singles, showing year released, selected chart positions, and name of the album
Title	Year	Peak chart positions										Album
Title	Year	KOR	KOR Billb. (Note: Includes the Billboard K-pop Hot 100 (2011–2022), South Korea Songs (2022–2024), and Billboard Korea Hot 100: (2025–present).)	JPN Comb	JPN Hot	MLY	SGP	SGP Songs	TWN	VIE	WW	Album
"O.O"	2022	81	63	— (Note: "O.O" did not enter the Oricon Combined Singles Chart, but peaked at number 35 on the Oricon Streaming Chart.)	42	8	16	18	—	38	138	Ad Mare
"Dice"	2022	49	16	39	56	—	20	23	—	74	155	Entwurf
"Funky Glitter Christmas"	2022	— (Note: "Funky Glitter Christmas" did not enter the Circle Digital Chart, but peaked at number 33 on the Download Chart.)	—	—	—	—	—	—	—	—	—	Non-album single
"Young, Dumb, Stupid"	2023	50	—	—	—	—	— (Note: "Young, Dumb, Stupid" did not enter RIAS Top Streaming Chart, but peaked at number 17 on the Top Regional Chart.)	—	—	—	—	Expérgo
"Love Me Like This"	2023	11	11	—	—	—	30	—	—	—	—	Expérgo
"Roller Coaster"	2023	100	23	—	—	—	—	—	—	—	—	A Midsummer Nmixx's Dream
"Party O'Clock"	2023	139	—	—	—	—	—	—	—	—	—	A Midsummer Nmixx's Dream
"Soñar (Breaker)" (Note: The Spanish version of "Soñar" was released on October 11, 2024.)	2023	111	—	—	—	—	—	—	—	—	—	Fe3O4: Break
"Dash"	2024	75	—	—	—	—	—	—	—	—	— (Note: "Dash" did not enter the Billboard Global 200, but peaked at number 181 on the Global Excl. US.)	Fe3O4: Break
"See That?" (별별별)	2024	22	24	—	—	—	—	—	—	—	—	Fe3O4: Stick Out
"High Horse"	2025	— (Note: "High Horse" did not enter the Circle Digital Chart, but peaked at number 23 on the Download Chart.)	—	—	—	—	—	—	—	—	—	Fe3O4: Forward
"Know About Me"	2025	78	—	—	—	—	—	—	14	—	—	Fe3O4: Forward
"Blue Valentine"	2025	1	5	—	—	—	— (Note: "Blue Valentine" did not enter the Official Singapore Chart, but peaked at number 13 on the Regional Chart.)	—	8	—	59	Blue Valentine
"Tic Tic" (featuring Pabllo Vittar)	2026	— (Note: "Tic Tic" did not enter the Circle Digital Chart, but peaked at number 33 on the Download Chart.)	—	—	—	—	—	—	—	—	—	Non-album single
"Heavy Serenade"	2026	8	—	—	—	—	— (Note: "Heavy Serenade" did not enter the Official Singapore Chart, but peaked at number 18 on the Regional Chart.)	—	1	—	— (Note: "Heavy Serenade" did not enter the Billboard Global 200, but peaked at number 138 on the Global Excl. US.)	Heavy Serenade
"Birthday Wish" (긴 소원)	2026	24	—	—	—	—	—	—	8	—	—	Strange Muse
"—" denotes a recording that did not chart or was not released in that territory. "*" denotes a chart did not exist at that time.

=== Promotional singles ===
List of promotional singles, showing year released, selected chart positions, and name of the album
Title	Year	Peak chart positions	Album
Title	Year	KOR DL	Album
"Kiss" (Rainbow cover)	2022	55	Non-album singles
"Like Magic" (with J.Y. Park, Stray Kids and Itzy)	2024	63	Non-album singles
"Feifei" (蜚蜚)	2024	—	Non-album singles
"—" denotes a recording that did not chart or was not released in that territory.

=== Soundtrack appearances ===
List of soundtrack appearances, showing year released, and name of the album
Title	Year	Album
"Hey Gabby! " (안녕 개비!)	2022	Gabby's Dollhouse OST x Nmixx
"Sprinkle Party" (스프링클 파티)	2022	Gabby's Dollhouse OST x Nmixx
"Caution" (with Anderson .Paak)	2026	K-Pops! (Music from and inspired by K-Pops! Motion Picture)

=== Collaborations ===
List of collaborations, showing year released, selected chart positions, and name of the album
Title	Year	Peak chart positions	Album
Title	Year	KOR DL	Album
"Come On" (with Dimitri Vegas & Like Mike)	2024	172	Non-album singles
"Mexe" (with Pabllo Vittar)	2025	—	Non-album singles
"—" denotes a recording that did not chart or was not released in that territory.

== Other charted songs ==
List of other charted songs, showing year released, selected chart positions, and name of the album
Title	Year	Peak chart positions	Album
Title	Year	KOR	Album
"Tank" (占)	2022	— (Note: "Tank" did not enter the Circle Digital Chart, but peaked at number 121 on the Download Chart.)	Ad Mare
"Cool (Your Rainbow)"	2022	— (Note: "Cool (Your Rainbow)" did not enter the Circle Digital Chart, but peaked at number 39 on the Download Chart.)	Entwurf
"Paxxword"	2023	— (Note: "Paxxword" did not enter the Circle Digital Chart, but peaked at number 61 on the Download Chart.)	Expérgo
"Just Did It"	2023	— (Note: "Just Did It" did not enter the Circle Digital Chart, but peaked at number 65 on the Download Chart.)	Expérgo
"My Gosh"	2023	— (Note: "My Gosh" did not enter the Circle Digital Chart, but peaked at number 66 on the Download Chart.)	Expérgo
"Home"	2023	— (Note: "Home" did not enter the Circle Digital Chart, but peaked at number 72 on the Download Chart.)	Expérgo
"Run for Roses"	2024	— (Note: "Run for Roses" did not enter the Circle Digital Chart, but peaked at number 39 on the Download Chart.)	Fe3O4: Break
"Boom"	2024	— (Note: "Bloom" did not enter the Circle Digital Chart, but peaked at number 62 on the Download Chart.)	Fe3O4: Break
"Passionfruit"	2024	— (Note: "Passionfruit" did not enter the Circle Digital Chart, but peaked at number 59 on the Download Chart.)	Fe3O4: Break
"XOXO"	2024	— (Note: "XOXO" did not enter the Circle Digital Chart, but peaked at number 65 on the Download Chart.)	Fe3O4: Break
"Break the Wall"	2024	— (Note: "Break the Wall" did not enter the Circle Digital Chart, but peaked at number 58 on the Download Chart.)	Fe3O4: Break
"Sickuhh" (featuring Kid Milli)	2024	— (Note: "Sickuhh" did not enter the Circle Digital Chart, but peaked at number 20 on the Download Chart.)	Fe3O4: Stick Out
"Red Light Sign, But We Go"	2024	— (Note: "Red Light Sign, But We Go" did not enter the Circle Digital Chart, but peaked at number 25 on the Download Chart.)	Fe3O4: Stick Out
"Beat Beat"	2024	— (Note: "Beat Beat" did not enter the Circle Digital Chart, but peaked at number 22 on the Download Chart.)	Fe3O4: Stick Out
"Moving On"	2024	— (Note: "Moving On" did not enter the Circle Digital Chart, but peaked at number 24 on the Download Chart.)	Fe3O4: Stick Out
"Love Is Lonely"	2024	— (Note: "Love Is Lonely" did not enter the Circle Digital Chart, but peaked at number 19 on the Download Chart.)	Fe3O4: Stick Out
"Slingshot (<★)"	2025	— (Note: "Slingshot (<★)" did not enter the Circle Digital Chart, but peaked at number 48 on the Download Chart.)	Fe3O4: Forward
"Golden Recipe"	2025	— (Note: "Golden Recipe" did not enter the Circle Digital Chart, but peaked at number 53 on the Download Chart.)	Fe3O4: Forward
"Papillon"	2025	— (Note: "Papillon" did not enter the Circle Digital Chart, but peaked at number 45 on the Download Chart.)	Fe3O4: Forward
"Ocean"	2025	— (Note: "Ocean" did not enter the Circle Digital Chart, but peaked at number 46 on the Download Chart.)	Fe3O4: Forward
"Spinnin' On It"	2025	102	Blue Valentine
"Phoenix"	2025	— (Note: "Phoenix" did not enter the Circle Digital Chart, but peaked at number 23 on the Download Chart.)	Blue Valentine
"Reality Hurts"	2025	— (Note: "Reality Hurts" did not enter the Circle Digital Chart, but peaked at number 33 on the Download Chart.)	Blue Valentine
"Rico"	2025	— (Note: "Rico" did not enter the Circle Digital Chart, but peaked at number 29 on the Download Chart.)	Blue Valentine
"Game Face"	2025	— (Note: "Game Face" did not enter the Circle Digital Chart, but peaked at number 27 on the Download Chart.)	Blue Valentine
"Podium"	2025	— (Note: "Podium" did not enter the Circle Digital Chart, but peaked at number 23 on the Download Chart.)	Blue Valentine
"Crush On You"	2025	— (Note: "Crush On You" did not enter the Circle Digital Chart, but peaked at number 26 on the Download Chart.)	Blue Valentine
"Adore U"	2025	— (Note: "Adore U" did not enter the Circle Digital Chart, but peaked at number 25 on the Download Chart.)	Blue Valentine
"Shape of Love"	2025	— (Note: "Shape of Love" did not enter the Circle Digital Chart, but peaked at number 24 on the Download Chart.)	Blue Valentine
"O.O Pt. 1 (Baila)"	2025	— (Note: "O.O Pt. 1 (Baila)" did not enter the Circle Digital Chart, but peaked at number 40 on the Download Chart.)	Blue Valentine
"O.O Pt. 2 (Superhero)"	2025	— (Note: "O.O Pt. 2 (Superhero)" did not enter the Circle Digital Chart, but peaked at number 31 on the Download Chart.)	Blue Valentine
"Blue Valentine" (English ver.)	2025	— (Note: "Blue Valentine" (English ver.) did not enter the Circle Digital Chart, but peaked at number 187 on the Download Chart.)	Non-album single
"Crescendo"	2026	154	Heavy Serenade
"Ideserveit"	2026	— (Note: "Ideserveit" did not enter the Circle Digital Chart, but peaked at number 18 on the Download Chart.)	Heavy Serenade
"Different Girl"	2026	— (Note: "Different Girl" did not enter the Circle Digital Chart, but peaked at number 20 on the Download Chart.)	Heavy Serenade
"Superior"	2026	— (Note: "Superior" did not enter the Circle Digital Chart, but peaked at number 19 on the Download Chart.)	Heavy Serenade
"Loud"	2026	— (Note: "Loud" did not enter the Circle Digital Chart, but peaked at number 17 on the Download Chart.)	Heavy Serenade
"Kerosene"	2026	— (Note: "Kerosene" did not enter the Circle Digital Chart, but peaked at number 34 on the Download Chart.)	Strange Muse
"Rude Talk"	2026	— (Note: "Rude Talk" did not enter the Circle Digital Chart, but peaked at number 29 on the Download Chart.)	Strange Muse
"Sing to the Moon" (Lily & Haewon)	2026	— (Note: "Sing to the Moon" did not enter the Circle Digital Chart, but peaked at number 31 on the Download Chart.)	Strange Muse
"Hot 'n Unbothered" (Sullyoon & Bae)	2026	— (Note: "Hot 'n Unbothered" did not enter the Circle Digital Chart, but peaked at number 36 on the Download Chart.)	Strange Muse
"Whip" (Jiwoo & Kyujin)	2026	— (Note: "Whip" did not enter the Circle Digital Chart, but peaked at number 38 on the Download Chart.)	Strange Muse
"—" denotes a recording that did not chart.
