= Haewon =

Haewon may refer to:

- Hae-won, a Korean given name
- Haewon (singer) (born 2003), the leader of the girl group Nmixx
- Haewon, a teaching of Jeung San Do
