= Hae-won =

- Hangul: 해원
- RR: Haewon
- MR: Haewŏn
- IPA: [hɛwʌn]

Hae-won, also spelled Hay-won, is a Korean given name.

People with this name include:

- Yi Hae-won (1919–2020), Korean royal
- Chung Hae-won (born 1959), South Korean football coach
- Kim Hae-won (born 1986), South Korean football player
- Yoo Hae-won (born 1992), South Korean badminton player
- Haewon Song, South Korean pianist
- Oh Hae-won (born 2003), South Korean singer, leader and member of Nmixx

Fictional characters with this name include:

- Ban Hae-won, in 2004 South Korean film Temptation of Wolves
- Park Hae-won, in 2006 South Korean television series One Fine Day
- Hae-won, in 2010 South Korean film Bedevilled
- Kim Hae-won, in 2010 South Korean film Acoustic
- Haewon, in 2013 South Korean film Nobody's Daughter Haewon
- Eun Hae-won, in 2013 South Korean film Steel Cold Winter
- Cha Hae-won, in 2014 South Korean television series Wonderful Days
- Hae Won, in 2015 American film The Nest

== See also ==
- List of Korean given names
