= Young & Dumb =

Young & Dumb may refer to:

- "Young & Dumb" (song) by Avril Lavigne and Simple Plan
- "Young & Dumb" by Cigarettes After Sex from their album Cigarettes After Sex
- "Young & Dumb" by Girlset
- "Young n Dumb" by Polo G from Hall of Fame 2.0

== See also ==
- "Young Dumb & Broke" by Khalid
- "Young, Dumb, Stupid" by Nmixx
