= List of Show Champion Chart winners (2023) =

Show Champion Chart winners (2023)

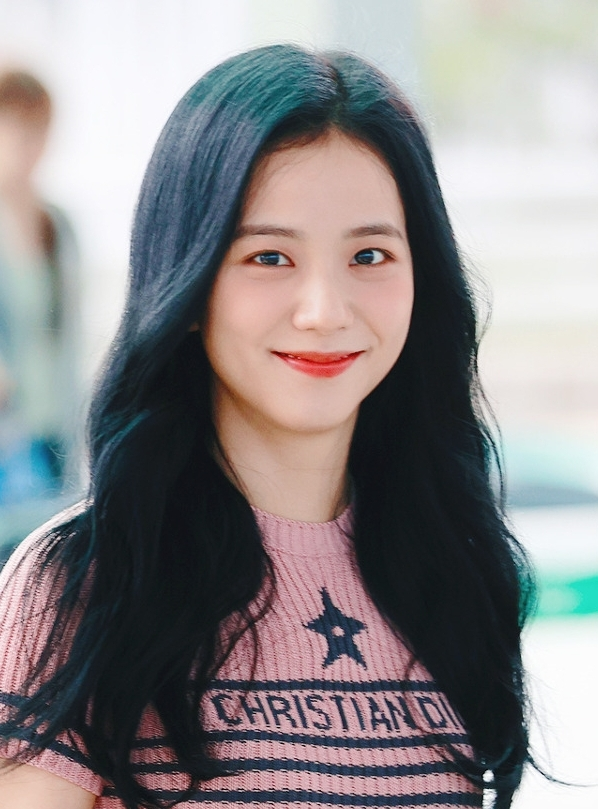
Blackpink's Jisoo (pictured) won her first ever music show and achieved her first triple crown as a soloist with her song "Flower".

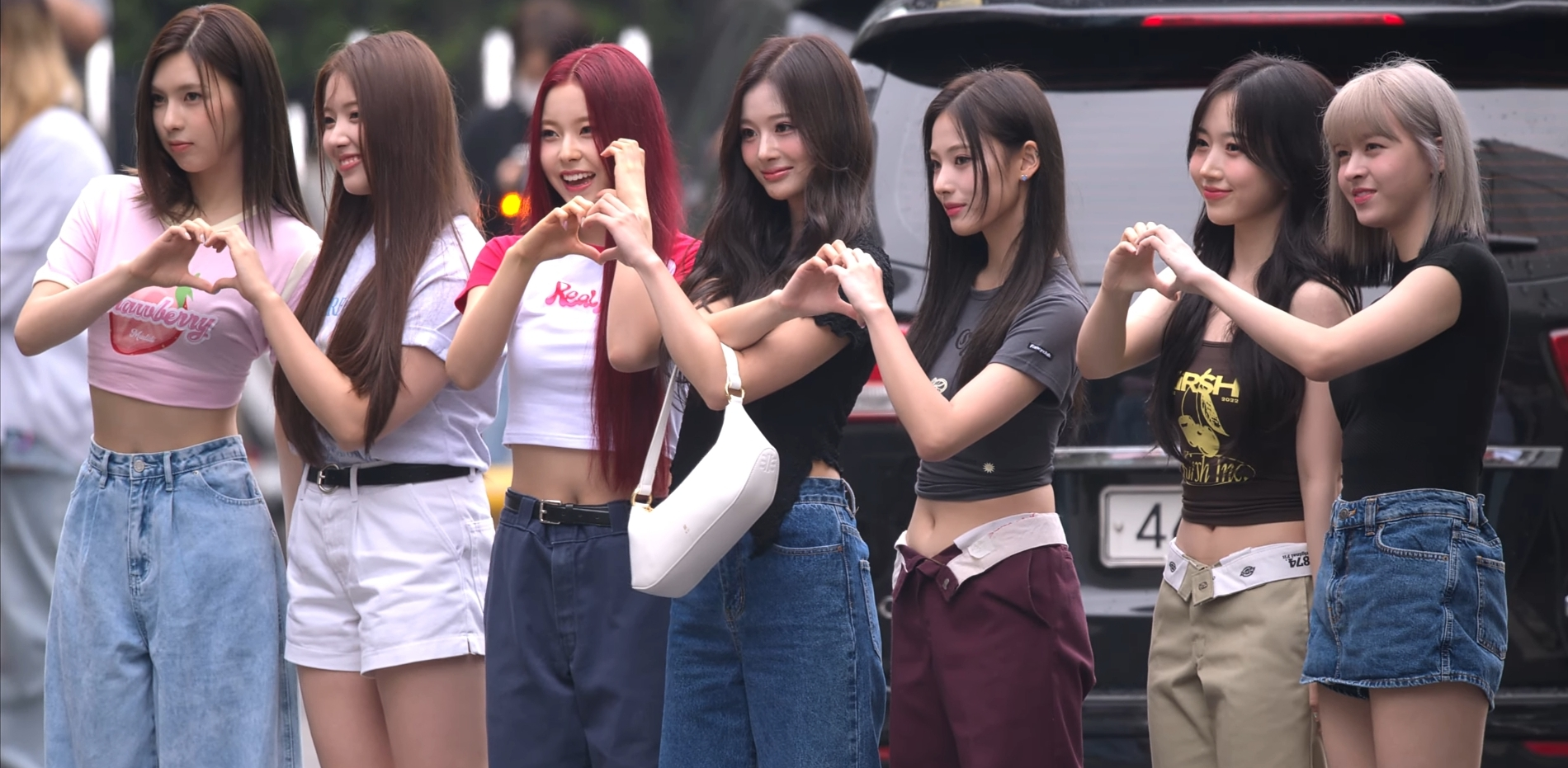
Nmixx (pictured) received their first ever music show win and had the highest score of the year with "Love Me Like This" on Show Champion March 29 episode.

The Show Champion Chart is a record chart on the South Korean MBC M television music program Show Champion. Every week, the show awards the best-performing single on the chart in the country during its live broadcast.

In 2023, 31 singles reached number one on the chart, and 26 acts were awarded first-place trophies. "Love Me Like This" by Nmixx had the highest score of the year, with 9,176 points on the March 29 broadcast. "Flower" by Jisoo is the song to achieve a triple crown.

== Chart history ==
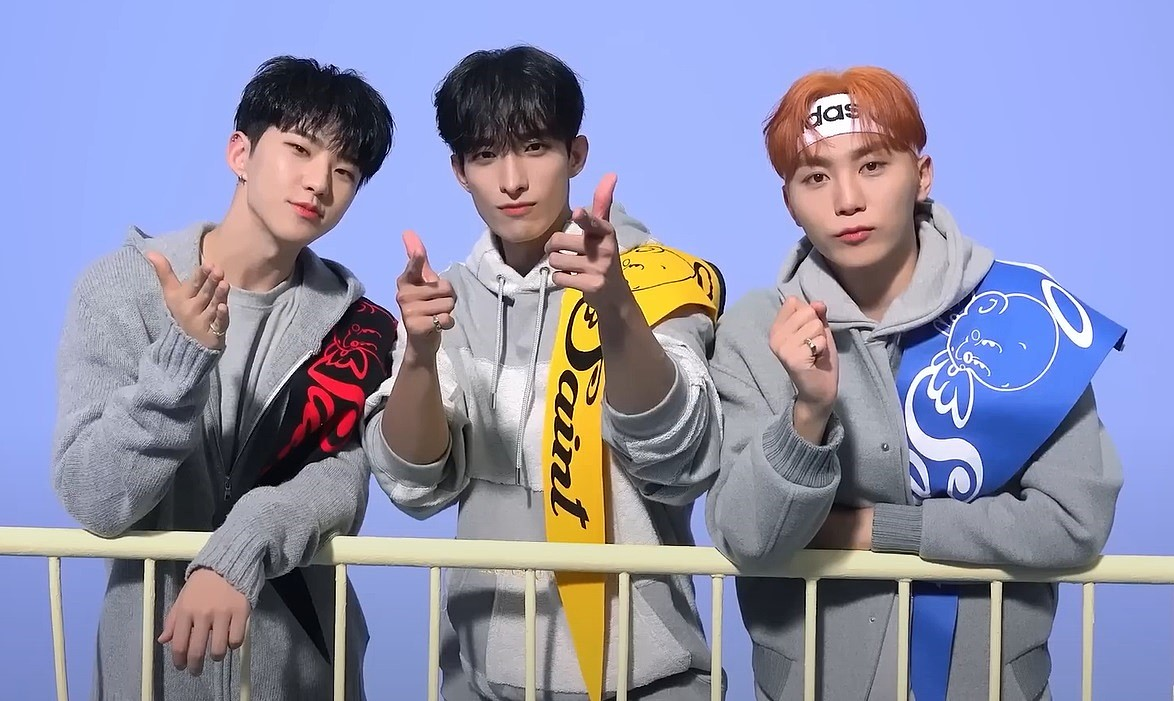
BSS (pictured) won their first ever music show with their Show Champion award for "Fighting."

Key
	Indicates a Triple Crown
	Highest score of the year
—	No show was held

Episode	Date	Artist	Song	Points	Ref.
—	January 4	No Broadcast or Winner			
—	January 11	No Broadcast or Winner			
—	January 18	No Broadcast or Winner			
—	January 25	No Broadcast or Winner			
—	February 1	No Broadcast or Winner			
462	February 8	NCT 127	"Ay-Yo"	4,751	
463	February 15	BSS	"Fighting"	5,963	
464	February 22	STAYC	"Teddy Bear"	6,240	
465	March 1	The Boyz	"Roar"	4,839	
466	March 8	STAYC	"Teddy Bear"	6,083	
467 (Note: Highlight episode.)	March 15	No Winner			
468	March 22	Twice	"Set Me Free"	5,120	
469	March 29	Nmixx	"Love Me Like This"	9,176	
470	April 5	Jisoo	"Flower"	6,990	
471	April 12	Jisoo	"Flower"	7,058	
472	April 19	Ive	"I Am"	6,607	
473	April 26	Jisoo	"Flower"	4,870	
474	May 3	Seventeen	"Super"	5,706	
475	May 10	Le Sserafim	"Unforgiven"	7,521	
—	May 17	No Broadcast or Winner			
476	May 24	(G)I-dle	"Queencard"	8,141	
477	May 31	Dreamcatcher	"Bon Voyage"	4,732	
478	June 7	Stray Kids	"S-Class"	4,790	
479	June 14	Stray Kids	"S-Class"	5,149	
480	June 21	Ateez	"Bouncy (K-Hot Chilli Peppers)"	5,821	
481	June 28	Lim Young-woong	"Grain of Sand"	5,310	
482	July 5	Shinee	"Hard"	7,946	
483	July 12	Shinee	"Hard"	6,578	
484	July 19	Zerobaseone	"In Bloom"	6,425	
485	July 26	NCT Dream	"ISTJ"	5,387	
486	August 2	Jungkook	"Seven"	5,545	
487	August 9	Jungkook	"Seven"	5,311	
488	August 16	NewJeans	"Super Shy"	3,779	
—	August 23	No Broadcast or Winner			
489	August 30	Everglow	"Slay"	4,392	
490	September 6	NCT U	"Baggy Jeans"	4,982	
491	September 13	BoyNextDoor	"But Sometimes"	4,486	
492	September 20	V	"Slow Dancing"	4,599	
493	September 27	Tempest	"Vroom Vroom"	5,317	
494	October 4	No Winner			
495	October 11	NCT 127	"Fact Check"	7,059	
496	October 18	NCT 127	"Fact Check"	5,082	
497	October 25	Ive	"Baddie"	4,958	
498	November 1	Seventeen	"God of Music"	7,061	
499	November 8	NiziU	"Heartris"	4,149	
500	November 15	Stray Kids	"Lalalala"	5,500	
—	November 22	No Broadcast or Winner			
—	November 29	No Broadcast or Winner			
501	December 6	Ateez	"Crazy Form"	5,051	
—	December 13	No Broadcast or Winner			
—	December 20	No Broadcast or Winner			
—	December 27	No Broadcast or Winner			
