= Sullyoon =

South Korean singer (born 2004)

- Sullyoon in 2026
- Born: Seol Yoon-a; January 26, 2004 (age 22); South Korea
- Occupations: Singer; dancer
- Musical career
- Genre: K-pop
- Instrument: Vocals
- Years active: 2022–present
- Label: JYP
- Member of: Nmixx

Korean name
- Hangul: 설윤아
- RR: Seol Yuna
- MR: Sŏl Yuna

Stage name
- Hangul: 설윤
- RR: Seolyun
- MR: Sŏryun

Seol Yoon-a (Korean: 설윤아; born January 26, 2004), better known by her stage name Sullyoon (설윤), is a South Korean singer. She debuted in 2022 as a member of the girl group Nmixx, formed by JYP Entertainment. In addition, to her work with the group, she has participated in individual fashion campaigns and editorial features.

== Early life ==
Sullyoon attended Hanlim Multi Art School and graduated in February 2023.

== Career ==
=== 2021–present: Debut with Nmixx and solo activities ===
On September 3, 2021, Sullyoon was introduced as a member of JYPn (Nmixx's pre-debut name) through a cover performance of "Full Moon" by Sunmi. Sullyoon officially debuted with Nmixx on February 22, 2022, with the single album Ad Mare and its lead track "O.O".

In April 2023, she was appointed as a host of Show! Music Core alongside Lee Know and Jungwoo. She concluded her tenure on February 15, 2025. Ahead of Nmixx's April 2025 comeback, Sullyoon appeared in an individual digital cover and interview for Elle Korea, in which she discussed her preparations for the group's return and reflected on her nearly two-year run as a Show! Music Core host.

In December 2024, Sullyoon performed a cover of Alaina Castillo's "Pocket Locket" with Aespa's Karina and Itzy's Yuna at the 2024 MBC Music Festival. Their performance was well received and helped boost the song's popularity in South Korea. On February 25, 2026, Sullyoon released a duet ballad titled "Always" (지금 이대로만) with Parc Jae-jung. It received a nomination for Best Collaboration at the 2026 MAMA Awards.

In April 2026, Sullyoon threw the ceremonial first pitch at a San Francisco Giants game at Oracle Park in San Francisco, where Nmixx also performed.

== Public appearances ==
In September 2026, Sullyoon attended Sandro's Fall/Winter 2026 collection presentation in Cheongdam-dong, Seoul. She also attended the opening event for MUSINSA Beauty Hongdae in Seoul.

== Public image ==
Several South Korean media outlets have referred to Sullyoon, alongside Jang Won-young and Karina, as part of a visual trio known as "Jang-Ka-Sul" (장카설).

== Endorsements ==
In March 2025, she was selected as a model for Kabrew's highball product line. In June 2026, Sullyoon was featured on the digital cover of Harper's Bazaar Korea for a fashion campaign with the Japanese brand Onitsuka Tiger. The pictorial, titled "In the Wings", featured a ballerina-inspired concept and styling with Onitsuka Tiger footwear. In August 2026, Sullyoon was selected as the image model for the Japanese contact lens brand Aturia, and was named a brand ambassador for French skincare brand Bioderma. In October 2026, she was named the global brand ambassador for South Korean contemporary fashion brand Dunst.

== Discography ==
=== Singles ===
==== Collaborations ====
Title	Year	Peak chart positions	Album
Title	Year	KOR	Album
"Always" (지금 이대로만) (with Parc Jae-jung)	2026	147	Non-album single

=== Soundtrack appearances ===
List of soundtrack appearances, showing year released, selected chart positions, and name of the album
Title	Year	Peak chart positions	Album
Title	Year	KOR	Album
"The Moment" (너를 만난 순간) (with Lily)	2023	— (Note: "The Moment" did not enter the Circle Digital Chart, but peaked at number 170 on the Download Chart.)	Love to Hate You OST
"—" denotes releases that did not chart or were not released in that region.

=== Songwriting credits ===
Year	Artist	Song	Album	Note	Ref
2026	Herself and Bae	"Hot 'n Unbothered"	Strange Muse	As a lyricist	

== Filmography ==
=== Television shows ===
Year	Title	Role	Notes	Ref.
2023–2025	Show! Music Core	Host	With Lee Know and Jungwoo	

== Performances ==
=== Festivals ===
Date	Event	City	Country	Notes	Ref.
December 31, 2024	2024 MBC Music Festival	Daejeon	South Korea	with Karina and Yuna	

== Awards and nominations ==
Name of the award ceremony, year presented, category, nominee of the award, and the result of the nomination
Award ceremony	Year	Category	Nominee / Work	Result	Ref.
MAMA Awards	2026	Best Collaboration	"Always" (with Parc Jae-jung)	Nominated	
