= Birthday Wish (song) =

Single by Nmixx

from the EP Strange Muse
- Language: Korean
- Released: October 19, 2026
- Genre: Pop
- Length: 3:20
- Label: JYP; Republic
- Composers: 2Summery; Kristine Bogan; Ido Nadjar
- Lyricists: Yu Ga-young (Artiffect); Seo-rin (Artiffect); Song Hee-yoon (Onclassa); Since; Jeon Ye-jin (Jamfactory); Kim Sang-eun (Jamfactory); Jeon Se-hui (Inhouse); Kristine Bogan

Nmixx singles chronology
"Heavy Serenade" (2026)	"Birthday Wish" (2026)

Music video
- "Birthday Wish" on YouTube

"Birthday Wish" (Korean: 긴 소원; RR: Gin sowon; lit. 'A long wish') is a song recorded by South Korean girl group Nmixx for their sixth extended play Strange Muse. It was released as the EP's lead single by JYP Entertainment and Republic Records on October 19, 2026.

== Background and release ==
On September 21, 2026, JYP Entertainment announced that Nmixx would be releasing the song titled "Birthday Wish" on October 19, as the lead single for their sixth extended play Strange Muse. Previews of the song were released through the a cappella and original highlight medley videos on October 11 and 15 respectively. On October 18, the teaser for the song's music video was released. The song was released alongside its music video upon the release of the extended play on October 19.

== Composition ==
"Birthday Wish" was written by Yu Ga-young (Artiffect), Seo-rin (Artiffect), Song Hee-yoon (Onclassa), Since, Jeon Ye-jin (Jamfactory), Kim Sang-eun (Jamfactory), Jeon Se-hui (Inhouse) and Kristine Bogan, and composed and arranged by 2Summery, with Kristine Bogan and Ido Nadjar participating in the composition. It is a pop song blending elements of moombahton, afro, and future house.

== Promotion ==
Nmixx performed "Birthday Wish" on four music programs in the first week of promotion: Mnet's M Countdown on October 22, KBS's Music Bank on October 23, MBC's Show! Music Core on October 24, and SBS's Inkigayo on October 25.

== Credits and personnel ==
Credits adapted from Melon.

Studio

- JYPE Studios – recording, vocal editing
- Seltzer Sounds – mixing
- Klang Studio – mixing for Dolby Atmos
- 821 Sound Mastering – mastering

Personnel

- Nmixx – vocals
  - Lily – background vocals
- Yu Ga-young (Artiffect) – lyrics
- Seo-rin (Artiffect) – lyrics
- Song Hee-yoon (Onclassa) – lyrics
- Since – lyrics
- Jeon Ye-jin (Jamfactory) – lyrics
- Kim Sang-eun (Jamfactory) – lyrics
- Jeon Se-hui (Inhouse) – lyrics
- Kristine Bogan – lyrics, composition
- 2Summery – composition, arrangement, instrumentals, synthesizer, keyboard, vocal directing
- Ido Nadjar – composition
- Mingu Kim (Nine) – vocal directing
- Seo Eun-il – vocal editing, recording
- Austin Seltzer – mixing
- Gu Jong-pil – mixing
- P.O.D – mixing (assistant)
- Kwon Nam-woo – mastering

== Charts ==
=== Weekly charts ===
Weekly chart performance for "Birthday Wish"
Chart (2026)	Peak position
South Korea (Circle)	24
Taiwan (Billboard)	8

=== Monthly charts ===
Monthly chart performance for "Birthday Wish"
Chart (2026)	Peak position
South Korea (Circle)	110

== Accolades ==
Music program awards for "Birthday Wish"
Program	Date	Ref.
Music Bank	October 30, 2026	

== Release history ==
Release history for "Birthday Wish"
Region	Date	Format	Label
Various	October 19, 2026	Digital download; streaming	JYP; Republic
