= Heavy Serenade (song) =

Single by Nmixx

from the EP Heavy Serenade
- Language: Korean
- Released: May 11, 2026
- Genre: Electronic rock; electropop
- Length: 3:00
- Label: JYP; Republic
- Composers: Esum; Ayushy (The Hub); Awrii (The Hub); Maribelle Anes; Josefin Glenmark; Seora; SSo
- Lyricist: Hanroro

Nmixx singles chronology
| "Tic Tic" (2026) | "Heavy Serenade" (2026) | "Birthday Wish" (2026) |

Music video
- "Heavy Serenade" on YouTube

"Heavy Serenade" is a song recorded by South Korean girl group Nmixx for their fifth extended play of the same name. It was released as the EP's lead single by JYP Entertainment and Republic Records on May 11, 2026. It has been described as an electronic rock and electropop song with trance, acid and drum and bass elements.

== Background and release ==
On April 14, 2026, JYP Entertainment announced that Nmixx would be releasing the song titled "Heavy Serenade" on May 11, as the lead single for their fifth extended play of the same name. The extended play's track listing was released on April 21, revealing "Heavy Serenade" as the second track and that its lyrics were written by South Korean singer-songwriter Hanroro. Previews of the song were released through the a cappella and original highlight medley videos on May 3 and 7 respectively. The teaser for the song's music video was released on May 10. "Heavy Serenade" was released on May 11 as part of the extended play, alongside its music video.

== Composition ==
"Heavy Serenade" was written by Hanroro, and composed and arranged by Esum, with Ayushy (The Hub), Awrii (The Hub), Maribelle Anes, Josefin Glenmark, Seora and SSo participating in the composition. It is an electronic rock and electropop song that incorporates elements of trance, acid and drum and bass.

== Promotion ==
Nmixx performed "Heavy Serenade" on four music programs in the first week of promotion: Mnet's M Countdown on May 14, KBS's Music Bank on May 15, MBC's Show! Music Core on May 16, and SBS's Inkigayo on May 17.

== Credits and personnel ==
Credits adapted from Melon.

Studio

- JYPE Studios – recording, mixing
- Klang Studio – mixing for Dolby Atmos
- 821 Sound Mastering – mastering

Personnel

- Nmixx – vocals
  - Lily – background vocals
  - Kyujin – background vocals
- Hanroro – lyrics
- Esum – composition, arrangement, computer programming, synthesizer, keyboard, vocal directing
- Ayushy (The Hub) – composition
- Awrii (The Hub) – composition
- Maribelle Anes – composition
- Josefin Glenmark – composition
- Seora – composition
- Sso – composition
- Jung Kyung-soo – electric guitar
- C'SA – vocal directing, vocal editing
- Seo Eun-il – recording
- Gu Hye-jin – recording
- Lee Tae-seob – mixing
- Gu Jong-pil – mixing
- P.O.D – mixing (assistant)
- Kwon Nam-woo – mastering

== Charts ==
=== Weekly charts ===
Weekly chart performance for "Heavy Serenade"
| Chart (2026) | Peak position |
|---|---|
| Global Excl. US (Billboard) | 138 |
| Hong Kong (Billboard) | 14 |
| Singapore Regional (RIAS) | 18 |
| South Korea (Circle) | 8 |
| Taiwan (Billboard) | 1 |

=== Monthly charts ===
Monthly chart performance for "Heavy Serenade"
| Chart (2026) | Position |
|---|---|
| South Korea (Circle) | 12 |

== Accolades ==
Music program awards for "Heavy Serenade"
| Program | Date | Ref. |
|---|---|---|
| M Countdown | May 21, 2026 | |
| Music Bank | May 22, 2026 | |

== Release history ==
Release history for "Heavy Serenade"
| Region | Date | Format | Label |
|---|---|---|---|
| Various | May 11, 2026 | Digital download; streaming | JYP; Republic |
