= Blue Valentine (Nmixx album) =

- Digital cover

Studio album by Nmixx
- Released: October 13, 2025
- Length: 34:00
- Languages: Korean; English; Spanish
- Labels: JYP; Republic

Nmixx chronology
Fe3O4: Forward (2025)	Blue Valentine (2025)	Heavy Serenade (2026)

Singles from Blue Valentine
- 1. "Blue Valentine" Released: October 13, 2025

Professional ratings
Review scores
Source	Rating
IZM	4/5 stars
AllMusic	4/5 stars

Blue Valentine is the debut studio album by South Korean girl group Nmixx. It was released by JYP Entertainment and Republic Records on October 13, 2025, and contains twelve tracks, including the lead single of the same name.

== Background and release ==
On September 15, 2025, upon the release of a motion poster, JYP Entertainment announced that Nmixx would be releasing their first studio album titled Blue Valentine on October 13. The promotion schedule was released the following day. On September 24, the album tracklist was revealed, confirming the lead single of the same name. It was also confirmed that two split parts of the group's debut single "O.O", subtitled "Baila" and "Superhero", would be included in the album. The album trailer video titled The Paradox of Love was released on September 26. "Valentine", "Blue" and "Chaos" versions of concept photos were released from September 27 to 29.

The teaser and video for the album's second track "Spinnin' on It" were released on October 3 and 4 respectively. On October 8 and 10, the a cappella and original highlight medley videos of the album's tracks were released respectively. The music video teaser for the lead single was released on October 12. The album was released on October 13, alongside the music video for the lead single.

== Promotion ==
On October 13, 2025, prior to the release of Blue Valentine, Nmixx held a countdown live event on YouTube to celebrate the release of the studio album and connect with their fanbase. A pop up store was also hosted from October 15 to 26 at the IFC Mall in Seoul to commemorate the album's release.

== Accolades ==
=== Year-end lists ===
Year-end lists
Publication	List	Rank	Ref.
Billboard	The 25 Best K-Pop Albums of 2025: Staff Picks	2	
Forbes	Most Acclaimed K-Pop Group Album of 2025	1	
Idology	Top 20 Albums of 2025	Placed	
IZM	The Best Korean Albums of 2025	Placed	
NME	The 50 Best Albums of 2025	49	
Teen Vogue	15 Best Non-English Albums of 2025	Placed	

== Track listing ==
Track listing for Blue Valentine
No.	Title	Lyrics	Music	Arrangement	Length
1.	"Blue Valentine"	J14 (Full8loom); Youra (Full8loom); Danke (Lalala Studio); Kook Ji-won (Jam Factory); Moon Seol-ri; Jellybean (153/Joombas); Milena; Seora	Kass; Sevn Dayz; Stalking Gia	Kass; Lee Hae-sol	3:06
2.	"Spinnin' on It"	3! (Lalala Studio); Since; Kang Eun-jeong; Oh Hyun-sun (Lalala Studio); Shin Sa-gang (XYXX); Error404; Lee Hyeong-ju (Lalala Studio)	Lee Woo-min "Collapsedone"; C'SA; Fredrik "Fredro" Odesjo; Julie Yu; Anders Gukko; Rebbi James; Sandra Wikström	Collapsedone; Fredro	3:16
3.	"Phoenix"	Ha Yoon-a (153/Joombas); Danke	C'SA; Ends	Ends	2:44
4.	"Reality Hurts"	Lily; Sophie Powers; Lauren Dyson; David Wilson	Lauren Dyson; Sophie Powers; Matthew Ferree; David Wilson	Dwilly; Mattisnotfamous	2:35
5.	"Rico"	Jonjon (XYXX); Jeon Se-hui (Inhouse); Lee Green (Lalala Studio); Jeong Na-kyeong (153/Joombas); Chari (153/Joombas); Park Sang-yu (153/Joombas)	Esum; Kristine Bogan; Charlie McClean; Ido Nadjar	Esum	2:32
6.	"Game Face"	Jo In-ho (Lalala Studio); Sung Yu-jin (Jam Factory); Moon Ji-young (Lalala Studio)	Amanda Cy; Rebbi James; Teodor Dahlbom	Teo	2:43
7.	"Podium"	Haewon; Lee Seu-ran; Im Su-ran (Lalala Studio)	Ryan S. Jhun; Marc Sibley; Nathan Cunningham; Lauren Amber Aquilina; Marcus Andersson	Ryan S. Jhun; Space Primates	3:01
8.	"Crush on You"	Since; Haewon	Mack; Jonathan B-T; Gustav Blomberg	Gustav Blomberg	2:39
9.	"Adore U"	Hyeong-geun (PNP); Choi Bo-ra (153/Joombas)	Morwell; Julie Yu; Kamilla Bayrak	Morwell	2:30
10.	"Shape of Love"	Rory (Jam Factory); Jo In-ho (Lalala Studio); Moon Seol-ri	Rodnae "Chikk" Bell; Johan Gustafsson; Rebbi James	Johan Gustafsson	2:52
11.	"O.O Part 1 (Baila)"	Dr. Jo	Brian U (The Hub); Enan; Chanti (The Hub); Charlotte Wilson; Awrii (The Hub); Ayushy (The Hub); Rajan Muse; Jan Baars	Brian U (The Hub); Enan	3:06
12.	"O.O Part 2 (Superhero)"	Dr. Jo	Brian U (The Hub); MarkAlong; Ejae; Charlotte Wilson	Brian U (The Hub); MarkAlong	2:56
Total length:					34:00

== Credits and personnel ==
Credits adapted from album's liner notes.

Studio

- JYPE Studio – vocal editing (track 4–6, 9, 11–12), recording (all tracks), mixing (track 1, 6, 11–12)
- Ingrid Studio – vocal editing (track 8)
- Alawn Music Studios – mixing (track 2, 5, 7)
- Stay Tuned Studio – mixing (track 3, 8)
- Snackworld – mixing (track 4), mastering (track 4)
- Klang Studio – mixing (track 9–10)
- Glab Studio – mixing for Dolby Atmos (all tracks)
- 821 Sound Mastering – mastering (all tracks)

Personnel

- Nmixx – vocals (all tracks), background vocals (track 1–10)
  - Lily – background vocals (track 1–4, 6, 9–10), lyrics (track 4)
  - Haewon – background vocals (track 1, 9), lyrics (track 7–8)
  - Jiwoo – background vocals (track 1)
  - Kyujin – background vocals (track 1, 3, 6, 9–10)
- J14 (Full8loom) – lyrics (track 1)
- Youra (Full8loom) – lyrics (track 1)
- Danke (Lalala Studio) – lyrics (track 1, 3)
- Kook Ji-won (Jam Factory) – lyrics (track 1)
- Moon Seol-ri – lyrics (track 1, 10)
- Jellybean (153/Joombas) – lyrics (track 1)
- Milena – lyrics (track 1)
- Seora – lyrics (track 1)
- 3! (Lalala Studio) – lyrics (track 2)
- Since – lyrics (track 2, 8)
- Kang Eun-jeong – lyrics (track 2)
- Oh Hyun-sun (Lalala Studio) – lyrics (track 2)
- Shin Sa-gang (XYXX) – lyrics (track 2)
- Error404 – lyrics (track 2)
- Lee Hyeong-ju (Lalala Studio) – lyrics (track 2)
- Ha Yoon-a (153/Joombas) – lyrics (track 3)
- Sophie Powers – lyrics, composition, background vocals (track 4)
- Lauren Dyson – lyrics, composition (track 4)
- David Wilson a.k.a. Dwilly – lyrics, composition, arrangement, drums, keys, bass, guitar, programming (track 4)
- Jonjon (XYXX) – lyrics (track 5)
- Jeon Se-hui (Inhouse) – lyrics (track 5)
- Lee Green (Lalala Studio) – lyrics (track 5)
- Jeong Na-kyeong (153/Joombas) – lyrics (track 5)
- Chari (153/Joombas) – lyrics (track 5)
- Park Sang-yu (153/Joombas) – lyrics (track 5)
- Jo In-ho (Lalala Studio) – lyrics (track 6, 10)
- Song Yu-jin (Jam Factory) – lyrics (track 6)
- Moon Ji-young (Lalala Studio) – lyrics (track 6)
- Lee Seu-ran – lyrics (track 7)
- Im Su-ran – lyrics (track 7)
- Hyeong-geun (PNP) – lyrics (track 9)
- Choi Bo-ra (153/Joombas) – lyrics (track 9)
- Rory (Jam Factory) – lyrics (track 10)
- Dr. JO – lyrics (track 11–12)
- Kass – composition, arrangement, computer programming, piano, electric guitar, synths, bass (track 1)
- Sevn Dayz – composition (track 1)
- Stalking Gia – composition (track 1)
- Lee Hae-sol – arrangement (track 1)
- Lee Woo-min "collapsedone" – composition, arrangement, computer programming, bass, electric guitar, synths, piano, vocal directing, vocal editing (track 2)
- C'SA – composition (track 2–3), background vocals (track 2–3, 8, 10), vocal directing (track 1–3, 7, 10), vocal editing (track 1–3, 7, 10)
- Fredrik "Fredro" Odesjo – composition, arrangement (track 2)
- Julie Yu – composition (track 2, 9)
- Anders Gukko – composition (track 2)
- Rebbi James – composition (track 2, 6, 10), background vocals (track 10)
- Sandra Wikström – composition (track 2)
- Ends – composition, arrangement, synth, drums, bass, vocal directing (track 3)
- Matthew Ferree a.k.a. Mattisnotfamous – composition, arrangement, drums, keys, bass, guitar, programming (track 4)
- Esum – composition, arrangement, computer programming, piano, electric guitar, synths, bass, vocal directing (track 5)
- Kristine Bogan – composition (track 5)
- Charlie McClean – composition (track 5)
- Ido Nadjar – composition (track 5)
- Amanda Cy – composition (track 6)
- Teodor Dahlbom a.k.a. Teo – composition, arrangement, programming, synths, vocal FX (track 6)
- Ryan S. Jhun – composition, arrangement (track 7)
- Marc Sibley (Space Primates) – composition, arrangement, programming, guitars, keys, bass (track 7)
- Nathan Cunningham (Space Primates) – composition, arrangement, programming, guitars, keys, bass (track 7)
- Lauren Amber Aquilina – composition (track 7)
- Marcus Andersson – composition (track 7)
- Mack – composition (track 8)
- Jonathan B-T – composition (track 8)
- Gustav Blomberg – composition, arrangement, all instruments, electric guitar (track 8)
- Morwell – composition, arrangement, computer programming, bass guitar, synths, electric guitar (track 9)
- Kamilla Bayrak – composition (track 9)
- Rodnae "Chikk" Bell – composition, background vocals (track 10)
- Johan Gustafsson – composition, arrangement, computer programming, guitars, synths (track 10)
- Brian U (The Hub) – composition, arrangement, drums, synths, vocal directing (track 11–12), computer programming (track 12)
- Enan – composition, arrangement, drums, synths, vocal directing (track 11)
- Chanti (The Hub) – composition (track 11)
- Charlotte Wilson – composition, vocal directing (track 11–12)
- Awrii (The Hub) – composition, background vocals (track 11), vocal directing (track 5)
- Ayushy (The Hub) – composition, background vocals (track 11)
- Rajan Muse – composition (track 11)
- Jan Baars – composition (track 11)
- Frankie Day (The Hub) – background vocals (track 11)
- MarkAlong – composition, arrangement, computer programming, drums, synths (track 12)
- Ejae – composition, background vocals (track 12), vocal directing (track 11–12)
- Markus Sepehrmanesh – electric guitar (track 8)
- Jade – bass (track 12)
- BananaGaraG – bass (track 12)
- Paper Planet – guitar (track 12)
- Triad – guitar (track 12)
- Sophia Pae – vocal directing (track 4)
- Kriz – vocal directing (track 5, 8)
- Perrie – vocal directing (track 6)
- Song Hee-jin – vocal directing (track 6, 9)
- Kim Gab-soo – vocal editing (track 4, 9), recording (track 1)
- Eom Se-hee – vocal editing (track 5, 11–12), recording (track 1–2, 12), mixing (track 11–12)
- Lim Chan-mi – vocal editing (track 6), recording (track 6, 8–9)
- Jung Eun-kyung – vocal editing (track 8)
- Lee Sang-yeop – vocal editing (track 11–12)
- Jiyoung Shin NYC – vocal editing (track 11–12)
- Lee Chang-hoon – recording (track 1–2, 5–7, 9–12)
- Gu Hye-jin – recording (track 3, 9, 11)
- Seo Eun-il – recording (track 4–6, 8, 10)
- Choi Hye-jin – recording (track 6)
- Lee Tae-seob – mixing (track 1)
- Alawn – mixing (track 2, 5, 7)
- Stay Tuned – mixing (track 3, 8)
- Tom Norris – mixing, mastering (track 4)
- Im Hong-jin – mixing (track 6)
- Gu Jong-pil – mixing (track 9–10)
- Eom Se-hyeon – engineering for mix (track 9–10)
- Jaycen Joshua – original mixing (track 11)
- Jacob Richards – original mixing assistance (track 11)
- Mike Seaberg – original mixing assistance (track 11)
- DJ Riggins – original mixing assistance (track 11)
- Shin Bong-won – mixing in Dolby Atmos (all tracks)
- Park Nam-jun - mixing assistance in Dolby Atmos (all tracks)
- Victor Verpillat - mastering (track 4)
- Kwon Nam-woo – mastering (track 1–3, 5–12)

== Charts ==
=== Weekly charts ===
Weekly chart performance for Blue Valentine
Chart (2025)	Peak position
Croatian International Albums (HDU)	34
Greek Albums (IFPI)	37
Japanese Albums (Oricon)	31
Japanese Combined Albums (Oricon)	37
Japanese Hot Albums (Billboard Japan)	40
Scottish Albums (Official Charts)	78
South Korean Albums (Circle)	2
US Billboard 200	177
US World Albums (Billboard)	2

=== Monthly charts ===
Monthly chart performance for Blue Valentine
Chart (2025)	Position
South Korean Albums (Circle)	6

=== Year-end charts ===
Year-end chart performance for Blue Valentine
Chart (2025)	Position
South Korean Albums (Circle)	42

== Certifications ==
Certifications for Blue Valentine
Region	Certification	Certified units/sales
South Korea (KMCA)	2× Platinum	500,000^{^}
^{^} Shipments figures based on certification alone.

== Release history ==
Release history for Blue Valentine
Region	Date	Format	Label
South Korea	October 13, 2025	CD; LP	JYP; Republic
Various	October 13, 2025	Digital download; streaming	JYP; Republic
