= Crescendo (song) =

Song by Nmixx

from the album Heavy Serenade
- Language: Korean
- Released: May 11, 2026
- Genre: K-pop; alternative pop
- Length: 2:39
- Label: JYP; Republic
- Composers: 2Summery; Kristine Bogan; Ido Nadjar
- Lyricists: Lily; Kim Min-jeong (Lalala Studio); Hyeon Ji-won; Baek So-hyeon (Inhouse); Kim Se-jin (Artiffect); Mehere (Artiffect)

Music video
- "Crescendo" on YouTube

"Crescendo" is a song recorded by South Korean girl group Nmixx for their fifth extended play Heavy Serenade. It was released as part of the EP by JYP Entertainment and Republic Records on May 11, 2026. A music video for the song was pre-released on April 28, 2026. Its lyrics draw a parallel between the rising feeling at the start of a relationship and a musical crescendo.

== Background and release ==
On April 14, 2026, JYP Entertainment announced that Nmixx would release their fifth extended play Heavy Serenade on May 11, with a song titled "Crescendo" to be pre-released on April 28. The track listing for the EP was released on April 22, with "Crescendo" revealed as the first track, and Nmixx member Lily confirmed to have participated as a lyricist for the song. The music video teaser for "Crescendo" was released on April 27. The music video for the song was released on April 28, and the song was released digitally alongside Heavy Serenade on May 11.

== Composition ==
"Crescendo" was written by Lily, Kim Min-jeong (Lalala Studio), Hyeon Ji-won, Baek So-hyeon (Inhouse), Kim Se-jin (Artiffect) and Mehere (Artiffect), and composed and arranged by 2Summery, with Kristine Bogan and Ido Nadjar participating in the composition. Beginning with a "delicate music box" in the intro, the song creates a "dramatic atmosphere" through the contrast of "soft melodies and intensely penetrating synths and drums." Its lyrics draw a comparison between the growing feelings of a relationship and a musical crescendo, where a song gets increasingly louder. This is also reflected in the music and structure, where the members build vocal harmonies throughout the chorus, and with the music box sound from the intro reappearing in the outro.

== Music video ==
The music video for "Crescendo", directed by Jeongyeon Lee, was released on April 28, 2026. It features Nmixx in a post-apocalyptic and "breathing life into the silence", embodying the group's "Mixxtopia" world. In a monochrome space upside down to a foggy field, Sullyoon breathes life into her hand and places it on the ground, and the members hammer something attached to Kyujin's hair, causing the earth to spark, and share in the warmth as it illuminates the darkness. At the end, the members pull a rope together and start comfortably rising one-by-one, finishing with the same shot of Sullyoon from a different angle.

== Critical reception ==
Billboard named "Crescendo" the fifth best K-pop song of 2026 in its mid-year rankings, praising the song's dynamic arrangement and vocal performance as "technical, physical and unexpectedly romantic".

== Credits and personnel ==
All credits adapted from Melon.

Studio

- JYPE Studios – recording, mixing
- Klang Studio – mixing for Dolby Atmos
- 821 Sound Mastering – mastering

Personnel

- Nmixx – vocals
  - Lily – lyrics, background vocals
  - Haewon – background vocals
- 2Summery – composition, arrangement, computer programming, all instruments, synthesizer, keyboards, vocal direction
- Kim Min-jeong (Lalala Studio) – lyrics
- Hyeon Ji-won – lyrics
- Baek So-hyun (Inhouse) – lyrics
- Kim Se-jin (Artiffect) – lyrics
- Mehere (Artiffect) – lyrics
- Kristine Bogan – composition
- Ido Nadjar – composition
- C'SA – vocal direction, vocal editing
- Ken Lewis – mixing
- Jonathan Garcia – mixing assistance
- Kwon Nam-woo – mastering
- Gu Hye-jin – recording
- Gu Jong-pil – Dolby Atmos mixing
- P.O.D. – Dolby Atmos mixing assistance

== Charts ==
Chart performance for "Crescendo"
Chart (2026)	Peak position
South Korea (Circle)	154

== Release history ==
Release history for "Crescendo"
Region	Date	Format	Label
Various	May 11, 2026	Digital download; streaming	JYP; Republic
