= Funky Glitter Christmas =

- Digital cover

Single by Nmixx
- Language: Korean
- Released: November 23, 2022
- Length: 3:10
- Label: JYP
- Composers: Alysa; JJean; Justin Reinstein
- Lyricists: Cho Yuri; Hwang Yubin; JJean

Nmixx singles chronology
"Dice" (2022)	"Funky Glitter Christmas" (2022)	"Young, Dumb, Stupid" (2023)

Music video
- "Funky Glitter Christmas" on YouTube

"Funky Glitter Christmas" is a song recorded by South Korean girl group Nmixx. Entitled their first "Intermixxion" single, it was released by JYP Entertainment on November 23, 2022. The song is the last to include member Jinni before her departure from the group on December 9, 2022.

== Background and release ==
On November 12, 2022, JYP Entertainment teased Nmixx's first holiday single with individual and group concept photos. On November 20, the music video teaser for "Funky Glitter Christmas" was released on JYP Entertainment's YouTube channel.

== Composition ==
"Funky Glitter Christmas" was written by Cho Yuri, Hwang Yubin, JJean and composed by Alysa, JJean and Justin Reinstein. The song is described as having various compositions such as musical narration and a jazz-style pre-chorus based on the solid vocal style of the seven members. The song is composed in the key A-major and has 114 beats per minute and a running time of 3 minutes and 10 seconds.

== Promotion ==
On December 29, Nmixx held their first and only comeback stage for the song on Mnet's M Countdown, as the only live performance of the song's music show promotion.

== Credits and personnel ==
Credits adapted from Melon.

Studios

- JYPE Studios – recording
- 821 Sound Mastering – mastering

Personnel

- Nmixx – vocals, background vocals
- Hwang Yubin (VeryGooods) – lyrics
- Jo Yu-ri – lyrics
- JJean – lyrics, composer
- Justin Reinstein – composer
- Alysa – composer, arranger
- Song Hee-jin (Solsire) – vocal director
- Kevin Oppa (Solsire) – vocal director
- Um Se-hee – vocal editing
- Kou Hye-jinat – vocal editing, recording
- Um Se-hee – recording
- Lee Tae-seop – mixing
- Kwon Nam-woo – mastering

== Charts ==
=== Weekly charts ===
Weekly chart performance for "Funky Glitter Christmas"
Chart (2022)	Peak positions
South Korea Download (Circle)	33

=== Monthly charts ===
Monthly chart performance for "Funky Glitter Christmas"
Chart (2022)	Peak position
South Korea Download (Circle)	144

== Release history ==
Release history for "Funky Glitter Christmas"
Region	Date	Format	Label
Various	November 23, 2022	Digital download; streaming	JYP
