= Blue Valentine (song) =

- Mixx version cover

Single by Nmixx

from the album Blue Valentine
- Language: Korean
- Released: October 13, 2025
- Genre: Pop rock
- Length: 3:06
- Label: JYP; Republic
- Composers: Kass; Sevn Dayz; Stalking Gia
- Lyricists: J14 (Full8loom); Youra (Full8loom); Danke; Kook Ji-won (Jamfactory); Moon Seol-li; Jellybean (153/Joombas); Milena; Seora

Nmixx singles chronology
"Know About Me" (2025)	"Blue Valentine" (2025)	"Tic Tic" (2026)

Music video
- "Blue Valentine" on YouTube

Professional ratings
Review scores
Source	Rating
IZM	3.5/5 stars

"Blue Valentine" is a song recorded by South Korean girl group Nmixx for their debut studio album of the same name. It was released as the album's lead single by JYP Entertainment and Republic Records on October 13, 2025. The song garnered ten wins on South Korean music programs and topped the Circle Digital Chart. A Mixx version of the single, containing English and a cappella versions, was released on October 17.

== Background and release ==
On September 15, 2025, it was announced that Nmixx would be releasing their first studio album titled Blue Valentine on October 13. On September 24, upon the reveal of the album tracklist, "Blue Valentine" was confirmed to be the album's lead single. Previews of the song were released through the a cappella and original highlight medley videos on October 8 and 10 respectively. On October 12, the music video teaser for the song was released . The song was released alongside its music video on October 13, upon the release of the studio album. The Mixx version was released on October 17, which includes the English and a cappella versions of the song.

== Composition ==
"Blue Valentine" was written by J14 (Full8loom), Youra (Full8loom), Danke, Kook Ji-won (Jamfactory), Moon Seol-li, Jellybean (153/Joombas), Milena, and Seora, and composed by Kass, Sevn Dayz, and Stalking Gia. The song is described as "a blend of melancholy synth sounds, guitar riffs and boom bap rhythms at different speeds", showcasing the group's signature, trendy take on the "Mixxpop" genre that fuses more than two musical styles into a single track. It has also been described as a pop rock song.

== Promotion ==
Nmixx performed "Blue Valentine" on four music programs in the first week of promotion: Mnet's M Countdown on October 16, KBS's Music Bank on October 17, MBC's Show! Music Core on October 18, and SBS's Inkigayo on October 19. In the second week of promotion, they performed on five music programs: MBC M's Show Champion on October 22, M Countdown on October 23, Music Bank on October 24, Show! Music Core on October 25, and Inkigayo on October 26, where they won first place in all appearances.

== Track listing ==
- Digital download and streaming – Mixx Version
1. "Blue Valentine" – 3:06
2. "Blue Valentine" (English version) – 3:06
3. "Blue Valentine" (A capella version) – 3:06
4. "Blue Valentine" (Sped up version) – 2:30
5. "Blue Valentine" (Instrumental) – 3:06

== Credits and personnel ==
Credits adapted from Melon.

Studio

- JYPE Studios – recording, mixing
- Glab Studios – mixing for Dolby Atmos
- 821 Sound Mastering – mastering

Personnel

- Nmixx – vocals
  - Lily – background vocals; lyrics (English version)
  - Haewon – background vocals
  - Jiwoo – background vocals
  - Kyujin – background vocals
- J14 (Full8loom) – lyrics
- Youra (Full8loom) – lyrics
- Danke – lyrics
- Kook Ji-won (Jamfactory) – lyrics
- Moon Seol-li – lyrics
- Jellybean (153/Joombas) – lyrics
- Milena – lyrics
- Seora – lyrics
- Sophia Pae – lyrics (English version)
- Kass – composition, arrangement, computer programming, various instruments
- Sevn Dayz – composition
- Stalking Gia – composition
- Lee Hae‑sol - arrangement, computer programming, electric guitar
- C'SA – vocal directing, vocal editing
- Lee Chang‑hoon – recording
- Kim Gap‑soo – recording
- Uhm Se-hee – recording
- Lee Tae‑seob – mixing
- Shin Bong-won – mixing
- Park Nam-joon – mixing (assistant)
- Kwon Nam-woo – mastering

== Charts ==
=== Weekly charts ===
Weekly chart performance for "Blue Valentine"
Chart (2025–2026)	Peak position
Global 200 (Billboard)	59
Hong Kong (Billboard)	16
New Zealand Hot Singles (RMNZ)	40
Singapore Regional (RIAS)	13
South Korea (Circle)	1
South Korea Hot 100 (Billboard)	5
Taiwan (Billboard)	8
US Pop Airplay (Billboard)	34

=== Monthly charts ===
Monthly chart performance for "Blue Valentine"
Chart (2025)	Position
South Korea (Circle)	1

=== Year-end charts ===
Year-end chart performance for "Blue Valentine"
Chart (2025)	Position
South Korea (Circle)	92

== Accolades ==
List of awards and nominations received by "Blue Valentine"
Ceremony	Year	Category	Result	Ref.
Korean Music Awards	2026	Song of the Year (Daesang)	Nominated	
Korean Music Awards	2026	Best K-pop Song	Nominated	
TMELive International Music Awards	2026	Global Trend Songs Top 10	Won	

Music program awards for "Blue Valentine"
Program	Date	Ref.
Inkigayo	October 26, 2025	
Inkigayo	November 9, 2025	
Inkigayo	November 16, 2025	
M Countdown	October 23, 2025	
Music Bank	October 24, 2025	
Music Bank	January 2, 2026	
Show Champion	October 22, 2025	
Show! Music Core	October 25, 2025	
Show! Music Core	November 15, 2025	
Show! Music Core	November 22, 2025	

== Publication lists ==
Publication lists for "Blue Valentine"
Publication	List	Rank	Ref.
Billboard	The 25 Best K-Pop Songs of 2025: Staff Picks	1	
The Hollywood Reporter	The 40 Best K-Pop Songs of 2025	1	
Idology	Top 20 Songs of 2025	Placed	
Rolling Stone Korea	2025 Ranking: Song of the Year	—N/a	

== Release history ==
Release history for "Blue Valentine"
Region	Date	Format	Version	Label
Various	October 13, 2025	Digital download; streaming	Original	JYP; Republic
Various	October 17, 2025	Digital download; streaming	Mixx	JYP; Republic
