= Love Me Like This =

Single by Nmixx

from the EP Expérgo
- Language: Korean
- Released: March 20, 2023
- Studio: JYPE (Seoul); Chapel Swing (Los Angeles); Sterling Sound (New Jersey)
- Genre: Hip hop; R&B; dance-pop
- Length: 3:08
- Label: JYP
- Composers: Greg Bonnick; Hayden Chapman; Taet Chesterton; Gavin Jones
- Lyricists: Lee Hye-joon (Onclassa); Jennifer Eunsoo Kim; Jang Eun-ji (153/Joombas); Shin Hye-mi (PNP); Oh Hyun-seon (Lalala Studio); Wkly

Nmixx singles chronology
"Young, Dumb, Stupid" (2023)	"Love Me Like This" (2023)	"Roller Coaster" (2023)

Music video
- "Love Me Like This" on YouTube

"Love Me Like This" is a song recorded by South Korean girl group Nmixx for their first extended play Expérgo. It was released as the EP's lead single by JYP Entertainment on March 20, 2023.

== Background and release ==
On February 10, 2023, JYP Entertainment announced Nmixx would be releasing their first extended play titled Expérgo on March 20. On March 2, the track listing was released with "Love Me Like This" announced as the title track. The first highlight medley video was released on March 3, followed by the second highlight medley video on March 16. On March 18, the music video teaser was released. The song was released alongside its music video and the extended play on March 20.

== Composition ==
"Love Me Like This" was written by Lee Hye-joon (Onclassa), Jennifer Eunsoo Kim, Jang Eun-ji (153/Joombas), Shin Hye-mi (PNP), Oh Hyun-seon (Lalala Studio), and Wkly, composed by Greg Bonnick and Hayden Chapman, and arranged by the duo as LDN Noise, with Taet Chesterton and Gavin Jones participating in the composition. It was described as a hip hop, R&B, and dance-pop song with lyrics that "express the relation of people, who are able to love themselves and each other". "Love Me Like This" was composed in the key of A-flat major, with a tempo of 97 beats per minute.

== Commercial performance ==
"Love Me Like This" debuted at number 74 on South Korea's Circle Digital Chart in the chart issue dated March 19–25, 2023. The song ascended to number 11 in the chart issue dated April 16–22, 2023.

In Singapore, the song debuted at number 30 on the RIAS Top Streaming Chart in the chart issue dated March 24–30, 2023, and number 27 on Singapore's RIAS Top Regional Chart in the chart issue dated March 17–23, 2023, ascending to number 14 in the following week.

== Promotion ==
Following the release of Expérgo, on March 20, 2023, Nmixx held a live event called "Docking Station: Expérgo" on YouTube to introduce the extended play and its songs, including "Love Me Like This", and to communicate with their fans. The group subsequently performed four music programs in the first week: Mnet's M Countdown on March 23, KBS' Music Bank on March 24, MBC's Show! Music Core on March 25, and SBS' Inkigayo on March 26. On the second week, the group performed on MBC M's Show Champion on March 29, where they won first place.

== Credits and personnel ==
Credits adapted from liner notes of Expérgo.

Studio

- JYPE Studios – recording
- Chapel Swing Studios – mixing
- Sterling Sound – mastering

Personnel

- Nmixx – vocals
  - Haewon – background vocals
  - Kyujin – background vocals
- Kriz – background vocals, vocal directing
- Lee Hye-joon (Onclassa) – lyrics
- Jennifer Eunsoo Kim – lyrics
- Jang Eun-ji (153/Joombas) – lyrics
- Shin Hye-mi (PNP) – lyrics
- Oh Hyun-seon (Lalala Studio) – lyrics
- Wkly – lyrics
- Greg Bonnick – composition
- Hayden Chapman – composition
- Taet Chesterton – composition
- Gavin Jones – composition
- LDN Noise – arrangement, instruments
- Im Chan-mi – recording
- Goo Hye-jin – recording
- Lee Sang-yeop – recording
- Tony Maserati – mixing
- David K. Younghyun – mixing
- Chris Gehringer – mastering
- Noday – vocal directing
- Shin Ji-young NYC – vocal editing

== Charts ==
=== Weekly charts ===
Weekly chart performance
Chart (2023)	Peak position
Singapore (RIAS)	30
South Korea (Circle)	11

=== Monthly charts ===
Monthly chart performance
Chart (2023)	Position
South Korea (Circle)	14

=== Year-end charts ===
Year-end chart performance
Chart (2023)	Position
South Korea (Circle)	82

== Accolades ==
Music program awards for "Love Me Like This"
Program	Date	Ref.
Show Champion	March 29, 2023	

== Release history ==
Release history
Region	Date	Format	Label
Various	March 20, 2023	Digital download; streaming	JYP

== See also ==
- List of Show Champion Chart winners (2023)
