= Expérgo =

- Digital cover

EP by Nmixx
- Released: March 20, 2023
- Genre: K-pop
- Length: 18:44
- Language: Korean
- Label: JYP

Nmixx chronology
Entwurf (2022)	Expérgo (2023)	A Midsummer Nmixx's Dream (2023)

Singles from Expérgo
- 1. "Young, Dumb, Stupid" Released: March 13, 2023; 2. "Love Me Like This" Released: March 20, 2023

Professional ratings
Review scores
Source	Rating
NME	3/5 stars
IZM	2/5 stars
AllMusic	4/5 stars

Expérgo (Latin, "To Wake Up") is the first extended play by South Korean girl group Nmixx. It was released by JYP Entertainment on March 20, 2023, and contains six tracks, including the pre-released single "Young, Dumb, Stupid", and the lead single "Love Me Like This".

== Background and release ==
On February 10, 2023, JYP Entertainment announced Nmixx would be releasing their first extended play titled Expérgo on March 20. On February 13, the promotional schedule was released. On February 27, a teaser trailer titled "Secret of Sweet Oasis" was released. On March 2, the track listing was released with "Love Me Like This" announced as the lead single. On March 3, the first highlight medley video was released, followed by the second highlight medley video on March 16. On March 5, the first concept film titled "Dizziness of Freedom" was released, followed by the second concept film titled "Wisdom, Love, Courage" on March 9. On March 13, the first track "Young, Dumb, Stupid" was pre-released alongside its music video. On March 18, the music video teaser for "Love Me Like This" was released. The extended play was released alongside the music video for "Love Me Like This" on March 20.

== Composition ==
Expérgo consists of six tracks. The first track "Young, Dumb, Stupid" was described as an "energetic", "mix-pop" song that combines hip hop and a style typical of a children's song, sampling the nursery rhyme "Frère Jacques". The second track and title track "Love Me Like This" was characterized as a hip hop and R&B song with lyrics that "express the relation of people, who are able to love themselves and each other". The third track "Paxxword" was described as having a "powerful and funky groove". The fourth track "Just Did It" was described as a song with lyrics that "express moments when things connects miraculously". The fifth track "My Gosh" was called a soft pop song with an acoustic guitar rhythm and lyrics about "the excitement of spring". The last track "Home" was described as a "hybrid" song that mixes hip hop with an "emotional" rhythm.

== Promotion ==
Following the release of Expérgo, on March 20, 2023, Nmixx held a live event called "Docking Station: Expérgo" on YouTube to introduce the extended play and communicate with their fans.

== Track listing ==
Track listing for Expérgo
No.	Title	Lyrics	Music	Arrangement	Length
1.	"Young, Dumb, Stupid"	Oh Hyun-sun (Lalala Studio); Moon Yeo-reum (Jam Factory); Lee Seu-ran; Park Sang-yu (PNP)	Brain U (The Hub); Honey Noise (The Hub); Brown Panda (The Hub); Frankie Day (The Hub); Awry (The Hub)	Brain U (The Hub); Honey Noise (The Hub); Brown Panda (The Hub)	3:10
2.	"Love Me Like This"	Lee Hye-joon (Onclassa); Jennifer Eunsoo Kim; Jang Eun-ji (153/Joombas); Shin Hye-mi (PNP); Oh Hyun-seon (Lalala Studio); Wkly	Greg Bonnick; Hayden Chapman; Taet Chesterton; Gavin Jones	LDN Noise	3:08
3.	"Paxxword"	MosPick; Young Chance	MosPick; Young Chance	MosPick	3:12
4.	"Just Did It"	Lee Seu-ran; Hezen (Music Cube)	Kenzie; Fabian Torsson; Harry Sommerdahl; Ylva Dimberg	Fabian Torsson; Harry Sommerdahl	2:58
5.	"My Gosh"	Cho Yu-ri (Jam Factory)	Aftrshok; Brain U (The Hub); Lee Chan; Ayushy (The Hub); Awry (The Hub); Chanti (The Hub); Charlotte Wilson	Aftrshok; Brain U (The Hub)	3:36
6.	"Home"	Danke (Lalala Studio); Gxxdkelvin	Aftrshok; Brain U (The Hub); Frankie Day (The Hub); Jacob Aaron (The Hub)	Aftrshok; Brain U (The Hub)	2:40
Total length:					18:44

== Credits and personnel ==
Studio

- JYPE Studios – recording (all tracks), mixing (tracks 1, 3–6), vocal editing (tracks 3, 5)
- Chapel Swing Studios – mixing (track 2)
- 821 Sound Mastering – mastering (tracks 1, 3–6)
- Sterling Sound – mastering (track 2)
- Ingrid Studio – vocal editing (tracks 4–5)

Personnel

- Nmixx – vocals (all tracks), background vocals (track 4)
  - Haewon – background vocals (tracks 1–2)
  - Sullyoon – background vocals (track 1)
  - Bae – background vocals (track 1)
  - Kyujin – background vocals (track 2)
- Frankie Day (The Hub) – background vocals, composition, vocal directing (tracks 1, 6)
- Kriz – background vocals (track 2), vocal directing (tracks 2, 4)
- Sound Kim – background vocals (track 3)
- Sophia Pae – background vocals (track 5)
- Oh Hyun-seon (Lalala Studio) – lyrics (track 1)
- Moon Yeo-reum (Jam Factory) – lyrics (track 1)
- Lee Seu-ran – lyrics (tracks 1, 4)
- Park Sang-yu (PNP) – lyrics (track 1)
- Lee Hye-joon (Onclassa) – lyrics (track 2)
- Jennifer Eunsoo Kim – lyrics (track 2)
- Jang Eun-ji (153/Joombas) – lyrics (track 2)
- Shin Hye-mi (PNP) – lyrics (track 2)
- Oh Hyun-seon (Lalala Studio) – lyrics (track 2)
- Wkly – lyrics (track 2)
- MosPick - lyrics, composition, arrangement (track 3)
- Young Chance – lyrics, composition, vocal directing, vocal editing, electronic piano (track 3)
- Hezen (Music Cube) – lyrics (track 4)
- Cho Yu-ri – lyrics (track 5)
- Danke (Lalala Studio) – lyrics (track 6)
- Gxxdkelvin – lyrics (track 6)
- Brian U (The Hub) – composition, arrangement, vocal directing, keyboard, synthesizer (tracks 1, 5–6)
- Honey Noise (The Hub) – composition, arrangement, vocal directing, keyboard, synthesizer (track 1)
- Brown Panda (The Hub) – composition, arrangement, keyboard, synthesizer (track 1)
- Awry (The Hub) – composition (tracks 1, 5), vocal directing (track 1)
- Greg Bonnick – composition (track 2)
- Hayden Chapman – composition (track 2)
- Taet Chesterton – composition (track 2)
- Gavin Jones – composition (track 2)
- Kenzie – composition (track 4)
- Fabien Torsson – composition, arrangement, instruments (track 4)
- Harry Sommerdahl – composition, arrangement, instruments (track 4)
- Ylva Dimberg – composition (track 4)
- Aftrshok – composition, arrangement, vocal directing, keyboard (tracks 5–6)
- Lee Chan – composition (track 5)
- Ayushy (The Hub) – composition, vocal directing (track 5)
- Chanti (The Hub) – composition (track 5)
- Charlotte Wilson – composition (track 5)
- Jacob Aaron (The Hub) – composition, vocal directing (track 6)
- LDN Noise – arrangement, instruments (track 2)
- Uhm Sae-hee – recording (track 1)
- Im Chan-mi – recording (tracks 1–2, 4–6)
- Goo Hye-jin – recording (tracks 1–5), vocal editing (track 5)
- Lee Sang-yeop – recording (tracks 2, 4, 6)
- Lee Tae-seop – mixing (tracks 1, 4–6)
- Tony Maserati – mixing (track 2)
- David K. Younghyun – mixing (track 2)
- Im Hong-jin – mixing, vocal editing (track 3)
- Kwon Nam-woo – mastering (tracks 1, 3–6)
- Chris Gehringer – mastering (track 2)
- Noday – vocal directing (track 2)
- Kang Dong-ha – vocal directing, vocal editing, piano (track 3)
- Vox Tune – vocal editing (tracks 1, 6)
- Shin Ji-young NYC – vocal editing (track 2)
- Jung Eun-kyung – vocal editing (tracks 4–5)
- Park Seo-hyun – guitars (track 5)
- Seo Yu-won – guitars (track 5)

== Charts ==
=== Weekly charts ===
Weekly chart performance for Expérgo
Chart (2023)	Peak position
Hungarian Albums (MAHASZ)	22
Japanese Albums (Oricon)	8
Japanese Combined Albums (Oricon)	10
Japanese Hot Albums (Billboard Japan)	33
South Korean Albums (Circle)	2
US Billboard 200	122
US Heatseekers Albums (Billboard)	2
US Independent Albums (Billboard)	16
US World Albums (Billboard)	5

=== Monthly charts ===
Monthly chart performance for Expérgo
Chart (2023)	Peak position
Japanese Albums (Oricon)	35
South Korean Albums (Circle)	4

=== Year-end charts ===
Year-end chart performance for Expérgo
Chart (2023)	Position
South Korean Albums (Circle)	33

== Certifications ==
Certifications for Expérgo
Region	Certification	Certified units/sales
South Korea (KMCA)	3× Platinum	750,000^{^}
^{^} Shipments figures based on certification alone.

== Release history ==
Release history for Expérgo
Region	Date	Format	Label
Various	March 20, 2023	Digital download; streaming	JYP
South Korea	March 20, 2023	CD	JYP
United States	March 24, 2023	CD	JYP; The Orchard
