= Haewon (singer) =

South Korean singer and dancer (born 2003)

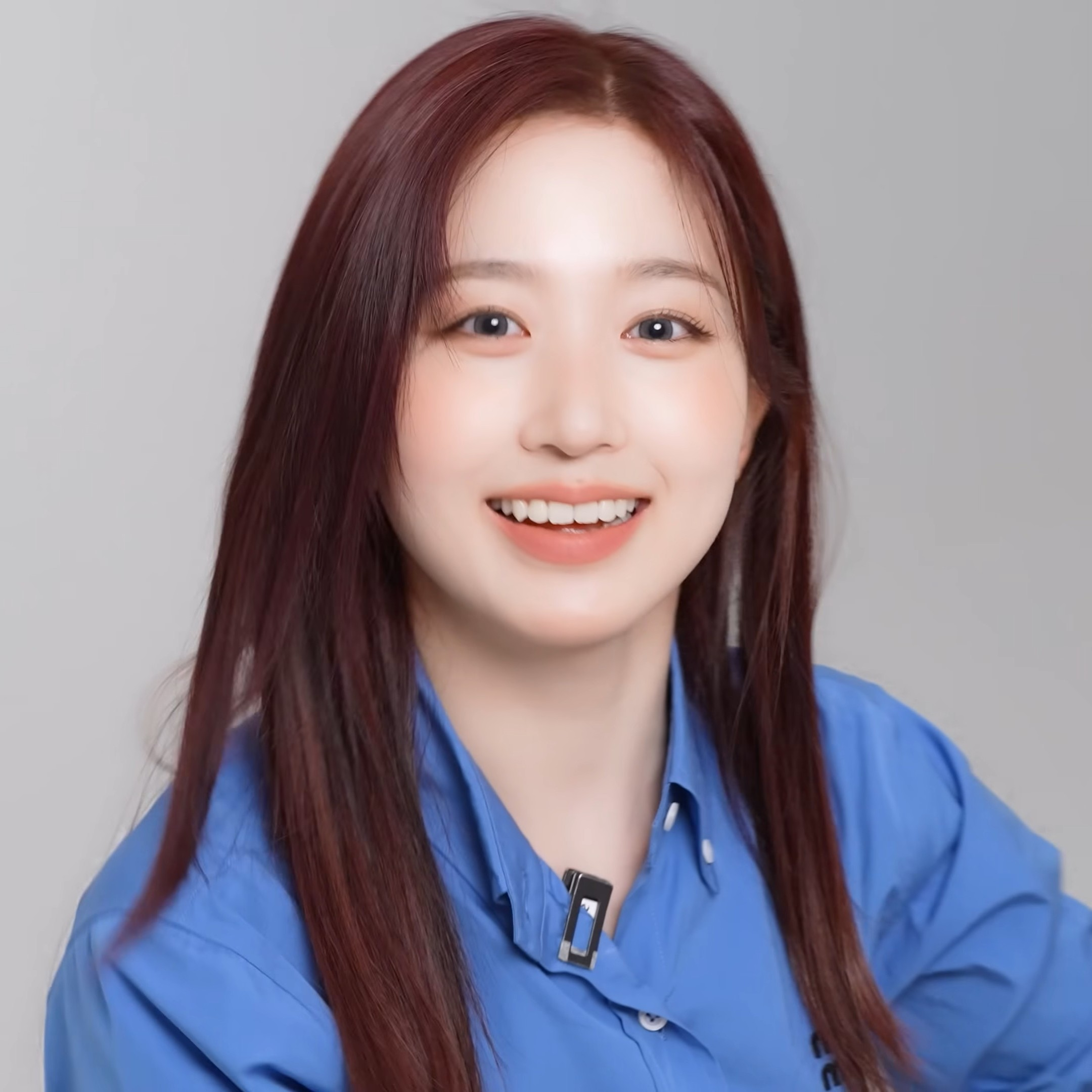
- Haewon in 2025
- Born: Oh Hae-won; February 25, 2003 (age 23); Incheon, South Korea
- Occupation: Singer
- Musical career
- Genre: K-pop
- Instrument: Vocals
- Years active: 2022–present
- Label: JYP
- Member of: Nmixx

Korean name
- Hangul: 오해원
- RR: O Haewon
- MR: O Haewŏn

Signature
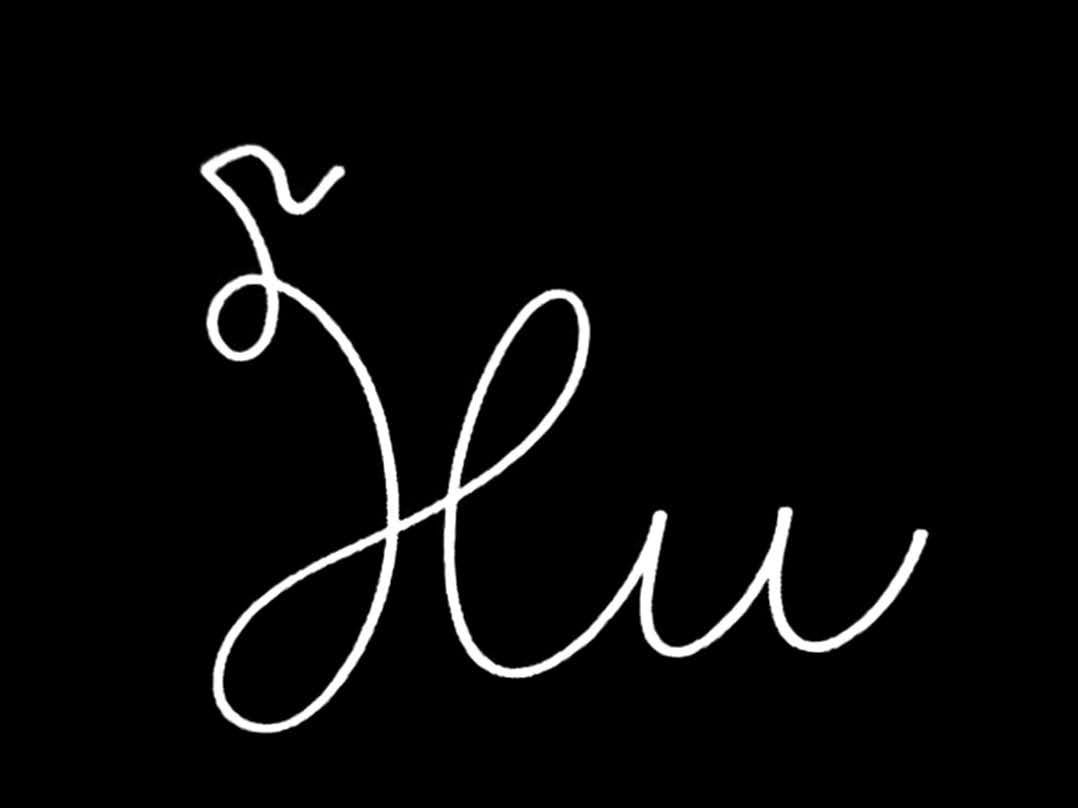

Oh Hae-won (Korean: 오해원; born February 25, 2003), known mononymously as Haewon (해원), is a South Korean singer and dancer. She is the leader of the girl group Nmixx under JYP Entertainment. Beyond her activities with the group, she is also known for her television and variety show appearances.

== Early life and education ==
Oh Hae-won was born on February 25, 2003, in Incheon, South Korea. During elementary school, her English teacher played a video of Imagine Dragons performing "Demons", which left a lasting emotional impact on her despite her limited understanding of English at the time. In March 2022, Haewon graduated from Dunchon High School along with her bandmate Lily.

== Career ==
=== 2017–2021: Pre-debut ===
Haewon joined JYP Entertainment as a trainee after passing a 2017 girl group open audition. During her trainee days, she gained a reputation as an ace due to her ranking first in monthly evaluations, and she was rewarded with a trip to JYP's training camp in the United States.

On November 4, 2021, Haewon was introduced as the sixth member of JYPn (Nmixx's pre-debut name) through a video of her covering Stephanie Poetri's "I Love You 3000".

=== 2022–present: Debut with Nmixx and solo activities ===
On February 22, 2022, Haewon debuted as a member of Nmixx with the release of their first single album Ad Mare and its title track "O.O".

In her first individual magazine profile, published in Marie Claire Korea's June 2025 issue following the release of Nmixx's fourth EP Fe3O4: Forward, Haewon discussed her role as the group's leader, her ambition to write a song drawing on her own personal experiences, and her hope that people could "love freely, without jealousy or envy". In the same interview, she said she had continued writing lyrics since her trainee days and hoped to eventually release a song built around her own experiences.

In a second individual magazine profile, published in Dazed Korea's October 2025 issue in collaboration with the fashion brand &Other Stories, Haewon discussed her fondness for vintage aesthetics and older Korean music, saying old songs often "sound like poetry" to her, and reflected on her approach to leading Nmixx, saying she preferred working with ambitious bandmates because she disliked settling for second-best choices.

On September 23, 2022, Haewon was announced as "K-pop assistant" for the Global Chart Forum segment of Music Universe K-909. On December 4, 2023, it was announced that Haewon would be co-hosting Dilemma Game.

On March 19, 2024, Haewon was confirmed as the host for Workdol season 2. On July 11, 2024, Haewon returned as a host for Dilemma Game season 2. On July 16, 2024, it was reported that Haewon would be serving as one of the hosts for that year's Idol Star Athletics Championships. As part of a Workdol episode, Haewon made an appearance as a weather presenter for JTBC Newsroom on August 6, 2024. In September 2024, Haewon sung "Maru is a Puppy" as part of the soundtrack for a webtoon of the same name.

Following her stint on Workdol, media analysis categorized her as a "next-generation variety blue chip". Critics emphasized her capability to maintain composure and comedic dominance while working alongside veteran entertainers on major network channels, driving every episode she hosted to over a million views. Her performance was credited with blending reliability and professionalism, which historically redefined how rookie idols transition into standalone television personalities. For her work hosting Workdol, Haewon was nominated in two categories at the 61st Baeksang Arts Awards in 2025: Best Female Variety Performer and the Popularity Award. Industry reviewers emphasized that the nomination marked a critical milestone for a fourth-generation idol, formally validating her individual artistry and commercial impact independent of her group's collective identity.

In April 2025, cultural critics highlighted Haewon as a prominent figure driving a new wave in the South Korean variety show industry. Media analysis noted that she transcended the typical secondary roles usually assigned to female idols in male-dominated entertainment spaces, establishing a unique individual presence through her quick wit and meme-literate comedic timing.

In December 2025, Haewon fronted a digital cover feature and collaboration with financial-technology company Kakao Pay for Esquire Korea, released to coincide with the launch of Kakao Pay's financial literacy mini-book Today's Finance; the collaboration included a video interview published on Esquire's official channels in which Haewon discussed everyday attitudes toward personal finance.

== Other ventures ==
=== Endorsements ===
In July 2024, Haewon was selected as advertising model for online part-time job matching service, Daangn Alba. On November 29, 2024, Haewon was announced as brand ambassador for Korean hangover relief product, Condition.

=== Philanthropy ===
On July 15, 2024, Haewon and the Workdol production team donated ₩10 million to the Korea Childhood Leukemia Foundation (KCLF).

== Discography ==
=== Singles ===
==== Collaborations ====
Title	Year	Album	Ref.
"Is it still beautiful?" (여전히 아름다운지) (with Park Jin-joo, Ailee, and Mijoo)	2025	Non-album singles	
"Butterfly" (with Winter Song Mates)	2025	Non-album singles	

==== As featured artist ====
Title	Year	Peak chart positions	Album	Ref.
Title	Year	KOR Circle	Album	Ref.
"54321" (pH-1 feat. Haewon)	2025	— (Note: "54321" did not enter the Circle Digital Chart, but peaked at number 78 on the Circle Download Chart.)	What Have We Done	
"—" denotes releases that did not chart or were not released in that region.

=== Soundtrack appearances ===
Title	Year	Album	Ref.
"Maru is a Puppy" (마루는 강쥐)	2024	Maru is a Puppy OST (마루는 강쥐 X 해원)	

=== Songwriting credits ===
All song credits are adapted from the Korea Music Copyright Association's (KOMCA) database, unless otherwise noted.

Year	Album	Artist(s)	Song	Lyrics		Music	
Year	Album	Artist(s)	Song	Credited	With	Credited	With
2025	What Have We Done	pH-1 & Herself	"54321"	Yes	pH-1	No	—N/a
2025	Blue Valentine	Nmixx	"Podium"	Yes	Lee Seu-ran, Lim Soo-ran (Lalala Studio)	No	—N/a
2025	Blue Valentine	Nmixx	"Crush on You"	Yes	Since	No	—N/a
2026	K-POPS! (Music from and inspired by K-POPS! Motion Picture)	Nmixx & Anderson .Paak	"Caution"	Yes	Brandon Anderson, Lily, Dwayne Abernathy Jr., John Yang, Awrii (The Hub)	Yes	Brandon Anderson, Lily, Dwayne Abernathy Jr., John Yang, Awrii (The Hub)
2026	Strange Muse	Lily and Herself	"Sing to the Moon" (너는 달	Yes	Jang Da-in (Artiffect), Kim Su-ji, Lily	No	—N/a

== Filmography ==
=== Television shows ===
Year	Title	Role	Notes	Ref.
2022	Music Universe K-909	Host	K-pop assistant for Global Chart Forum segment	
2023–2024	Dilemma Game	Host	Seasons 1 and 2	
2024	Idol Star Athletics Championships	Host		
2026	Whenever Possible	Guest	With Sullyoon	

=== Web shows ===
Year	Title	Role	Notes	Ref.
2024–2025	Workdol	Host	Seasons 2 and 3	

== Awards and nominations ==
Award ceremony	Year	Category	Nominee / Work	Result	Ref.
Brand of the Year Awards	2024	Female Web Variety Show MC	Haewon	Nominated	
Baeksang Arts Awards	2025	Best Female Variety Performer	Haewon	Nominated	
Baeksang Arts Awards	2025	Popularity Award	Haewon	Nominated	
