= Entwurf =

- Digital cover

Single album by Nmixx
- Released: September 19, 2022
- Length: 11:12
- Language: Korean
- Label: JYP

Nmixx chronology
Ad Mare (2022)	Entwurf (2022)	Expérgo (2023)

Singles from Entwurf
- 1. "Dice" Released: September 19, 2022

Entwurf (meaning "draft" or "design" in German) is the second single album by South Korean girl group Nmixx. The single album was released by JYP Entertainment on September 19, 2022, and contains four tracks, including lead single "Dice" as well as the track "Cool (Your Rainbow)", and instrumentals for both songs. It was the group's last album to feature Jinni, who withdrew from the group on December 9, 2022.

== Background ==
On August 22, 2022, JYP Entertainment announced that Nmixx would release their second single album, through a promotional poster confirming its release date on September 19, 2022, seven months after their debut with the first single album Ad Mare.

The announcement was also accompanied by the creation of the groups Twitter account under the name of XXIWN.

On August 23, two new contents were introduced in a different teasing method using two accounts, where they posted an image of a game invitation to Nswer (fandom name) through its official account. The flat figures made of dark colors, dotted lines with an English text, says 'A mysterious adversary who appeared in front of the adventure to MIXXTOPIA'. On their Twitter account, they posted the phrase 'What is None minus 1?' on the same invitation.

Between August 24 and 30, a series of teaser posters were published daily, with a puzzle to discover the phrase behind the game.

== Promotion ==
The girl group held a showcase at Yes24 Live Hall in eastern Seoul's Gwangjin District for the release of "Entwurf." The seven members performed their new lead track "Dice" and revealed its board game-inspired music video.

== Track listing ==
Track listing for Entwurf
No.	Title	Lyrics	Music	Arrangement	Length
1.	"Dice"	Dr. Jo (153/Joombas); Myung Hye-in (Jamfactory); Danke (Lalala Studio); Cha Lee-rin (153/Joombas); Baek Sae-im (Jamfactory); Zaya (153/Joombas); Park Ji-hyun (153/Joombas)	Armadillo; Rangga; Frankie Day (The Hub); Charlotte Wilson (The Hub); The Hub 88; Jonkind	Armadillo; Rangga	2:45
2.	"Cool (Your Rainbow)"	Park Rang (Verygoods); Jo Yu-ri; Hannah Robinson; Call Me Loop	Armadillo; Hannah Robinson; Call Me Loop; Hoji; Nile Lee; Won	Armadillo	2:50
3.	"Dice" (Instrumental)				2:45
4.	"Cool (Your Rainbow)" (Instrumental)				2:50
Total length:					11:12

== Charts ==
=== Weekly charts ===
Weekly chart performance for Entwurf
Chart (2022)	Peak position
Japanese Hot Albums (Billboard Japan)	53
South Korean Albums (Circle)	1

=== Monthly charts ===
Monthly chart performance for Entwurf
Chart (2022)	Peak position
South Korean Albums (Circle)	2

=== Year-end charts ===
Year-end chart performance for Entwurf
Chart (2022)	Position
South Korean Albums (Circle)	30

== Certifications and sales ==
Certifications and sales for Entwurf
Region	Certification	Certified units/sales
South Korea (KMCA)	2× Platinum	562,596

== Release history ==
Release history for Entwurf
Region	Date	Format	Label
South Korea	September 19, 2022	CD	JYP
Various	September 19, 2022	Digital download; streaming	JYP
