= Dice (Nmixx song) =

Single by NMIXX

from the album Entwurf
- Language: Korean
- Released: September 19, 2022
- Genre: Pop; jazz; trap; hip hop
- Length: 2:45
- Label: JYP
- Composers: Armadillo; Rangga; Frankie Day (The Hub); Charlotte Wilson (The Hub); The Hub 88; Jonkind
- Lyricists: Dr. Jo (153/Joombas); Charin (153/Joombas); Zaya (153/Joombas); Park Ji-hyun (153/Joombas); Myung Hye-in (Jam Factory); Baek Sae-im (Jam Factory); Danke (Lalala Studio)

Nmixx singles chronology
"O.O" (2022)	"Dice" (2022)	"Funky Glitter Christmas" (2022)

Music video
- "Dice" on YouTube

"Dice" is a song recorded by South Korean girl group Nmixx for their second single album Entwurf. It was released as the single album's lead single by JYP Entertainment on September 19, 2022.

== Background and release ==
On August 22, 2022, JYP Entertainment announced Nmixx would be releasing their second single album Entwurf on September 19. On August 31, the track listing for Entwurf was released with "Dice" announced as the lead single. The music video teaser was released on September 16 and 17. On September 18, the highlight medley teaser video was released. The song was released alongside its music video and the single album on September 19.

== Composition ==
"Dice" was written by Dr. Jo, Charin, Zaya, and Park Ji-hyun from 153/Joombas, Myung Hye-in (Jam Factory), and Baek Sae-im from Jam Factory, and Danke from Lalala Studio. The song was composed and arranged by Armadillo and Rangga alongside Frankie Day, and Charlotte Wilson from The Hub, The Hub 88, and Jonkind for the composition. It was described as a pop song with elements of jazz, trap, and hip hop, with lyrics about "the narrative of a mysterious adversary who appears in the dice game with the Nmixx as [the adversary] opponent". "Dice" was composed in the key of G major, with a tempo of 131 beats per minute.

== Promotion ==
Following the release of Entwurf, the group held a live event titled "New Frontier: Entwurf" on the same day, to introduce the single album and its songs including "Dice". They subsequently performed four music programs: Mnet's M Countdown on September 22, KBS's Music Bank on September 23, MBC's Show! Music Core on September 24, and SBS's Inkigayo on September 25.

== Credits and personnel ==
Credits adapted from Melon.

Studios

- JYPE Studios – recording
- Chapel Swing Studios – mixing
- 821 Sound Mastering – mastering
- Ingrid studio – vocal editing

Personnel

- Nmixx – vocals
- Ejae – background vocals
- Dr. Jo (153/Joombas) – lyrics, vocal directing
- Charin (153/Joombas) – lyrics
- Zaya (153/Joombas) – lyrics
- Park Ji-hyun (153/Joombas) – lyrics
- Myung Hye-in (Jam Factory) – lyrics
- Baek Sae-im (Jam Factory) – lyrics
- Danke (Lalala Studio) – lyrics
- Armadillo – composition, arrangement, various instruments, vocal directing,
- Rangga – composition, arrangement
- Frankie Day (The Hub) – composition
- Charlotte Wilson (The Hub) – composition, vocal directing
- The Hub 88 – composition
- Jonkind – composition
- Jason Lee – alto saxophone, tenor saxophone, baritone saxophone
- Jeong Sang-su – trumpet
- Chu Myung-ho – trombone
- Um Se-hee – recording
- Tony Maserati – mixing
- David K. Younghyun – mixing
- Kwon Nam-woo – mastering
- Brian U – vocal directing
- Jeong Eun-kyung – vocal editing

== Charts ==
=== Weekly charts ===
Weekly chart performance for "Dice"
Chart (2022)	Peak position
Global 200 (Billboard)	155
Japan (Japan Hot 100)	56
Japan Combined Singles (Oricon)	39
New Zealand Hot Singles (RMNZ)	40
Singapore (RIAS)	20
South Korea (Billboard)	16
South Korea (Circle)	49
Vietnam (Vietnam Hot 100)	74

=== Monthly charts ===
Monthly chart performance for "Dice"
Chart (2022)	Peak position
South Korea (Circle)	52

== Release history ==
Release history for "Dice"
Region	Date	Format	Label
Various	September 19, 2022	Digital download; streaming	JYP
