= Young, Dumb, Stupid =

Single by Nmixx

from the EP Expérgo
- Language: Korean
- Released: March 13, 2023
- Genre: Hip hop
- Length: 3:10
- Label: JYP
- Composers: Brain U (The Hub); Honey Noise (The Hub); Brown Panda (The Hub); Frankie Day (The Hub); Awry (The Hub)
- Lyricists: Oh Hyun-seon (Lalala Studio); Moon Yeo-reum (Jam Factory); Lee Seu-ran (Jam Factory); Park Sang-yu (PNP)

Nmixx singles chronology
"Funky Glitter Christmas" (2022)	"Young, Dumb, Stupid" (2023)	"Love Me Like This" (2023)

Music video
- "Young, Dumb, Stupid" on YouTube

"Young, Dumb, Stupid" is a song recorded by South Korean girl group Nmixx for their first extended play Expérgo. It was released as the EP's pre-release single by JYP Entertainment on March 13, 2023.

== Background and release ==
On February 10, 2023, JYP Entertainment announced that Nmixx would be releasing their first extended play titled Expérgo on March 20. On March 2, the track listing for the EP was released, with "Young, Dumb, Stupid" announced as a pre-release track. The song along with its music video was released on March 13.

== Composition ==
"Young, Dumb, Stupid" was written by Oh Hyun-seon (Lalala Studio), Moon Yeo-reum (Jam Factory), Lee Seu-ran (Jam Factory), and Park Sang-yu (PNP), and composed by members of the production team The Hub, including Brain U, Honey Noise, Brown Panda, Frankie Day, and Awry. The song was described as an "energetic", "Mixx-Pop" song that combines hip hop and a style typical of a children's song, sampling the nursery rhyme "Frère Jacques".

== Critical reception ==
Professional ratings
Review scores
Source	Rating
IZM	1.5/5 stars

Lim Dong-yeop wrote for IZM that the song's "familiar tune immediately arouses initial interest, but interest waned due to the simple melody that everyone knew".

== Commercial performance ==
"Young, Dumb, Stupid" debuted at number 130 on South Korea's Circle Digital Chart in the chart issue dated March 12–18, 2023. It peaked at number 50 in the chart issue dated April 9–15, 2023.

In Singapore, the song debuted at number 27 on the RIAS Top Regional Chart in the chart issue dated March 10–16, 2023, ascending to and peaking at number 17 in the following week.

== Charts ==
=== Weekly charts ===
Weekly chart performance for "Young, Dumb, Stupid"
Chart (2023)	Peak position
Singapore Reg. (RIAS)	17
South Korea (Circle)	50

=== Monthly charts ===
Monthly chart performance for "Young, Dumb, Stupid"
Chart (2023)	Peak position
South Korea (Circle)	68

== Release history ==
Release history for "Young, Dumb, Stupid"
Region	Date	Format	Label
Various	March 13, 2023	Digital download; streaming	JYP
