= Nmixx =

South Korean girl group

- Nmixx in 2026; L-R: Lily, Kyujin, Sullyoon, Jiwoo, Haewon, Bae

Background information
- Origin: Seoul, South Korea
- Genre: K-pop
- Years active: 2022–present
- Labels: JYP; Republic
- Members: Lily; Haewon; Sullyoon; Bae; Jiwoo; Kyujin
- Past members: Jinni
- Website: nmixx.jype.com

Nmixx (/ˈɛnmɪks/; Korean: 엔믹스; stylized in all caps) is a South Korean girl group formed by Squ4d, a division of JYP Entertainment. The group is composed of six members: Lily, Haewon, Sullyoon, Bae, Jiwoo, and Kyujin. Nmixx was originally a seven-piece group; Jinni departed from the lineup on December 9, 2022, for personal reasons.

Nmixx debuted on February 22, 2022, with the single album Ad Mare. In 2023, the group released their first extended play Expérgo and its single "Love Me Like This", which peaked at number 11 on South Korea's Circle Digital Chart. Nmixx's first full-length studio album Blue Valentine was released in October 2025 to commercial success. The album's lead single became their first number-one song on the Circle Digital Chart, spending four weeks at the top spot.

== Name ==
Logo of Nmixx

The name Nmixx combines the letter "N", which stands for "now", "new", "next", and the unknown "n", and the word "mix", which symbolizes combination and diversity, altogether meaning "the best combination for a new era".

== Career ==
=== 2021–2022: Debut and Jinni's departure ===
On July 9, 2021, JYP Entertainment announced a new girl group would be debuting in February 2022, its first since Itzy in 2019. From July 16 to 25, JYP Entertainment made pre-orders available for a limited edition of the group's debut package, titled Blind Package, which included the group's debut album and album-related materials. The members of the group, tentatively known as JYPn, were revealed through various dance videos and song covers from August 6 to November 19 (in order: Jinni, Jiwoo, Kyujin, Sullyoon, Bae, Haewon, and Lily).

On January 26, 2022, JYP Entertainment announced the group's name to be Nmixx. On February 2, it was announced that they would debut on February 22 with the release of Ad Mare. On February 18, JYP Entertainment announced that the group's debut showcase, originally scheduled for February 22, would be postponed to March 1 after group member Bae tested positive for COVID-19. Nmixx collaborated with the DreamWorks Animation's Gabby's Dollhouse to release the Korean version of "Hey Gabby!", alongside the B-side "Sprinkle Party", on May 2. They also participated in Project Ribbon's Summer Vacation Project, along with Fromis 9 and Oh My Girl Banhana, to cover Rainbow's "Kiss", from their 2009 debut EP Gossip Girl. The song was released on July 31.

On September 19, Nmixx released their second single album Entwurf alongside the lead single "Dice". The group released their first "Intermixxion" single (described by JYP as a special track dropped as a standalone track in between official releases) and first Christmas song, "Funky Glitter Christmas", on November 23. On December 9, JYP Entertainment announced that Jinni had terminated her contract with the company due to personal reasons, and had departed from the group, while Nmixx would continue as a six-member ensemble.

=== 2023–2024: Extended plays, Fe3O4 trilogy, showcase tour and fan concerts ===
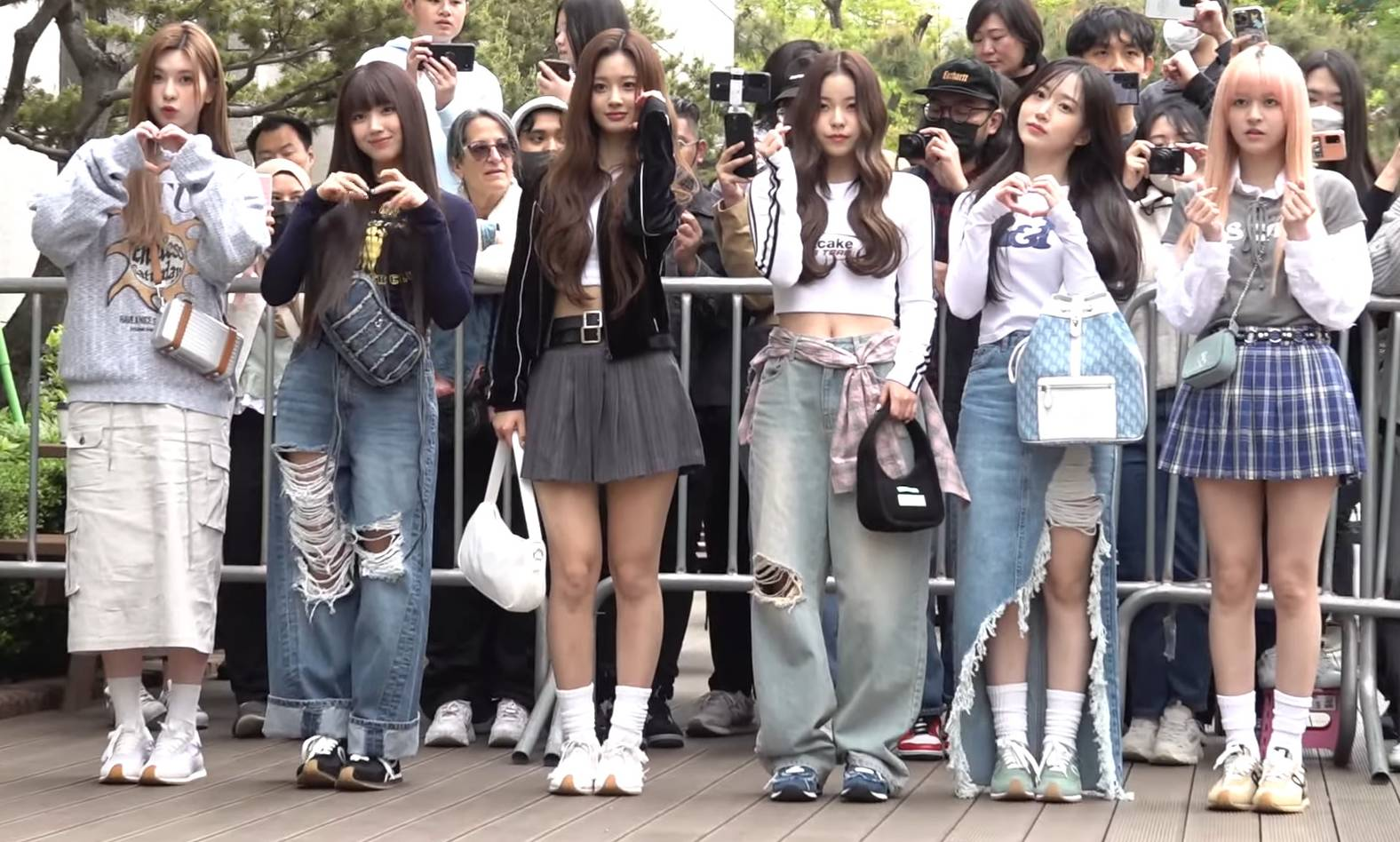
Nmixx in April 2023

On March 20, 2023, Nmixx released their first extended play Expérgo, with the lead single "Love Me Like This", which won them their first music program award on Show Champion. They embarked on the Nice to Mixx You Showcase Tour, consisting of 13 dates across the United States and Asia, beginning in May. On May 31, it was reported that JYP Entertainment has expanded their partnership with Republic Records to include Nmixx, along with Xdinary Heroes, in their strategic label deal, which previously included Twice, Itzy and Stray Kids. On July 11, Nmixx released their third single album A Midsummer Nmixx's Dream, which consists of four tracks, including the pre-release single "Roller Coaster", and the lead single "Party O'Clock" written and composed by J.Y. Park. On October 7 and 8, Nmixx held their first fan concerts, titled Nmixx Change Up: Mixx University, at the Jangchung Arena in Seoul. The group went on to hold the fan concert abroad at Hong Kong, Taipei and Macau in 2024.

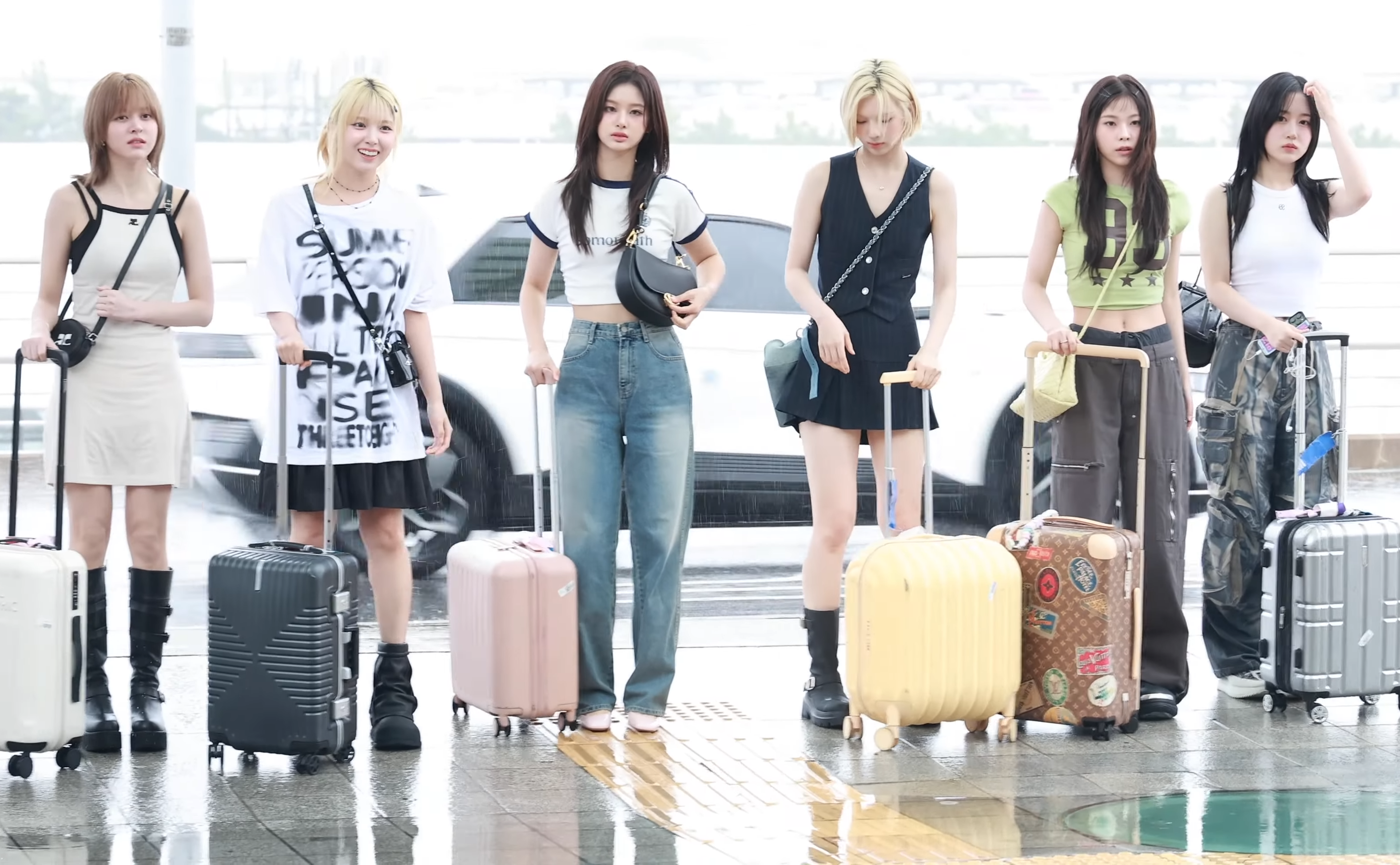
Nmixx at Incheon International Airport heading to Macau for the 2024 TMEA in July 2024

On January 15, 2024, Nmixx released their second EP Fe3O4: Break, with the pre-release single "Soñar (Breaker)" and the lead single "Dash". From October 4 to 6, they held their second fan concerts titled Nmixx Change Up: Mixx Lab, at the Jangchung Arena in Seoul. Nmixx's third EP, Fe3O4: Stick Out, was released on August 19, with the lead single "See That?". In September 2024, the group performed on Tiny Desk Korea, the South Korean adaptation of NPR Music's Tiny Desk Concerts. The performance was reuploaded to the NPR Music YouTube channel four months later, making Nmixx the first K-pop girl group to appear on the channel. On October 11, the group released the Spanish version of "Soñar".

=== 2025–present: First fan meeting, studio album and world tour ===
On March 17, 2025, Nmixx released their fourth EP, Fe3O4: Forward. The pre-release single "High Horse" was released on March 4. On February 24, the group made a surprise appearance at the 2025 Viña del Mar Festival in Viña del Mar, Chile. On April 27, Nmixx became the first K-pop girl group to throw the first pitch and perform at the Taipei Dome. On May 10, Nmixx performed as part of the lineup for the Wango Tango festival at the Huntington Beach. On July 12, Nmixx held their first official fan meeting, titled Nswer Vacation, at the Korea University Hwajeong Gymnasium in Seoul.

On October 13, Nmixx released their first studio album Blue Valentine, with the lead single of the same name. On November 29, Nmixx embarked on their first world tour, titled Episode 1: Zero Frontier, with two shows at the Inspire Arena in Incheon.

In February 2026, the group headlined the Viña del Mar Festival, having attended the 2025 version and becoming the first ever K-pop group to perform in the festival. On February 16, 2026, Nmixx became the first K-pop group to perform at the Carnival of São Paulo, where they revealed a new song "Tic Tic", featuring Pabllo Vittar, which was then released on February 26 as a digital single. On May 11, Nmixx released their fifth EP, Heavy Serenade, alongside the lead single of the same name, while the music video for the track "Crescendo" was pre-released on April 28. On October 19, Nmixx released their sixth EP Strange Muse, with the lead single "Birthday Wish". On December 9, Nmixx would be making their Japanese debut with the album N=Mixx, which contains twelve tracks including Japanese versions of their previously released songs.

== Artistry ==
Gladys Yeo of NME described Nmixx as "vocal powerhouses", describing their vocal skills as "unparalleled" within their generation of K-Pop. Likewise, Mary Siroky of Consequence said that Nmixx "often" delivers "great vocal performances". Despite the praise towards their vocals, Nmixx's signature style of music, termed "Mixxpop" or "Mixx Pop" (stylized in all caps), was initially controversial.

Taylor Glasby of Dazed said that Nmixx's debut single, "O.O", had "choppy arrangement" and "loosely structured lyrics", making note of the fact that ten lyricists were credited for the track. Glasby wrote that the song created "the biggest ruckus of 2022 [...] across the entire breadth of the K-pop community". Lily said that the reception towards the song was "sometimes sad and hard to read about", but also stated that "mixed opinions are better than no opinions". Writing for Mnet Plus Magazine, Park Soojin said that Mixxpop was less accessible to the public due to "combining vastly different genres into a single song". Both Yeo and Park said that Nmixx's 2023 EP Expérgo offered a more public-friendly version of Mixxpop.

== Endorsements ==
In September 2022, Nmixx were appointed global ambassadors of Spanish luxury fashion house Loewe. Before the announcement, they appeared on the July 2022 cover of Harper's Bazaar Korea in Loewe's Fall 2022 pre-collection. In December 2023, they modelled for the brand's Spring/Summer 2023 pre-collection campaign. In March 2023, they represented the brand in their attendance of Paris Fashion Week and Milan Fashion Week.

In July 2023, Nmixx became the muse of ReFa Heart Brush, a product by Japanese beauty brand ReFa, which was featured in their music video for "Party O'Clock". They collaborated with the brand in the digital cover of the August 2023 issue of Cosmopolitan Korea.

== Members ==
=== Current ===
- Lily (릴리) – vocalist
- Haewon (해원) – leader, vocalist
- Sullyoon (설윤) – vocalist, dancer
- Bae (배이) – vocalist, dancer
- Jiwoo (지우) – rapper, vocalist, dancer
- Kyujin (규진) – rapper, vocalist, dancer

=== Former ===
- Jinni (지니) (2022) – vocalist, dancer, rapper

== Discography ==
- Blue Valentine (2025)

== Videography ==
=== Music videos ===
List of music videos, showing year released, and name of the director(s)
Title	Year	Director(s)	Ref.
"O.O"	2022	Seong Won-Mo, Moon Seok-Ho (Digipedi)	
"Dice"	2022	Highqualityfish	
"Funky Glitter Christmas"	2022	Woonghui (wwhh)	
"Young, Dumb, Stupid"	2023	Hong Jae-hwan, Lee Hye-su (Swisher)	
"Love Me Like This"	2023	Beomjin pka Paranoid Paradigm	
"Roller Coaster"	2023	Soze (Studio Gaze)	
"Party O'Clock"	2023	Kwon Yong-soo (Studio Saccharin)	
"Soñar (Breaker)"	2023	SUI (A Years Production)	
"Dash"	2024	Lee Jun-yeop (Keep Us Weird)	
"Like Magic" (with J.Y. Park, Stray Kids and Itzy)	2024	Jan'Qui (Keep Us Weird)	
"Feifei" (蜚蜚)	2024	Unknown	
"See That?" (별별별)	2024	Soze (Studio Gaze)	
"Know About Me"	2025	Hasegawa Anderson (Digipedi)	
"Mexe" (with Pabllo Vittar)	2025	Jaewon Ham (88 Gymnastic Heroes)	
"Blue Valentine"	2025	Yu Kwang Goeng	
"Tic Tic" (featuring Pabllo Vittar)	2026	Unknown	
"Crescendo"	2026	Jeongyeon Lee	
"Heavy Serenade"	2026	Lee Youngeum	
"Birthday Wish" (긴 소원)	2026	Lafic	

=== Other videos ===
List of other videos, showing year released and name of the director(s)
Title	Year	Director(s)	Notes	Ref.
"Cool (Your Rainbow)"	2022	Yoo Chung	Special video	
"Paxxword"	2023	Yoo Chung	Special video	
"My Gosh"	2023	Unknown	Special video	
"Run for Roses"	2024	Hivideo	Performance video	
"Sickuhh" (featuring Kid Milli)	2024	Homarjong	Visualizer	
"Love Is Lonely"	2024	Soze (Studio Gaze)	Special video	
"High Horse"	2025	Minjae Kim	Performance visualizer	
"XOXO"	2025	Unknown	Live clip	
"Spinnin' on It"	2025	Sion Park, Yejin An	—N/a	
"Adore U"	2025	Sukhoon (Mat Production)	Track video	
"Reality Hurts"	2025	Hun (M.Mat Production)	Track video	
"Shape of Love"	2026	Unknown	Special video	

== Filmography ==
=== Web shows ===
Web shows appearances
Year	Title	Notes	Ref.
2022–2024	Mixxtream	Behind the scenes of the members' activities	
2022–present	Pick Nmixx	Weekly variety shows	
2022	Nmixx Quest	Variety show series	

== Live performances ==
=== Concerts and tours ===
- Nice to Mixx You Showcase Tour (2023)
- Nmixx Change Up: Mixx University Fan Concert (2023–2024)
- Nmixx Change Up: Mixx Lab Fan Concert (2024–2025)
- Episode 1: Zero Frontier World Tour (2025–2026)

==== Nmixx Change Up: Mixx Lab Fan Concert ====
Date	City	Country	Venue	Ref.
October 4, 2024	Seoul	South Korea	Jangchung Arena	
October 5, 2024	Seoul	South Korea	Jangchung Arena	
October 6, 2024	Seoul	South Korea	Jangchung Arena	
January 11, 2025	Tokyo	Japan	Lala Arena Tokyo Bay	
January 12, 2025	Tokyo	Japan	Lala Arena Tokyo Bay	
February 19, 2025	Mexico City	Mexico	Auditorio BB	
February 20, 2025	Mexico City	Mexico	Auditorio BB	
February 22, 2025	Santiago	Chile	Teatro Caupolican	
February 23, 2025	Santiago	Chile	Teatro Caupolican	
February 28, 2025	São Paulo	Brazil	Vibra São Paulo	
April 19, 2025	Taipei	Taiwan	NTSU Arena	
April 20, 2025	Taipei	Taiwan	NTSU Arena	
April 26, 2025	Hong Kong	China	AsiaWorld-Summit	
May 2, 2025	Manila	Philippines	SMX Convention Center	
May 4, 2025	Bangkok	Thailand	Thunder Dome	
May 31, 2025	Tokyo	Japan	Tokyo Metropolitan Gymnasium	
June 1, 2025	Tokyo	Japan	Tokyo Metropolitan Gymnasium	
June 6, 2025	Melbourne	Australia	Festival Hall	
June 8, 2025	Sydney	Australia	Hordern Pavilion	
June 28, 2025	Macau	China	The Londoner Arena	
June 29, 2025	Macau	China	The Londoner Arena	

==== Episode 1: Zero Frontier World Tour ====
Date	City	Country	Venue	Ref.
November 29, 2025	Incheon	South Korea	Inspire Arena	
November 30, 2025	Incheon	South Korea	Inspire Arena	
March 17, 2026	Madrid	Spain	Palacio Vistalegre	
March 20, 2026	Amsterdam	Netherlands	AFAS Live	
March 22, 2026	Paris	France	Salle Pleyel	
March 24, 2026	Frankfurt	Germany	Myticket Jahrhunderthalle	
March 26, 2026	London	United Kingdom	Eventim Apollo	
March 29, 2026	Toronto	Canada	Great Canadian Toronto	
March 31, 2026	New York City	United States	Brooklyn Paramount	
April 2, 2026	National Harbor	United States	The Theatre at MGM National Harbor	
April 4, 2026	Irving	United States	The Pavilion at Toyota Music Factory	
April 7, 2026	Oakland	United States	Paramount Theatre	
April 9, 2026	Los Angeles	United States	YouTube Theater	
June 13, 2026	Bangkok	Thailand	UOB Live, EmSphere	
June 20, 2026	Singapore		The Star Theatre	
July 12, 2026	Kaohsiung	Taiwan	Kaohsiung Arena	
July 13, 2026	Kaohsiung	Taiwan	Kaohsiung Arena	
July 25, 2026	Hong Kong	China	AsiaWorld-Expo, Hall 10	
July 26, 2026	Hong Kong	China	AsiaWorld-Expo, Hall 10	
August 8, 2026	Tokyo	Japan	Keio Arena Tokyo	
August 9, 2026	Tokyo	Japan	Keio Arena Tokyo	
November 27, 2026	Incheon	South Korea	Inspire Arena	
November 28, 2026	Incheon	South Korea	Inspire Arena	
November 29, 2026	Incheon	South Korea	Inspire Arena	

=== Festivals ===
List of festival performances, showing date, location, event, and performed song(s)
Date	City	Country	Event	Performed song(s)	Ref.
February 16, 2026	São Paulo	Brazil	São Paulo Carnival	"O.O", "Dice", "Love Me Like This", "Soñar (Breaker)", "Rico"	
February 24, 2026	Viña del Mar	Chile	Viña del Mar Festival	"Tank", "O.O", "Dash", "Ponte Lokita" (featuring Kidd Voodoo), "Tic Tic" (featuring Pabllo Vittar), "Rico", "Soñar" (Spanish version), "Phoenix", "Run for Roses", "High Horse", "Spinnin' on It", "Papillon", "Dice", "Love Me Like This", "Blue Valentine"	

== Accolades ==
=== Awards and nominations ===
Name of the award ceremony, year presented, award category, nominee(s) of the award, and the result of the nomination
Award ceremony	Year	Category	Nominee(s)/work(s)	Result	Ref.
Asia Artist Awards	2022	Best Emotive Award – Music	Nmixx	Won	
Asia Artist Awards	2022	New Wave Award – Music	Nmixx	Won	
Asia Artist Awards	2022	DCM Popularity Award – Female Singer	Nmixx	Nominated	
Asia Artist Awards	2022	Idolplus Popularity Award – Music	Nmixx	Nominated	
Asia Artist Awards	2023	Popularity Award – Singer (Female)	Nmixx	Nominated	
Asia Artist Awards	2023	Best Icon Award – Music	Nmixx	Won	
Asia Artist Awards	2023	Best Choice Award – Music	Nmixx	Won	
Circle Chart Music Awards	2023	Album of the Year – 1st Quarter	Ad Mare	Nominated	
Circle Chart Music Awards	2023	New Artist of the Year – Digital	"O.O"	Nominated	
Circle Chart Music Awards	2023	New Artist of the Year – Physical	Entwurf	Nominated	
Circle Chart Music Awards	2023	Song of the Year – February	"O.O"	Nominated	
D Awards	2026	Best Group	Nmixx	Won	
The Fact Music Awards	2023	Artist of the Year (Bonsang)	Nmixx	Won	
The Fact Music Awards	2025	Artist of the Year (Bonsang)	Nmixx	Won	
The Fact Music Awards	2026	Artist of the Year (Bonsang)	Nmixx	Won	
The Fact Music Awards	2026	Sound of the Year (Daesang)	Nmixx	Won	
Hanteo Music Awards	2024	Global Outstanding Artist	Nmixx	Won	
Genie Music Awards	2022	Best Female Rookie Award	Nmixx	Nominated	
Golden Disc Awards	2023	Rookie Artist of the Year	Nmixx	Nominated	
Korean Music Awards	2026	Musician of the Year (Daesang)	Nmixx	Nominated	
Korean Music Awards	2026	Best K-pop Album	Blue Valentine	Nominated	
Korean Music Awards	2026	Best K-pop Album	Fe3O4: Forward	Nominated	
Korean Music Awards	2026	Song of the Year (Daesang)	"Blue Valentine"	Nominated	
Korean Music Awards	2026	Best K-pop Song	"Blue Valentine"	Nominated	
MAMA Awards	2022	Favorite New Artist	Nmixx	Won	
MAMA Awards	2022	Artist of the Year (Daesang)	Nmixx	Longlisted	
MAMA Awards	2022	Best New Female Artist	Nmixx	Nominated	
MAMA Awards	2022	Worldwide Fans' Choice Top 10	Nmixx	Nominated	
MAMA Awards	2023	Worldwide Fans' Choice Top 10	Nmixx	Nominated	
Melon Music Awards	2022	Best New Artist	Nmixx	Nominated	
Melon Music Awards	2023	Top 10 Artist	Nmixx	Nominated	
Melon Music Awards	2024	Top 10 Artist	Nmixx	Nominated	
Seoul Music Awards	2025	Main Prize (Bonsang)	Nmixx	Nominated	
Seoul Music Awards	2025	Popularity Award	Nmixx	Nominated	
Seoul Music Awards	2025	K-Wave Special Award	Nmixx	Nominated	
Seoul Music Awards	2025	K-pop World Choice – Group	Nmixx	Nominated	
TMELive International Music Awards	2026	Global Top Trend Song Top 10	"Blue Valentine"	Won	
TMELive International Music Awards	2026	The Leading International Group	Nmixx	Won	

=== Listicles ===
Key
‡	Indicates a sole placement listicle

Name of publisher, year listed, name of listicle, and placement
Publisher	Year	Listicle	Placement	Ref.
Forbes Asia	2026	30 Under 30	Placed	
IZM	2025	‡ Artist of the Year	Placed	

=== State and cultural honors ===
Name of country, year given, and name of honor
Country	Year	Honor or Award	Ref.
South Korea (Note: Honors are given at the Korean Popular Culture and Arts Awards, arranged by the Korea Creative Content Agency and hosted by the Ministry of Culture, Sports and Tourism. They are awarded to those who have contributed to the arts and South Korea's pop culture.)	2026	Minister of Culture, Sports and Tourism Commendation	
