= Lily (singer, born 2002) =

Australian and South Korean singer (born 2002)

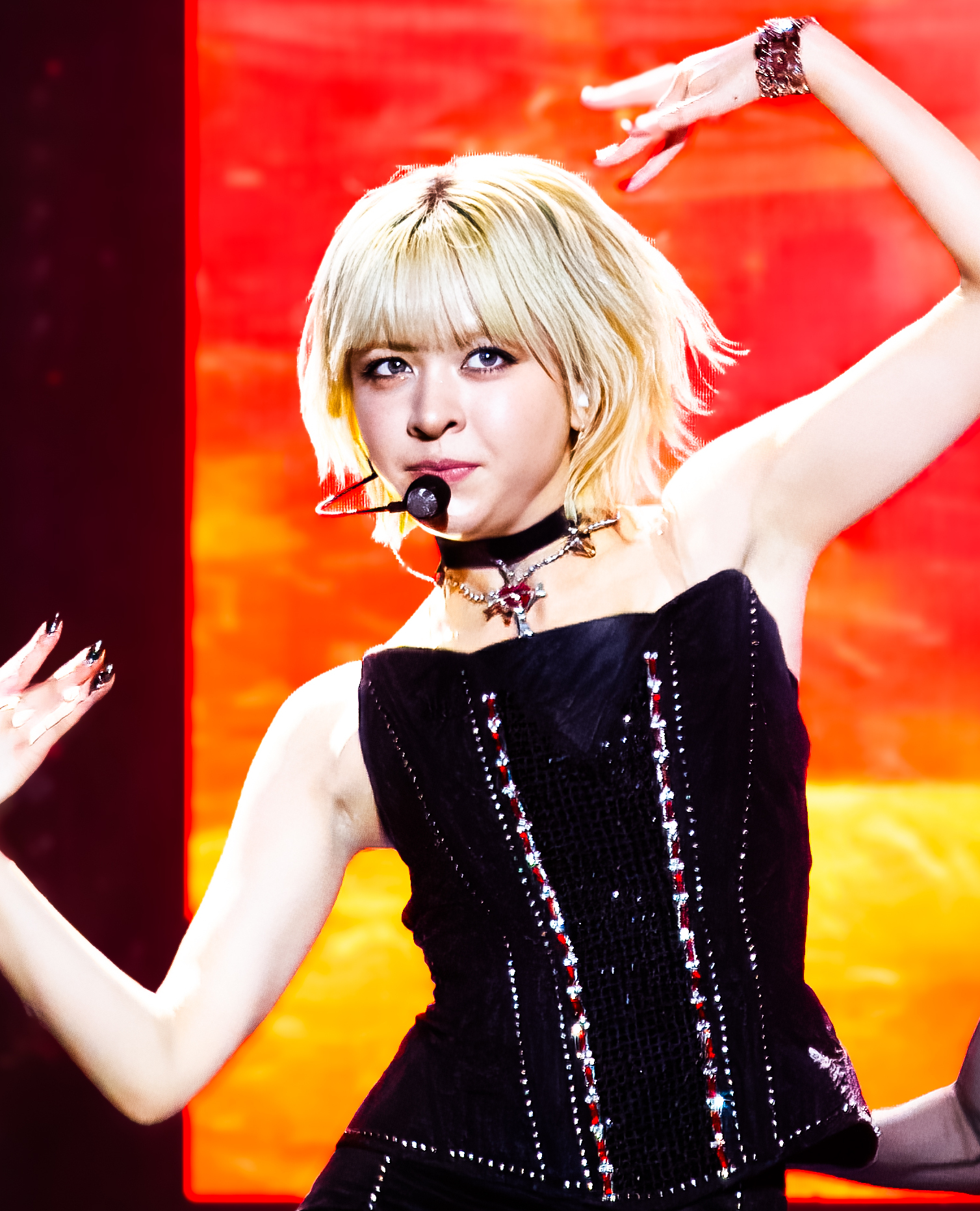
- Lily in April 2026
- Born: Lily Jin Park Morrow; 17 October 2002 (age 24); Marysville, Victoria, Australia
- Other name: Park Jin
- Citizenship: South Korea; Australia
- Occupation: Singer
- Years active: 2014–present
- Musical career
- Instrument: Vocals
- Labels: JYP; Republic
- Member of: Nmixx

Korean name
- Hangul: 박진
- RR: Bak Jin
- MR: Pak Chin

Lily Jin Park Morrow (born 17 October 2002), known mononymously as Lily (Korean: 릴리), is an Australian and South Korean singer. She is best known as a vocalist of South Korean girl group Nmixx under JYP Entertainment. She began her career by competing on the South Korean reality show competition series K-pop Star 4 in November 2014, where she placed fourth.

== Early life and education ==
Lily Jin Park Morrow, Korean name Park Jin (박진), was born on 17 October 2002 in Marysville, Victoria, Australia to a South Korean mother and an Australian father. She has a younger sister named Amy, and is of British descent through her paternal grandparents. When she was six years old, her family lost their house in the Black Saturday bushfires, and she took up singing as a way to work through the trauma. Lily attended Daylesford Primary School, Alexandra Secondary College, Cheongdam Middle School and Dunchon High School. She completed her secondary education in March 2022.

== Career ==
=== 2014–2015: Career beginnings ===
In November 2014, Lily auditioned for SBS K-Pop Star Season 4. She placed fourth place overall. On 14 May 2015, JYP Entertainment confirmed Lily signed an exclusive contract with the label. In 2015, Lily contributed the song "I'm Afraid" to the soundtrack of the KBS' drama Orange Marmalade and was released on May 16.

In 2016, she starred in The Weatherman's Umbrella, a film shot in Marysville and produced by her father, where she plays a young girl Sarah who goes on a journey of self-discovery.

=== 2022–present: Debut with Nmixx ===
On 22 February 2022, Lily debuted with the girl group Nmixx with the single "O.O". The group followed up with the single "Dice" later that year. In November 2022, Lily participated in King of Mask Singer where she was eliminated in the second round.

In August 2024, Lily was announced as the host for Issue Club, a web show where she takes on the role of an investigative reporter and interviews artists.

== Artistry ==
=== Vocals ===
Lily has said that Taylor Swift inspired her to become a singer. Writing for Prestige Online Singapore, Surabhi Redkar praised Lily's breath control and "vast" vocal range. On the South Korean music talk show The Seasons, host Zico likened her pitch accuracy to a "machine's" after she covered "Cruel Summer" by Swift.

=== Songwriting ===
In Teen Vogue, Crystal Bell noted that Lily incorporated music terminology in the lyrics for "Crescendo" by Nmixx, while her contributions to another song of the group's, "Loud", included a reference to the Greek myth of Tantalus. Lily describes herself as a "music nerd" that enjoys leaving literary references in her lyrics.

== Personal life ==
An avid reader, Lily regularly hosts Lily's Lost the Plot, a live-streamed book discussion club where she discusses a book or film with her viewers. According to Lily, the idea for the series came from the BookTube videos she watched growing up.

== Discography ==
=== Singles ===
List of singles, showing year released, and name of the album
Title	Year	Album
"Find It"	2014	Non-album singles
"Out of This World"	2014	Non-album singles
"Trampoline"	2014	Non-album singles

=== Soundtrack appearances ===
List of soundtrack appearances, showing year released, selected chart positions, and name of the album
Title	Year	Peak chart positions	Album
Title	Year	KOR	Album
"I'm Afraid" (겁이 나)	2015	—	Orange Marmalade OST
"Shiny Day" (눈부신 날)	2015	—	Orange Marmalade OST
"The Weather Man"	2016	—	The Weatherman's Umbrella OST
"The Moment" (너를 만난 순간) (with Sullyoon)	2023	— (Note: "The Moment" did not enter the Circle Digital Chart, but peaked at number 170 on the Download Chart.)	Love to Hate You OST
"Ridin'" (with Jiwoo and Kyujin)	2025	152	World of Street Woman Fighter OST, Volume 2
"—" denotes releases that did not chart or were not released in that region.

=== Songwriting credits ===
All song credits are adapted from the Korea Music Copyright Association's database unless stated otherwise.

Year	Artist	Song	Album	Note	Ref
2014	Herself	"Trampoline"	Non-album single	As a lyricist	
2025	Nmixx	"Reality Hurts"	Blue Valentine	As a lyricist	—N/a
2025	Nmixx	"Blue Valentine" (English version)	Non-album single	As a lyricist	
2026	Nmixx (featuring Pabllo Vittar)	"Tic Tic"	Non-album single	As a lyricist	—N/a
2026	Nmixx	"Crescendo"	Heavy Serenade	As a lyricist	—N/a
2026	Nmixx	"Loud"	Heavy Serenade	As a lyricist	—N/a
2026	Nmixx and Anderson .Paak	"Caution"	K-Pops! (Music from and inspired by K-Pops! Motion Picture)	As a lyricist and composer	
2026	Herself and Haewon	"Sing to the Moon" (너는 달)	Strange Muse	As a lyricist	

== Filmography ==
=== Film ===
Year	Film	Role	Ref.
2016	The Weatherman's Umbrella	Sarah	

=== Television shows ===
Year	Title	Role	Notes	Ref.
2014–2015	K-pop Star 4	Contestant	Finished in 4th place	
2022	King of Mask Singer	Contestant	Ep. 380–381	

=== Web shows ===
Year	Title	Role	Ref.
2024	Issue Club	Host	
