= O.O (song) =

Single by Nmixx

from the album Ad Mare
- Language: Korean
- Released: February 22, 2022
- Genre: Baile funk; teen pop; pop rock
- Length: 2:52
- Label: JYP
- Composers: Brian U (The Hub); Enan (The Hub); MarkAlong (The Hub); Charlotte Wilson (The Hub); Chanti (The Hub); Ejae; Awry (The Hub); Ayushy (The Hub); Jan Baars (The Hub); Rajan Muse (The Hub)
- Lyricist: Dr.JO (153/Joombas)

Nmixx singles chronology
"O.O" (2022)	"Dice" (2022)

Music video
- "O.O" on YouTube

"O.O" is a song recorded by South Korean girl group Nmixx for their debut single album Ad Mare. It was released as the lead single by JYP Entertainment on February 22, 2022.

== Background and release ==
On July 9, 2021, JYP Entertainment announced it would be debuting a new girl group in February 2022, the first since Itzy in 2019. On February 2, 2022, it was announced that the group would debut on February 22 with the release of Ad Mare. Six days later, the track listing was released with "O.O" announced as the lead single. On February 17, the first music video teaser was released. Two days later, the highlight medley video teaser was released. On February 21, the second music video teaser was released. The song alongside the music video was released on February 22.

On October 7 and 8, 2023, Nmixx held their first fan concert, Nmixx Change Up: Mixx University, where the song was split into two separate tracks — "O.O Part 1" and "O.O Part 2".

On February 22, 2025, to celebrate their third debut anniversary, Nmixx released a newly recorded version of "O.O Part 2" on their YouTube channel as part of the video "Nmixx 3rd Anniversary Live Clip (Band ver.)". Compared to the version performed at the fan concert, this new version includes a live band accompaniment. The two parts of the song, titled "Baila" and "Superhero", were included on Nmixx's first studio album Blue Valentine released on October 13.

== Composition ==
"O.O" was written by Dr.JO (153/Joombas), composed by Ejae along with Brian U, Enan, MarkAlong, Charlotte Wilson, Chanti, Awry, Ayushy, Jan Baars, and Rajan Muse from The Hub, and arranged by the former three. was described as a song with "mixture of baile funk, teen pop, and pop rock" genres with "intense captivating trap intro". The A section of "O.O" was composed in the key of E minor, with a tempo of 133 beats per minute, and the B section was composed in A major with a tempo of 100 beats per minute.

== Critical reception ==
Upon its release, "O.O" received mostly negative reviews from music critics. Tanu I. Raj from NME described the song as "a rollercoaster ride of genres [from] electropop to pop rock to hip hop" and compared the song to Aespa's "Next Level" and Girls' Generation's "I Got a Boy". She stated that "'O.O' comes off as a weak facsimile in the face of the complexity" compared to aforementioned songs as "'O.O' tries, but fails, to capture any attention for very long." Korea JoongAng Daily noted that "Because of its disjointed nature, many criticize that the song tries to push for an edgy and provocative image but is difficult to follow as it lacks a basic musical structure." Pop music and media studies professor Lee Gyu-tag wrote although it had similar musical styles as "Next Level", it "was much more melodious and had smoother transitions" than "O.O", as well as pointing out that following the song was difficult because of the lack of a clear standout melody. Korean Music Awards selection committee member Jung Min-jae said that "I don't think 'O.O' would be seeing [negative] reactions if the song was catchy, no matter how convoluted." Overall, she felt that it was not a safe choice as a debut song for the group.

In a more favorable review, on the other hand, Divyansha Dongre of Rolling Stone India described "'O.O' as a quintessential K-pop track [which] meshes multiple genres into one". Divyansha noted that "the switching between soundscapes may get slightly overwhelming for some listeners [due to the song] opening [which] is a powerful mix of trap and bass-synth [while] its second verse sees the soundscape quickly adopt the vibrancy and zest that pop rock has to offer". Overall, Divyansha stated that "[the song] serves as a fair introduction to the caliber and talent Nmixx members have to offer".

== Commercial performance ==
"O.O" debuted at number 147 on South Korea's Gaon Digital Chart in the chart issue dated February 27 – March 5, 2022, ascending to number 81 in the chart issue dated March 20–26, 2022. On the Billboard K-pop Hot 100, the song debuted at number 88 in the chart issue dated March 19, 2022, ascending to number 63 in the chart issue dated April 30, 2022.

On the Billboard Japan Hot 100, the song debuted at number 86 in the chart issue dated March 2, 2022, ascending to number 42 in the chart issue dated March 23, 2022. On the Billboard Vietnam Hot 100, the song debuted at number 95 in the chart issue dated March 3, 2022, ascending to number 38 in the following week. In Singapore, the song debuted at number 27 on the RIAS Top Streaming Chart and number eight on the RIAS Top Regional Chart in the chart issue dated February 25 – March 3, 2022, ascending to number 16 on the RIAS Top Streaming Chart and number four on the RIAS Top Regional Chart in the following week. The song also debuted 18 on the Billboard Singapore Songs in the chart issue dated March 19, 2022. In Malaysia, the song debuted at number 14 on the RIM Top 20 Most Streamed International and Domestic Songs in the chart issue dated March 4–10, 2022. The song also debuted at number 17 on the Billboard Malaysia Songs in the chart issue dated March 19, 2022. In Indonesia, the song debuted at number 25 on the Billboard Indonesia Songs in the chart issue dated April 2, 2022.

Globally, the song debuted at number 162 on the Billboard Global 200 in the chart issue dated March 19, 2022, ascending to number 138 in the following week. The song also debuted at number 109 on the Billboard Global Excl. U.S. in the chart issue dated March 12, 2022, ascending to number 71 in the chart issue dated March 26, 2022.

== Promotion ==
On February 18, 2022, JYP Entertainment announced that the group debut showcase would be postponed after member Bae was diagnosed with COVID-19, the debut showcase was held on March 1. The group subsequently performed on four music programs: Mnet's M Countdown on March 3, KBS's Music Bank on March 4, MBC's Show! Music Core on March 5, and SBS's Inkigayo on March 6.

== Credits and personnel ==
Credits adapted from Melon.

Studio

- JYPE Studios – recording, vocal editing
- Canton House Studios – mixing
- Sterling Sound – mastering

Personnel

- Nmixx – vocals, background vocals
- Frankie Day – background vocals
- Ayushy – background vocals
- Dr.JO (153/Joombas) – lyrics
- Brian U (The Hub) – composition, arrangement, drums, synths
- Enan (The Hub) – composition, arrangement, drums, synths
- MarkAlong (The Hub) – composition, arrangement, drums, synths
- Charlotte Wilson (The Hub) – composition, vocal directing
- Chanti (The Hub) – composition
- Ejae – composition, background vocals, vocal directing
- Awry (The Hub) – composition, background vocals
- Ayushy (The Hub) – composition
- Jan Baars (The Hub) – composition
- Rajan Muse (The Hub) – composition
- Brian U (The Hub) – vocal directing
- Enan (The Hub) – vocal directing
- Gun Hye-jin – recording
- Lee Sang-yeob – vocal editing
- Jiyoung Shin NYC – vocal editing
- Jaycen Joshua – mixing
- Jacob Richards – mixing (assistant)
- Mike Seaberg – mixing (assistant)
- DJ Riggins – mixing (assistant)
- Chris Gehringer – mastering
- Jade – bass
- BananaGaraG – bass
- Paper Planet – guitar
- TRIAD – guitar

== Charts ==
=== Weekly charts ===
Weekly chart performance for "O.O"
Chart (2022)	Peak position
Global 200 (Billboard)	138
Indonesia (Billboard)	25
Japan (Japan Hot 100)	42
Japan Streaming (Oricon)	35
Malaysia (Billboard)	17
Malaysia (RIM)	14
Singapore (Billboard)	18
Singapore (RIAS)	16
South Korea (Gaon)	81
South Korea (K-pop Hot 100)	63
Vietnam (Vietnam Hot 100)	38

=== Monthly charts ===
Monthly chart performance for "O.O"
Chart (2022)	Position
South Korea (Gaon)	92

== Release history ==
Region	Date	Format	Version	Label
Various	February 22, 2022	Digital download; streaming	Original	JYP; Dreamus
Various	October 13, 2025	Digital download; streaming	Part 1 (Baila)	JYP; Republic
Various	October 13, 2025	Digital download; streaming	Part 2 (Superhero)	JYP; Republic
