= Ryan S. Jhun =

South Korean songwriter and producer

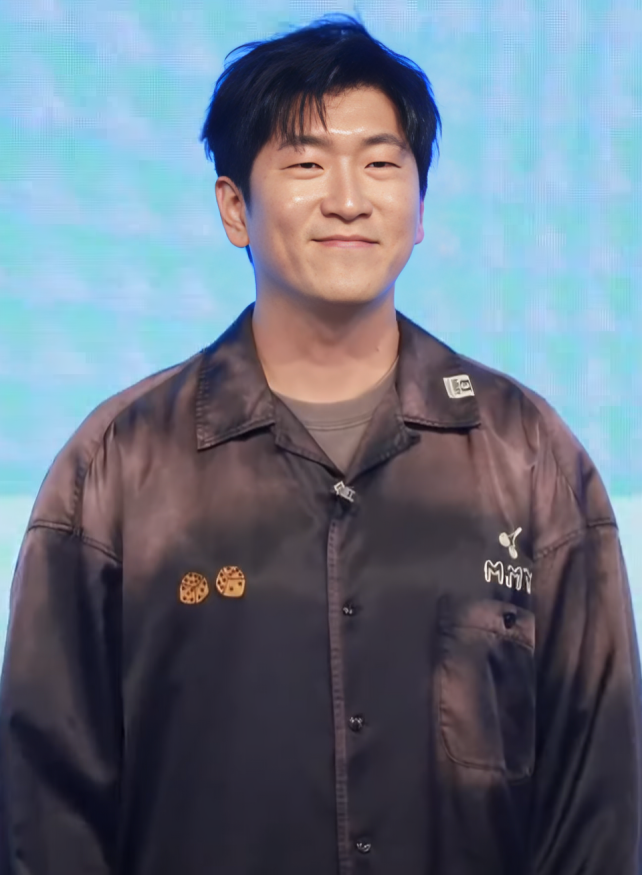
- Jhun in October 2024

Background information
- Born: Jhun Se-won (전세원); February 28, 1979 (age 47); Jinju, South Korea
- Genre: K-pop
- Occupations: Record producer; songwriter
- Years active: 2010–present
- Labels: Marcan Entertainment; Ateam Entertainment
- Website: marcanent.com

Ryan S. Jhun (Korean: 라이언 전) is a South Korean songwriter and record producer. Jhun is known for his work with various K-pop soloists and idol groups, getting his start through acts from SM Entertainment such as Shinee, Super Junior, f(x), Taeyeon, Exo, NCT, and TVXQ. He has since produced for several artists from other labels like IU, Loona, Lee Hyo-ri, U-KISS, Girl's Day, Twice, NMIXX, Oh My Girl, Monsta X, Ive, BAE173, and Cravity, as well as songs for audition programs Produce 101 and My Teenage Girl.

He founded and became chief executive officer of music production and publishing company Marcan Entertainment. He is also the CEO of Ateam Entertainment, where he produced for the label's groups VAV and BugAboo.

== Background and career ==
Jhun was born in South Korea on February 28, 1979. He moved to New York at ten years old, where he began being interested in music. He auditioned for SM Entertainment for what would eventually become boy band Shinhwa, however he was discouraged by his parents. He later traveled back to South Korea to submit his demos, with only SM accepting his music. His first released song was "Chitty Chitty Bang Bang" for Lee Hyori's album H-Logic (2010), while his first "hands-on" song was "Lucifer" for Shinee for their album of the same name.

Jhun is also CEO of Ateam Entertainment, having joined in 2017 to produce for their boy group VAV. In 2021, he debuted his first girl group, BugAboo, under Ateam. Jhun was awarded Best Songwriter at the 2023 Melon Music Awards.

== Musical style ==
Jhun is known for his "crossover" musical style, with his production incorporating elements from world music. He also co-founded songwriting and production teams Marcan Entertainment and Musikade, and regularly collaborates with Denzil Remedios, LDN Noise, and Dem Jointz.

== Discography ==
=== As lead artist ===
Year	Artist(s)	Title	Album	Ref.
2021	NCT U (Doyoung & Haechan)	"Maniac"	Maxis by Ryan Jhun Pt. 1	
2021	Loona (HeeJin, Kim Lip, JinSoul, & Yves)	"Not Friends"	Maxis by Ryan Jhun Pt. 2	

=== Production credits ===
All song credits are adapted from the Korea Music Copyright Association's database unless stated otherwise.

==== 2010s ====
2010s

Year	Artist(s)	Title	Album
2010	Shinee	"Lucifer"	Lucifer
2010	Shinee	"Get It"	Hello
2010	Girl's Day	"Nothing Lasts Forever"	Everyday
2010	Lee Hyo-ri	"Chitty Chitty Bang Bang"	H-Logic
2010	Lee Hyo-ri	"Scandal"	H-Logic
2010	Lee Hyo-ri	"Want Me Back"	H-Logic
2010	Lee Hyo-ri	"100Percent"	H-Logic
2010	Super Junior	"Shake It Up"	Bonamana
2010	Super Junior	"No Other"	Bonamana
Chungrim	"First Class"	Non-album single	
2011	Super Junior	"Walkin"	Mr. Simple
2011	Super Junior	"My Love, My Kiss, My Heart"	Mr. Simple
2011	U-Kiss	"TOP THAT"	Neverland
2011	U-Kiss	"Neverland"	Neverland
2011	U-Kiss	"Baby Don't Cry"	Neverland
2011	U-Kiss	"Someday"	Neverland
2011	f(x)	"My Style"	Pinocchio
2011	f(x)	"Lollipop"	Pinocchio
2011	TVXQ	"B.U.T. (Be-Au-Ty)"	B.U.T (Be-Au-Ty) / Back to Tomorrow
2011	Baek Ji-young	"Bad Girl"	Pitta
2012	U-Kiss	"Tick Tock"	DoraDora
2012	U-Kiss	"Amazing"	DoraDora
2012	U-Kiss	"Stop Girl"	Stop Girl
2012	Spica	"Anger"	Russian Roulette
2012	Spica	"Up N Down"	Russian Roulette
2012	Spica	"No More"	Russian Roulette
2012	Spica	"Pain Killer"	Painkiller
2012	Supernova	"Saturday"	Go For It!
2012	B1A4	"In the Air"	In the Wind
2013	Exo	"Peter Pan"	XOXO
2013	15&	"Somebody"	Sugar
2013	Shinee	"Excuse Me Miss"	Why So Serious? – The Misconceptions of Me
2014	Exo	"December, 2014 (The Winter's Tale)"	Exology Chapter 1: The Lost Planet
2014	NU'EST	"Storybook"	Re:Birth
2014	TVXQ	"B.U.T. (Be-Au-Ty) (Korean Version)"	Live World Tour: Catch Me in Seoul
2014	J-Min	"Secret Letter"	Shine
2015	Super Junior-D&E	"Breaking Up"	The Beat Goes On
2015	Shinee	"View"	Odd
2015	Shinee	"Married to the Music"	Married to the Music
2015	Girls' Generation	"You Think"	Lion Heart
2015	Taeyeon & Verbal Jint	"I"	I
2015	f(x)	"Deja Vu"	4 Walls
2015	f(x)	"X"	4 Walls
2015	f(x)	"Diamond"	4 Walls
2015	Red Velvet	"Dumb Dumb"	The Red
2015	Red Velvet	"Campfire"	The Red
2015	Red Velvet	"Red Dress"	The Red
2015	Red Velvet	"Don't U Wait No More"	The Red
2015	Melody Day	"#LoveMe"	#LoveMe
2015	Exo	"Love Me Right"	Love Me Right
2015	TVXQ	"Champagne"	Rise as God
2016	Taemin	"One By One"	Press It
2016	Taemin	"Mystery Lovers"	Press It
2016	Taemin	"Sexuality"	Press It
2016	Hyomin	"Sketch"	Sketch
2016	Hyomin	"Gold"	Sketch
2016	Hyomin	"Road Trip"	Sketch
2016	Boys Republic	"Get Down"	BR: Evolution
2016	Pinkrush	"Fingertips"	35 Girls 5 Concepts
2016	I.O.I	"Crush"	Chrysalis
2016	I.O.I	"Whatta Man (Good Man)"	Non-album singles
2016	Fiestar	"Apple Pie"	Non-album singles
2016	Fei	"Fantasy"	Fantasy
2016	Exo	"Cloud 9"	Ex'Act
2016	Kangta	"Calling Out For You"	'Home' Chapter 1
2017	VAV	"Venus (Dance With Me)"	Spotlight
2017	VAV	"ABC (Middle of the Night)"	Spotlight
2017	NCT Dream	"My First and Last"	The First
2017	Melody Day	"Kiss on the Lips"	Kiss on the Lips
2017	Produce 101 (season 2)	"It's Me (Pick Me)"	Non-album single
2017	Produce 101 (season 2)	"Super Hot"	Produce 101 – Final
2017	Girl's Day	"I'll Be Yours"	Girl's Day Everyday 5
2017	Girl's Day	"Thirsty"	Girl's Day Everyday 5
2017	Minah (Girl's Day)	"Truth"	Girl's Day Everyday 5
2017	Sojin (Girl's Day)	"Kumbaya (Come By Here)"	Girl's Day Everyday 5
2017	Shannon	"Hello"	Hello
2017	Exo	"Touch It"	The War
2017	RAINZ	"Juliette"	Sunshine
2018	NCT U	"Baby Don't Stop"	NCT 2018 Empathy
2018	VAV	"Spotlight"	Spotlight
2018	VAV	"Gorgeous"	Spotlight
2018	Idol Producer	"Ei Ei"	Idol Producer OST
2018	Idol Producer	"Dream"	Idol Producer OST
2018	GFRIEND	"Love Bug"	Time for the Moon Night
2018	AOA	"파르페"	Bingle Bangle
2018	Taeyeon	"Something New"	Something New
2018	UNB	"BLACK HEART"	Black Heart
2018	NEX7	"Wait a Minute"	The First
2018	NEX7	"Let Me be Your Fire"	The First II
2018	NEX7	"Heart Full of You"	The First II
2018	NEX7	"Dream World Tour"	The First II
2019	Monsta X	"Stealer"	Take.2 We Are Here
2019	VAV	"Thrilla Killa"	Thrilla Killa
2019	1THE9	"Spotlight"	XIX
2019	Oh My Girl	"Checkmate"	The Fifth Season
2019	Yesung	"Pink Magic"	Pink Magic
2019	Red Velvet	"LP"	The ReVe Festival: Day 1
2019	Red Velvet	"Love Is the Way"	The ReVe Festival: Day 2
2019	Twice	"Strawberry"	Fancy You
2019	Twice	"Get Loud"	Feel Special
2019	NCT Dream	"Boom"	We Boom
2019	Victon	"New World"	Nostalgia
2019	Kang Daniel	"Touchin"	Cyan
2019	Exo	"Obsession"	Obsession
2019	Exo	"Ya Ya Ya"	Obsession
2019	UHSN	"Popsicle"	Non-album single

==== 2020s ====
2020

Artist(s)	Title	Album
Iz*One	"Eyes"	Bloom*Iz
NCT 127	"Kick It"	Neo Zone
NCT 127	"Punch"	Neo Zone
Victon	"Nightmare"	Continuous
Victon	"Mayday"	Non-album single
Oh My Girl	"Dolphin"	Nonstop
SuperM	"100"	Super One
NU'EST	"Moon Dance"	The Nocturne
WayV	"After Midnight"	Awaken the World
WayV	"Electric Hearts"	Awaken the World
VAV	"Made For Two"	Made For Two
HA:TFELT	"La Luna"	Non-album single
Taemin	"Just Me and You"	Never Gonna Dance Again
YooA	"Bon Voyage"	Bon Voyage
YooA	"Far"	Bon Voyage
YooA	"Abracadabra"	Bon Voyage
Verivery	"My Face"	Face Us
Lee Haein	"Santa Lullaby (We Used To Sing)"	Non-album single

2021

Artist(s)	Title	Album
Victon	"What I Said"	Voice: The Future Is Now
Victon	"Chess"	Voice: The Future Is Now
Kang Seung-sik (Victon)	"Carry On"	Voice: The Future Is Now
Jang Han-byul	"Used to This"	Non-album singles
Youha	"Abittipsy"	Non-album singles
Cravity	"My Turn"	Season 3. Hideout: Be Our Voice
Cravity	"Mammoth"	Season 3. Hideout: Be Our Voice
Cravity	"Bad Habits"	Season 3. Hideout: Be Our Voice
IU	"Celebrity"	Lilac
IU	"Flu"	Lilac
Shinee	"Don't Call Me"	Don't Call Me
Shinee	"I Really Want You"	Don't Call Me
WayV	"Kick Back"	Kick Back
Weeekly	"After School"	We Play
Mirae	"We Are Future"	Killa
Mirae	"Killa"	Killa
Yesung	"Phantom Pain"	Beautiful Night
Oh My Girl	"Dun Dun Dance"	Dear OhMyGirl
Oh My Girl	"Dear You"	Dear OhMyGirl
Oh My Girl	"My Doll"	Dear OhMyGirl
Oh My Girl	"Quest"	Dear OhMyGirl
Oh My Girl	"Who Comes Who Knows"	Dear OhMyGirl
Oh My Girl	"Swan"	Dear OhMyGirl
Taemin	"Strings"	Advice
Taemin	"Sad Kids"	Advice
WJSN the Black	"Easy"	My Attitude
GWSN	"Like it Hot"	The Other Side of the Moon
Loona	"&"	[&]
Loona	"PTT (Paint the Town)"	[&]
Loona	"Wow"	[&]
Loona	"Be Honest"	[&]
Moon Jong-up	"Us"	Us
The Boyz	"B.O.Y (Bet on You)"	Thrill-ing
WayV (Ten & Yangyang)	"Low Low"	Phantom
BtoB	"Outsider"	4U: Outside
Fromis 9	"Talk & Talk"	Non-album single
NCT 127	"Sticker"	Sticker
NCT 127	"Focus"	Sticker
NCT 127	"The Rainy Night"	Sticker
Loona	"Hula Hoop"	Hula Hoop
My Teenage Girl	"Same Same Different"	Non-album single
BugAboo	"BugAboo"	BugAboo
BugAboo	"All Night Play"	BugAboo
Kai	"Peaches"	Peaches
Ive	"Eleven"	Eleven
NCT U	"Universe (Let's Play Ball)"	Universe
Luna	"I'll Be Your Night"	Non-album single
SM Town (Taeyong, Jeno, Hendery, Yangyang & Giselle)	"Zoo"	2021 Winter SM Town: SMCU Express

2022

Artist(s)	Title	Album
Got the Beat	"Step Back"	Non-album single
Taeyeon	"Can't Control Myself"	INVU
Luminous	"Matryoshka"	Between Light and Darkness (Self n Ego)
Luminous	"Want It More?"	Between Light and Darkness (Self n Ego)
Pentagon	"Feelin' Like"	In:vite U
Jamie	"Pity Party"	Non-album single
Viviz	"Fiesta"	Beam of Prism
Viviz	"Love You Like"	Beam of Prism
Apink	"My oh My"	Horn
Taeyeon	"Heart"	INVU
Taeyeon	"You Better Not"	INVU
Nmixx	"Tank"	Ad Mare
Kihyun	"Voyager"	Voyager
TVXQ	"Like Snow-White"	Epitaph
NCT Dream	"Better Than Gold"	Glitch Mode
Oh My Girl	"Real Love"	Real Love
Oh My Girl	"Eden"	Real Love
Oh My Girl	"Replay"	Real Love
Oh My Girl	"Parachute"	Real Love
Oh My Girl	"Kiss & Fix"	Real Love
Oh My Girl	"Blink"	Real Love
Oh My Girl	"Dear Rose"	Real Love
BAE173	"Jaws"	Intersection: Blaze
Monsta X	"Breathe"	Shape of Love
Minseo	"Self Trip"	mOS 2.74
Ryeowook	"Bluebird"	A Wild Rose
CLASS:y	"Up"	Class Is Over
CLASS:y	"Shut Down"	Class Is Over
CLASS:y	"Tell Me One More Time"	Class Is Over
CLASS:y	"Super Cool"	Class Is Over
CLASS:y	"Feelin' So Good"	Class Is Over
Cha Eun-woo (Astro)	"First Love"	Drive to the Starry Road
Victon	"Stupid O'Clock"	Chaos
Luminous	"Wish You Were Here"	Non-album single
BugAboo	"Easy Move"	Pop
The Boyz	"Seweet"	Non-album single
Aespa	"Girls"	Girls
Aespa	"ICU"	Girls
Chungha	"Crazy Like You"	Bare & Rare
Super Junior	"Mango"	The Road: Keep On Going
Apink ChoBom	"Feel Something"	Copycat
Ailee	"Kiss Me Happy"	Listen-Up EP.1
The Boyz	"Bump & Love"	Be Aware
Luminous	"Marionette"	Luminous in Wonderland
Luminous	"Your Ocean"	Luminous in Wonderland
Luminous	"Crazy"	Luminous in Wonderland
Luminous	"Far"	Luminous in Wonderland
Luminous	"Hologram	Luminous in Wonderland
Luminous	"Talking Myself"	Luminous in Wonderland
Luminous	"Legend"	Luminous in Wonderland
Ren	"Loco (9:00 pm)"	Listen-Up EP.4
Ive	"After Like"	After Like
Ive	"My Satisfaction"	After Like
Ha Sung-woon	"Focus"	Strange World
Ha Sung-woon	"Say Yes"	Strange World
Ha Sung-woon	"Too little too late (Duet with Jamie)"	Strange World
Rocket Punch	"Thanks To (Listen-Up)"	Listen-Up EP.5
Key	"Burn"	Gasoline
Key	"I Can't Sleep"	Gasoline
Billlie	"Mcguffins ~ Who's the Joker?"	The Billage of Perception: Chapter Two
Monsta X	"If with You"	Non-album single
Kangta	"Eyes On You"	Eyes on You
NCT 127	"Designer"	2 Baddies
Kang Seung-sik, Lim Se-jun & Jung Su-bin	"Sunny (U.S.A)"	Listen-Up EP.8
Yubin (Oh My Girl)	"Sleepover (The &)"	Listen-Up EP.9
Seulgi	"Bad Boy, Sad Girl"	28 Reasons
Jamie	"In My Bag"	One Bad Night
Chaeyeon	"Hush Rush"	Hush Rush
Chaeyeon	"Danny"	Hush Rush
Chaeyeon	"Aquamarine"	Hush Rush
Chaeyeon	"Same But Different"	Hush Rush
Kihyun	"Youth"	Youth
CLASS:y	"Tick Tick Boom"	Day & Night
CLASS:y	"Zealous"	Day & Night
Exy	"Birthday Party"	<Second World> Final
YooA	"Selfish"	Selfish
YooA	"Lay Low"	Selfish
YooA	"Blood Moon"	Selfish
YooA	"Melody"	Selfish

2023

Artist(s)	Title	Album
Monsta X	"Beautiful Liar"	Reason
Monsta X	"Daydream"	Reason
Chogakusei	"Give It To Me"	Cho
Hwang Min-hyun	"Hidden Side"	Truth or Lie
Cravity	"Baddie"	Master: Piece
Cravity	"A to Z"	Master: Piece
Yeeun	"Strange Way to Love"	The Beginning
Yeeun	"Cherry Coke"	The Beginning
Sevenus	"Doesn't Matter"	Peak Time – 3 Round <Originals Match>
Apink	"Withcha"	Self
Ive	"Kitsch"	I've Ive
Ive	"I Am"	I've Ive
Ive	"Lips"	I've Ive
Ive	"Heroine"	I've Ive
Ive	"Mine"	I've Ive
Ive	"Not Your Girl"	I've Ive
Ive	"Next Page"	I've Ive
Ive	"Cherish"	I've Ive
Ive	"Shine with Me"	I've Ive
Vanner	"Prime Time"	Peak Time – <Final Round>
Ive	"Wave"	Wave
Ive	"Classic"	Wave
PICK-CAT	"SNAP"	Queendom Puzzle Team Battle 1
Athena	"SNAP"	Queendom Puzzle Team Battle 2
Chae Soo-bin & Jo Yu-ri	"Yellow Circle"	Non-album single
xooos	"Bad At Us"	Made In Heart
xooos	"Lavender"	Made In Heart
Fromis 9	"#menow"	Unlock My World
Ren	"Ready to Move"	Ren'dezvous
Ren	"Autofill"	Ren'dezvous
Ren	"Imagine More"	Ren'dezvous
Ren	"Lullaby (11:03)"	Ren'dezvous
Ren	"My Story"	Ren'dezvous
Shinee	"Like It"	Hard
Ive	"I Want"	Non-album single
Nana (Wooah), Sangah (Lightsum), Suyun (Rocket Punch), Yeeun, Wooyeon (Wooah) & Kei (Lovelyz)	"Bad Blood"	Queendom Puzzle All-Rounder Battle 2
Oh My Girl	"Summer Comes"	Golden Hourglass
Shownu X Hyungwon	"Play Me"	The Unseen
Shownu X Hyungwon	"Slow Dance"	The Unseen
Infinite	"New Emotions"	13egin
Nana (Wooah), Bora (Cherry Bullet), Yeonhee (Rocket Punch), Zoa (Weeekly), Juri (Rocket Punch), Jiwoo (TripleS) & Jihan (Weeekly)	"I Do"	Queendom Puzzle Semi Final
Vanner	"Diamonds"	Veni Vidi Vici
Cignature	"Mess With My Mind"	Us in the Summer
Cignature	"Smooth Sailing"	Us in the Summer
Cignature	"Sorry So Sorry"	Us in the Summer
Weeekly	"Good Day (Special Daileee)"	Non-album single
El7z Up	"Die For You"	7+Up
El7z Up	"Cloud 9"	7+Up
D.O.	"I Do"	Expectation
D.O.	"Lost"	Expectation
82Major	"Sure Thing"	On
Just B	"Medusa"	÷ (Nanugi)
Wheein	"Dance 4 You"	IN the Mood
Ive	"Either Way"	I've Mine
Ive	"Off the Record"	I've Mine
Ive	"Baddie"	I've Mine
Ive	"Holy Moly"	I've Mine
Ive	"OTT"	I've Mine
Ive	"Payback"	I've Mine
Vanner	"Ponytail"	"Performer" (Japanese ver.)
Weeekly	"Backwards"	ColoRise
Weeekly	"Sweet Dream"	ColoRise
Viviz	"Untie"	Versus
Enhypen	"Orange Flower (You Complete Me)"	Orange Blood
iii	"Forbidden Midnight"	Non-album single
Fantasy Boys	"Potential"	Potential
Fantasy Boys	"Potential" (English ver.)	Potential
Xoos	"Crush"	Non-album single
One Top	"Say Yes"	JS Ent.

2024

Artist(s)	Title	Album
JD1	"Who Am I"	Non-album single
Nmixx	"Boom"	Fe3O4: Break
Sistar19	"No More (Ma Boy)"	Non-album singles
H1-Key	"Thinkin' About You"	Non-album singles
CIX	"Lovers or Enemies"	0 or 1
Weeekly	"Stranger"	Non-album single
Vanner	"Ponytail" (Korean ver.)	Capture the Flag
Vanner	"After Party"	Capture the Flag
Cravity	"Worst Thriller"	Evershine
Cravity	"Love Or Die"	Evershine
Cravity	"Cherry Blossom"	Evershine
Cravity	"C'est La Vie"	Evershine
Cravity	"Mr."	Evershine
Lun8	"Super Power"	Buff
YooA	"Shooting Star"	Borderline
YooA	"Love Myself"	Borderline
Purple Kiss	"BBB"	BXX
Wooah	"Blush"	Non-album single
Kim Woo-jin	"I Like the Way"	I Like the Way
Ive	"Heya" (해야)	Ive Switch
Ive	"Accendio"	Ive Switch
Ive	"Blue Heart"	Ive Switch
Ive	"Ice Queen"	Ive Switch
Ive	"Wow"	Ive Switch
Ive	"Reset"	Ive Switch
Dxmon	"Girls, Love Boys, Love Girls"	Hyperspace 911
Dxmon	"Vitamin You"	Hyperspace 911
Cignature	"Poongdung"	Sweetie But Saltie
Wooah	"Pom Pom Pom"	Unframed
Chuu	"Strawberry Rush"	Strawberry Rush
Chuu	"Daydreamer"	Strawberry Rush
Ive	"Summer Festa"	Non-album single
Weeekly	"Classic"	Bliss
Unis	"Curious"	Curious
Unis	"Datin' Myself"	Curious
Taemin	"Sexy in the Air"	Eternal
Taemin	"The Unknown Sea"	Eternal
Taemin	"Crush"	Eternal
Taemin	"Deja Vu"	Eternal
Taemin	"Say Less"	Eternal
Nmixx	"Sickuhh"	Fe3O4: Stick Out
Nmixx	"Red Light Sign, But We Go"	Fe3O4: Stick Out
Nmixx	"Love Is Lonely"	Fe3O4: Stick Out
Oh My Girl	"Start Up"	Dreamy Resonance
Oh My Girl	"Love Me Like You Do"	Dreamy Resonance
Loossemble	"Fanaticism"	TTYL
Loossemble	"TTYL"	TTYL
Loossemble	"Cotton Candy (Confessions)"	TTYL
Loossemble	"Confessions (Cotton Candy)"	TTYL
Loossemble	"Hocus Pocus"	TTYL
Loossemble	"Secret Diary"	TTYL
Whib	"Rush of Joy"	Rush of Joy
Itzy	"Gold"	Gold
Itzy	"Imaginary Friend"	Gold
Dxmon	"Zip Zip Zip"	Youth Never Die
Dxmon	"Heart Balloon"	Youth Never Die
Minho	"Something About U"	Call Back
Minho	"Round Kick"	Call Back
CLASS:y	"Psycho and Beautiful"	Love XX
CLASS:y	"Love Game"	Love XX

2025

Artist(s)	Title	Album
Ive	"Rebel Heart"	Ive Empathy
Ive	"Flu"	Ive Empathy
Ive	"You Wanna Cry"	Ive Empathy
Ive	"Thank U"	Ive Empathy
Ive	"Attitude"	Ive Empathy
Ive	"TKO"	Ive Empathy
Zerobaseone	"Step Back"	Blue Paradise
Yeji	"258"	Air
Nmixx	"Golden Recipe"	Fe3O4: Forward
KiiiKiii	"I Do Me"	Uncut Gem
KiiiKiii	"Debut Song"	Uncut Gem
KiiiKiii	"Groundwork"	Uncut Gem
KiiiKiii	"There They Go"	Uncut Gem
KiiiKiii	"BTG"	Uncut Gem
Chuu	"Only Cry in the Rain"	Only Cry in the Rain
Chuu	"Back in Town"	Only Cry in the Rain
Chuu	"Kiss a Kitty"	Only Cry in the Rain
Chuu	"Je T'aime"	Only Cry in the Rain
Chuu	"No More"	Only Cry in the Rain
HITGS	"Sourpatch"	Things We Love : H
HITGS	"Never Be Me"	Things We Love : H
E'Last	"Crazy Train"	Versus
E'Last	"Gotham"	Versus
Itzy	"Girls Will Be Girls"	Girls Will Be Girls
VVUP	"Giddy Boy"	Non-album single
WayV	"Ice Tea"	Big Bands
Key	"Picture Frame"	Hunter
Key	"Lavender Love"	Hunter
Kep1er	"Ice Tea"	Bubble Gum
iii	"Guilty"	Re:al iii
Monsta X	"N the Front"	The X
Aespa	"Rich Man"	Rich Man
Pow	"Wall Flower"	Non-album single
HITGS	"Happy"	Things We Love : I
HITGS	"A-Ha!"	Things We Love : I
TWS	"Caffeine Rush"	Play Hard
Nmixx	"Podium"	Blue Valentine
A20 May	"Sweat"	Paparazzi Arrive
Itzy	"Tunnel Vision"	Tunnel Vision
VVUP	"House Party"	Vvon
VVUP	"Super Model"	Vvon
VVUP	"Invested In You"	Vvon

2026

Artist(s)	Title	Album
Naze	"Isn't She Lovely?"	Non-album single
P1Harmony	"Pandemonium"	Unique
P1Harmony	"L.O.Y.L."	Unique
Baby Dont Cry	"Bittersweet"	After Cry
Baby Dont Cry	"Shapeshifter"	After Cry
Baby Dont Cry	"Tears on My Pillow"	After Cry
Naze	"People Talk"	Naze
Aespa	"WDA (Whole Different Animal)"	Lemonade
Nmixx	"Loud"	Heavy Serenade
Uspeer	"Wicked Game"	Bite District
Uspeer	"So Fine"	Bite District
Uspeer	"Bestie"	Bite District
Uspeer	"Loud"	Bite District
NCT 127	"Piñata"	Blingy
TNX	"Die Another Day"	Non-album single
Minho	"Love Me Now"	Make It Hot
Minho	"Time 1.1"	Make It Hot
Nmixx (Lily & Haewon)	"Sing to the Moon"	Strange Muse
Nmixx (Jiwoo & Kyujin)	"Whip"	Strange Muse

== Filmography ==
=== Television show ===
Year	Title	Role	Ref.
2023	Peak Time	Judge	
2024	Project 7	Director	

== Awards and nominations ==
Name of the award ceremony, year presented, category, nominee of the award, and the result of the nomination
Award ceremony	Year	Category	Nominee / Work	Result	Ref.
Circle Chart Music Awards	2021	Composer of the Year	Ryan S. Jhun	Won	
Circle Chart Music Awards	2022	Composer of the Year	Ryan S. Jhun	Won	
KBS Entertainment Awards	2022	Best Couple Award	Listen-Up (with Kim Seung-soo)	Won	
Melon Music Awards	2023	Best Songwriter Award	Ryan S. Jhun	Won	
