= Minseo (singer, born 2004) =

South Korean singer and dancer (born 2004)

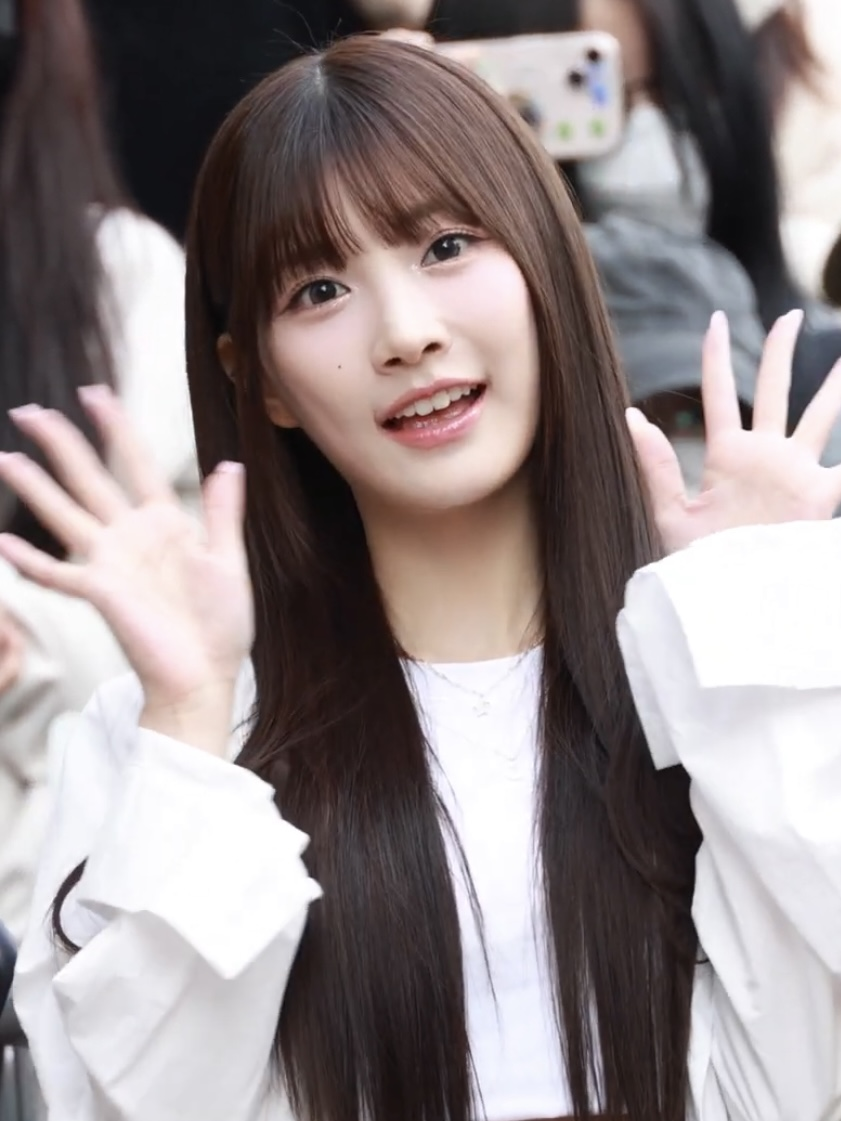
- Minseo in 2024
- Born: Kim Min-seo; August 12, 2004 (age 22); South Korea
- Occupations: Singer; dancer
- Musical career
- Genre: K-pop
- Instrument: Vocals
- Years active: 2020–present
- Label: H Music
- Member of: Wooah

Korean name
- Hangul: 김민서
- RR: Gim Minseo
- MR: Kim Minsŏ

Kim Min-seo (Korean: 김민서; born August 12, 2004), better known mononymously as Minseo, is a South Korean singer and dancer. She is a member of the South Korean girl group Wooah, formed by H Music Entertainment in 2020.

== Early life ==
Minseo was born on August 12, 2004. Minseo attended school alongside group member Lucy. Following a recommendation from Lucy, who was already a trainee at H Music Entertainment (then known as NV Entertainment), Minseo auditioned and subsequently joined the agency.

== Career ==
=== 2020–present: Debut with Wooah and solo debut ===
Minseo debuted as a member of Wooah, on May 13, 2020. The group released their debut single album, Exclamation, with "woo!ah!" serving as the album's lead single.

On August 28, 2022, Minseo released "Make u Move" alongside Wooyeon, for the original soundtrack of television series Becoming Witch. On September 20, 2023, Minseo was announced to appear as a special host on Show Champion. On December 29, she released "Walk In The Moonlight" for the original soundtrack of web series Snap and Spark.

On April 14, 2026, it was announced that H Music had paired up with Iron ENM to release a three-part music project series for Wooah, Dxmon, and HITGS, through this project Minseo made her solo debut with the digital single WXW (Wish With W): Vol.1 with "Endlessly You" serving as the lead single.

== Artistry ==
=== Influences ===
Minseo has cited IU, BTS, and American singer-songwriter Ariana Grande as the reasons she decided to become a K-pop idol after training for two years.

== Other ventures ==
=== Fashion and endorsements ===
On October 8, 2021, Minseo, alongside group members Nana and Wooyeon, walked the runway at the 2022 Spring/Summer Seoul Fashion Week at Deoksugung Palace representing the brand HolyNumber7, this marked her first public appearance at a fashion show event. On March 31, 2022, Minseo and Nana made their physical runway debut for the CEEANN·CBCL Fall/Winter 2022 Collection, representing the brands.

== Discography ==
=== Singles ===
List of singles as lead artist, showing year released, selected chart positions and album name
| Title | Year | Peak chart positions | Album |
| Title | Year | KOR BGM | Album |
|---|---|---|---|
| "Endlessly You" (하염없이 너만) (Note: Released as part of the digital single WXW (Wish With W): Vol.1.) | 2026 | 198 | Non-album single |
"—" denotes a recording that did not chart or was not released in that region.

=== Soundtrack appearances ===
List of soundtrack appearances, showing year released, selected chart positions and album name
| Title | Year | Peak chart positions | Album |
| Title | Year | KOR BGM | Album |
|---|---|---|---|
| "Make U Move" (With Wooyeon) (Note: Credited under woo!ah! but the track is only sung by Minseo and Wooyeon.) | 2022 | — | Becoming Witch OST |
| "Walk In The Moonlight" | 2023 | 109 | Snap and Spark OST |
"—" denotes a recording that did not chart or was not released in that region.

=== Songwriting credits ===
All song credits are adapted from the Korea Music Copyright Association's database unless stated otherwise.

List of songs, showing year released, artist name, and name of the album
| Title | Year | Artist | Album | Lyricist | Composer | Ref. |
|---|---|---|---|---|---|---|
| "WXW (Wish With W)" (Note: Released as part of the digital single WXW (Wish With W): Vol.2.) | 2026 | Wooah | Non-album single | Yes | No | |

== Filmography ==
=== Television shows ===
| Year | Title | Role | Notes | Ref. |
|---|---|---|---|---|
| 2022 | Scholarship Quiz | Contestant | "Find the Teenage Star Brain" Special | |
| 2022 | AVA Dream | Cast member | | |
| 2025 | A-Idol | Contestant | Finished 25th individually (Note: As a group Wooah finished in 6th place.) | |

=== Hosting ===
| Year | Title | Role | Ref. |
|---|---|---|---|
| 2023 | Show Champion | Special MC | |

== Videography ==
=== Music videos ===
List of music videos, showing year released, and directors
| Title | Year | Director(s) | Ref. |
|---|---|---|---|
| "Endlessly You" | 2026 | Unknown | |
| "Endlessly You" (Handwriting Version) | 2026 | Unknown | |

=== Music video appearances ===
| Year | Title | Artist | Length | Ref. |
|---|---|---|---|---|
| 2022 | "Couple" | Nana | 3:38 | |
