= Blush (Wooah song) =

Single by Wooah

from the EP Unframed
- Language: Korean
- Released: April 8, 2024
- Length: 2:58
- Label: SSQ; Genie Music
- Composers: Ryan S. Jhun; Sebastian Bliem; Elias Grauss; Kristine Bogan; Kristin Marie
- Lyricists: Kim Da-sol; Jessica Oh; Ujinlee; Hyang Ah-huh; Camel Park
- Producers: Ryan S. Jhun; Sebastian Bliem; Elias Grauss

Wooah singles chronology
| "Rollercoaster" (2022) | "Blush" (2024) | "Pom Pom Pom" (2024) |

Music video
- "Blush" on YouTube

"Blush" (stylized in all caps) is a song recorded by South Korean girl group Wooah for their second extended play, Unframed. It was released as a pre-release single by SSQ Entertainment on April 8, 2024. The song was composed and arranged by Ryan S. Jhun.

== Background and release ==
Following the release of the single album Pit-a-Pat in November 2022, the group entered a 17-month hiatus from group musical releases; the longest since their debut in 2020. During this period, members Nana and Wooyeon participated in the Mnet reality competition series Queendom Puzzle (2023), where Nana ultimately placed second and joined the project group El7z Up.

On April 1, 2024, SSQ Entertainment announced that the group had officially rebranded their name from "woo!ah!" to "Wooah" to signal a "new stage" in their career. Following the announcement, "Blush" was revealed as the group's first release under the new name and the comeback scheduler was announced on April 2, 2024. The song was released digitally on April 8, 2024, along with its accompanying music video. It was later included as the fourth track on the group's second extended play, Unframed, which was later released on June 17, 2024.

== Composition ==
"Blush" is a dance-pop and synth-pop track with a duration of two minutes and fifty-eight seconds. The song is composed in the key of D major with a tempo of 134 beats per minute. Produced by Ryan S. Jhun, the track's production is characterized by a "minimalist" and "bouncy" beat that incorporates elements of Jersey club and 2-step garage.

== Critical reception ==
Professional ratings
Review scores
| Source | Rating |
|---|---|
| IZM | 3/5 stars |

"Blush" received mostly positive reviews from music critics, who highlighted its production and atmosphere. Writing for NME, Tamar Herman included the track in the publication's list of the best K-pop songs released in the first half of 2024. Herman described the song as a "fizzy, minimalistic springtime refresher". She also noted the song's instrumental and "dreamy" production successfully evoked a "cheek-warming, fluttering feeling."

Lim Dong-yeop, writing for IZM criticized the song for lacking "distinctive personality", but praised it for its appeal to the general public and, the second half of the song briefly invoking Wooah's familiar image.

== Music video and promotion ==
The music video for was released on April 8, 2024, in conjunction with the single's digital release. The video features a "high-teen" and "dreamy" aesthetic, depicting the five members in vibrant, light blue, pink, red, and white colored settings such as a garden, a retro-style diner, and a stylized bedroom.

"Blush" was promoted at many South Korean music shows such as, Inkigayo, Music Bank, and M Countdown. Wooah also performed an intro in addition to a remixed version of "Blush" for the summer 2024 SBS Gayo Daejeon.

== Commercial performance ==
In South Korea, "Blush" debuted and peaked at number 36 on the Circle Download Chart for the week ending April 13, 2024. Internationally, the song reached number one on the iTunes Top Albums chart in Chile following its release.

== Credits and personnel ==
Credits adapted from Naver Vibe.

Personnel

- Wooah – vocals, background vocals
- Ryan S. Jhun – composer, producer
- Sebastian Bliem - composer, producer
- Elias Grauss - composer, producer
- Kim "DASUTC" Da-sol (MUMW) – lyricist
- Jessica Oh (CLEF) – lyricist
- Ujinlee - lyricist
- Hyang Ah-huh (MUMW) - lyricist
- Camel Park (MUMW) - lyricist
- Kristine Bogan – composer
- Kristin Marie - composer

== Accolades ==
=== Listicles ===
Name of publisher, year listed, name of listicle, and placement
| Publisher | Year | Listicle | Placement | Ref. |
|---|---|---|---|---|
| NME | 2024 | The 15 best K-pop songs of 2024 – so far | Placed | |

== Charts ==
=== Weekly charts ===
Weekly chart performance for "Blush"
| Chart (2024) | Peak position |
|---|---|
| South Korea (Circle Download Chart) | 36 |

=== Monthly charts ===
Monthly chart performance for "Blush"
| Chart (2024) | Peak position |
|---|---|
| South Korea (Circle Download Chart) | 142 |

== Release history ==
Release history for "Blush"
| Region | Date | Format | Label |
|---|---|---|---|
| Various | April 8, 2024 | Digital download; streaming | SSQ; Genie Music |
