= Woo-yeon =

- Hangul: 우연
- RR: Uyeon
- MR: Uyŏn

Woo-yeon (Korean: 우연) is a Korean given name. As of 2026, the name ranked 1,075th out of 36,179 male names and 1,014th out of 28,726 female names. A total of 484 people, consisting of 282 males and 202 females, were born with the name from 2008 to 2026.

Notable people with the name include:

Given name

- Ahn Woo-yeon, birth name Ahn Byeong-ho, South Korean actor
- Sim Woo-yeon, South Korean football player

Stage name

- Park Jin-kyung, stage name Wooyeon, South Korean actress and singer. Member of South Korean girl group Wooah
- Ryu Hyo-young, known by the stage name Jung Woo-yeon, South Korean actress, model, and rapper

Fictional characters include:

- Song Woo-yeon, portrayed by Park Ji-hu, female protagonist of Spirit Fingers (TV series)

== See also ==
- List of Korean given names
