= HITGS =

South Korean girl group

- Also known as: Project H 2025 (2024–2025)
- Origin: Seoul, South Korea
- Genre: K-pop
- Years active: 2025–present
- Label: H Music Entertainment
- Members: VV; Seojin; Seohee; Hyerin; Iyoo

HITGS (Korean: 힛지스; RR: Hitjiseu; stylized in all caps), formerly known as Project H 2025 (프로젝트 H 2025), is a South Korean girl group under H Music Entertainment. The group consists of five members: VV, Seojin, Seohee, Hyerin, and Iyoo. The group debuted on April 28, 2025, with the single album Things We Love: H.

== Name ==
The group's name, HITGS, is an acronym for "Hip, Innocent, Teenager, Girls, Story".

== History ==
=== 2024: Pre-debut ===
Seojin was a trainee at S2 Entertainment and was originally planned to debut with Kiss Of Life. On December 10, 2024, Hyerin was chosen to attend the pop-up store opening of South Korean makeup brand Tirtir in Seongsu-dong, Seoul, alongside Wooah's Nana and Wooyeon. On February 2, 2025, Hitgs (then known as Project H 2025) attended the Ulkin fashion show at The 2025 Fall/Winter Seoul Fashion Week held at the Dongdaemun Design Plaza in Jung-gu, Seoul.

=== 2025–present: Debut with Things we love : H, and Things we love : I ===
On March 31, Project H 2025's X (formerly Twitter) account revealed a motion logo for the group and revealed their name to be "HITGS". HITGS is H Music's first new girl group since the debut of Wooah in 2020.

The next day on April 1, H Music announced that HITGS would debut with the single album Things We Love: H. On April 28, HITGS made their debut with the lead single "Sourpatch". On May 26, H Music revealed that HITGS would be coming back with the digital single "Gross" on June 2. On July 1, it was announced that HITGS would be coming back with their second digital single "Charizzma". "Charizzma" was released on July 7. On September 22, HITGS released the music video for "A-ha!". On September 30, it was announced HITGS would release their first extended play Things we love : I which contained pre-release singles "Gross", "Charizzma" and, "A-ha!" as part of the EP's tracklist. On October 6, Things we love : I was released with "Happy" serving as the lead single. On December 26, HITGS was one of the featured acts at the 2025 SBS Gayo Daejeon.

On April 14, 2026, it was announced that H Music had paired up with Iron ENM to release a three-part music project series for Wooah, Dxmon, and HITGS, with HITGS being planned to release a digital single on April 15 titled Things We Dream: Vol.1 with "Cherry Blossom" serving as the lead single.

== Endorsements ==
Shortly after their debut in April 2025, HITGS were selected to be the brand ambassadors of fashion and beauty brands MediPeel, Betty Boop, Tirtir and L'Officiel.

== Members ==
- VV (维维) (비비) - vocalist
- Seojin (서진) - leader, rapper, dancer
- Seohee (서희) - vocalist, dancer
- Hyerin (혜린) - vocalist
- Iyoo (이유) - vocalist, rapper, dancer

== Discography ==
=== Extended plays ===
List of extended plays, with selected details, and chart positions
Title	Details	Peak chart positions	Sales
Title	Details	KOR	Sales
Things We Love: I	Released: October 6, 2025; Label: H Music Entertainment; Formats: Digital download, streaming; Track listing: 1. "Happy"; 2. "A-ha!"; 3. "Page"; 4. "Gross"; 5. "Charizzma" (카리즈마)	9	KOR: 5,673

=== Single albums ===
List of single albums, with selected details, and chart positions
Title	Details	Peak chart positions	Sales
Title	Details	KOR	Sales
Things We Love: H	Released: April 28, 2025; Label: H Music Entertainment; Formats: CD, digital download, streaming; Track listing: 1. "Sourpatch" (사워패치); 2. "Never Be Me" (네버비미)	9	KOR: 45,663

=== Singles ===
List of singles, showing year released, selected chart positions, and album name
Title	Year	Peak chart positions	Album
Title	Year	KOR Down.	Album
"Sourpatch" (사워패치)	2025	112	Things We Love: H
"Gross"	2025	78	Things We Love: I
"Charizzma" (카리즈마)	2025	102	Things We Love: I
"Happy"	2025	81	Things We Love: I
"Cherry Blossom" (Note: Released as part of the digital single Things We Dream: Vol.1.)	2026	160	Non-album singles
"Little By Little" (Note: Released as part of the digital single Things We Dream: Vol.2.)	2026	—	Non-album singles
"Gulliver!" (Note: Released as part of the digital single Things We Dream: Vol.3.)	2026	170	Non-album singles
"BRB" (Note: Released as part of the digital single Things We Dream: Vol.4.)	2026	178	Non-album singles
"—" denotes releases that did not chart or were not released in that region.

=== Other charted songs ===
List of other charted songs, showing year released, selected chart positions, and album name
Title	Year	Peak chart positions	Album
Title	Year	KOR Down.	Album
"Never Be Me" (네버비미)	2025	195	Things We Love: H

== Videography ==
=== Music videos ===
Year	Title	Album	Ref.
2025	"Sourpatch"	Things We Love : H	
2025	"Gross"	Things We Love : I	
2025	"Charizzma"	Things We Love : I	
2025	"A-ha!"	Things We Love : I	
2025	"Happy"	Things We Love : I	
2026	"Cherry Blossom"	Things We Dream: Vol.1	
2026	"Little By Little"	Things We Dream: Vol.2	
2026	"Gulliver!"	Things We Dream: Vol.3	

== Accolades ==
=== Awards and nominations ===
Name of the award ceremony, year presented, award category, nominee(s) of the award, and the result of the nomination
Award ceremony	Year	Category	Nominee(s)/work(s)	Result	Ref.
D Awards	2026	Best Rising Star (Girl)	HITGS	Nominated	
Hanteo Music Awards	2026	Rookie of the Year	HITGS	Nominated	
Korean Music Awards	2026	Best Popular Female Group Award	HITGS	Nominated	
Korean Music Awards	2026	Global Rising Star Award	HITGS	Nominated	
