= Dance by the Light of the Moon =

Dance by the Light of the Moon may refer to:

- "Dance by the Light of the Moon" (song), a 1960 doo-wop song by The Olympics
- "Dance by the Light of the Moon", a 1992 episode of Canadian drama series Forever Knight

== See also ==
- By the Light of the Moon (disambiguation)
