= By the Light of the Moon =

By the Light of the Moon may refer to:

- By the Light of the Moon (novel), 2002 novel by Dean Koontz
- By the Light of the Moon (album), 1987 album by Los Lobos
- By the Light of the Moon (film), 1911 film by Edwin S. Porter
- "By the Light of the Moon" (The Vampire Diaries), an episode of the TV series The Vampire Diaries

== See also ==
- By the Light of the Silvery Moon (disambiguation)
- Under the Moonlight (disambiguation)
- Love by the Light of the Moon, 1901 film by Edwin S. Porter
