= Under the Moonlight =

Under the Moonlight may refer to:

== Music ==
- Under the Moonlight, an album by Ghost, 2002
- Under the Moonlight, an album by Timeless Miracle, unreleased
- Under the Moonlight, an EP by VAV, 2015
- "Under the Moonlight", a song by Dennis Wilson from Pacific Ocean Blue, 2008 reissue
- "Under the Moonlight", a song by Donna De Lory from Songs 95, 2002
- "Under the Moonlight", a song by Travis from The Boy with No Name, 2007
- "Under the Moonlight", a song by DJ Layla & Sianna, 2021

== Other uses ==
- Under the Moonlight (2001 film), a film by Reza Mirkarimi
- Under the Moonlight (2023 film), a documentary film by Tonny Trimarsanto
- After War Gundam X: Under the Moonlight, a 2004–2006 manga sequel to the Japanese anime series After War Gundam X

== See also ==
- Under the Moon, a 1990s UK sports show
- By the Light of the Moon (disambiguation)
