= Rollercoaster (Woo!ah! song) =

Single by Woo!ah!

from the album Pit-a-Pat
- Language: Korean
- Released: November 16, 2022
- Length: 3:14
- Label: NV; Kakao Entertainment
- Composers: Lee Woo-min "collapsedone"; David Anthony Eames
- Lyricist: MRCH
- Producers: Lee Woo-min "collapsedone"; David Anthony Eames

Woo!ah! singles chronology
"Danger" (2022)	"Rollercoaster" (2022)	"Blush" (2024)

Music video
- "Rollercoaster" on YouTube

"Rollercoaster" is a song recorded by South Korean girl group Woo!ah! for their fourth single album Pit-a-Pat. It was released as the lead single by NV Entertainment on November 16, 2022.

== Background and release ==
On November 6, 2022, NV Entertainment announced Woo!ah! would be releasing their fourth single album Pit-a-Pat. One day later, on November 7, 2022, the tracklist was revealed where it was confirmed "Rollercoaster" would be the lead single of the album. On November 14, 2022, the music video teaser was revealed. On November 16, 2022, "Rollercoaster", alongside its music video, was released as Pit-a-Pat's lead single.

Following this single, Woo!ah! proceeded to take a 17-month hiatus from group musical releases.

== Composition ==
"Rollercoaster" is a dance-pop and synth-pop track characterized by its "funky" bassline and bright, energetic synths, and the lyrics themselves are about the message of wanting to confess one's feelings to someone using the thrill and excitement of a roller coaster as an example. The song has a duration of 3 minutes and 14 seconds and is composed in the key of F# major with a tempo of 116 beats per minute.

== Critical reception ==
Jeong Su-min, writing for IZM, gave "Rollercoaster" a positive review, noting that Woo!ah! took a different strategy by embracing the "bright and lovely" traditional girl group style. Jeong also highlighted the collaboration with composer Lee Woo-min "collapsedone" known for his work with Twice and Fromis 9, stating that the song's "bursting pleasure" in the chorus and its "seamless, tight sound" offered a "comfortable familiarity".

== Music video and promotion ==
The music video, directed by, Kim Jeong-seong, features a bright, "high-teen" aesthetic, utilizing neon colors, retro, and vaporwave-inspired backgrounds. The members are shown in various stylized settings. The members also perform synchronized choreography that mimics the movement of a roller coaster.

"Rollercoaster" was promoted at various South Korean music shows such as, Show Champion, Music Bank, and, Show! Music Core among other music shows.

== Commercial performance ==
In South Korea, "Rollercoaster" debuted and peaked at number 65 on the Circle Download Chart for the weekly issue November 13 to November 19, 2022. It also debuted and peaked at number 162 on the Circle BGM Chart of the same week.

== Credits and personnel ==
Credits adapted from MelOn.

Personnel

- Wooah – vocals, background vocals
- Lee Woo-min "collapsedone" – composer, arranger
- David Anthony Eames – composer
- MRCH – lyricist

== Charts ==
=== Weekly charts ===
Weekly chart performance for "Rollercoaster"
Chart (2022)	Peak position
South Korea (Circle BGM Chart)	162
South Korea (Circle Download Chart)	65

=== Monthly charts ===
Monthly chart performance for "Rollercoaster"
Chart (2022)	Peak position
South Korea (Circle Download Chart)	166

== Release history ==
Release history for "Rollercoaster"
Region	Date	Format	Label
Various	November 16, 2022	Digital download; streaming	NV; Kakao Entertainment
