= Unframed (EP) =

- Digital cover

EP by Wooah
- Released: June 17, 2024
- Genres: K-pop; Punk rock
- Length: 19:22
- Language: Korean
- Labels: SSQ; Genie Music

Wooah chronology
Pit-a-Pat (2022)	Unframed (2024)

Singles from Unframed
- 1. "Blush" Released: April 8, 2024; 2. "Pom Pom Pom" Released: June 17, 2024

Unframed is the second Korean-language extended play (EP) by South Korean girl group Wooah. It was released by SSQ Entertainment on June 17, 2024, and contains six tracks, including the pre-release single "Blush" and the lead single "Pom Pom Pom".

== Background and release ==
Following a 17 month hiatus, Wooah released the digital single "Blush" on April 8, 2024. On May 24, 2024, SSQ Entertainment announced the group would release their second extended play, Unframed. On June 4, 2024 the comeback scheduler released, and nine days later on the 13th the concept photos were released. On June 17, 2024, Unframed was officially released alongside "Pom Pom Pom"'s music video. The EP served as their first physical release in 19 months, following the single album Pit-a-Pat in November 2022. It also marked the group's first multi-track project after officially rebranding from "woo!ah!" to "Wooah".

== Promotion ==
Following the release of Unframed, ten days later, on June 27, 2024, SSQ announced Wooah would hold their second fan-concert series "Wooah-Land" after four years had passed since their last in 2020. On November 18, 2024, Wooah officially concluded the "Wooah-Land" fan concerts.

== Track listing ==
Track listing for Unframed
No.	Title	Lyrics	Music	Arrangement	Length
1.	"I'll Tell You" (내가 다 해보고 말해줄게)	Donna	Donna; CuzD	CuzD	2:49
2.	"Polaroid"	Seora	Kyeong Juhyeong; Anna Timgren; Laura Amos	Kyeong Juhyeong	3:27
3.	"Pom Pom Pom"	Ryan S. Jhun; Seoran; ZNEE; Barry Cohen; Lenno Linjama; Gavin Jones; Anna Timgren; Justin Reinstein	Jhun; Anna Timgren; Hanif Hitmanic Sabzevari; Barry Cohen; ZNEE; Lenno Linjama; Gavin Jones; Anna Timgren; Justin Reinstein	Jhun; PCDC; Gingerbread; Lenno Linjama; Hanif Hitmanic Sabzevari	3:25
4.	"Blush"	Jhun; ZNEE; Kim Da-sol (MUMW); Hyang Ah-huh (MUMW); Camel Park (MUMW); Ujinlee; Oh Yu-won	Jhun; Sebastian Bliem; Elias Grauss; Kristine Bogan; Kristine Marie Skolem	Jhun; Sebastian Bliem; Elias Grauss; David Wilson	2:58
5.	"Girls Love Boys" (소녀... 소년을 만나다)	Jhun; Ben Samama; Oscar Bell; Twiky Kaya; Choi Saeri	Jhun; Ben Samama; Oscar Bell; Twiky Kaya	Jhun; Ben Samama; Oscar Bell; Samuel Ledet	3:17
6.	"Pom Pom Pom (EDM version)"	Jhun; Seoran; ZNEE; Barry Cohen; Lenno Linjama; Gavin Jones; Anna Timgren; Justin Reinstein	Jhun; Anna Timgren; Hanif Hitmanic Sabzevari; Barry Cohen; ZNEE; Lenno Linjama; Gavin Jones; Anna Timgren; Justin Reinstein	Jhun; PCDC; Gingerbread; Lenno Linjama; Hanif Hitmanic Sabzevari	3:26
Total length:					19:22

== Charts ==
=== Weekly charts ===
Weekly chart performance for Unframed
Chart (2024)	Peak position
South Korean Albums (Circle)	13

=== Monthly charts ===
Monthly chart performance for Unframed
Chart (2024)	Peak position
South Korean Albums (Circle)	43

== Sales ==
Sales for Unframed
Region	Certification	Certified units/sales
South Korea	—	33,622

== Release history ==
Release history for Unframed
Region	Date	Format	Label
South Korea	June 17, 2024	CD	SSQ; Genie
Various	June 17, 2024	Digital download; streaming	SSQ; Genie
