= By the Light of the Silvery Moon =

By the Light of the Silvery Moon may refer to:

- "By the Light of the Silvery Moon" (song), a 1909 popular song
- By the Light of the Silvery Moon (film), a 1953 musical film starring Doris Day
  - By the Light of the Silvery Moon (album), the 1953 soundtrack album for the film

== See also ==
- By the Light of the Moon (disambiguation)
