= Joy (Woo!ah! EP) =

- Digital and Enjoy version cover

EP by Woo!ah!
- Released: June 9, 2022
- Genres: K-pop; dance-pop; synth-pop
- Length: 20:05
- Language: Korean
- Labels: NV; Kakao

Woo!ah! chronology
Wish (2021)	Joy (2022)	Pit-a-Pat (2022)

Singles from Joy
- 1. "Catch the Stars" Released: January 4, 2022; 2. "Danger" Released: June 9, 2022

Joy is the first Korean-language extended play (EP) by South Korean girl group Woo!ah!. It was released by NV Entertainment on June 9, 2022, and contains six tracks, including the pre-release single "Catch the Stars" and the lead single "Danger".

== Background and release ==
On January 4, 2022, Woo!ah! released "Catch the Stars" (별 따러 가자), as the group's first digital single. On May 20, 2022, NV Entertainment announced Woo!ah! would be releasing their first extended play in June 2022 with a poster reveal. On May 24, 2022, the comeback scheduler was released. On May 30, 2022, the group concept photos were released. On June 8, a day before the EP's release, the highlight medley was revealed. On June 9, 2022, Joy was officially released in various regions digitally, alongside "Danger"'s music video. On June 10, 2022, a day after release, the album was made available for physical purchase.

== Critical reception ==
Professional ratings
Review scores
Source	Rating
IZM	4/5 stars

Writing for IZM, So Seung-geun described the EP as a step toward a more pop-oriented sound for Woo!ah!, highlighting the group’s improved vocal confidence and catchy production, while also noting areas such as choreography and musical cohesion that could be further refined.

== Promotion ==
Following the release of Joy, on June 9, 2022, Woo!ah! held a showcase that was aimed at introducing the extended play and its tracks, and connecting with fans.

Woo!ah! promoted the lead single "Danger" on various South Korean music shows such as, Show Champion, Inkigayo, and Music Bank. They also promoted "Danger" and the pre-release single "Catch the Stars" for their KCON Japan appearance in 2022.

== Track listing ==
Track listing for Joy
No.	Title	Lyrics	Music	Arrangement	Length
1.	"Danger" (단거)	Lil G; Sonny; Hae	Hae; Lil G; Sonny	Hae	3:42
2.	"Joyride"	Jennifer Eunsoo Kim	Lee Hae-sol; Louise Frick Sveen	Lee Hae-sol	3:21
3.	"Go Away"	Sonny; Lil G; Hae	Sonny; Hae; Lil G	Hae	3:03
4.	"Switch Up"	Jennifer Eunsoo Kim	Tommy Park; Antti Oikarinen; Ylva Dimberg; Tim Tan; Hautboi Rich	Antti Oikarinen; Tommy Park	3:03
5.	"Straight Up"	Kobee (Melange); Holy M (Melange)	Kobee (Melange); Lee Hyun-jun	Kobee (Melange); Lee Hyun-jun	3:36
6.	"Catch the Stars" (별 따러 가자)	Mrch	Lee Woo-min "collapsedone"; Lee Hae-sol; Justin Reinstein; Anna Timgren	Lee Woo-min "collapsedone"; Lee Hae-sol	3:20
Total length:					20:05

== Charts ==
=== Weekly charts ===
Weekly chart performance for Joy
Chart (2022)	Peak position
South Korean Albums (Circle)	13

=== Monthly charts ===
Monthly chart performance for Joy
Chart (2022)	Peak position
South Korean Albums (Circle)	36

== Sales ==
Sales for Joy
Region	Certification	Certified units/sales
South Korea	—	32,666

== Release history ==
Release history for Joy
Region	Date	Format	Label	Ref.
Various	June 9, 2022	Digital download; streaming	NV; Kakao	
Various	June 10, 2022	CD	NV; Kakao	
