= Wooah =

South Korean girl group

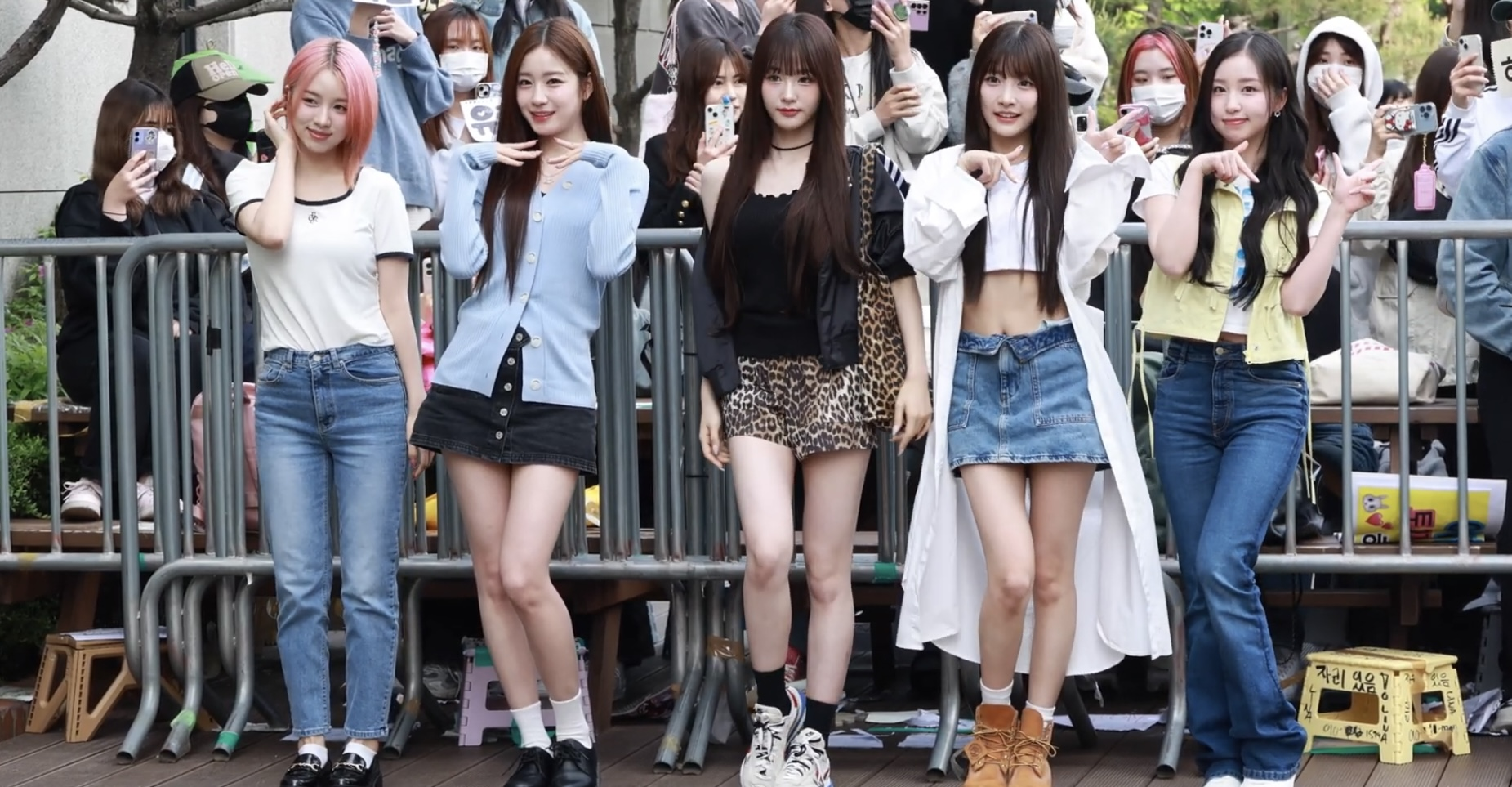
- Wooah in 2024; From left to right: Lucy, Wooyeon, Nana, Minseo, and Sora

Background information
- Also known as: Woo!ah! (2020–2024)
- Origin: Seoul, South Korea
- Genre: K-pop
- Years active: 2020–present
- Label: H Music Entertainment
- Members: Nana; Wooyeon; Sora; Lucy; Minseo
- Past members: Songyee
- Website: Official website

Wooah (/uɑː/; oo-AH; Korean: 우아; RR: Ua, stylized in all caps; formerly known as woo!ah!) is a South Korean girl group under H Music Entertainment. The group consists of five members: Nana, Wooyeon, Sora, Lucy, and Minseo. The group debuted on May 13, 2020. Originally a sextet ensemble, Songyee departed the group on August 14, 2020.

== History ==
On March 20, 2020, the girl group "Woo!ah!" was announced on radio channels. The group would be produced by NV Entertainment's director Han Ji-seok and CEO Kim Kyu-sang. Han Ji-seok is an overseas entertainment expert and had worked in SM Entertainment and Kakao M, while Kim Kyu-sang is a creative director and had produced and directed numerous artists representing Korea.

=== 2020: Debut with Exclamation, Songyee's departure and Qurious ===
On April 24, the release schedule for the group's debut single album, Exclamation, was published. Subsequently, image and solo film teasers for the members were released in the order: Wooyeon, Minseo, Lucy, Songyee, Sora, and Nana. The group made their debut on May 13 through a press showcase held at the Spigen Hall in Gangnam. However, the releases of the single album Exclamation and the music video for the title track woo!ah! was postponed to May 15, in order to show more completeness in the group through improvements in both releases.

On August 14, NV Entertainment announced that Songyee would leave the group for personal reasons.

The group made their comeback on November 24 with their second single album Qurious. The group held a press showcase and a comeback showcase for the release one day earlier.

=== 2021–2023: Wish, "Catch the Stars", Joy, Pit-a-Pat, and Queendom Puzzle ===
On May 7, 2021, a teaser photo posted on the group's social medias announced their comeback with their third single album, "Wish". "Wish" was released on May 27 with "Purple" serving as the single's title track.

On January 4, 2022, the group released their first pre-release digital single titled "Catch the Stars". On June 9, 2022, the group released their first extended play Joy and its lead single "Danger". The group's previous single "Catch the Stars" was also included in the EP. On November 16, 2022, the group released their fourth single album Pit-a-Pat and its lead single "Rollercoaster".

Members Nana and Wooyeon have participated in Mnet's reality competition show Queendom Puzzle. Nana eventually finished in 2nd place, placing her in the final lineup of the supergroup El7z Up, while Wooyeon finished in 9th place.

=== 2024–2025: "Blush" and Unframed ===
On March 27, it was reported that the group will be comeback in April. Later, it was announced that the group will be making their comeback on April 8, with the 2nd digital single "Blush", composed by Ryan S. Jhun. On April 1, the group released a promotion scheduler for the single. On April 5, the group's social media accounts were changed from woo!ah! to wooah. On April 8, the music video "Blush" was released.

On May 24, it was confirmed that they would be coming back with a new album in June. On May 31, SSQ announced that Wooah would be releasing their second mini album Unframed on June 17. On June 4, the group released a promotion scheduler for the album. On June 17, the group made their comeback with the release of the EP Unframed, along with its lead single "Pom Pom Pom".

=== 2026–present: WXW (Wish With W) ===
On April 14, 2026, it was announced that H Music had paired up with Iron ENM to release a three-part music project series for Wooah, Dxmon, and HITGS, with Wooah being planned to release an anniversary digital single on May 13 titled WXW (Wish With W): Vol.2 with "WXW (Wish With W)" serving as the lead single. Minseo's solo song "Endlessly You" was released on April 28, 2026. On July 6, it was announced that Wooah would be holding their second fan concert "WXW: Wave" on July 18, following the release of their new single "Summer" which is set to release July 13. On September 15, it was announced Wooah would release the single "Voodoo Doll" on September 29.

== Endorsements ==
On March 29, 2021, their agency announced Panasonic Korea has selected Wooah as its new brand model.

On March 23, 2023, it was announced that Wooah will be the image model for Japan's popular color contact brand Eye Closet.

On June 1, 2024, their agency H Music Entertainment announced that Wooah has been selected as the models in the Japanese market for the British fashion brand Kangol.

== Members ==
Current

- Nana (나나) – leader, vocalist, rapper, dancer
- Wooyeon (우연) - vocalist
- Sora (ソラ) (소라) - vocalist, rapper
- Lucy (루시) - rapper, dancer
- Minseo (민서) - vocalist, dancer

Former

- Songyee (송이) - vocalist, rapper

=== Timeline ===
In February 2025, Lucy suspended her activities due to sustaining a medial ankle bone fracture that required surgery. As a result, she took a two-week medical hiatus. On September 2, 2026, H Music announced Lucy would be going on a medical hiatus due to sustaining an injury.

== Discography ==
=== Extended plays ===
List of extended plays, showing selected details, selected chart positions, and sales figures
Title	Details	Peak chart positions	Sales
Title	Details	KOR	Sales
Joy	Released: June 9, 2022; Label: NV Entertainment, Kakao Entertainment; Formats: CD, digital download, streaming	13	KOR: 32,666
Unframed	Released: June 17, 2024; Label: SSQ Entertainment, Genie Music; Formats: CD, digital download, streaming	13	KOR: 33,622

=== Single albums ===
List of single albums, showing selected details, selected chart positions, and sales figures
Title	Details	Peak chart positions	Sales
Title	Details	KOR	Sales
Exclamation	Released: May 15, 2020; Label: NV Entertainment, Kakao M; Formats: CD, digital download, streaming; Track listing: 1. "woo!ah!" (우아!); 2. "Payday"	20	KOR: 5,522
Qurious	Released: November 24, 2020; Label: NV Entertainment, Kakao M; Formats: CD, digital download, streaming; Track listing: 1. "Round & Round" (빙빙빙); 2. "Bad Girl"; 3. "I Don't Miss U"	33	KOR: 4,036
Wish	Released: May 27, 2021; Label: NV Entertainment, Kakao Entertainment; Formats: CD, digital download, streaming; Track listing: 1. "Scaredy Cat" (겁쟁이); 2. "Purple"; 3. "Pandora"	10	KOR: 14,670
Pit-a-Pat	Released: November 16, 2022; Label: NV Entertainment, Kakao Entertainment; Formats: CD, digital download, streaming; Track listing: 1. "Rollercoaster"; 2. "Love Thing"	19	KOR: 34,340

=== Singles ===
List of singles, showing year released, selected chart positions, and album name
Title	Year	Peak chart positions		Album
Title	Year	KOR Down.	KOR BGM	Album
Woo!ah!
"woo!ah!" (우아!)	2020	—	—	Exclamation
"Bad Girl"	2020	—	—	Qurious
"Purple"	2021	135	—	Wish
"Catch the Stars" (별 따러 가자)	2022	54	164	Joy
"Danger" (단거)	2022	110	—	Joy
"Rollercoaster"	2022	65	162	Pit-a-Pat
Wooah
"Blush"	2024	36	—	Unframed
"Pom Pom Pom"	2024	41	—	Unframed
"WXW (Wish With W)" (Note: Released as part of the special digital single WXW (Wish With W): Vol.2.)	2026	134	—	Non-album singles
"Summer" (Note: Released as part of the special digital single WXW (Wish With W): Vol.3.)	2026	74	—	Non-album singles
"Voodoo Doll" (Note: Released as part of the special digital single WXW (Wish With W): Vol.4.)	2026	112	—	Non-album singles
"—" denotes releases that did not chart or were not released in that region.

=== Promotional singles ===
List of promotional singles, showing year released, selected chart positions, and album name
Title	Year	Peak chart positions	Album
Title	Year	KOR Down.	Album
"Secret princess" (비밀의 공주)	2024	—	Non-album promotional singles
"Shining on you"	2024	103	Non-album promotional singles
"—" denotes a recording that did not chart in that territory.

=== Other charted songs ===
List of other charted songs, showing year released, selected chart positions, and album name
Title	Year	Peak chart positions	Album
Title	Year	KOR Down.	Album
"I'll Tell You" (내가 다 해보고 말해줄게)	2024	119	Unframed
"Polaroid"	2024	121	Unframed
"Girls Love Boys" (소녀...소년을 만나다)	2024	120	Unframed
"Pom Pom Pom (EDM version)”	2024	144	Unframed
"Highlight"	2026	170	Non-album song

=== Collaborations ===
List of collaborations, showing year released, selected chart positions, and album name
Title	Year	Album
"Shining Bright" (with BAE173, Ciipher)	2021	Shining Bright

== Videography ==
=== Music videos ===
Year	Title	Album	Director(s)	Ref.
2020	"woo!ah!"	Exclamation	Min-kwang Seop (Flying Blue Whale)	
2020	"Payday" (Performance Video)	Exclamation	Spring Kim (LAUFL)	
2020	"Bad Girl"	Qurious	Bo-Hyeong Kim (FantazyLab)	
2021	"I Don't Miss U"	Qurious	Spring Kim (LAUFL)	
2021	"Purple"	Wish	Spring Kim (LAUFL)	
2022	"Catch the Stars"	Joy	Unknown	
2022	"Danger"	Joy	Spring Kim (LAUFL)	
2022	"Rollercoaster"	Pit-a-Pat	Jong-seong Kim (Studio Dalmoo)	
2024	"Blush"	Unframed	Unknown	
2024	"Secret Princess"		Unknown	
2024	"Pom Pom Pom"	Unframed	OWGE (OWGEDED)	
2024	"Shining On You"		박정	
2026	"WXW (Wish With W)"		Unknown	
2026	"Summer"		Unknown	

== Accolades ==
=== Awards and nominations ===
Name of the award ceremony, year presented, award category, nominee(s) of the award, and the result of the nomination
Award ceremony	Year	Category	Nominee(s)/work(s)	Result	Ref.
D Awards	2025	Best Girl Group Popularity Award	Wooah	Nominated	
Brand of the Year Awards	2021	Rising Star – Female Idol	Wooah	Nominated	
Brand of the Year Awards	2023	Rising Star – Female Idol	Wooah	Won	
K-World Dream Awards	2024	Girl Group Popularity Award	Wooah	Nominated	
Korea First Brand Awards	2020	Rookie Female Idol Award	Wooah	Nominated	
MAMA Awards	2020	Best New Female Artist	Wooah	Nominated	
MAMA Awards	2020	Artist of the Year	Wooah	Nominated	
MAMA Awards	2020	Fans' Choice Top 10	Wooah	Nominated	
MAMA Awards	2024	Fans' Choice Top 10 – Female	Wooah	Nominated	
The Fact Music Awards	2024	Hot Potential Award	Wooah	Won	
Starplay Awards	2021	Best Girl Group	Wooah	Nominated	

=== Listicles ===
Name of publisher, year listed, name of listicle, and placement
Publisher	Year	Listicle	Placement	Ref.
Billboard Korea	2021	Best Rookie	Placed	
