= Love by the Light of the Moon =

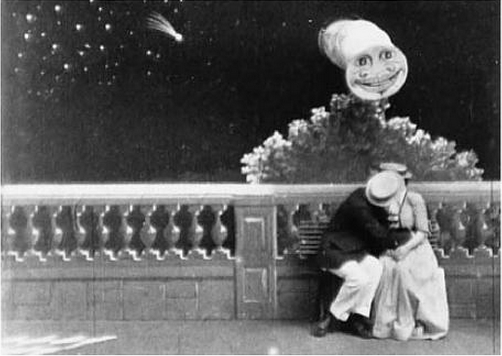
- Directed by: Edwin S. Porter
- Distributed by: Edison Manufacturing Company
- Release date: March 16, 1901
- Running time: 45 seconds
- Country: United States
- Language: Silent film

Love by the Light of the Moon is a 1901 film by Edwin S. Porter, produced by the Edison Manufacturing Company. It mixes animation and live action and predates the man in the Moon theme of the 1902 French science fiction film A Trip to the Moon by Georges Méliès. The animation is provided by projected slides showing the Moon's different faces.

== Plot ==
The Moon, painted with a smiling face, hangs over a park at night. A young couple walking past a fence lean on a railing and look up. The Moon smiles. They embrace, and the Moon's smile gets bigger. They then sit down on a bench by a tree. The Moon's view is blocked, causing him to frown. In the last scene, the man fans the woman with his hat because the Moon has left the sky and is perched over her shoulder to see everything better.

== See also ==
- By the Light of the Moon, a 1911 film also by Porter
- Edwin S. Porter filmography
