= H1-Key =

South Korean girl group

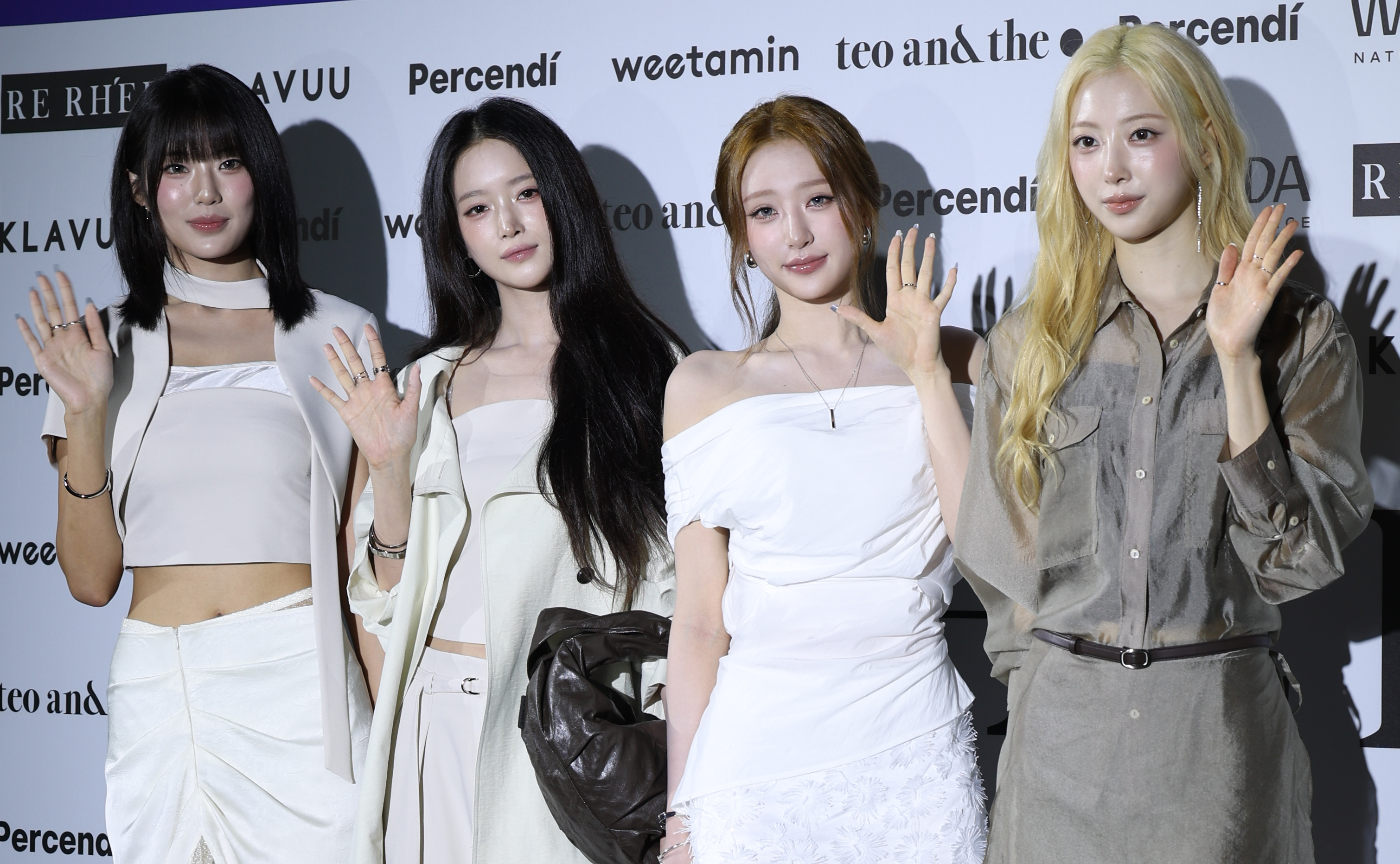
- H1-Key in September 2026 (L-R: Yel, Seoi, Hwiseo, and Riina)

Background information
- Origin: Seoul, South Korea
- Genre: K-pop
- Years active: 2022–present
- Labels: GLG; Sony Music Korea; Choi Creative Lab
- Members: Seoi; Riina; Yel; Hwiseo
- Past members: Sitala

H1-Key (/haɪ-kiː/; Korean: 하이키; read as High-key; stylized as H1-KEY) is a South Korean girl group. Formed and managed by Grandline Group (GLG) and Sony Music Korea, the group is composed of four members: Seoi, Riina, Hwiseo, and Yel. Former member Sitala left the group on May 25, 2022, and Hwiseo was introduced as a new member on June 14, 2022. They made their debut with the release of their first single album, Athletic Girl, on January 5, 2022.

== Name ==
Their group name H1-Key is pronounced and inspired by the word "High Key" and the aim for "confident" and "healthy beauty".

== History ==
=== Pre-debut activities and introductions ===
Yel was a trainee under JYP Entertainment. Riina was previously training under WM Entertainment. Sitala, daughter of the late Thai actor, singer and producer Sarunyoo Wongkrachang, was a trainee under Lionheart Entertainment. Seoi was a trainee under YG Entertainment.

On November 18, 2021, Naver News revealed that Grandline Group (GLG), the newly-established sub-label of the now defunct hip-hop based label Grandline Entertainment (GRDL), were planning to debut a new girl group on January 5, 2022. On November 20, 2021, the group opened their official social media accounts.

On November 23, 2021, Yel was announced as the group's first member through a self-choreographed cover video of "Bad Habits" by Ed Sheeran. On November 26, 2021, Seoi was introduced as the group's second member. On November 29, Riina, a former Produce 48 contestant and WM Ggumnamu member, was revealed as the third member. On November 30, Sitala was introduced as the group's fourth member. Later the members made their first full group appearance in a dance cover video for the song "Me So Bad".

==== Controversy around Sitala ====
When GLG unveiled the group's Thai member Sitala in November 2021, various K-pop fans in Thailand called for her removal, as her late father was a known supporter of the People's Alliance for Democracy, a military tyranny that ousted two democratic-elected civilian governments in the 2006 and 2014 military coup d'états. In response to the backlash, GLG issued a statement on December 8 saying that Sitala cannot be held responsible for her father's actions, which do not reflect her individual merits or political views.

=== 2021–2022: Debut with Athletic Girl, Sitala's departure and Run ===
On December 21, 2021, it was announced via social media that the group make their debut with their first single album, Athletic Girl, with the title track of the same name. Prior to the release, it was announced that the group would be partnering with Sony Music for international promotions.

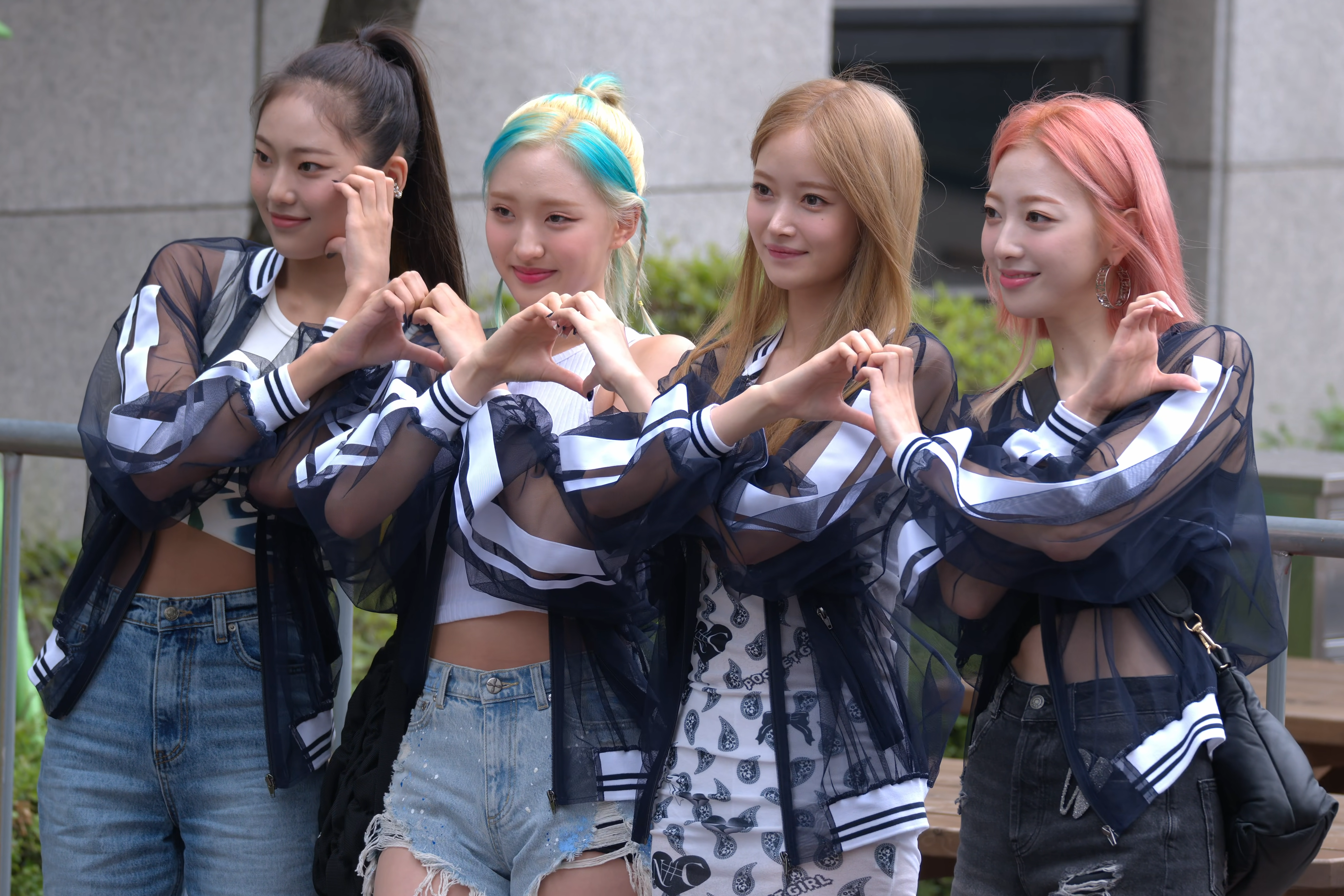
H1-Key in 2022

The album was released on January 5, 2022. They held a press showcase for the album on the same day. H1-Key made their broadcast debut on January 7, at KBS2's Music Bank.

On May 25, GLG announced that Sitala had left the group due to personal circumstances.

On June 7, it was announced that the quartet would be releasing their first maxi single album titled Run on July 6, with the addition of a new member, Hwiseo. On December 6, H1-Key confirmed their comeback on January 5, 2023, the anniversary of their debut.

=== 2023–2025: Rose Blossom, Seoul Dreaming, H1-Keynote Project, Love or Hate and Lovestruck ===
On January 5, the quartet released their first extended play titled Rose Blossom, with the title track of the same name.

In June 2023, members Riina and Hwiseo were participants in the Mnet girl group survival show Queendom Puzzle. Riina was eliminated in the second elimination round in episode 9, while Hwiseo finished in first place, debuting in the female supergroup El7z Up.

The group released their second extended play Seoul Dreaming on August 30, led by the title track "Seoul (Such a Beautiful City)". The single "Time to Shine", a pre-release of the EP, was released on August 23. The group subsequently took their first music show win on The Show on September 5.

The group would launch a music project titled H1-Keynote, beginning with the release of the digital single "Thinkin' About You" on January 19, 2024, followed by the second digital single of the project "Deeper" on February 27.

The group released their third extended play Love or Hate on June 19, 2024.

The group released their fourth extended play Lovestruck on June 26, 2025, a year after their previous release. It was then revealed that this release was co-produced by GLG and Choi Creative Lab. On August 1, it was announced that H1-Key signed with Choi Creative Lab.

=== 2026–present: Not Like a Movie and Lovechapter ===
H1-Key released the digital single "Not Like a Movie" on January 5, 2026, to commemorate the group's fourth anniversary since debut. The group released their fifth extended play Lovechapter on March 5.

The group will release the single "Unbelievable" on November 13.

== Members ==
=== Current ===
- Seoi (서이) – leader, vocalist
- Riina (리이나) – vocalist
- Yel (옐) – vocalist, rapper
- Hwiseo (휘서) – vocalist, rapper

=== Former ===
- Sitala (시탈라) – rapper, vocalist

== Discography ==
=== Extended plays ===
==== Korean EPs ====
List of Korean EPs, showing selected details, selected chart positions, and sales figures
Title	Details	Peak chart positions	Sales
Title	Details	KOR	Sales
Rose Blossom	Released: January 5, 2023; Label: GLG, Sony Music Korea; Formats: CD, digital download, streaming; Track listing: 1. "Ring the Alarm"; 2. "Rose Blossom" (건물 사이에 피어난 장미); 3. "Crown Jewel" (feat. Tachaya); 4. "You Are My Key" (for M1-Key); 5. "Dream Trip"; 6. "Rose Blossom" (건물 사이에 피어난 장미) (instrumental); 7. "Athletic Girl" (2023 Remaster)	19	KOR: 41,153
Seoul Dreaming	Released: August 30, 2023; Label: GLG, Sony Music Korea; Formats: CD, digital download, streaming; Track listing: 1. "Intro: Seoul Dreaming"; 2. "Seoul (Such a Beautiful City)"; 3. "Time to Shine" (불빛을 꺼뜨리지 마); 4. "Low-key Scared But H1-KEY Ready"; 5. "Magical Dream"; 6. "Seoul (Such a Beautiful City)" (Instrumental); 7. "Time to Shine" (Instrumental)	3	KOR: 77,524
Love or Hate	Released: June 19, 2024; Label: GLG, Sony Music Korea; Formats: CD, digital download, streaming; Track listing: 1. "Let It Burn" (뜨거워지자); 2. "Love Letter" (♥ 레터); 3. "Iconic" (나를 위한, 나에 의한, 나만의 이야기); 4. "Rainfalls" (국지성호우)	21	KOR: 19,246
Lovestruck	Released: June 26, 2025; Label: GLG, Choi Creative Lab, Sony Music Korea; Formats: CD, digital download, streaming; Track listing: 1. "Good for U"; 2. "Summer Was You" (여름이었다); 3. "One, Two, Three, Four"; 4. "Let Me Be Your Sea" (내 이름이 바다였으면해)	18	KOR: 12,052
Lovechapter	Released: March 5, 2026; Label: Choi Creative Lab, Sony Music Korea; Formats: CD, digital download, streaming; Track listing: 1. "Romantic Limit Exceeded" (낭만 한도 초과); 2. "To. My First Love" (나의 첫사랑에게); 3. "Stuck with You"; 4. "My Wish"; 5. "Not Like a Movie" (세상은 영화 같지 않더라); 6. "To. My First Love" (Instrumental); 7. "Not Like a Movie" (Instrumental)	11	KOR: 14,155

==== Japanese EPs ====
List of Japanese EPs, showing selected details, selected chart positions, and sales figures
Title	Details	Peak chart positions	Sales
Title	Details	JPN	Sales
Lovestruck (Japanese version)	Released: August 27, 2025; Label: Hub Japan Records; Formats: CD, digital download, streaming	18	JPN: 3,978

=== Single albums ===
List of single albums, showing selected details, selected chart positions, and sales figures
Title	Details	Peak chart positions	Sales
Title	Details	KOR	Sales
Athletic Girl	Released: January 5, 2022; Labels: GLG, Sony Music Korea; Formats: CD, digital download, streaming; Track listing: 1. "Athletic Girl"; 2. "Athletic Girl" (Peejay Remix; CD only); 3. "Athletic Girl" (instrumental)	70	—N/a
Run (Note: Titled as the first Maxi Single.)	Released: July 6, 2022; Labels: GLG, Sony Music Korea; Formats: CD, digital download, streaming; Track listing: 1. "Run"; 2. "Catch 'n' Release"; 3. "Heart Light"; 4. "Run" (instrumental); 5. "Catch 'n' Release" (instrumental); 6. "Heart Light" (instrumental); 7. "H1-KEY Voice Letter for M1-KEY" (CD only)	47	KOR: 2,867

=== Singles ===
List of singles, showing year released, selected chart positions, and name of the album
Title	Year	Peak chart positions		Album
Title	Year	KOR	KOR Songs	Album
"Athletic Girl"	2022	— (Note: "Athletic Girl" did not enter the Circle Digital Chart, but peaked at number 117 on the component Download Chart.)	—	Athletic Girl
"Run"	2022	— (Note: "Run" did not enter the Circle Digital Chart, but peaked at number 136 on the component Download Chart.)	—	Run
"Rose Blossom" (건물 사이에 피어난 장미)	2023	14	12	Rose Blossom
"Time to Shine" (불빛을 꺼뜨리지 마)	2023	— (Note: "Time to Shine" did not enter the Circle Digital Chart, but peaked at number 41 on the component Download Chart.)	—	Seoul Dreaming
"Seoul (Such a Beautiful City)"	2023	— (Note: "Seoul (Such a Beautiful City)" did not enter the Circle Digital Chart, but peaked at number 42 on the component Download Chart.)	—	Seoul Dreaming
"Thinkin' About You"	2024	135	—	H1-Keynote #1 (Thinkin' About You)
"Deeper"	2024	— (Note: "Deeper" did not enter the Circle Digital Chart, but peaked at number 47 on the component Download Chart.)	—	H1-Keynote #2 [기뻐 (Deeper)]
"Let It Burn" (뜨거워지자)	2024	— (Note: "Let It Burn" did not enter the Circle Digital Chart, but peaked at number 24 on the component Download Chart.)	—	Love or Hate
"Summer Was You" (여름이었다)	2025	36	—N/a	Lovestruck
"Not Like a Movie" (세상은 영화 같지 않더라)	2026	— (Note: "Not Like a Movie" did not enter the Circle Digital Chart, but peaked at number 7 on the component Download Chart.)	—N/a	Lovechapter
"To. My First Love" (나의 첫사랑에게)	2026	— (Note: "To. My First Love" did not enter the Circle Digital Chart, but peaked at number 9 on the component Download Chart.)	—N/a	Lovechapter
"—" denotes a recording that did not chart.

=== Soundtrack appearances ===
List of soundtrack appearances, showing year released, and album name
Title	Year	Album
"G.O.A.T"	2025	Spirit Fingers OST

=== Other charted songs ===
List of songs, showing year released, selected chart positions, and name of the album
Title	Year	Peak chart positions	Album
Title	Year	KOR Down.	Album
"♥ Letter"	2024	103	Love or Hate
"Iconic" (나를 위한, 나에 의한, 나만의 이야기)	2024	100	Love or Hate
"Rainfalls" (국지성호우)	2024	96	Love or Hate
"Good for U"	2025	90	Lovestruck
"Let Me Be Your Sea" (내 이름이 바다였으면 해)	2025	105	Lovestruck
"One, Two, Three, Four"	2025	123	Lovestruck

== Videography ==
=== Music videos ===
Year	Title	Director(s)	Length	Ref.
2022	"Athletic Girl"	Kim Young-jo, Yoo Seung-woo (Naive Creative Productions)	3:45	
2022	"Run"	Jimmy (VIA)	3:44	
2023	"Rose Blossom"	Na Seung-gwon (Studio L'Extreme)	4:49	
2023	"Time to Shine"	Kim Sung-jae	3:37	
2023	"SEOUL (Such a Beautiful City)	Na Seung-gwon (Studio L'Extreme)	3:26	
2024	"Thinkin' About You"	Chung Ki Youl (Postpattern)	3:26	
2024	"Deeper"	Chung Ki Youl (Postpattern)	3:48	
2024	"뜨거워지자(Let It Burn)"	Hong Joo-yeon (Highqualityfish)	3:38	
2024	"Thinking About You" ft. Josh Cullen	Unknown	3:20	
2025	"Summer Was You"	Unknown	3:49	
2026	"Not Like a Movie"	Unknown	4:05	
2026	"To My First Love"	Unknown	4:20	

== Awards and nominations ==
Name of the award ceremony, year presented, award category, nominee of the award and the result of the nomination
Award ceremony	Year	Category	Nominee(s)	Result	Ref.
Brand of the Year Awards	2023	Rising Star Female Idol	H1-Key	Won	
Korean Music Awards	2024	Song of the Year	"Rose Blossom"	Nominated	
Korean Music Awards	2024	Best K-pop Song	"Rose Blossom"	Nominated	
Korean Music Awards	2024	Rookie of the Year	H1-Key	Nominated	
Seoul Music Awards	2022	New Female Artist Award	H1-Key	Nominated	
Seoul Music Awards	2024	Hallyu Special Award	H1-Key	Nominated	
Seoul Music Awards	2024	Popularity Award	H1-Key	Nominated	
