= By the Light of the Moon (film) =

1911 film by Edwin S. Porter

By the Light of the Moon is a 1911 American single-reel silent film directed and filmed by Edwin S. Porter. It was produced for the Rex Motion Picture Company. It is one of the earliest examples of silhouette animation.

In the film, an eloping couple use an airplane to escape from the girl's disapproving father and to get to the location of their wedding.

== Plot ==
The story is about a romance between a couple. The run into many obstacles to being together, including interruption by a tramp and disapproval by the girl's parents. They decide to elope in an airplane, and her father chases them below in his automobile. They reach the minister's house and elope before the father arrives.

== Production and release ==
By the Light of the Moon was the company's third release. It revived a technique Porter had used in his 1908 film A Comedy in Black and White.

== See also ==
- Love by the Light of the Moon, a 1901 film also by Porter
