= 7+Up =

- Digital cover

EP by El7z Up
- Released: September 14, 2023
- Genre: K-pop
- Length: 16:15
- Language: Korean
- Label: Apple Monster; DG

Singles from 7+Up
- 1. "Cheeky" Released: September 14, 2023

7+Up is the debut extended play by South Korean female supergroup El7z Up. It was released by Apple Monster and DG Entertainment on September 14, 2023.

== Background and release ==
El7z Up was formed through the Mnet reality competition show Queendom Puzzle, which featured female contestants that have previously made their debut as artists. The show aired from June 13 to August 15, 2023. The group's final members were announced during the show's finale, which was broadcast live on August 15.

On August 31, it was reported that the group will be debuting on September 14. The next day, a teaser poster for the group's debut EP was released. On September 3, the EP's title was revealed to be 7+Up, along with the release of the promotion schedule. Concept photos and videos were released from September 5 to 9. On September 10, the track list was released, with "Cheeky" announced as the lead single. Two days later, the highlight medley of the tracks was released, followed by a teaser for the music video of the title track "Cheeky" the next day.

7+Up was released digitally on September 14, 2023, and in physical format a week later on September 21.

== Music ==
7+Up consists of five tracks, including the lead single "Cheeky". "Cheeky" emphasizes the confidence of people belonging to Generation Y and Z, and underscores their commitment to forging their own unique journey, undeterred by the opinions of others. It communicates the idea that there are no incorrect choices, encouraging us to follow our hearts wherever they lead.

== Track listing ==
Credits are adapted from the highlight medley video of 7+Up. English names are adapted from Spotify.

Track listing for 7+Up
No.	Title	Lyrics	Music	Arrangement	Length
1.	"Die For You"	Jade. J; Louise Udin	Ryan S. Jhun; Jay Hong; Monster No.9; Voradory; Louise Udin	Ryan S. Jhun; Jay Hong; Monster No.9; Voradory	3:27
2.	"Cheeky"	Five O'Clock (MUMW); Rum (MUMW); Y0ung (MUMW); 0310 (MUMW); Tommy Park; Andreas Öberg; Courtney Jenaé	Tommy Park; Antti Oikarinen; Andreas Öberg; Courtney Jenaé	Antti Oikarinen; Tommy Park	2:54
3.	"Undercover"	Song U (Inhouse); Kim Sun-young (Inhouse); Baek Mi-hyun (Inhouse); Neung So-hwa (Inhouse); MinorMilo (Inhouse); Seo Hwa-jeong (Inhouse); Lee Sol-bi (Inhouse)	Melange (Inhouse); Ezit (Inhouse); Jessica Pierpoint (Inhouse)	Melange (Inhouse); Ezit (Inhouse)	3:03
4.	"Hideaway"	KZ; Dint	KZ; Kim Taeyeong; Bayside Pablo; Dint	KZ; Kim Taeyeong; Bayside Pablo	3:30
5.	"Cloud 9"	Oh Yoo-won	Ryan S. Jhun; Sean Fischer; Lucas Marston; Boran; Mayu Wakisaka	Ryan S. Jhun; Sean Fischer	3:19
Total length:					16:15

== Charts ==
=== Weekly charts ===
Weekly chart performance for 7+Up
Chart (2023)	Peak position
Japan Digital Albums (Oricon)	46
South Korean Albums (Circle)	11

=== Monthly charts ===
Monthly chart performance for 7+Up
Chart (2023)	Position
South Korean Albums (Circle)	44

== Release history ==
Release history for 7+Up
Region	Date	Format	Label
Various	September 14, 2023	Digital download; streaming	Apple Monster; DG
South Korea	September 21, 2023	CD	Apple Monster; DG
