= Nana (entertainer, born 2001) =

South Korean singer and actress (born 2001)

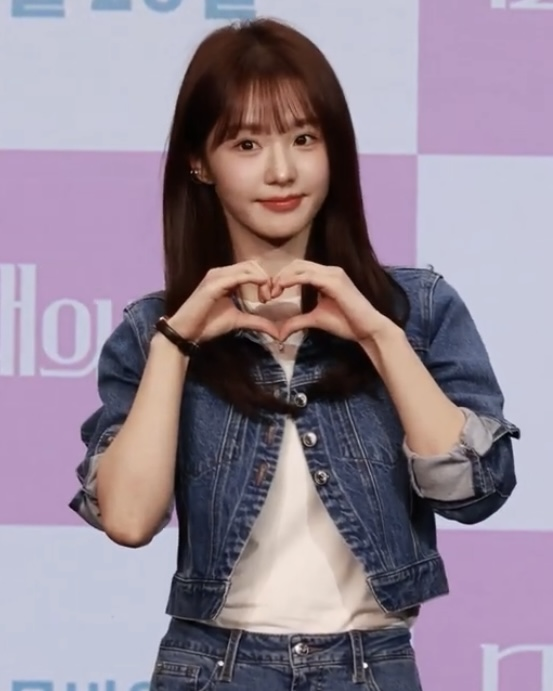
- Nana in 2025
- Born: Kwon Na-yeon; March 9, 2001 (age 25); South Korea
- Occupations: Singer; actress; dancer
- Years active: 2020–present
- Musical career
- Genre: K-pop
- Labels: H Music; Apple Monster (Note: As a member of El7z Up only.); DG
- Member of: Wooah; El7z Up

Korean name
- Hangul: 권나연
- RR: Gwon Nayeon
- MR: Kwŏn Nayŏn

Stage name
- Hangul: 나나
- RR: Nana
- MR: Nana

Kwon Na-yeon (Korean: 권나연; born March 9, 2001), better known by her stage name Nana (Korean: 나나), is a South Korean singer, actress, and dancer. She is the leader of the South Korean girl group Wooah and a member of the supergroup El7z Up, having finished second in Mnet's girl group survival reality television show Queendom Puzzle in 2023.

== Early life ==
Nana was born on March 9, 2001.

She is Catholic; however, her baptismal name has yet to be publicly disclosed.

== Career ==
=== 2019: Pre-debut ===
Prior to her official debut with Wooah, Nana appeared as the female lead in the 2019 music video for DickPunks’ single “Anyway Cheers”, credited by her given name Na-yeon.

=== 2020–present: Debut with Wooah, solo activities, and debut with El7z Up ===
Nana debuted as a member of Wooah, on May 13, 2020. The group released their debut single album, Exclamation, featuring the title track "woo!ah!". Nana made her acting debut on December 9, 2020, in the web series No Going Back Romance as Chae Bo-na.

On August 3, 2022, Nana was announced to be a cast member of the second season of SBS music television show Sing Forest. On September 22, it was announced that Nana would play the lead in the television series Fall for You. On October 27, 2022, Nana released her first solo OST for the television series, titled "Fly Away".

On February 8, 2023, she was announced as host for Show Champion, alongside Moon Sua and Tsuki of Billlie. On June 13, 2023, Nana was officially announced as a contestant for Mnet's reality survival show Queendom Puzzle. She ranked in second place in the final episode of Queendom Puzzle, thus making her debut in the final group El7z Up. On September 14, 2023, Nana officially debuted as a member of El7z Up with the release of their first EP, 7+Up. Following this, Nana stepped down from her MC role on Show Champion on November 15, 2023, after hosting the program for approximately nine months.

On April 14, 2026, it was announced Nana had been cast in a new drama titled My Idol, My Debut. On April 29, it was revealed, that through the project, she is also planned to debut in the drama's associated fictional girl group, Irion. On June 1, Nana was cast as the lead role of Suhyeon in the Lezhin Snacks short-form web series I Woke Up as a High School Girl.

== Artistry ==
=== Influences ===
Nana has cited BTS and Blackpink’s Jennie as her inspirations, expressing a desire to become an artist whom others could look up to in a similar way. In a 2020 interview with Edaily, she stated that she wanted to learn from Jennie’s stage presence, gestures, gaze, and values, and that her dream was to serve as a role model for other singers. In 2024, while appearing on the television program King of Mask Singer, she explained that she chose the mask name “Totally Lucky Vicky” because it reflected her positive personality, citing the influence of Ive member Jang Won-young’s optimistic mindset on her approach to her career.

== Public image ==
Many sources have described Nana as a "hexagonal idol", a term used for an artist who excels in multiple areas of performance. She has been recognized for her singing, rapping, dancing, acting, and variety skills throughout her career.

Nana has appeared on the Korean Business Research Institute's female celebrity brand reputation list, a chart that records Korean celebrities with the most online searches and engagements, and reached the top 30 for the month of December in 2020.

In 2022, Nana was ranked first in a fan-voted poll for female idols with “cartoon-like” visuals, receiving 37.91% of all votes, according to MBN.

From 2020 to 2024, several South Korean news outlets consistently noted a resemblance between Nana and Red Velvet member Irene.

== Other ventures ==
=== Fashion and endorsements ===
In 2021, Nana was selected to be the cover model for the February issue of the South Korean military magazine Him. Shortly after, Nana and her groupmate Wooyeon appeared on the March issue of global art and fashion magazine Maps. In October, Nana, alongside Wooyeon and Minseo, walked the runway at the 2022 Spring/Summer Seoul Fashion Week at Deoksugung Palace representing the brand HolyNumber7, this marked her first public appearance at a fashion show event.

On March 31, 2022, Nana and Minseo made their physical runway debut for the CEEANN·CBCL Fall/Winter 2022 Collection, representing the brands. In 2024, Nana appeared on the June issue of Allure Korea. On December 10, 2024, Nana and Wooyeon were chosen to attend the pop-up store opening of South Korean makeup brand Tirtir in Seongsu-dong, Seoul.

In September 2025, Nana and Wooyeon attended the Ulkin fashion show at the 2026 Spring/Summer Seoul Fashion Week held at Dongdaemun Design Plaza in Seoul, representing the brand. Later that month, Nana served as the brand muse for Panasonic Korea's new beauty products for their Vitalift and Ion Boost lines.

== Discography ==
=== Soundtrack appearances ===
List of singles, showing year released, selected chart positions, and album name
| Title | Year | Peak chart positions | | Album |
| Title | Year | KOR Down. | KOR BGM | Album |
|---|---|---|---|---|
| "Fly Away" (미지로부터) | 2022 | — | 182 | Fall for You OST |
| "Timing" | 2025 | — | — | Someday Of Me OST |
| "Memoria" (Note: with TripleS' Kaede, Aisa, and Hwang Ji-ah as "Irion".) | 2026 | 96 | — | My Idol, My Debut OST |
"—" denotes a recording that did not chart or was not released in that region.

=== Participation releases ===
List of participation releases, showing year released and album name
| Title | Year | Album |
|---|---|---|
| "Aesang" (애상) | 2022 | Sing Forest 2 |
| "Couple" (커플) | 2022 | Sing Forest 2 (Heart Fluttering) |
| "Cocktail Love" (칵테일 사랑) | 2022 | Sing Forest 2 (Love) |
| "Farewell" (이별) | 2022 | Sing Forest 2 (Farewell) |

=== Songwriting credits ===
All song credits are adapted from the Korea Music Copyright Association's database unless stated otherwise.

List of songs, showing year released, artist name, and name of the album
| Title | Year | Artist | Album | Lyricist | Composer | Ref. |
|---|---|---|---|---|---|---|
| "WXW (Wish With W)" (Note: Released as part of the digital single WXW (Wish With W): Vol.2.) | 2026 | Wooah | Non-album single | Yes | No | |

== Filmography ==
Key
| † | Denotes television productions that have not yet been released |

=== Television series ===
| Year | Title | Role | Ref. |
|---|---|---|---|
| 2022 | Fall for You | Yoo Je-bi | |
| 2026 | My Idol, My Debut | Aji | |

=== Web series ===
| Year | Title | Role | Notes | Ref. |
|---|---|---|---|---|
| 2020 | No Going Back Romance | Chae Bo-na | | |
| 2021 | Best Mistake | Yoon Ah-ra | Season 3 | |
| 2022 | Mimicus | Shin Da-ra | | |
| 2023 | Campus Freshman | Na Yeo-joo | | |
| 2025 | Someday of Me | Kong Mi-rae | | |
| 2026 | I Woke Up As A High School Girl | Suhyeon | | |

=== Television shows ===
| Year | Title | Role | Notes | Ref. |
|---|---|---|---|---|
| 2022 | Sing Forest | Cast member | Season 2 | |
| 2022 | AVA Dream | Cast member | | |
| 2023 | Queendom Puzzle | Contestant | Finished 2nd | |
| 2024 | King of Mask Singer | Contestant | | |
| 2024 | The Return of Superman | Special appearance | | |
| 2025 | King of Mask Singer | Panelist | Guest judge | |
| 2025 | A-Idol | Contestant | Finished 32nd individually (Note: As a group Wooah finished in 6th place.) | |

=== Web shows ===
| Year | Title | Role | Ref. |
|---|---|---|---|
| 2020 | Battle Koduck Show | Herself | |
| 2024 | Yeol Manager | Host | |

=== Hosting ===
| Year | Title | Notes | Ref. |
|---|---|---|---|
| 2022 | Who Are You? | | |
| 2023 | Show Champion | with Billlie's Moon Sua and Tsuki | |
| 2024 | Gominsunsak: It Was There, but It Wasn’t There | | |

== Videography ==
=== Music videos ===
| Title | Year | Director(s) | Length | Ref. |
|---|---|---|---|---|
| "Aesang" | 2022 | Unknown | 2:54 | |
| "Couple" | 2022 | Unknown | 3:38 | |
| "Cocktail Love" | 2022 | Unknown | 3:12 | |
| "Farewell" | 2022 | Unknown | 3:04 | |

=== Soundtrack music videos ===
| Title | Year | Director(s) | Length | Ref. |
|---|---|---|---|---|
| "Fly Away" | 2022 | Unknown | 3:40 | |
| "Timing" | 2025 | Unknown | 2:58 | |

=== Music video appearances ===
| Year | Title | Artist | Ref. |
|---|---|---|---|
| 2019 | "Anyway Cheers" | DickPunks | |
