= VAV (band) =

2015–2024 South Korean boy band

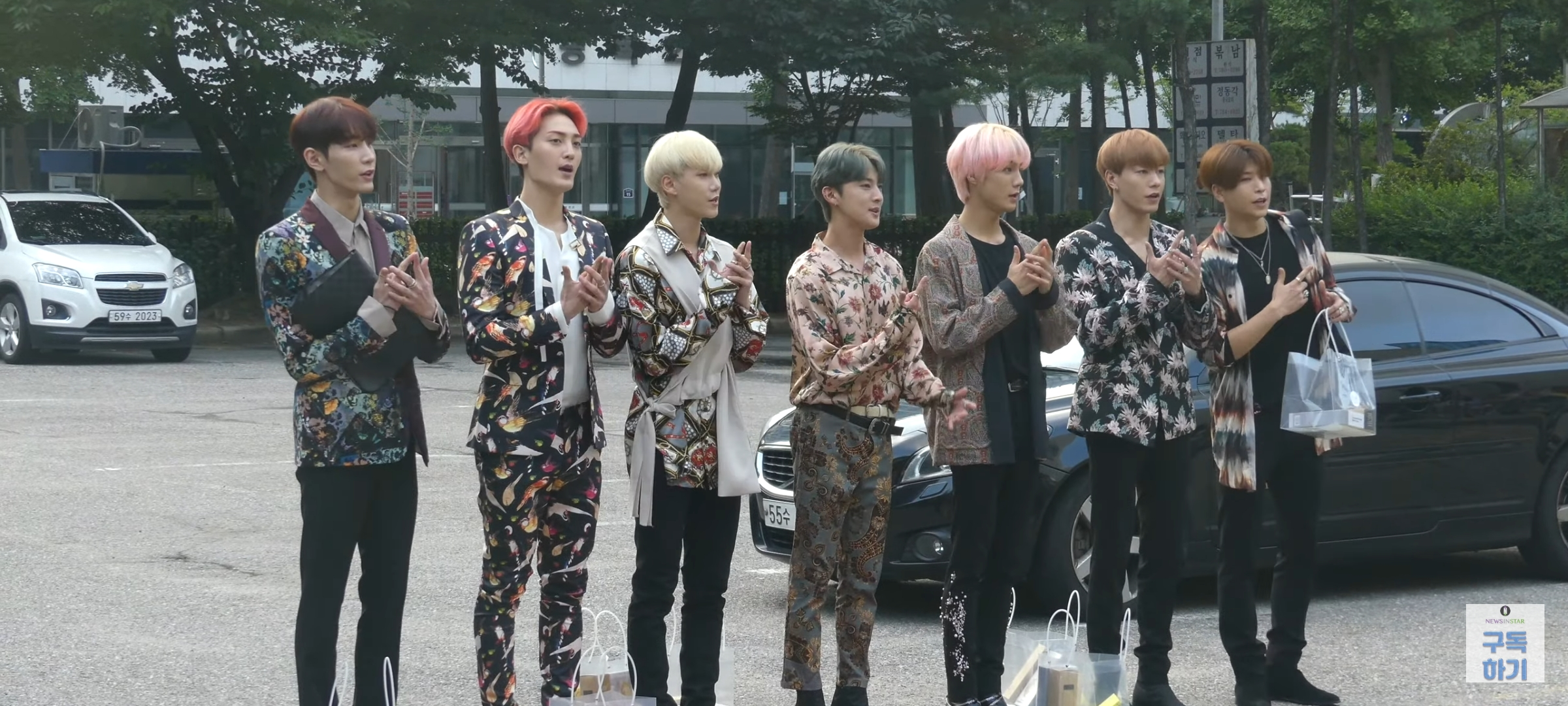
- VAV in 2018

Background information
- Also known as: Very Awesome Voice
- Origin: Seoul, South Korea
- Genres: K-pop; Dance-pop; Hip hop
- Years active: 2015–2024
- Label: A Team
- Members: St.Van; Ace; Jacob; Ayno; Lou; Ziu
- Past members: Xiao; Gyeoul; Baron; Zehan
- Website: www.ateament.co.kr

VAV (Korean: 브이에이브이; shortened from Very Awesome Voice) is a South Korean boy band formed by A Team Entertainment (formerly AQ Entertainment), a subsidiary of JYP Entertainment. The group consists of six members: St.Van, Ace, Ayno, Jacob, Lou and Ziu. They debuted on November 2, 2015, with the EP, Under the Moonlight.

== History ==
=== 2015–2017: Debut and new members ===
On November 2, 2015, VAV debuted with their first EP, Under The Moonlight co-produced with CJ E&M together with their agency, A Team Entertainment. On May 10, 2016, they released their second EP, Brotherhood, and later released a repackaged version on July 1, 2016. Xiao left the group in June 2016, followed by Zehan in December 2016, finally followed by Gyeoul in January 2017.

=== 2019–2020: Member changes and Poison ===
On March 18, 2019, they released their fourth EP, Thrilla Killa.

On July 23, 2019, they released a summer special single, Give Me More featuring Puerto Rican singer De La Ghetto and Grammy-winning production duo Play-N-Skillz. "Give Me More" was released through three different versions, with the primary one performed in Korean with some English and Spanish sprinkled in while the second is entirely performed in Spanish and English; the final variant offers up a special Play-N-Skillz remix. An instrumental version of the song was also released.

VAV's fifth EP, titled Poison, was released on October 21, 2019, The EP contains five songs, including the lead single of the same name and its instrumental, and a track co-composed and co-written by Hui.

=== 2020–2024: Military enlistments and departure from ATeam ===
On September 7, 2020, Baron enlisted in the military. VAV's sixth EP, titled Made For Two, was released on September 15, 2020, promoted as a six-member group.

On May 10, 2021, Ace enlisted in the military. On the same day, they released the special digital single Always.

On July 12, 2021, Lou and Ziu enlisted in the military.

On October 31, 2021, VAV released the digital single "Cause I Miss You" to commemorate their sixth anniversary.

On December 26, 2022, it was confirmed by the agency that Lou and Ziu will be discharged from military service on January 11, 2023, and a complete comeback was announced.

On June 12, 2023, VAV released their seventh EP titled Subcönsciòus containing five songs. The EP has the track "Designer" written by members Lou and Ayno, "Call U Mine" written by Coup D'Etat, COE and member Ace, "By My Side" written by KINDA and members Ayno and Lou, "Reason" written by Coup D'Etat, COE and member Ace and the 2023 version of "Cause I Miss You" written by members St. Van, Lou and Ayno.

On February 29, 2024, Ateam Entertainment released an official statement to announce that the exclusive contracts of all six VAV members have come to an end. The agency stated, "After much discussion, VAV and Ateam have come to an agreement to terminate the group's exclusive contract. We would like to express our appreciation to the members of VAV for their devoted commitment as our agency's artists, and we will continue to support the members' activities in the future."

== Current members ==
- St.Van (세인트반)
- Ace (에이스)
- Jacob (제이콥)
- Ayno (에이노)
- Lou (로우)
- Ziu (지우)

== Past members ==
Adapted from their Naver profile

- Xiao (샤오)
- Gyeoul (겨울)
- Baron (바론)
- Zehan (제한)

== Discography ==
=== Extended plays ===
Title	Album details	Peak chart positions	Sales
Title	Album details	KOR	Sales
Under The Moonlight	Released: November 2, 2015; Label: AQ Entertainment, CJ E&M; Formats: CD, digital download; Track listing: 1. "Under the Moonlight" (달빛 아래서); 2. "Good Bye"; 3. "Long Journey" (신세계); 4. "Under the Moonlight" (달빛 아래서) (Inst.)	57	KOR: 357
Brotherhood	Released: May 10, 2016; Label: AQ Entertainment, CJ E&M; Formats: CD, digital download; Track listing: 1. "Brotherhood"; 2. "Don't Tell a Soul" (소문내지마); 3. "Brotherhood" (Inst.); 4. "Don't Tell a Soul" (소문내지마) (Inst.)	56	KOR: 446
Brotherhood	Re-released: July 1, 2016 (No Doubt); Label: AQ Entertainment, CJ E&M; Formats: CD, digital download; Track listing: 1. "No Doubt" (노답); 2. "Mirage" (신기루); 3. "Brotherhood"; 4. "Don't Tell a Soul" (소문내지마); 5. "No Doubt" (노답) (Inst.)	30	KOR: 446
Spotlight	Released: January 29, 2018; Label: A Team Entertainment, Genie Music; Formats: CD, digital download; Track listing: 1. "Spotlight" (光); 2. "Gorgeous" (예쁘다고); 3. "Give It to Me"; 4. "She's Mine"; 5. "ABC (Middle of the Night)"; 6. "Flower (You)"; 7. "Dance with Me" (비너스); 8. "Winter Breeze"	28	KOR: 2,006
Thrilla Killa	Released: March 18, 2019; Label: A Team Entertainment, Genie Music; Formats: CD, digital download; Track listing: 1. "Thrilla Killa"; 2. "I'm Sorry"; 3. "Touch You"; 4. "Senorita"; 5. "Thrilla Killa" (Inst.)	19	KOR: 6,636
Poison	Released: October 21, 2019; Label: A Team Entertainment, Genie Music; Formats: CD, digital download; Track listing: 1. "Poison"; 2. "119"; 3. "Runway"; 4. "Sweet Heart"; 5. "Poison" (Inst.)	14	KOR: 6,563
Made For Two	Released: September 15, 2020; Label: A Team Entertainment, Genie Music; Formats: CD, digital download; Track listing: 1. "Made for Two"; 2. "Into You"; 3. "Moto"; 4. "Hold Tight" (놓지마); 5. "You Taught Me Love"; 6. "Made for Two" (Inst.)	19	KOR: 11,741
Subcönscióus	Released: June 12, 2023; Label: A Team Entertainment, Genie Music; Formats: CD, digital download; Track listing: 1. "Designer"; 2. "Call U Mine"; 3. "By My Side"; 4. "Reason"; 5. "Cause I Miss You" (보고싶어서)	18	KOR: 9,805
"—" denotes releases that did not chart.

=== Singles ===
Title	Year	Peak chart positions		Album
Title	Year	KOR	US World	Album
"Under The Moonlight" (달빛 아래서)	2015	—	—	Under The Moonlight
"Brotherhood"	2016	—	—	Brotherhood
"No Doubt" (노답)	2016	—	—	No Doubt
"Here I Am" (겨울잠)	2016	—	—	Non-album single
"Dance With Me" (비너스)	2017	—	—	Spotlight
"Flower (You)"	2017	—	—	Spotlight
"ABC (Middle Of The Night)"	2017	—	—	Spotlight
"She's Mine"	2017	—	—	Spotlight
"Spotlight" (光)	2018	—	—	Spotlight
"Gorgeous" (예쁘다고)	2018	—	—	Spotlight
"Señorita"	2018	—	19	Thrilla Killa
"So In Love"	2018	—	—	Non-album single
"Thrilla Killa"	2019	—	—	Thrilla Killa
"Give Me More"	2019	—	—	Non-album single
"Poison"	2019	—	—	Poison
"You Taught Me Love"	2020	—	—	Made For Two
"Made For Two"	2020	—	—	Made For Two
"Always"	2021	—	—	Always
"Cause I Miss You" (보고싶어서)	2021	— (Note: Did not enter Gaon Digital Chart but peaked at number 89 on Gaon BGM chart.)	—	Subcönscióus
"Designer"	2023	—	—	Subcönscióus
"—" denotes releases that did not chart.

== Awards and nominations ==
=== 7th Thailand Daradaily Awards ===
Year	Category	Nominee / work	Result	Ref.
2018	The Best Performance Award	VAV	Won	

=== Mubeat Awards ===
Year	Category	Nominee / work	Result	Ref.
2019	Best Special Stage	"Poison"	Won	
