= El7z Up =

South Korean girl group

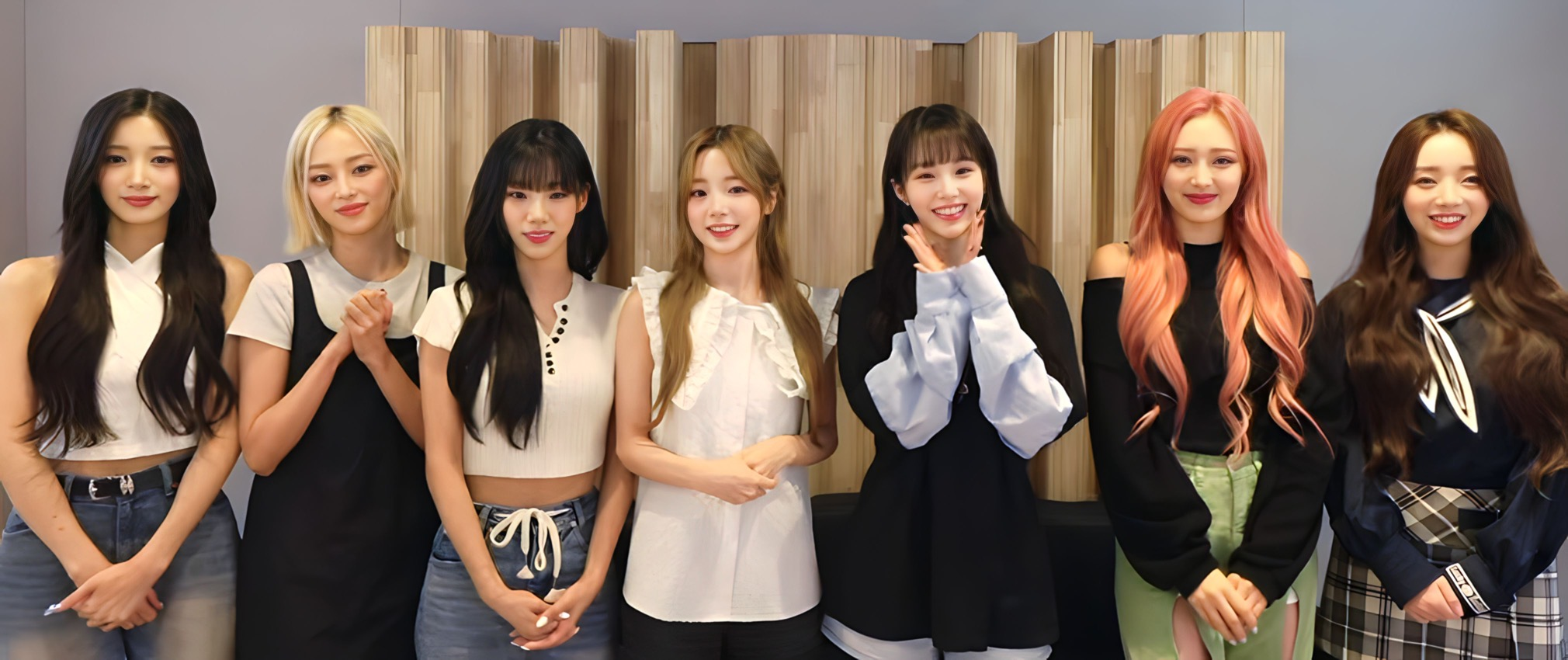
- EL7Z UP in September 2023; From left to right: Yuki, Yeeun, Yeoreum, Yeonhee, Nana, Hwiseo, and Kei

Background information
- Origin: Seoul, South Korea
- Genres: K-pop
- Years active: 2023 (Note: Under their contract, the group will release three extended plays before their official disbandment.)
- Labels: Apple Monster; DG
- Spinoff of: Lovelyz; CLC; WJSN; Rocket Punch; Wooah; H1-Key; Purple Kiss
- Members: Kei; Yeeun; Yeoreum; Yeonhee; Nana; Hwiseo; Yuki
- Website: Official website

El7z Up (Korean: 엘즈업; RR: Eljeueob; stylized in all caps or formally as EL7Z U+P) is a South Korean female supergroup project formed through the Mnet reality competition show Queendom Puzzle. The group is managed by Apple Monster and DG Entertainment, and consists of seven members: Kei from Lovelyz, Yeeun from CLC, Yeoreum from WJSN, Yeonhee from Rocket Punch, Nana from Wooah, Hwiseo from H1-Key, and Yuki from Purple Kiss. They debuted on September 14, 2023, with the extended play (EP) 7+Up.

== Name ==
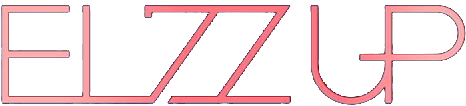
Logo of El7z Up

The group's name, El7z Up, is the word "Puzzle" spelled backwards, with the number "7" representing the number of members in the group and replacing one of the "z". The name represents "the best seven members the audience 'puzzled' out".

== History ==
=== Pre-debut: Background and formation through Queendom Puzzle ===
All members of El7z Up have previously made their debuts in other girl groups. Kei debuted as a member of Lovelyz in 2014, Yeeun debuted as a member of CLC in 2015, both of whom also debuted as soloists in 2019 and 2023 respectively. Yeoreum debuted as a member of WJSN in 2016 and as a member of WJSN's first subunit WJSN Chocome in 2020. Yeonhee debuted as a member of Rocket Punch in 2019. Nana and Yuki debuted as a member of Wooah and Purple Kiss respectively in 2020. Hwiseo debuted as a member of H1-Key in 2022.

El7z Up was formed through the reality competition show Queendom Puzzle, which aired from June 13 to August 15, 2023. The show brought together twenty-eight active female idols to form a supergroup consisting of seven members. On July 25, during the seventh episode, the name of the group was revealed. During the finale, the final seven members of the group were announced, along with the aim of a September debut later that year.

Before appearing on the show, Kei participated in the first season of the show's legacy series Queendom as part of her group Lovelyz. Yeoreum also participated in the second season as part of her group WJSN, where they finished in first place.

=== 2023–present: Debut with 7+Up, and 2023 MAMA Awards ===
On September 14, 2023, El7z Up made their debut with the EP 7+Up, along with its lead single "Cheeky". The group held their first concert in Japan titled "Piece Up", taking place in Saitama at Omiya Sonic City on October 22, in Osaka at Grand Cube Osaka on October 24, and in Tokyo at Tachikawa Stage Garden on November 26. On November 29, El7z Up appeared and performed at the 2023 MAMA Awards.

On December 5, 2023, it was reported that El7z Up will be releasing a new album in early 2024. Subsequent reports on February 26, 2024, indicated release date set in May. The group was also scheduled to perform a new song from the album at KCON Japan 2024. However, both their appearance at KCON and the album release were ultimately cancelled. By October 2024, there had yet to be any plan for further group activity.

== Members ==
- Kei (케이) – from Lovelyz
- Yeeun (예은) – from CLC
- Yeoreum (여름) – leader; from WJSN
- Yeonhee (연희) – from Rocket Punch
- Nana (나나) – from Woo!ah!
- Hwiseo (휘서) – from H1-Key
- Yuki (유키) – from Purple Kiss

== Discography ==
=== Extended plays ===
List of extended plays, showing selected details, selected chart positions, and sales figures
Title	Details	Peak chart positions		Sales
Title	Details	KOR	JPN Dig.	Sales
7+Up	Released: September 14, 2023; Labels: Apple Monster, DG Entertainment; Formats: CD, digital download, streaming	11	46	KOR: 46,867; JPN: 85 (dig.)

=== Singles ===
List of singles, showing year released, selected chart positions, and name of the album
Title	Year	Peak chart positions	Album
Title	Year	KOR DL	Album
"Cheeky"	2023	48	7+Up

=== Other charted songs ===
List of songs, showing year released, selected chart positions, and name of the album
Title	Year	Peak chart positions	Album
Title	Year	KOR DL	Album
"Die for You"	2023	167	7+Up
"Undercover"	2023	181	7+Up
"Hideaway"	2023	183	7+Up
"Cloud 9"	2023	196	7+Up

== Videography ==
=== Music videos ===
List of songs, showing year released, and directors
Title	Year	Director(s)	Ref.
"Cheeky"	2023	Unknown	

== Filmography ==
=== Reality shows ===
Year	Title	Notes	Ref.
2023	Queendom Puzzle	Reality competition show that determined the members of El7z Up	
2023	El7z Up&Go		

== Concerts and tours ==
El7z Up Japan 1st Fan Concert 'Piece Up'
Date	City	Country	Venue
October 22, 2023	Saitama	Japan	Omiya Sonic City
October 24, 2023	Osaka	Japan	Grand Cube Osaka
November 26, 2023	Tokyo	Japan	Tachikawa Stage Garden

== Awards and nominations ==
Name of the award ceremony, year presented, award category, nominee(s) and the result of the award
Award ceremony	Year	Category	Nominee/work	Result	Ref.
Asian Pop Music Awards (Note: Hosted by the Hong Kong Asia Pacific International Group and Sunway Records, the Asian Pop Music Awards bases its winners on the "Asian Pop Music Chart" which opened in September 2019.)	2023	Best New Artist (Overseas)	7+Up	Nominated	
MAMA Awards	2023	Artist of the Year	El7z Up	Longlisted	
MAMA Awards	2023	Best New Female Artist	El7z Up	Nominated	
MAMA Awards	2023	Album of the Year	7+Up	Longlisted	
Seoul Music Awards	2023	Rookie of the Year	El7z Up	Nominated	
