= Wooyeon =

South Korean singer and actress (born 2003)

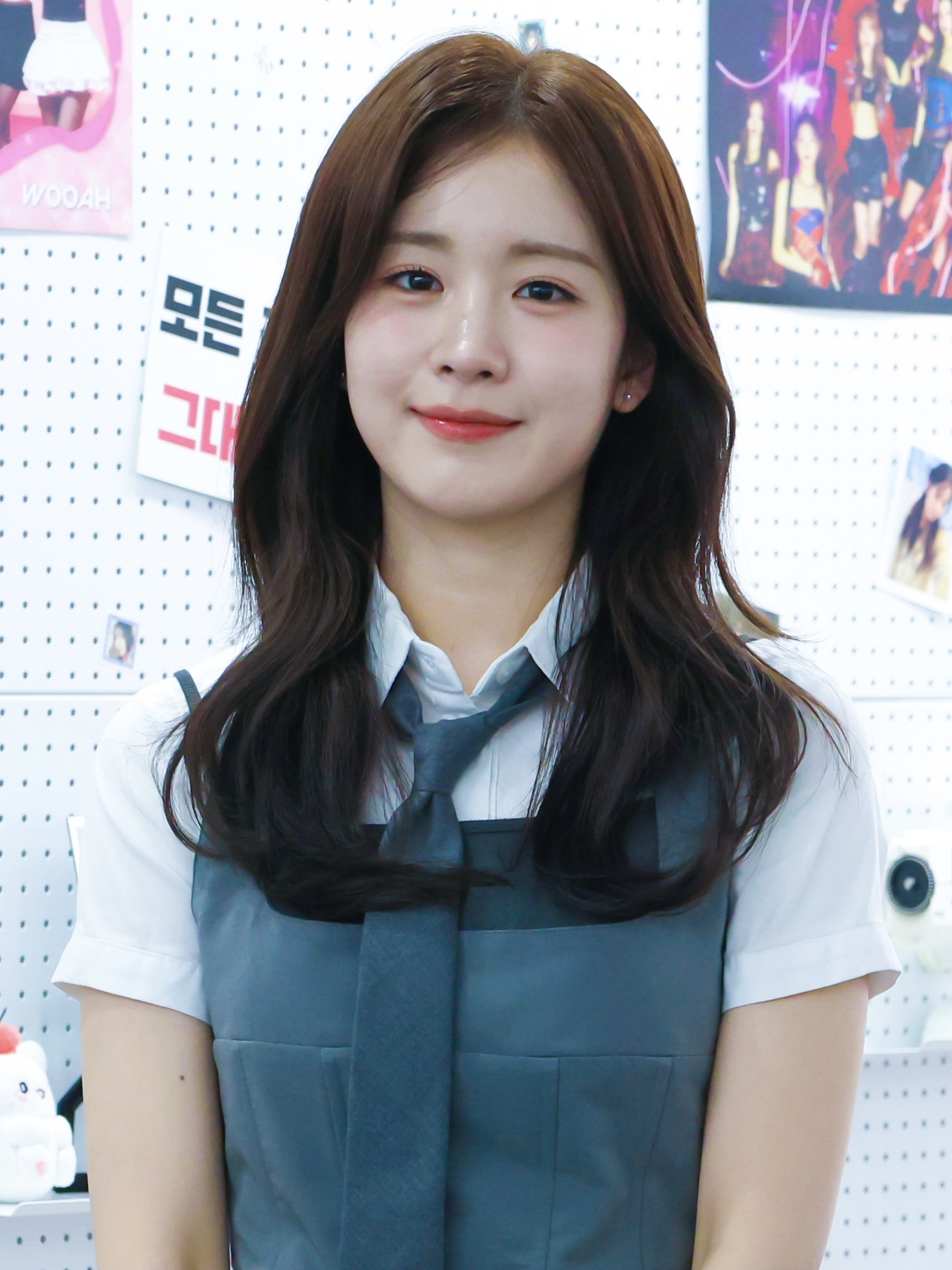
- Wooyeon in May 2026
- Born: Park Jin-kyung; February 11, 2003 (age 23); Seoul, South Korea
- Education: Suhmoon Girls' High School
- Occupations: Singer; actress
- Musical career
- Genres: K-pop
- Instrument: Vocals
- Years active: 2020–present
- Label: H Music
- Member of: Wooah

Korean name
- Hangul: 박진경
- RR: Bak Jingyeong
- MR: Pak Chin'gyŏng

Stage name
- Hangul: 우연
- RR: Uyeon
- MR: Uyŏn

Park Jin-kyung (Korean: 박진경; born February 11, 2003), better known by her stage name Wooyeon (Korean: 우연), is a South Korean singer and actress. She is a member of the South Korean girl group Wooah, formed by H Music Entertainment in 2020. As an actress, she is known for her roles in the television series Live On (2020) and the web dramas My YouTube Diary 2 (2020) and Revenge of Others (2022).

== Early life ==
Wooyeon was born on February 11, 2003, as Park Jin-kyung in Bangbae-dong, Seocho District, Seoul, South Korea. She attended Suhmoon Girls' High School. She used to be a trainee at SM Entertainment before joining H Music Entertainment (then known as NV Entertainment).

== Career ==
=== 2020–present: Debut with Wooah, and solo activities ===
Wooyeon debuted as a member of Wooah, on May 13, 2020. The group released their debut single album, Exclamation, with “woo!ah!” serving as the album’s lead single. On October 23, 2020, Wooyeon made her acting debut in the second season of the web series My YouTube Diary playing the lead role of Sha Sha.

On June 13, 2023, Wooyeon was officially announced as a contestant for Mnet's reality survival show Queendom Puzzle. She ranked in ninth place in the final episode of Queendom Puzzle, thus failing to debut in the supergroup El7z Up. Later that year, Wooyeon took a lead role in the web-series Snap and Spark as Moon Ye-ji. She released a solo song for the drama in January 2024 titled "I'll Find You".

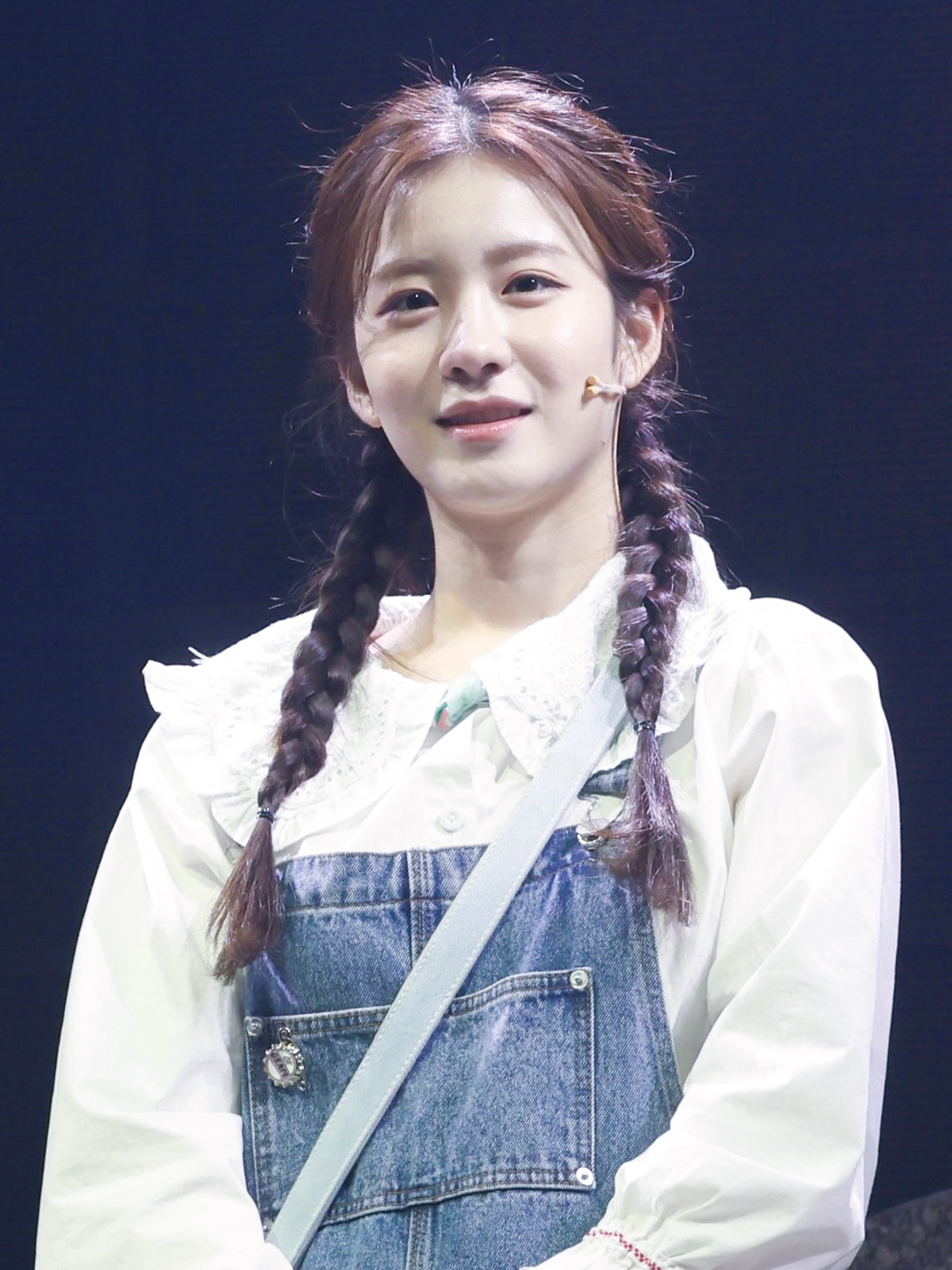
Wooyeon performing Contact in 2025

In March 2025, Wooyeon was chosen to be part of the cast of the musical drama Contact. Later in August of 2025, she alongside Ahn Ji-ho, Fromis_9’s Baek Ji-heon, and Moon Sung-hyun were confirmed to be in the cast of upcoming film Nerd Rhapsody.

== Other ventures ==
=== Fashion and endorsements ===
A few months after her debut, On October 14th, 2020, Wooyeon served as a model for Aestura's new campaign "Moisturizing Faith".

In 2021, Wooyeon and her groupmate Nana appeared on the March issue of global art and fashion magazine Maps. In October, Wooyeon, alongside Nana and Minseo, walked the runway at the 2022 Spring/Summer Seoul Fashion Week at Deoksugung Palace representing the brand HolyNumber7, this marked her first public appearance at a fashion show event.

On December 10th, 2024, Wooyeon and Nana were chosen to attend the pop-up store opening of South Korean makeup brand Tirtir in Seongsu-dong, Seoul.

In September 2025, Wooyeon and Nana attended the Ulkin fashion show at the 2026 Spring/Summer Seoul Fashion Week held at Dongdaemun Design Plaza in Seoul, representing the brand.

== Discography ==
=== Soundtrack appearances ===
List of soundtrack appearances, showing year released, selected chart positions and album name
Title	Year	Peak chart positions	Album
Title	Year	KOR BGM	Album
"Make U Move" (With Minseo) (Note: Credited under woo!ah! but the track is only sung by Wooyeon and Minseo.)	2022	—	Becoming Witch OST
"I'll Find You" (찾았다)	2024	153	Snap and Spark OST
"—" denotes a recording that did not chart or was not released in that region.

=== Songwriting credits ===
All song credits are adapted from the Korea Music Copyright Association's database unless stated otherwise.

List of songs, showing year released, artist name, and name of the album
Title	Year	Artist	Album	Lyricist	Composer	Ref.
"WXW (Wish With W)" (Note: Released as part of the digital single WXW (Wish With W): Vol.2.)	2026	Wooah	Non-album single	Yes	No	

== Filmography ==
Key
†	Denotes films that have not yet been released

=== Film ===
Year	Title	Role	Ref.
TBA	Nerd Rhapsody †	Yeom Min-ji	

=== Television series ===
Year	Title	Role	Ref.
2020	Live On	Do Woo-sol	

=== Web series ===
Year	Title	Role	Notes	Ref.
2020	My YouTube Diary	Sha Sha	Season 2	
2022	Revenge of Others	Hong Ah-jeong		
2022	Ongoing Loved One	Bo-ram		
2023	Snap and Spark	Moon Ye-ji		
2024	Caffeine Romance	Kim Yeon-joo		
2025	Peach Trap	Taek Jeong-ahn		

=== Television shows ===
Year	Title	Role	Notes	Ref.
2022	AVA Dream	Cast member		
2023	Queendom Puzzle	Contestant	Finished 9th	
2024	The Return of Superman	Special appearance		
2025	A-Idol	Contestant	Finished 33th individually (Note: As a group Wooah finished in 6th place.)	

=== Web shows ===
Year	Title	Role	Ref.
2021-present	Yonstyle	Host	

=== Hosting ===
Year	Title	Role	Ref.
2022	Show Champion	Special MC	
2023	14th INK Concert	With Golden Child's Lee Jang-jun and Xikers' Hunter	

== Videography ==
=== Music video appearances ===
Year	Title	Artist	Length	Ref.
2022	"Couple"	Nana	3:38	

== Musical theatre ==
Year	Title	Role	Korean title	Ref.
2025	Contact	Yeong-deok	컨택트	
