= Dxmon =

South Korean boy band

- Also known as: N11
- Origin: Seoul, South Korea
- Genre: K-pop
- Years active: 2024–present
- Label: H Music
- Members: Seita; Minjae; Hee; TK; Rex
- Past members: Jo
- Website: www.hmusic.co.kr/sub/dxmon/main.html

Dxmon (Korean: 다이몬; RR: Daimon; MR: Taimon: stylized in all caps) is a South Korean boy band formed in October 2023 and managed by H Music Entertainment. The group consists of five members: Seita, Minjae, Hee, TK, and Rex. They debuted on January 17, 2024, with the extended play (EP) Hyperspace.

== Name ==
The group's name, Dxmon, is derived from the Greek word "Daimon" meaning god and contains the will of their determination to achieve their own destiny.

== History ==
=== 2023: Pre-debut ===
On December 8, 2023, NV Entertainment announced that they would debut a new six-member boy group named Dxmon in January 2024. The next day, Dxmon had their first stage performance ahead of their debut at the 2023 Genie Music Festival which took place in KINTEX and performed "Viper" and "Burn Up", which the latter would be released as pre-debut single on January 1, 2024.

=== 2024–present: Debut, Hyperspace series, Jo's departure and Youth Never Die ===
On January 1, Dxmon released their pre-debut single "Burn Up" along with its music video ahead of debut. On January 8, Dxmon released the scheduler of their debut revealing the EP title Hyperspace and its lead track "Spark" to be released on January 17. On January 12, the group held a surprise fan meeting "Meet & Greet Dxmon" with various activities in Seogyo-dong, Mapo District, Seoul. On January 17, Dxmon officially debut with their first EP Hyperspace and its lead track "Spark". The group held first a media showcase in the afternoon at Ilchi Art Hall in Gangnam District, Seoul.

On April 15, SSQ announced that Dxmon would be releasing a new album in May 2024. On April 26, SSQ confirmed the exact date of Dxmon's comeback to be on May 14. On May 3, SSQ revealed the scheduler of Dxmon's first single album Hyperspace 911 and its lead track "Girls, Love Boys, Love Girls" (소년...소녀를 만나다) to be released on May 14. A day before their first comeback, Dxmon opened the pre-show of KCON Japan 2024 at Zozo Marine Stadium in Chiba, Japan. On May 14, Dxmon released their first single album Hyperspace and its lead track "Girls, Love Boys, Love Girls".

On September 29, H Music announced on their fancafe that member Jo, who took a break for health reasons, has decided to end his activities with the group and that Dxmon would continue as five-member ensemble.

On October 4, H Music announced that Dxmon would be releasing a new album on October 21. Four days later, it was announced that Youth Never Die would be the title of the group's second single album and Ryan S. Jhun participated in the production. On October 13, Dxmon's scheduler for Youth Never Die was released with various contents. On October 17, "Zip Zip Zip" (찍찍찍) was revealed as the lead track for Youth Never Die. On October 21, Dxmon held a special comeback through busking in the afternoon at Gangnam Square in Seoul and on the same day, the group released their second single album Youth Never Die and its lead track "Zip Zip Zip".

== Members ==
Current

- Seita (세이타)
- Minjae (민재) – leader
- Hee (히)
- TK (태극)
- Rex (렉스)

Former

- Jo (조; 2023–2024)

== Discography ==
=== Extended plays ===
List of extended plays, showing selected details, selected chart positions, and sales figures
Title	Details	Peak chart positions	Sales
Title	Details	KOR	Sales
Hyperspace	Released: January 17, 2024; Label: SSQ Entertainment; Formats: CD, digital download, streaming; Track listing: 1. "N.W.B"; 2. "Burn Up"; 3. "Spark"; 4. "Very" (딸기도둑); 5. "Burn Up (Instrumental)"; 6. "Spark (Instrumental)"	11	KOR: 8,669

=== Single albums ===
List of single albums, showing selected details, selected chart positions, and sales figures
Title	Details	Peak chart positions	Sales
Title	Details	KOR	Sales
Hyperspace 911	Released: May 14, 2024; Label: SSQ Entertainment; Formats: CD, digital download, streaming; Track listing: 1. "Girls, Love Boys, Love Girls" (소년...소녀를 만나다); 2. "Vitamin You"; 3. "Feel the Vibe"	7	KOR: 28,666
Youth Never Die	Released: October 21, 2024; Label: H Music Entertainment; Formats: CD, digital download, streaming; Track listing: 1. "Zip Zip Zip" (찍찍찍); 2. "Heart Balloon" (열기구); 3. "Zip Zip Zip" (찍찍찍; Instrumental)	12	KOR: 15,894

=== Singles ===
List of singles, showing year released, and name of the album
Title	Year	Album
"Burn Up"	2024	Hyperspace
"Spark"	2024	Hyperspace
"Girls, Love Boys, Love Girls" (소년...소녀를 만나다)	2024	Hyperspace 911
"Zip Zip Zip" (찍찍찍)	2024	Youth Never Die
"SSS (She's Sweet & Sour)	2026	Hyper Link: Vol.1
"DXMON"	2026	Hyper Link: Vol.2
"Make It Rain"	2026	Hyper Link: Vol.2
"Cheese	2026	Hyper Link: Vol.3
