= James Abrahart =

British singer, songwriter, record producer and arranger

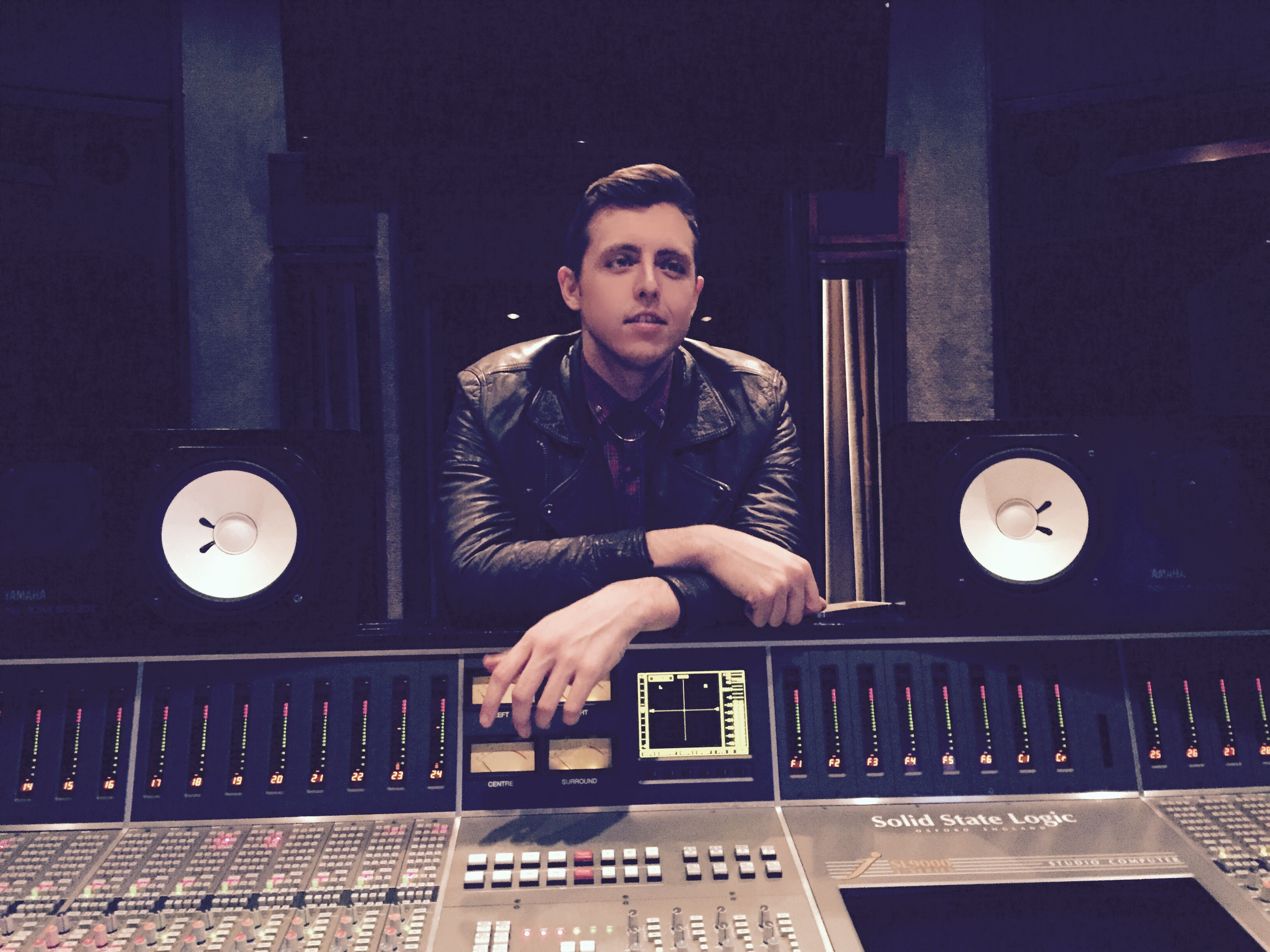
- James Abrahart at Westlake Recording Studios, West Hollywood, January 2015

Background information
- Also known as: JHart
- Born: James John Abrahart Jr. 12 June 1988 (age 38)
- Origin: Brentwood, Essex, England
- Genres: Pop, R&B, hip hop, house, tropical house, country
- Occupations: Singer, songwriter, producer, vocal producer, entrepreneur
- Years active: 2010–present

James John "JHart" Abrahart Jr. (born 12 June 1988) is a British singer, songwriter, record producer and arranger, based in Los Angeles. Signed by Mike Caren to Artist Publishing Group in 2013, he has been nominated for several Grammy Awards and worked with popular artists including Usher, Justin Bieber, Troye Sivan, Kygo, Cher, Chris Brown, Little Mix, Kylie Minogue, OneRepublic, Jennifer Lopez, Keith Urban, Jon Bellion, Kelsea Ballerini, Kevin Gates and TWICE. His output has amassed over 25 million in sales.

== Early life ==
Born in Essex, UK, he spent most of his childhood in Brentwood with his parents, brother and two sisters. His first introduction to music came when his parents bought him a drum kit, after he suffered a serious skiing accident during a school trip to the Alps. He attended Brentwood Preparatory School until the age of 12, when his parents decided to move to Atlanta, Georgia to establish the family business overseas.

Abrahart's passion for writing music intensified after joining his school gospel choir in Atlanta, with whom he sang regularly. At home he began to create and mix beats, inspired by the music of Usher, Kirk Franklin and J Moss. In 2008, Abrahart was offered a 12-month internship with producer Polow da Don where he was first introduced to the professional music scene, and just a year later he achieved his first professional breakthrough, Priscilla Renea's "Pretty Girl" on her 2009 album Jukebox.

== Music career ==
=== Major breakthrough ===
Abrahart's major breakthrough came in 2011, through a chance e-mail to manager Mike Caren, who was impressed with the tracks, and consequently flew Abrahart to Los Angeles to work with Cody Simpson. That same year, he worked on projects for Flo Rida, Wynter Gordon and Karmin, before re-locating to Los Angeles the following year at the age of 22. During the summer of 2012, Abrahart received widespread attention for his track "Take You", which featured on Justin Bieber's third studio album Believe. The album reached No. 1 in 16 countries, and sold over 3 million copies worldwide. Bieber performed the song the following year at the 2013 Billboard Music Awards.

=== Notable work ===
That same year, Abrahart penned Trey Songz' UK single "Never Again" from his studio album Chapter V, and co-wrote Jason Derulo's "Undefeated", which was performed by Derulo on the season 11 finale of American Idol. A year later he collaborated again with Derulo, this time on "Tattoo", the title track for his third studio album. In 2014, Abrahart achieved greater commercial success, with releases from Timeflies, Inna and Pitbull, Fifth Harmony, and most notably Songz' single "Change Your Mind", from his sixth studio album Trigga, which reached No. 1 on the Billboard 200.

In January 2015, Abrahart collaborated with Derulo and Hardwell on the track "Follow Me Home", which was released on the DJ's debut studio album United We Are. The album reached No.1 in the Netherlands and No. 2 on the Billboard Dance/Electronic Albums chart.

On 17 March 2015, Martin Garrix released his new single "Don't Look Down" featuring Usher, which was co-written by Abrahart. The track is the first official single from Garrix's upcoming debut album, set to be released later this year. The single reached No. 9 in the UK Charts. The same day, Atlantic Records released the soundtrack album for the film Furious 7, which features Abrahart's collaboration with Sevyn Streeter and Chloe Angelides, "How Bad Do You Want It (Oh Yeah)". The track was released as a promotional single on 23 February 2015.

In November 2015, Justin Bieber released his Billboard No. 1 album Purpose. Abrahart co-wrote two songs on the album, including "Mark My Words" and the single "Company" (#53 Billboard Hot 100). That same month, Fleur East released her debut single "Sax", which was co-written by Abrahart. The single has since been certified Platinum.

In 2016, Abrahart co-wrote Keith Urban's hit single "Wasted Time" from his album Ripcord. The single reached No. 1 on the Billboard Country Airplay Chart and the album debuted at No. 1 on the Billboard Top Country Albums Chart.

JHart also co-wrote Kevin Gates' "Know Better", which is featured on the Suicide Squad Soundtrack.

In 2025, Abrahart appeared on the Netflix music docu-reality series Hitmakers.

=== Featured artist ===
In the summer of 2012, Abrahart made his debut as a recording artist under his alias "JHart", his vocals featuring on Paul Oakenfold's dance hit "Surrender". In 2014, he penned and featured on Dirty South's "One Breath" from the album With You, and the following year, his collaboration with Vicetone, "Follow Me", was announced as the anthem for the 2015 Ultra Music Festival. The track was premièred online by Entertainment Weekly the day before its official release.

On 18 May 2015, Tritonal released "Untouchable", their new collaboration with fellow dance group Cash Cash. The single features the vocals of Abrahart.

Abrahart continued his dance success by collaborating with Australian DJ Tommy Trash on his single "Wake the Giant". The track was co-written and features vocals from Abrahart, and was released on Dutch dance label Armada Music on 13 July 2015.

Abrahart has cemented his position in the American music scene as one of the most influential young writers of his generation; in 2013, he was awarded the coveted Vilcek Prize for Creative Promise in Contemporary Music, awarded to young foreign-born artists who have demonstrated exceptional achievements.

== Songwriting credits ==
indicates a background vocal contribution.

indicates an un-credited lead vocal contribution.

indicates a credited vocal/featured artist contribution.

| Year | Artist | Album | Song | Co-written with |
|---|---|---|---|---|
| 2008 | Mýa | Sugar & Spice | "Wish You Were Here" (featuring Che'Nelle) | Mýa Marie Harrison, Canoy Watkins, Cheryline Lim |
| 2011 | Wynter Gordon | With the Music I Die | "All My Life" | Diana Gordon, Djibril Kagni, Jordan Houyez |
| 2011 | Priscilla Renea | Jukebox | "Pretty Girl" | Priscilla Renea, Warren Felder, Janey Elrod, Kendall Jackson, Rashad Taylor |
| 2012 | Angel | About Time | "Go In, Go Hard" (featuring Wretch 32) | Sirach Charles, Victoria Akintola, Ras Alexander, Ryan Williamson, Jermaine Scott |
| 2012 | Jason Derulo | Future History | "Undefeated" | Jason Desrouleaux, Justin Franks |
| 2012 | Paul Oakenfold | Non-album single | "Surrender" (featuring JHart) | Paul Oakenfold |
| 2012 | Justin Bieber | Believe | "Take You" | Justin Bieber, Raphael Judrin, Pierre-Antoine Melki, Ross Golan, Alexander Dezen, Benjamin Maddahi |
| 2012 | Trey Songz | Chapter V | "Never Again" | Tremaine Neverson, Matthew Prime, Teemu Brunila, Curtis Mayfield |
| 2012 | Loreen | Heal | "See You Again" | Lorine Talhaoui, Jeremy Coleman, Jens Gruele |
| 2012 | Angel | About Time | "Time After Time" | Sirach Charles, Timothy Thomas, Theron Thomas, Kassa Alexander, Nathan Payton |
| 2013 | Stooshe | London with the Lights On | "Round 2" | Jonathan Perry, Mo Brandis, Audra Mae Butts, Darren Lewis, Geoffrey Early, Iyola Babalola |
| 2013 | Jason Derulo | Tattoos | "Tattoo" | Jason Desrouleaux, Christopher Sernel, Justin Franks, Viny Vyas, Justin Davey |
| 2013 | Jason Derulo | Tattoos | "Fire" (featuring Pitbull) | Jason Desrouleaux, Urales Vargas, Matthew Naples, Tierce Person, Armando Perez |
| 2014 | Taeyang | Rise | "Stay with Me" (featuring G-Dragon) | Chaz Mishan, David Delazyn, Kwon Ji-Yong |
| 2014 | Trey Songz | Trigga | "Change Your Mind" | Tremaine Neverson, Marcos Palacios, Ernest Clark, Alexander Izquerdio, Mark Goodchild |
| 2014 | Inna | Party Never Ends | "Good Time" (featuring Pitbull) | Eric Frederic, Andreas Schuller, Thomas Troelsen, Armando Perez |
| 2014 | Andy Grammer | Magazines or Novels | "Red Eye" | Andrew Grammer, Thomas Meredith, Mason Levy, Joshua Kear, Abram Dean, Josiah Rosen |
| 2014 | Inna | Party Never Ends | "Take Me Higher" | Georgia Overton, Thomas Meredith, Marcel Botezan, Radu Bolfea, Sebastian Barac |
| 2014 | Union J | You Got It All - The Album | "Girl Like You" | Christopher Sernel, Joleen Belle |
| 2015 | Hardwell | United We Are | "Follow Me" (featuring Jason Derulo) | Robert van de Corput, Jason Desrouleaux, Djibril Kagni, Jordan Houyez, Dino Cirone |
| 2015 | Fifth Harmony | Reflection | "Them Girls Be Like" | Victoria McCants, Emily Schwartz, Brittany Burton, Tinashe Sibanda |
| 2015 | Vicetone | Non-album single | "Follow Me" (featuring JHart) | Ruben Den Boer, Victor Pool |
| 2015 | Sevyn Streeter | Furious 7 OST | "How Bad Do You Want It (Oh Yeah)" | Amber Streeter, Chloe Angelides, Andrew Cedar, Justin Franks, James Smith, Kledji Llupa, Theodore Economou |
| 2015 | Martin Garrix | Non-album single | "Don't Look Down" (featuring Usher) | Martijn Garritsen, Michael Busbee, Usher |
| 2015 | Tritonal | Non-album single | "Untouchable" (with Cash Cash) | Chad Cisneros, David Reed, Jean Malakhouf, Alexander Malakhouf, Samuel Frisch, Tofer Brown |
| 2015 | Tommy Trash | Non-album single | "Wake the Giant" (featuring JHart) | Thomas Olsen, Jonnali Parmenius |
| 2015 | Timeflies | Just for Fun | "Undress Rehearsal" | Calum Shapiro, Robert Resnick, Jacob Lutrell, Andreas Schuller |
| 2015 | Rita Ora | non-album single | "Body on Me" (featuring Chris Brown) | Rosina Russell, Stefan Johnson, Jordan Johnson, Marcus Lomax, Tinashe Sibanda, Christopher Brown, Balazs Harko, Robin Ellingsen |
| 2015 | Pierce Fulton | non-album single | "Landmines" (featuring JHart) | Pierce Fulton |
| 2015 | Fleur East | Love, Sax and Flashbacks | "Sax" | Fleur East, Camille Purcell, Edvard Forre Erfjord, Henrik Barman Michelsen |
| 2015 | Justin Bieber | Purpose | "Mark My Words" | Justin Bieber, Jason Boyd, Michael Tucker, Rodney Jerkins, Fredrik Halland |
| 2015 | Justin Bieber | Purpose | "Company" | Justin Bieber, Jason Boyd, James Wong, Andreas Schuller, Thomas Troelsen, Leroy Clampitt |
| 2015 | Kalin and Myles | Kalin and Myles | "I See You" | Kalin White, Myles Parrish, Charles Puth Jr., James Scheffer, Michael Burman, Isaac de Boni, Michael Mule |
| 2015 | Fleur East | Love, Sax and Flashbacks | "More and More" | Fleur East, Camille Purcell, Edvard Forre Erfjord, Henrik Barman Michelsen |
| 2015 | Fleur East | Love, Sax and Flashbacks | "Baby Don't Dance" | Fleur East, Jamie Sanderson, Charles Spurling, Hank Ballard |
| 2016 | Charlie Puth | Nine Track Mind | "Dangerously" | Charles Puth Jr., J.R. Rotem, Alexander Izquerdio, Marco Diaz Jr. |
| 2016 | Wolfgang Gartner | Non-album single | "Feel Right" (featuring JHart) | Joseph Youngman, Marty Garten |
| 2016 | K. Michelle | More Issues Than Vogue | "Make the Bed" (featuring Jason Derulo) | Jason Desrouleaux, Helen Culver, Lovy Longomba, Tinashe Sibanda |
| 2016 | Keith Urban | Ripcord | "Wasted Time" | Keith Urban, Greg Wells |
| 2016 | Fifth Harmony | 7/27 | "I Lied" | James Wong, Stefan Johnson, Jordan Johnson, Marcus Lomax, Alexander Izquerdio, Oliver Peterhof |
| 2016 | Jake Miller | Overnight | "Overnight" | Travis Mills, Ilsey Juber, James Wong, Andreas Schuller, Leroy Clampitt |
| 2016 | Chris Lane | Girl Problems | "Who's It Gonna Be" | Kevin Fisher, Nicholas Bailey, Ryan Ogren |
| 2016 | Chris Lane | Girl Problems | "All the Time" | Chelcee Grimes, Taylor Parks, Jordan Evans, Tinashe Sibanda |
| 2016 | Kevin Gates | Suicide Squad: The Album | "Know Better" | Kevin Gilyard, Gamal Lewis, Jeremy Coleman, Tinashe Sibanda, Jimmy Lavigne, Frank Brim |
| 2016 | Jake Miller | Overnight | "Good Thing" | Clarence Coffee Jr., Andreas Schuller, Joseph Spargur |
| 2016 | Idina Menzel | idina. | "Show Me" | Idina Menzel, Greg Wells |
| 2016 | Cerrone | Non-album single | "Move Me" (featuring Brendan Reilly) | Marc Cerrone, Pascal LeMaire, Brendan Reilly |
| 2016 | Zara Larsson | So Good | "I Would Like" | Zara Larsson, Stefan Johnson, Jordan Johnson, Marcus Lomax, Alexander Izquerdio, Oliver Peterhof, Karen Chin, Anthony Kelly |
| 2016 | Nathan Sykes | Unfinished Business | "Money" | Nathan Sykes, Harmony Samuels, Helen Culver, Edgar Etienne |
| 2016 | Nathan Sykes | Unfinished Business | "I'll Remember You" | Nathan Sykes, Courtney Harrel, Dernst Emile II |
| 2016 | Little Mix | Glory Days | "Power" | Camille Purcell, Daniel Omelio |
| 2016 | Little Mix | Glory Days | "Your Love" | Camille Purcell, Jeremy Coleman |
| 2016 | Stanaj | Non-album single | "Changed" | Frederik Halland, Rodney Jerkins |
| 2017 | TLC | TLC | "Way Back" (featuring Snoop Dogg) | Tionne Walkins, Dernst Emile II, Calvin Broadus |
| 2017 | Chris Blue | Non-album single | "Money on You" | Talay Riley, Tinashe Sibanda, Michael "Scribz" Riley, Michael Dupree |
| 2017 | Cade | Non-album single | "Where We Left" | Cade Larsen, Trevor Dahl, Matthew Russell, Kevin Ford |
| 2017 | Kyd the Band | Non-album single | "Feel Something" | Devin Guisande, Kyle Guisande |
| 2017 | Chris Brown | Heartbreak on a Full Moon | "This Way" | Christopher Brown, Tinashe Sibanda, Jeremy Coleman, Floyd Bentley III, Frank Brim, Andrew Benjamin, Antwan Patton |
| 2017 | Kygo | Kids in Love | "Permanent" (featuring JHart) | Kyrre Gorvell-Dahll, Jonathan Price |
| 2017 | Kelsea Ballerini | Unapologetically | "Machine Heart" | Kelsea Ballerini, Greg Wells |
| 2018 | Camila Cabello | Camila | "Something's Gotta Give" | Camila Cabello, Sarah Hudson, Jesse St. John, Alexander Schwartz, Joseph Khajadourian |
| 2018 | Camila Cabello | Camila | "In the Dark" | Camila Cabello, Madison Love, Simon Wilcox, Adam Feeney, Te Whiti Warbrick |
| 2018 | Samantha Harvey | Please EP | "Happy and You Know It" | Andrew Jackson, Adam Argyle |
| 2018 | RaeLynn | TBA | "Queens Don't" | Rachel Woodward, Corey Crowder |
| 2018 | Ghosted | Non-album single | "Feel on Me" (featuring JHart) | Thomas Barnes, Peter Kelleher, Benjamin Kohn, Uzoechi Emenike |
| 2018 | Ocean Park Standoff | Non-album single | "If You Were Mine" (featuring Lil Yachty) | Samantha Ronson, Peter Nappi, Ethan Thompson, Mathieu Jomphe Lepine |
| 2018 | Keith Urban | Graffiti U | "Never Comin' Down" | Keith Urban, Joshua Kear, Blake Carter |
| 2018 | Betty Who | Betty | "Taste" | Jessica Newham, Zak Waters, Viljar Losnegard, Hjeltnes Hagtvet |
| 2018 | Nicky Blitz | non-album single | "Good Time" | Nicholas Scapa, Brian Lee Robertson, Jacob Troth, Sebastian Teigen |
| 2018 | Kream | non-album single | "Deep End" | Daniel Slettebakken, Markus Slettebakken, James Lavigne |
| 2018 | The Vamps | Night & Day: Day Edition | "Just My Type" | Connor Ball, Tristan Evans, James McVey, Bradley Simpson, Alexander James, Iain Farquarson, Philip Plested, Jacob Manson, Tobias Tripp, Dale Anthoni |
| 2018 | Betty Who | Betty | "Just Thought You Should Know" | Jessica Newham, Peter Thomas |
| 2018 | Why Don't We | 8 Letters | "8 Letters" | Jonathan Price, Stefan Johnson, Jordan Johnson, Marcus Lomax |
| 2018 | Sigala | Brighter Days | "Revival" (featuring Cheat Codes and MAX) | Bruce Fielder, Caroline Frouyen, Trevor Dahl, Matthew Russell, Kevin Ford, Peter "LostBoy" Rycroft, Maxwell Schneider |
| 2018 | LANY | Malibu Nights | "Taking Me Back" | Paul Klein, Aaron Zuckerman |
| 2018 | Sabrina Carpenter | Singular: Act I | "Mona Lisa" | Sabrina Carpenter, Nathaniel Campany, Stefan Johnson, Jordan Johnson, Marcus Lomax, Oliver Peterhof |
| 2018 | Betty Who | Betty | "Between You & Me" | Jessica Newham, Zak Waters, Peter Thomas |
| 2018 | Little Mix | LM5 | "The National Manthem" | Leigh-Anne Pinnock, Jade Thirlwall, Sarah Hudson, Kevin White, Michael Woods |
| 2018 | Calum Scott | Only Human: Special Edition | "Need to Know" | Calum Scott, Amy Allen, Daniel Majic, Justin Franks |
| 2019 | Alec Bailey | Non-album single | "Grip" | Alec Bailey, Jonathan Dibb, Nicholas Lobel |
| 2019 | Jack & Jack | A Good Friend Is Nice | "Promise Me" | James Wong, Andrew Jackson |
| 2019 | Alma | Have You Seen Her? | "Summer" | Alma-Sofia Miettinen, Alexander Shuckburgh |
| 2019 | Betty Who | Betty | "Whisper" | Jessica Newham, Zak Waters |
| 2019 | Julian Jordan | Non-album single | "To the Wire" | Chris Loco, John Ewbank, Julian Dobbenberg, Tom Martin |
| 2019 | Jack Gray | Non-album single | "Take Our Time" | Jack Grey, Peter Harding, Benjamin McCarthy |
| 2019 | Bülow | Crystalline EP | "Word Smith" | Megan Bulow, Casey Smith, Leroy Clampitt |
| 2019 | Why Don't We | UglyDolls (soundtrack) | "Don't Change" | Corbyn Besson, Daniel Seavey, Jonah Marais, Jonathan Price, Marco Borerro, Louis Schoorl |
| 2019 | Illenium | Ascend | "Good Things Fall Apart" (with Jon Bellion) | Nicholas D. Miller, Sarah Hudson, Jason Evigan, Jonathan Bellion |
| 2019 | Liam Payne | LP1 | "Remember" | Jonathan Price, Stefan Johnson, Jordan Johnson, Marcus Lomax, Oliver Peterhof |
| 2019 | The Script | Sunsets and Full Moons | "The Last Time" | Mark Sheehan, James Berry, Danny O'Donoghue |
| 2019 | The Script | Sunsets and Full Moons | "Same Time" | Dale Anthoni, Steve James, Mark Sheehan, Danny O'Donoghue |
| 2019 | Arizona | Asylum | "Nostalgic" | Stef Johnson, Jordan Johnson, Michael Pollack, Olivia Holt, PJ Bianco, Zachary Charles, David Labuguen, Nathan Esquite |
| 2019 | Lost Kings | We Are Lost Kings (Japan EP) | "Try" | John Ryan, Axident, Norris Shanholtz, Robert Abisi |
| 2019 | Ally Brooke | | "No Good" | Alex Soifer, Daniel Majic, Dolores Drewry, James Bratton, Sermstyle, Kelly Charles, Madison Love |
| 2019 | Carlie Hanson | | "Side Effects" | Carlie Hanson, Mitch Allan, M-Phazes |
| 2019 | Hrvy | | "A Million Ways" | Blair Dreelan, George Tizzard, Hrvy, James Birt, Rick Parkhouse |
| 2019 | JHart | | "Temporary" | Ian Kirkpatrick, Ilsey Juber, Oliver Peterho, Sabrina Bernstein |
| 2020 | OneRepublic | Human | "Didn't I" | Brent Kutzle, Kygo, Ryan Tedder, Zach Skelton |
| 2020 | AJ Mitchell | Non-album single | "Burn" | Jackson Foote, Jonny Price, AJ Mitchell |
| 2020 | Tate McRae | Non-album single | "Vicious (feat. Lil Mosey)" | Mark Nilan Jr., Victoria Zaro, Tate McRae, Lathan Echols |
| 2020 | Dahl | Non-album single | "after ours" | Benjamin Harris Berger, Ryan Rabin, Ryan David Vincent McMahon, Andrew Bullimore, Trevor Dahl |
| 2020 | Cheat Codes | Non-album single | "On My Life" | Jackson Foote, Trevor Dahl |
| 2020 | Cash Cash | Non-album single | "Gasoline (feat. Laura White)" | Jean Paul Makhlouf, Alex Makhlouf, Samuel Frisch, Leroy Clampitt, E. "Kidd" Bogart |
| 2020 | Kungs | Non-album single | "Dopamine (feat. JHart)" | Kungs, Hampus Lindvall, Sarah Barrios |
| 2020 | The Vamps | Cherry Blossom | "Glory Days" | Bradley Simpson, James McVey, Connor Ball, Tristan Evans, Jordan Riley, James Abrahart |
| 2020 | The Vamps | Cherry Blossom | "Bitter" | Bradley Simpson, James McVey, Connor Ball, Tristan Evans, James Abrahart |
| 2020 | Little Mix | Confetti | "My Love Won't Let You Down" | Kamille Purcell, James Abrahart, Frank Nobel, Linus Nordstrom |
| 2020 | Jennifer Lopez | Non-album single | "In the Morning" | Jennifer Lopez, Jeremy Dussolliet, Johnny Simpson, Jackson Foote, Tim Sommers, Patrick Ingunza, Daniel Rondon |
| 2021 | John K | in case you miss me | "don't" | Benjamin Berger, Ryan McMahon, Ryan Rabin, Donte Blaise, James Abrahart, John Poulson |
| 2021 | VINCINT | There Will Be Tears | "Hard 2 Forget" | STORYBOARDS, John Greenham |
| 2021 | VINCINT | There Will Be Tears | "Higher (with Princess Precious) (feat. Alex Newell)" | Harrison Mead, Vincent Cannady |
| 2021 | VINCINT | There Will Be Tears | "Kill My Heart" | Amy Heidemann, Patrick Jordan-patrikios, Ashton Parson, Vincint Cannady |
| 2021 | VINCINT | There Will Be Tears | "Hard to Forget" | Harrison, Vincent Cannady |
| 2021 | Why Don't We | Single | "Love Back" | Daniel Seavey, Jackson Foote, Dussolliet, Johnny Simpson |
| 2021 | Troye Sivan | Single | "Angel Baby" | Jason Evigan, Michael Pollack, Sarah Hudson, Troye Sivan |
| 2021 | Fancy Hagood | Single | "Infinity" | Leland, Brett McLaughlin, Fancy Hagood, Peter Thomas |
| 2021 | Reiley | Single | "Let it Ring" | Lauren Amber Aquilina, Peter John Rees Rycroft |
| 2021 | NCT Dream | Hot Sauce | "Dive Into You" | David Wilson, Ji Yoon Seo, Wyatt Sanders |
| 2021 | Noa Kirel | Single | "Thought About That" | Nitzan Kaikov, Zach Skelton, Jason Hahs, Casey Cathleen Smith, Natania Lalwani, Noa Kirel, Miranda Glory, Jacqueline Maskanic |
| 2021 | Noa Kirel | Single | "Bad Little Thing" | Samuel Martin, Casey Smith, Samuel Ahana, Nathaniel Merchant |
| 2021 | Helene Fischer | Rausch | "Wir Werden Eins" | Alexander Standal Pavelich, Joakim Harestad Haukaas, Katerina Loules, Lukas Loules, Martin Sjolie, Tolga Saya Yildirim |
| 2022 | Ross Copperman | Single | "Stay Blessed" | Ross Copperman, Matt Mcginn |
| 2022 | Cheat Codes | HELLRAISERS, Part 3 | "Afraid of Love" | Sarah Hudson, Trevor Dahl, Jackson Foote |
| 2022 | Reiley | Single | "Blah Blah Blah" | Robert Davis, Jamie Michael Robert Sanderson, Catherine Roseanne Dennis, Roland Max Spreckley |
| 2022 | Victon | Chaos | "Stay" | Philip Cook, Nathan Cyphert, Han Se Do, Wu Hyun Park, Heui Ju Lee, Subin Kim |
| 2022 | Johnny Orlando | all the things that could go wrong | "Leave the Light On" | Kinetics, Jackson Foote |
| 2022 | 5 Seconds of Summer | 5SOS5 | "Bad Omens" | Jason Evigan, Sarah Theresa Hudson, Ashton Fletcher Irwin, Luke Robert Hemmings |
| 2022 | Måneskin | Single | "THE LONELIEST" | Damiano David, Ethan Torchio, Jason Gregory Evigan, Rami Yacoub, Sarah Theresa Hudson, Thomas Raggi, Victoria De Angelis |
| 2022 | Illenium | Single | "Worst Day" | Jason Evigan, Sarah Theresa Hudson, Max Schneider, Nicholas Miller, Taylor Dearman |
| 2022 | Leah Kate | Single | "Hot All the Time" | Alna Hofmeyer, Andrew Maxwell Goldstein, Leah Kate, Sarah Theresa Hudson |
| 2022 | Leah Kate | Alive and Unwell (Deluxe) | "Gazillionaire" | Madison Emiko Love, Sam Catalano, Kyle Joseph Buckley, Leah Kate |
| 2022 | Teddy Swims | Sleep is Exhausting | "Someone Who Loved You" | Gian Stone, Jason Evigan, Jaten Dimsdale, Jonny Price |
| 2023 | salem ilese | Single | "Painhub" | Andrew Goldstein, salem ilese |
| 2023 | Oliver Heldens | Single | "10 Out Of 10 (feat. Kylie Minogue) | Jackson Foote, Kylie Minogue, Lianna Banks, Oliver Heldens, Sarah Hudson |
| 2023 | Leah Kate | Single | "Happy" | Andrew Goldstein, Leah Kate, Lowell Boland |
| 2023 | Leah Kate | Single | "Super Over" | Andrew Goldstein, Leah Kate, Lowell Boland, Madison Love |
| 2023 | Kodak Black, NLE Choppa, Jimin, JVKE, Muni Long | FAST X (Original Motion Picture Soundtrack) | "Angel Pt. 1" | Bill Kapri, Bryson Potts, Daniel Majic, Jackson Foote, Jauquez Lowe, Jeremy Dussolliet, Johnny Simpson, Mark Nilan Jr., Tylon Freeman |
| 2023 | JVKE, Jimin, Charlie Puth, Muni Long | Single | "Angel Pt. 2" | Bill Kapri, Bryson Potts, Cate Downey, Charlie Puth, Daniel Majic, Jackson Foote, Jake Lawson, Jaucquez Lowe, Jeremy Dussolliet, Johnny Simpson, Mark Nilan Jr., Tylon Freeman, Zachary Lawson |
| 2023 | LANY | Single | "XXL" | Andrew Goldstein, Jesse St. John, Paul Jason Klein |
| 2023 | Cher | Christmas (Cher album) | "DJ Play a Christmas Song" | Sarah Hudson, Jesse St. John, Leland (musician), Mark Schick, Lionel Crasta, Mark Taylor (Music Producer) |
| 2023 | NCT 127 | Fact Check | "Angel Eyes" | Jeremy Dussolliet, Johnny Simpson, Jackson Foote, Jack Avery, Jonah Marais, Corbyn Besson, Lee Taeyong, Mark Lee |
| 2024 | Riize | Riizing | "Impossible" | David "Dwilly" Wilson, Dewain Whitmore Jr. |
| 2024 | Enhypen | Romance: Untold | "Brought the Heat Back" | JHart, Jesse Saint John, Cirkut, Yu Bin Hwang, Danke, "Hitman" Bang, Inverness |
| 2025 | JADE | That's Showbiz Baby | "It Girl" | JHart, Henry Walter, Jade Thirlwall, Lauren Aquilina, Peter Rycroft |
| 2025 | TWICE | This is For | "Seesaw" | Amy Allen, Leroy Clampitt, Megan Bülow |
