= Parker Ighile =

British producer

- Born: Parker Oseomwan Ibrahim Ighile-Peters; 1 March 1990 (age 36); Pinner, London, England
- Genres: R&B; pop; hip hop; grime; alternative hip-hop
- Occupations: Record producer; singer; songwriter; rapper
- Years active: 2009–present
- Label: Heavy On It

Parker Ibrahim Ighile (born Parker Oseomwan Ibrahim Ighile-Peters; 1 March 1990) is a British record producer, rapper, singer and songwriter. He was born in London. He was the first act to sign to Trinidadian-born rapper Nicki Minaj's record label, Heavy On It, in 2012. As a producer, artist and songwriter, Ighile has worked with Quincy Jones, G-Eazy, Nicki Minaj, Rihanna, Jessie J, Ariana Grande, Grace, Delta Goodrem, Rita Ora, N-Dubz, Chipmunk, and Livvi Franc. At the age of 18, he started his professional music career, producing Chipmunk's song "Oopsy Daisy", which reached number one in the UK Charts.

== Life and career ==
=== Early life and career beginnings ===
Parker Ighile was born in London where he lived with his mother and sister Asabe Ighile. His father and mother are Nigerian, from Benin City and Kaduna, respectively. He began composing and producing at the age of 11 when he and numerous church friends formed a rap group. In his teens made grime music under the name Piztol. The church his family attended was instrumental in Parker's early musical ventures and he studied music in college and university where he began learning music theory. Parker's music is influenced by a dynamic range of genres but more noticeably R&B, rap, garage and Bollywood music – due to frequent exposure to his grandmother's diverse tastes in music and cinema.

At 18, Ighile produced and co-wrote his first of many major releases; Chipmunk's first and number one single, "Oopsy Daisy". Parker produced and co-wrote seven songs in total on the I Am Chipmunk album which peaked at number two in the UK Albums Chart and was Certified Gold. He went on to write with The Invisible Men and Jessie J and co-wrote her debut single, "Do It like a Dude" as well as "Who's Laughing Now". More credits include a song on N-Dubz's Love.Live.Life album, which he cowrote with Ina Wroldsen. He used trans-genre influences to create a unique and dynamic sound and also produced Angel's "Wonderful", debuting at number 20 for the week ending July 21 — reaching a peak on top 10 at number nine several weeks later; and Conor Maynard's "Vegas Girl".

=== 2012–present: Record deal and Young, Dumb & 21 ===
Ighile teamed up with music strategist Efe Ogbeni, who was heavily involved in the success of producer RedOne, to help propel him further into the music business. On 15 November 2012, American rapper Nicki Minaj announced that Ighile was signed as the first official artist to her as of yet, unnamed label. She has described his artistry as "lethal and dope". He has since produced Minaj's "Hell Yeah" and Rihanna's "What Now". In late 2012, a song titled "So Beautiful" leaked on the internet, and Ighile announced some weeks later on Twitter that he was working on a mixtape, Young, Dumb & 21, which is set to be released in early 2013 and that "So Beautiful" would act as the first single. Ighile's artistry is usually compared to Sting's and Fela's; and his production to that of Kanye West.

On 22 February 2013, Parker released a music video for his mixtape's leading track, "So Beautiful", onto his official YouTube account. The video is set in black and white, which follows the story of a young couple. He would later release a remix to the song that features Nigerian musician MI Abaga. Vibe Magazine describes Ighile's sound as Electro-Soul. Ighile defined his sound as Progressive Urban Pop, PUP, sometimes referred to as Progressive Afro Pop, P.A.P during an interview with [Billboard.com]. Speaking about "So Beautiful" Ighile tells Billboard.com, “This song is an introduction to my sound, Progressive Urban Pop (P.U.P) or Progressive Afro Pop (P.A.P).”

=== Partnership with Samsung Galaxy ===
Parker Ighile, in collaboration with Quincy Jones and Samsung, produced his own version of "Over the Horizon", the official song of the Samsung Galaxy products. The official song and video performance have been released in August 2013 on the Samsung Galaxy Music website.

=== Other projects ===
Among his projects, Parker Ighile is executive producing Australian singer Grace Sewell.

During Summer 2013, Parker Ighile took part of the Quincy Jones 80th Birthday Celebration in Asia with concerts in Korea and Japan.

== Discography ==
=== Mixtapes ===
- 20?? – Young, Dumb and 21

=== Singles ===
==== As lead artist ====
Song	Release date
"So Beautiful"	2012
"Heavens Playground"	2013
"Beneath The Silence"	2013
"The Opposition"	2013
"This Is America"	2014

=== Other songs ===
==== As featured artist ====
Song	Year	Artist	Album
"Hell Yeah"	2012	Nicki Minaj (featuring Parker Ighile)	Pink Friday: Roman Reloaded – The Re-Up
"Remember Me"	2024	Nicki Minaj (featuring Parker Ighile)	The Pinkprint: Tenth Anniversary Edition

=== Writing and production credits ===
Title	Year	Artist(s)	Album
"Oopsy Daisy"	2009	Chipmunk	I Am Chipmunk
"Saviour"	2009	Chipmunk	I Am Chipmunk
"Lose My Life"	2009	Chipmunk featuring N-Dubz	I Am Chipmunk
"Beast"	2009	Chipmunk featuring Loick Essien	I Am Chipmunk
"Business"	2009	Chipmunk featuring Young Spray	I Am Chipmunk
"Uh Ay"	2009	Chipmunk	I Am Chipmunk (Platinum Edition)
"History"	2009	Chipmunk featuring Wretch 32	I Am Chipmunk (Platinum Edition)
"What If You Knew"	2010	Gabriella Cilmi	Ten
"Invisible Girl"	2010	Gabriella Cilmi	Ten
"Love Sick"	2010	N-Dubz featuring Ny	Love.Live.Life
"Do It like a Dude"	2010	Jessie J	Who You Are
"Who's Laughing Now"	2011	Jessie J	Who You Are
"Foul"	2011	Chipmunk	Transition
"Wonderful"	2012	Angel	About Time
"Vegas Girl"	2012	Conor Maynard	Contrast
"So Beautiful"	2012	Parker Ighile	Young, Dumb & 21
"What Now"	2012	Rihanna	Unapologetic
"Hell Yeah"	2012	Nicki Minaj featuring Parker Ighile	Pink Friday: Roman Reloaded – The Re-Up
"Heaven's Playground"	2012	Parker Ighile	Young, Dumb & 21
"The World"	2013	Angel	About Time
"Piano"	2013	Ariana Grande	Yours Truly
"Heart Hypnotic"	2013	Delta Goodrem	TBA
"Beneath The Silence"	2013	Parker Ighile	TBA
"The Opposition"	2013	Parker Ighile	Young, Dumb & 21
"Us"	2014	Angel	TBA
"This Is America	2014	Parker Ighile featuring G-Eazy	Young, Dumb & 21
"Four Door Aventador"	2014	Nicki Minaj	The Pinkprint
"You Don't Own Me"	2015	Grace featuring G-Eazy	Memo
"Romeo"	2019	Tamera	TBA
"Poison"	2023	NCT Dream	ISTJ

=== Remixes ===
Title	Year	Artist(s)	Album
"This Girl" (Parker Ighile House Of Hausa Mix)	2014	Stafford Brothers featuring Eva Simons and T.I.	Non-album single
