= Strange Muse =

- Digital cover

EP by Nmixx
- Released: October 19, 2026
- Length: 17:04
- Languages: Korean; English
- Labels: JYP; Republic

Nmixx chronology
Heavy Serenade (2026)	Strange Muse (2026)

Singles from Strange Muse
- 1. "Birthday Wish" Released: October 19, 2026

Strange Muse is the sixth extended play by South Korean girl group Nmixx. It was released by JYP Entertainment and Republic Records on October 19, 2026, and contains six tracks, including the lead single "Birthday Wish".

== Background and release ==
On September 21, 2026, upon the release of the track list, JYP Entertainment announced that Nmixx would be releasing their sixth extended play titled Strange Muse on October 19, with the lead single "Birthday Wish" and three unit songs — the first since the group's debut. The promotion schedule and motion poster were released over the following two days. From September 28 to 30, the album trailer and concept photos were released. On October 11, an a cappella highlight medley video of the album's first three group tracks was released. The original highlight medley video of all the tracks was subsequently released on October 15. On October 18, the music video teaser for "Birthday Wish" was released. The extended play was released on October 19, alongside the music video for "Birthday Wish".

== Track listing ==
Track listing for Strange Muse
No.	Title	Lyrics	Music	Arrangement(s)	Length
1.	"Birthday Wish" (긴 소원)	Yu Ga-young (Artiffect); Seo-rin (Artiffect); Song Hee-yoon (Onclassa); Since; Jeon Ye-jin (Jam Factory); Kim Sang-eun (Jam Factory); Jeon Se-hui (Inhouse); Kristine Bogan	2Summery; Kristine Bogan; Ido Nadjar	2Summery	3:20
2.	"Kerosene"	Jonjon (XYXX); Lee Eun-hwa	Shinkung; Arineh Karimi; Boy Blue; Taet Chesterton	Shinkung; Boy Blue	2:46
3.	"Rude Talk"	Baek Ji-woo (Onclassa); Choi Bo-ra (153/Joombas); Danke; Mia (153/Joombas); Kim Chae-ah (153/Joombas); Bae	Celine Polenghi; Kayla Diamond; Dor Daniel (KanDi); Nitzan Kaikov (KanDi)	K-KOV (KanDi)	2:34
4.	"Sing to the Moon" (너는 달; Lily, Haewon)	Jang Da-in (Artiffect); Haewon; Kim Su-ji; Lily	Ryan S. Jhun; Katrina "Neya" Klith; Marcus Elkjer	Ryan S. Jhun; Katrina "Neya" Klith; Marcus Elkjer	4:00
5.	"Hot 'n Unbothered" (Sullyoon, Bae)	Seora; Bae; Sullyoon	Brett Koolik; Lauren Dyson; Robert Ziff Resnick	Rez	2:19
6.	"Whip" (휙; Jiwoo, Kyujin)	Danke; Jiwoo; Kyujin	Inverness; Ryan S. Jhun; 8AE; Sorana; Kyujin	Inverness; Ryan S. Jhun	2:05
Total length:					17:04

== Charts ==
=== Weekly charts ===
Weekly chart performance for Strange Muse
Chart (2026)	Peak position
French Physical Albums (SNEP)	98
Greek Albums (IFPI)	99
Japanese Digital Albums (Oricon)	19
Japanese Download Albums (Billboard Japan)	16
South Korean Albums (Circle)	2
US Top Album Sales (Billboard)	11
US World Albums (Billboard)	3

=== Monthly charts ===
Monthly chart performance for Strange Muse
Chart (2026)	Peak Position
South Korean Albums (Circle)	10

== Release history ==
Release history for Strange Muse
Region	Date	Format	Label
South Korea	October 19, 2026	CD; LP	JYP; Republic
Various	October 19, 2026	Digital download; streaming	JYP; Republic
