= 52nd Academy of Country Music Awards =

US music awards ceremony in 2017

- Date: April 2, 2017
- Location: T-Mobile Arena, Las Vegas, Nevada
- Hosted by: Luke Bryan; Dierks Bentley

Highlights
- Most wins: Brothers Osborne; Florida Georgia Line; Miranda Lambert; Thomas Rhett; (2 each)
- Most nominations: Miranda Lambert (5)

Television/radio coverage
- Network: CBS

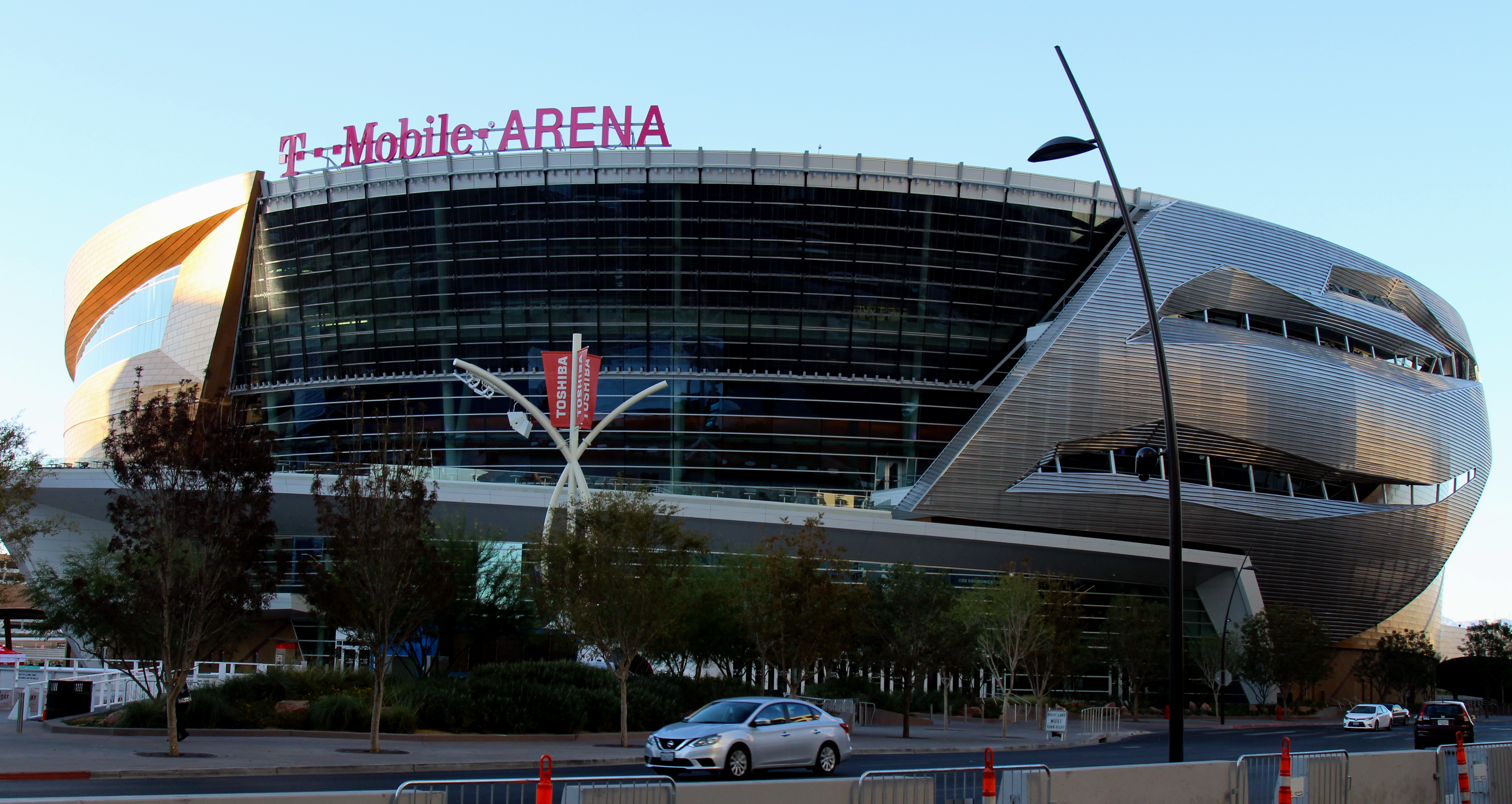
Exterior of the T-Mobile Arena in Las Vegas.

The 52nd Academy of Country Music Awards, also known as the 2017 ACM Awards, were held at the T-Mobile Arena in Las Vegas, Nevada, on April 2, 2017. Nominations for the 52nd Academy of Country Music Awards were announced on February 16, 2017. Luke Bryan returned to host the show for his fifth consecutive year, with co-host Dierks Bentley returning for his second consecutive year.

== Winners and Nominations ==
The winners are shown in bold.

Entertainer of the Year	Album of the Year
**Jason Aldean**; Luke Bryan; Florida Georgia Line; Carrie Underwood; Keith Urban	**The Weight of These Wings – Miranda Lambert**; Black – Dierks Bentley; Dig Your Roots – Florida Georgia Line; Hero – Maren Morris; Ripcord – Keith Urban
Female Artist of the Year	Male Artist of the Year
**Miranda Lambert**; Kelsea Ballerini; Maren Morris; Kacey Musgraves; Carrie Underwood	**Thomas Rhett**; Jason Aldean; Dierks Bentley; Chris Stapleton; Keith Urban
Group of the Year	Duo of the Year
**Little Big Town**; Eli Young Band; Old Dominion; Lady Antebellum; Rascal Flatts	**Brothers Osborne**; Big & Rich; Dan + Shay; Florida Georgia Line; Maddie & Tae
Single of the Year	Song of the Year
**"H.O.L.Y." – Florida Georgia Line**; "Blue Ain’t Your Color" – Keith Urban; "Humble and Kind" – Tim McGraw; "My Church" – Maren Morris; "Vice" – Miranda Lambert	**"Die a Happy Man" – Thomas Rhett, Sean Douglas, Joe Spargur**; "Blue Ain’t Your Color" – Clint Lagerberg, Hillary Lindsey, Steven Lee Olsen; "Humble and Kind" – Lori McKenna; "Kill a Word" – Eric Church, Luke Dick, Jeff Hyde; "Tennessee Whiskey" – Dean Dillon, Linda Hargrove; "Vice" – Miranda Lambert, Shane McAnally, Josh Osborne
New Female Artist of the Year	New Male Artist of the Year
**Maren Morris**; Lauren Alaina; Cam; Brandy Clark	**Jon Pardi**; Kane Brown; Chris Janson; Chris Lane; Brett Young
New Vocal Duo or Group of the Year	Video of the Year
**Brothers Osborne**; A Thousand Horses; Dan + Shay; LoCash; Maddie & Tae	**"Forever Country" – Artists of Then, Now & Forever**; "Fire Away" – Chris Stapleton; "Humble and Kind" – Tim McGraw; "Peter Pan" – Kelsea Ballerini; "Vice" – Miranda Lambert
Vocal Event of the Year	Songwriter of the Year
**"May We All" – Florida Georgia Line (feat. Tim McGraw)**; "Different for Girls" – Dierks Bentley (feat. Elle King); "Forever Country" – Artists of Then, Now & Forever; "Setting the World on Fire" – Kenny Chesney (feat. P!nk); "Think of You" – Chris Young (feat. Cassadee Pope)	**Lori McKenna**; Ashley Gorley; Luke Laird; Hillary Lindsey; Shane McAnally

== Performances ==
Performer(s)	Song(s)
Various artists	2017 ACM Awards Opening Medley
Dierks Bentley; Luke Bryan; Joe Walsh	“Johnny B. Goode” (Chuck Berry Tribute)
Jason Aldean	"Any Ol' Barstool"
Kelsea Ballerini	“Yeah Boy”
Dierks Bentley	“Black”
Brothers Osborne	"It Ain't My Fault"
Luke Bryan	"Fast"
Lady Antebellum	"You Look Good"
Sam Hunt	"Body Like a Back Road"
Miranda Lambert	"Tin Man"
Little Big Town	"Happy People"
Maren Morris	"I Could Use a Love Song"
Jon Pardi	"Dirt on My Boots"
Rascal Flatts	"Yours If You Want It"
Chris Stapleton	"Second One to Know"
Brett Eldredge	"Somethin' I'm Good At"
Old Dominion	"No Such Thing as a Broken Heart"
Reba McEntire; Lauren Daigle	"Back To God"
Tim McGraw; Faith Hill	"Speak to a Girl"
Thomas Rhett; Maren Morris	"Craving You"
Cole Swindell; Dierks Bentley	"Flatliner"
Keith Urban	“Blue Ain't Your Color”
Keith Urban; Carrie Underwood	“The Fighter”
Florida Georgia Line; Backstreet Boys	“God, Your Mama, and Me”
Florida Georgia Line; Backstreet Boys	"Everybody (Backstreet's Back)"

== See also ==
- Academy of Country Music Awards
