= Blue Ain't Your Color =

Single by Keith Urban

from the album Ripcord
- Released: 8 August 2016
- Recorded: 2016
- Genre: Country; country pop; blues
- Length: 3:50
- Label: Hit Red; Capitol Nashville
- Songwriters: Steven Lee Olsen; Hillary Lindsey; Clint Lagerberg
- Producers: Dann Huff; Keith Urban

Keith Urban singles chronology
"Wasted Time" (2016)	"Blue Ain't Your Color" (2016)	"The Fighter" (2017)

"Blue Ain't Your Color" is a song recorded by Australian and American country music singer Keith Urban, and written by Steven Lee Olsen, Hillary Lindsey and Clint Lagerberg. It was released on August 8, 2016, as the fourth single from Urban's 2016 album Ripcord. To date, this is Urban’s most recent number one song.

The song was a commercial and chart success. In the United States, it reached number one on the US Billboard Hot Country Songs, and Country Airplay charts for 12 straight weeks in that position on the former. It also peaked at number 24 on the Billboard Hot 100.

"Blue Ain't Your Color" also received two Grammy nominations at the 59th Grammy Awards – Best Country Solo Performance for Urban and Best Country Song for its songwriters. It also won both the CMA Award for Single of the Year and the American Music Award for Favorite Country Song in 2017. The song was also nominated for Single for the Year at the 52nd Academy of Country Music Awards.

== Content ==
"Blue Ain't Your Color" is about a male observing a lonely woman at a bar who is dissatisfied in her current relationship. This song is set in the key of G major and has a 6/8 time signature and a main chord pattern of G–Am–C–D–G.

== Chart performance ==
In the US, "Blue Ain't Your Color" reached number one on the US Country Airplay chart, and number one on the US Hot Country Songs chart. It remained at that position for twelve consecutive weeks until it was knocked off by "Better Man", performed by Little Big Town.

Blue Ain't Your Color debuted at number 73 on the US Billboard Hot 100 and eventually reached its peak at number 24 on the chart. It became Urban's nineteenth top 40 hit on the US Billboard Hot 100, his seventh top 30 hit and first top 30 hit since "We Were Us" in 2013. In June 2017, the song reached a million copies in sales. As of December 2017, the single has sold 1,163,000 copies in the US. On March 18, 2019, the single was certified quadruple platinum by the Recording Industry Association of America (RIAA) for combined sales and streaming data of over four million units in the United States.

== Music video ==
The music video was directed by motion picture director Carter Smith and premiered in September 2016. It shows Urban singing on the stage while a woman (played by Amber Valletta) comes into the bar crying and playing the jukebox and dancing to the song.

== Charts ==
=== Weekly charts ===
Chart (2016–2017)	Peak position
Canada Hot 100 (Billboard)	40
Canada Country (Billboard)	1
US Billboard Hot 100	24
US Adult Contemporary (Billboard)	14
US Country Airplay (Billboard)	1
US Hot Country Songs (Billboard)	1

=== Year-end charts ===
Chart (2016)	Position
US Hot Country Songs (Billboard)	39

Chart (2017)	Position
US Adult Contemporary (Billboard)	30
US Country Airplay (Billboard)	47
US Hot Country Songs (Billboard)	13

=== Decade-end charts ===
Chart (2010–2019)	Position
US Hot Country Songs (Billboard)	9

== Certifications ==
Region	Certification	Certified units/sales
Australia (ARIA)	2× Platinum	140,000^{‡}
Canada (Music Canada)	Platinum	80,000^{‡}
New Zealand (RMNZ)	Platinum	30,000^{‡}
United States (RIAA)	6× Platinum	6,000,000^{‡}
^{‡} Sales+streaming figures based on certification alone.
