= Wasted Time (Keith Urban song) =

Single by Keith Urban

from the album Ripcord
- Released: 4 April 2016
- Recorded: 2016
- Genre: Country pop; dance-pop
- Length: 3:53 (album version); 3:43 (single version)
- Label: Hit Red; Capitol Nashville
- Songwriters: Keith Urban; Greg Wells; James Abrahart
- Producers: Greg Wells; Keith Urban

Keith Urban singles chronology
"Break on Me" (2015)	"Wasted Time" (2016)	"Blue Ain't Your Color" (2016)

"Wasted Time" is a song co-written and recorded by Australian and American country music artist Keith Urban. It was released on 4 April 2016 as the third single from his 2016 album Ripcord. The song was written by Urban, Greg Wells and James Abrahart.

== Promotion ==
Ahead of the release of the song, as his final performance on American Idol, the show on which Urban has been a judge since 2012, he sang "Wasted Time", playing the "ganjocaster", a combination between a banjo and electric guitar built by his former bandmate Brian Nutter.

Urban also performed the song at the 51st Academy of Country Music Awards playing the banjo and earned a standing ovation from the crowd.

Another performance of the song featured a cover of Johnny Cash's "Folsom Prison Blues". It was released on his 2025 album High and A(live), which was recorded during his High and Alive World Tour.

== Chart performance ==
"Wasted Time" reached its peak at number four on the US Hot Country Songs chart and number 51 on the US Billboard Hot 100. The song also topped the US Country Airplay chart in its thirteenth week, making this song Urban's twentieth number one on this chart and stayed atop the chart for a second consecutive week. As of August 2016, it has sold 269,000 copies in the US On February 24, 2017, the single was certified gold by the Recording Industry Association of America (RIAA) for combined sales and streaming data of over 500,000 units in the United States.

== Music video ==
The music video was directed by John Urbano and premiered in April 2016.

== Charts ==
=== Weekly charts ===
Chart (2016)	Peak position
Australia (ARIA)	72
Canada Hot 100 (Billboard)	40
Canada AC (Billboard)	5
Canada Country (Billboard)	1
Canada Hot AC (Billboard)	19
US Billboard Hot 100	51
US Country Airplay (Billboard)	1
US Hot Country Songs (Billboard)	4

=== Year-end charts ===
Chart (2016)	Position
Canada (Canadian Hot 100)	96
US Country Airplay (Billboard)	34
US Hot Country Songs (Billboard)	25

== Certifications and sales ==
Region	Certification	Certified units/sales
Australia (ARIA)	Platinum	70,000^{‡}
Canada (Music Canada)	Gold	40,000^{*}
United States (RIAA)	Platinum	1,000,000^{‡}
^{*} Sales figures based on certification alone.^{‡} Sales+streaming figures based on certification alone.
