= Heavy Serenade =

- Digital cover

EP by Nmixx
- Released: May 11, 2026
- Length: 16:12
- Languages: Korean; English
- Labels: JYP; Republic

Nmixx chronology
Blue Valentine (2025)	Heavy Serenade (2026)	Strange Muse (2026)

Singles from Heavy Serenade
- 1. "Heavy Serenade" Released: May 11, 2026

Heavy Serenade is the fifth extended play by South Korean girl group Nmixx. It was released by JYP Entertainment and Republic Records on May 11, 2026, and contains six tracks, including the lead single of the same name.

== Background and release ==
On April 14, 2026, upon the release of a promotion schedule, JYP Entertainment announced that Nmixx would be releasing their fifth extended play titled Heavy Serenade on May 11, with the lead single of the same name, and a music video for the track "Crescendo" to be pre-released on April 28. The album trailer was released on April 21, and the track listing was revealed alongside the motion poster on the following day. Group concept photos were released on April 24 and 25, with the latter set featuring the members posing in front of a background that evokes sheet music. The teaser and music video for the album's first track "Crescendo" were released on April 27 and 28 respectively. On May 3 and 7, the a cappella and original highlight medley videos of the album's tracks were released respectively. The music video teaser for the lead single was released on May 10. The extended play was released on May 11, alongside the music video for the lead single.

== Promotion ==
On April 24, 2026, prior to the extended play's release, Nmixx performed the fifth track "Superior", along with previously released songs, on the Spotify Stage at the Eve Festa of the esports festival, LCK Team Roadshow: T1 Home Ground, at the Inspire Arena in Incheon. On May 11, Nmixx held a countdown live event on YouTube to celebrate the release of the extended play and connect with their fanbase.

== Critical reception ==
Professional ratings
Review scores
Source	Rating
IZM	3/5 stars
AllMusic	4/5 stars

Matt Collar of AllMusic gave the album a 4-star rating, praising the group's "outsized vocal harmonies and dance hooks".

Writing for Billboard, Jeff Benjamin named Heavy Serenade the third best K-pop album of 2026 in its mid-year rankings. He compared it favorably to the group's previous release, Blue Valentine, saying the album "doesn’t just clear that bar but raises it."

== Track listing ==
Track listing for Heavy Serenade
No.	Title	Lyrics	Music	Arrangement(s)	Length
1.	"Crescendo"	Lily; Kim Min-jeong (Lalala Studio); Hyeon Ji-won; Baek So-hyeon (Inhouse); Kim Se-jin (Artiffect); Mehere (Artiffect)	2Summery; Kristine Bogan; Ido Nadjar	2Summery	2:39
2.	"Heavy Serenade"	Hanroro	Esum; Ayushy (The Hub); Awrii (The Hub); Maribelle Anes; Josefin Glenmark; Seora; SSo	Esum	3:00
3.	"Ideserveit"	Park Ji-woo (Onclassa); Kim Da-bin (Inhouse); Lee Eun-hwa (153/Joombas); Danke; Yoon Ye-ji (PNP)	Agwi; Mulay; Bleem; Suh-ee	Agwi; Bleem; Suh-ee	2:44
4.	"Different Girl"	Since; Bae; Lee Aeng-du (153/Joombas); Jeon Ye-ji (Jamfactory); Jiggy (153/Joombas)	Kyle Buckley; Anthony Watts; Bava	Kyle Buckley	2:23
5.	"Superior"	Danke; Chan-ran (Inhouse); Jang Eun-ji (Artiffect); Wutan (Up); Baek Sae-im (PNP); Gu Sam-yeong (153/Joombas); Baek Deul (PNP); Choi Bo-ra (PNP)	Esum	Esum	2:36
6.	"Loud"	Lily	Upsahl; Carla; Alex Goldblatt; Robin "Rob Knox" Tadros; Khris Riddick-Tynes; Ryan S. Jhun	Alex Goldblatt; Khris Riddick-Tynes; Robin "Rob Knox" Tadros; Ryan S. Jhun	2:50
Total length:					16:12

== Charts ==
=== Weekly charts ===
Weekly chart performance for Heavy Serenade
Chart (2026)	Peak position
Croatian International Albums (HDU)	35
French Albums (SNEP)	176
Japanese Albums (Oricon)	35
Japanese Hot Albums (Billboard Japan)	52
Scottish Albums (Official Charts)	62
South Korean Albums (Circle)	1
UK Album Downloads (Official Charts)	85
UK Physical Albums (OCC)	99
US Billboard 200	182
US World Albums (Billboard)	3

=== Monthly charts ===
Monthly chart performance for Heavy Serenade
Chart (2026)	Peak position
South Korean Albums (Circle)	10

== Certifications ==
Certifications for Heavy Serenade
Region	Certification	Certified units/sales
South Korea (KMCA)	Platinum	250,000^{^}
^{^} Shipments figures based on certification alone.

== Release history ==
Release history for Heavy Serenade
Region	Date	Format	Label
South Korea	May 11, 2026	CD	JYP; Republic
Various	May 11, 2026	Digital download; streaming	JYP; Republic
