= The Fighter (Keith Urban song) =

Single by Keith Urban featuring Carrie Underwood

from the album Ripcord
- Released: 6 February 2017
- Recorded: 2016
- Studio: Kensaltown Studios (London, England); EastWest Studios (Los Angeles, CA); SmithLee Productions (St. Louis, MO)
- Genre: EDM; pop; country
- Length: 3:04
- Label: Hit Red; Capitol Nashville
- Songwriters: Keith Urban; busbee
- Producers: Keith Urban; busbee

Keith Urban singles chronology
"Blue Ain't Your Color" (2016)	"The Fighter" (2017)	"Female" (2017)

Carrie Underwood singles chronology
"Dirty Laundry" (2016)	"The Fighter" (2017)	"The Champion" (2018)

Music video
- "Keith Urban - The Fighter ft. Carrie Underwood (Official Music Video)" on YouTube

"The Fighter" is a song by Australian-American country music singer Keith Urban featuring American country music singer Carrie Underwood. It was released on 6 February 2017 as the fifth and final single from Urban's 2016 album, Ripcord. Urban co-wrote and co-produced this song with busbee. The song has entered the record charts of Australia, Canada, the United States, Belgium, and Scotland, where it became Urban's first song to enter the Scottish and Belgian charts. The song is certified Triple Platinum in the US, Quadruple Platinum in Australia, and Platinum in Canada.

== Content ==
The song is set in the key of B minor with a main chord pattern of Gmaj7–Asus4–F♯m7–Bm and an approximate tempo of 132 beats per minute. It is about a man promising that he will defend and support a woman.

Urban said of the song's evolution as "I was working with busbee that day; we were in London. I was actually driving to the studio to work on this other song we started, and I had most of it the chorus in my head, and it felt like I had most of the song in my head — the verses just had to flesh out. I walked into the studio and played the chord progression, and he built this track really quickly, and then I could sing over the top of it". He continued and said "it was just a very quick, quick song to write, because I literally thought about Nic and I and our relationship in the beginning, and some of the things we had said all went into that song."

== Awards and nominations ==
=== Academy of Country Music Awards ===
Year	Nominee/work	Award	Result
2018	"The Fighter"	Vocal Event of the Year	Won

=== Country Music Association Awards ===
Year	Nominee/work	Award	Result
2016	"The Fighter"	Musical Event of the Year	Nominated

=== CMT Music Awards ===
Year	Nominee / work	Award	Result
2017	"The Fighter"	Collaborative Video of the Year	Won

=== Teen Choice Awards ===
Year	Nominee / work	Award	Result
2017	"The Fighter"	Choice Country Song	Nominated

== Chart performance ==
=== Before single release ===
Following the release of the album, "The Fighter" debuted at number 25 on the Hot Country Songs chart and also at number 18 on the Bubbling Under Hot 100 Singles chart, selling 25,000 copies in its first week. The following week, the song jumped to number 11 on the Hot Country Songs chart and also debuted at number 69 on the US Billboard Hot 100, selling 50,000 copies. It debuted on the Canadian Hot 100 at number 75.

In Australia, the song debuted at number 30 on the ARIA Charts, becoming Urban's seventh top 50 entry and also his third highest-charting song on the chart. For the week of 10 July 2016, the song climbed from number 27 to number 19, becoming its new peak. The song has been certified Platinum, denoting sales of over 70,000 copies in Australia. It is Urban's third top twenty hit and Underwood's second entry on the ARIA Charts and also became her highest-charting song on that chart.

=== After single release ===
The song was released as the fifth official single from Ripcord on 6 February 2017. It debuted at number 44 on the US Country Airplay chart and reached number 2, becoming Urban's 38th consecutive top ten hit which is the longest running streak in that chart's history. It became Underwood's 26th consecutive top ten hit, which is the second longest active streak of country airplay top tens. It re-entered the Hot Country Songs chart at number five, selling 45,000 copies in its week of release and peaked at number two. It also re-entered the US Billboard Hot 100 at number 53 and has reached number 38, becoming Urban's twentieth top 40 hit and Underwood's twenty first, and her first since "Something in the Water" peaked at number 24 in October 2014. On the Canada Country chart, the song has reached number 2 and peaked at number 65 on the Canadian Hot 100. The song has been certified platinum in Canada for sales of over 80,000 copies. It entered the Scottish Singles Chart at number 52, becoming Urban's first and Underwood's fourth entry on that chart following "Blown Away", "Something in the Water" and "Heartbeat". As of April 2018, the single has sold a total of 888,000 copies in the US. On August 23, 2019, the single was certified double platinum by the Recording Industry Association of America (RIAA), for combined sales and streaming units of over two million units in the United States.

== Music video ==
On 13 May 2016, following the release of the album, a video was released on Urban's YouTube account. The video, shot with Urban's own camera, shows him and his then-wife Nicole Kidman sitting in their car as the song plays on the radio. Urban serenades Kidman with the song while Kidman lip-syncs to Underwood's vocals.

Urban shared an exclusive 24-hour first look video for the song through his Vevo account. Directed by John Urbano, the video features the two singing the song in a boxing ring, intercut with various people dancing to the song in various outdoor locations at night. The video was later taken down from YouTube after the initial 24 hours.The video was re-uploaded to YouTube on 16 February 2017.

On 2 April 2017, another version of the video (featuring only the dancing sequences) was uploaded to Urban's YouTube account.

== Live performances ==
Urban and Underwood performed the song live at the 59th Grammy Awards on February 12, 2017. The duo later performed the song at the 52nd Academy of Country Music Awards on April 2, 2017. On June 7, 2017, the singers once more paired up and performed the song at the 2017 CMT Music Awards.

== Personnel ==
From Ripcord liner notes.

- busbee – bass guitar, keyboards, electric guitar, programming, producer, engineer, editing
- Dave Clauss – engineering, editing
- Serban Ghenea – mixing
- Carrie Underwood – vocals
- Keith Urban – acoustic guitar, electric guitar, mandolin, ganjo, vocals, production
- Brian David Willis – editing

== Charts ==
=== Weekly charts ===
Weekly chart performance for "The Fighter"
Chart (2016–2017)	Peak position
Australia (ARIA)	19
Belgium (Ultratip Bubbling Under Flanders)	23
Canada Hot 100 (Billboard)	65
Canada AC (Billboard)	28
Canada Hot AC (Billboard)	49
Canada Country (Billboard)	2
Scottish Singles Sales (Official Charts)	52
UK Singles Downloads (OCC)	62
UK Singles Sales (OCC)	63
US Billboard Hot 100	38
US Adult Contemporary (Billboard)	13
US Adult Pop Airplay (Billboard)	40
US Hot Country Songs (Billboard)	2
US Country Airplay (Billboard)	2

=== Year-end charts ===
Year-end chart performance for "The Fighter"
Chart (2016)	Position
Australia (ARIA)	82
Australian Artists (ARIA)	9

Chart (2017)	Position
Canada Country (Billboard)	36
US Billboard Hot 100	100
US Adult Contemporary (Billboard)	31
US Hot Country Songs (Billboard)	7
US Country Airplay (Billboard)	18

=== Decade-end charts ===
Decade-end chart performance for "The Fighter"
Chart (2010–19)	Position
US Hot Country Songs (Billboard)	43

== Certifications ==
Certifications for "The Fighter"
Region	Certification	Certified units/sales
Australia (ARIA)	4× Platinum	280,000^{‡}
Canada (Music Canada)	Platinum	80,000^{‡}
New Zealand (RMNZ)	Gold	15,000^{‡}
United States (RIAA)	3× Platinum	3,000,000^{‡}
^{‡} Sales+streaming figures based on certification alone.
