= Chen Aharoni =

Israeli pop singer

Chen Aharoni חן אהרוני
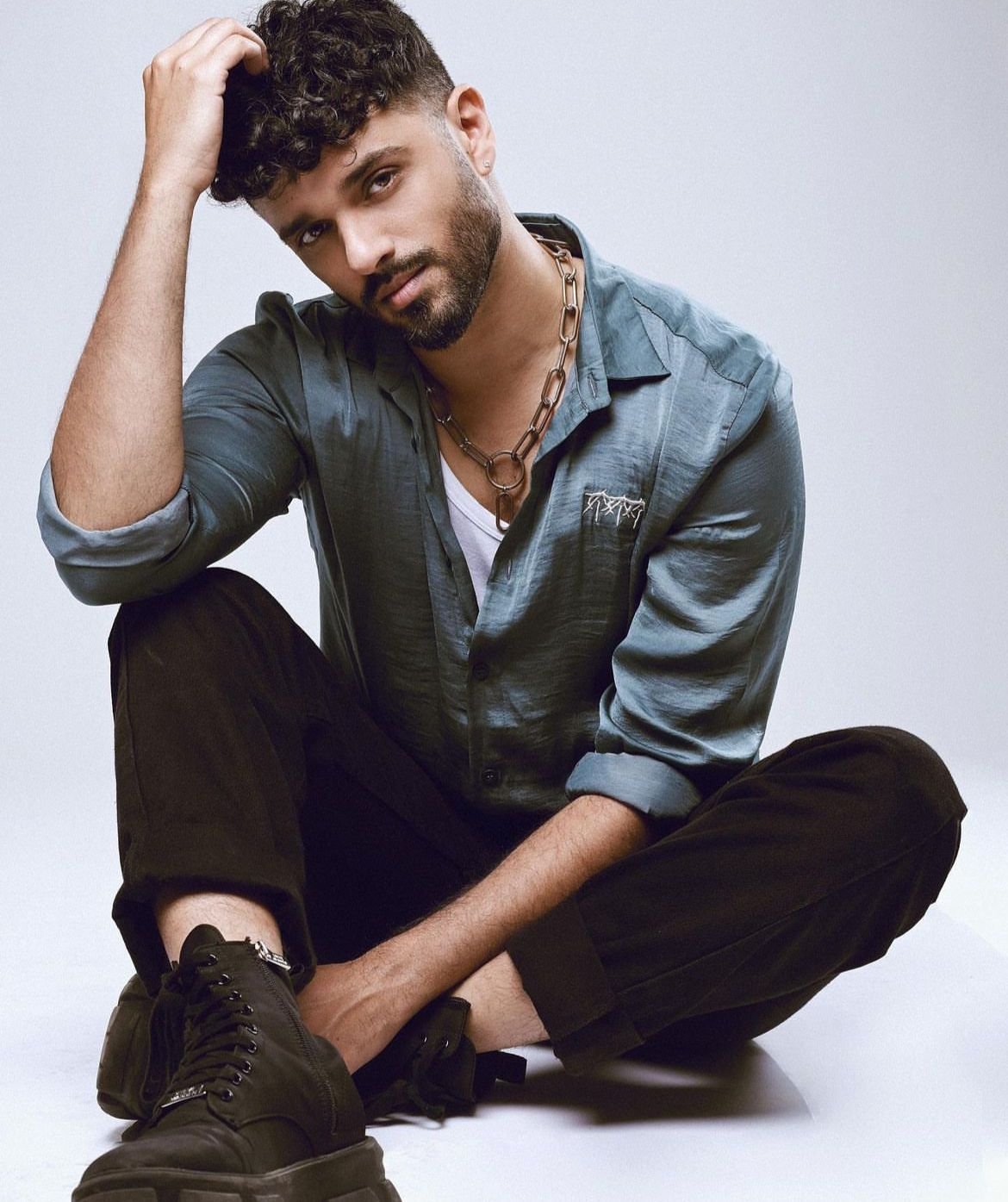

Background information
- Born: 12 April 1990 (age 36)
- Origin: Holon (Tel Aviv), Israel
- Genres: Pop
- Years active: 2007–present
- Label: NMC Music

Chen Aharoni (Hebrew: חן אהרוני; also known as Chen and also transliterated as Hen Aharoni; born in Holon, Israel on 12 April 1990) is an Israeli singer-songwriter, musician and television presenter.

== Career ==
=== Kokhav Nolad (2007) ===
He came into fame after taking part in 2007 in season 5 of Kokhav Nolad (כוכב נולד meaning A Star Is Born) structured on the international Idol series. He was eliminated after a showdown with Shlomi Bar'el before the finals. Aharoni finished 4th overall, with Bar'el ending up third. The 2007 title was won by Bo'az Ma'uda with Marina Maximilian Blumin as runner-up.

=== Solo career ===
After Kokhav Nolad, Chen Aharoni went on to sign a deal with the Israeli record label NMC Music and gaining popularity.

While Chen made musical performances throughout Israel, he started hosting TV show called "Ra'ash" (meaning noise in Hebrew) on the Israeli music channel Music 24 for 2 seasons. In August 2008 he was drafted into the Israeli army (IDF).

In 2009, he started to release singles from his forthcoming debut album. The self-titled debut album Chen Aharoni (חן אהרוני) was released on 23 December 2010 and received critical acclaim. Yedioth Ahronoth in its Entertainment Plus special supplement published on the occasion of the Hebrew New Year picked the album as one of the Top 10 best albums of the year 2010–2011 alongside names like Dudu Tasa, Berry Sakharof and Noam Rotem.

He has had many successful hits including No.1 on the Israeli singles chart with "Neshima" (נשימה) a duet with Israeli singer Esti Ginzburg. He reached No. 2 with his co-authored song "Kol ma SheRatziti" (כל מה שרציתי) and scored a second No. 1 hit in his career with "Mami" (מאמי), from the Israeli rock opera Mami.

On 26 June 2011, Chen's first single from his upcoming album was released. It was entitled "Holech Le'sham" (הולך לשם meaning: Go there) Chen's second album Nosea Rahok (נוסע רחוק) was released in October 2012 and got positive reviews. Three songs from this record have topped the 10 Israeli music charts. On 17 October 2012, Chen opened his official "Nosea Rachok Tour" that will tour all around Israel.

=== Kdam Eurovision (2011) ===
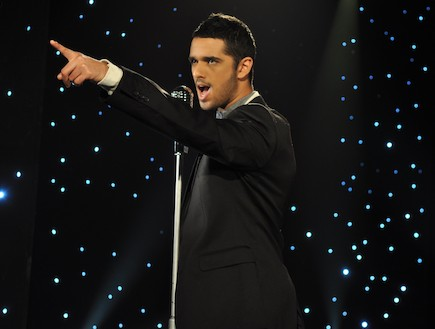
Aharoni performing during Kdam Eurovision 2011

On 8 March 2011, Chen Aharoni took part in the Kdam Eurovision selection contest finals for the Israeli entry to the Eurovision Song Contest 2011 in Düsseldorf, Germany with the song "Or" (אור meaning Light) written by Sahar Hagai and Nitzan Kaykov finishing fourth with 142 points, with Dana International winning the contest with 270 points with "Ding Dong".

=== The UK X Factor (2013) ===
In 2013 he entered the tenth series of the United Kingdom version of The X Factor. In the room auditions of X Factor, he sang Taylor Swift's "I Knew You Were Trouble", got 4 yeses and reaching the Arena stage of live auditions, where he sang Take That song "Back for Good" mixed with Cher Lloyd's "Want U Back" as back track. He got 3 yes votes from Nicole Scherzinger, Sharon Osbourne and Louis Walsh, with Gary Barlow from Take That being the only dissenting vote. Aharoni reached the bootcamp stage, where he sang "Drive By" alongside candidates Lee Lambert and Ryan Davies. All including Aharoni were sent home by their mentor Louis Walsh. He failed to make it to "judges' houses" (final 24) with Walsh claiming that he was just OK, but not sufficient to be included in his category.

Following his elimination in the UK competition, it was announced later in 2013 that Chen will be hosting the Israeli version of The Xtra Factor (in Hebrew: מבזק האקס) on an Israeli channel.

=== Crazy EP international English release (2013–2014) ===
On 14 October 2013 Chen released his first English-language single "Crazy" for Pre-order on iTunes. The song picked to No. 3 on the Israeli songs chart and officially released on 20 October 2013. The follow-up single from the EP was "Love Suicide" that topped the iTunes downloads chart for a full week.

=== HaKokhav HaBa (2017-2018) ===
Aharoni is competing in the fifth season of the show HaKokhav HaBa L'Eurovizion (meaning "The Next Star for Eurovision"), in a bid to represent Israel in 2018 Eurovision Song Contest. The qualification show started in October 2017 and hosted by Assi Azar and Rotem Sela and a judging panel composed of Asaf Amdursky, Keren Peles, Harel Skaat (2010 Israeli Eurovision entrant) and Static & Ben-El Tavori. All shows in the competition are broadcast on Channel 2 and Keshet 12 as well as online via mako.co.il.

Chen Aharoni auditioned to episode 2 of the show broadcast on 31 October 2017 with an interpretation of the Miley Cyrus song "Wrecking Ball". He got approval of all four judges and an approval rating of 94% being the second highest approval rate among the 25 candidates with only Yafit Casay exceeding him with a 95% score. Aharoni moved to the promotion round as part of final 20 contestants.

In Heat 2, broadcast on 7 and 8 January 2018, he sang "Can't Feel My Face" from The Weeknd. He again got approval of all five judges and an approval rating of 80% advancing to Heat 5 broadcast on 22 January 2018 where he was coupled with Jonathan Mergui singing "Locked Out of Heaven" from Bruno Mars again getting approval from all four judges and a 92% score advancing to the quarter finals

In the quarter finals on 4 and 7 February, he sang "Rokedet" getting approval of three of the four judges with Assaf Amdursky abstaining. However he got 71% approval advancing to the semi-final where he sang "Bang Bang" from Jessie J, Ariana Grande and Nicki Minaj on 8 and 11 February, with all four judges approving and a public vote of 86%, the second highest rate for the semi-final.

Reaching the final alongside three other finalists Jonathan Mergui, Riki Ben Ari and Netta Barzilai on 13 February 2018, he sang his own hit "Neshima" getting approval of all four judges. But his public vote was 72%, the lowest of the finalists plus he got positive endorsement from only one judge (Ben El Tavori) and was eliminated. The final was won by Netta Barzilai, who went on to represent Israel in the 2018 Eurovision Song Contest.

== In popular culture ==
- He was chosen for an anti-drug youth public awareness campaign by הרשות הלאומית למלחמה בסמים ואלכוהול.
- For two seasons, he hosted "Ra'ash" (meaning noise in Hebrew), a TV show on the Israeli music channel Music 24.
- He also took part in the Israeli version of the reality series Treasure Island ("אי המטמון").
- Aharoni was picked as one of the Top 100 stars in Israel in the celebrity and lifestyle magazine Top 1 (in Hebrew ראש1). He was also picked in the Top 20 in Israeli daily Yedioth Ahronoth listing.

== Personal life ==
On 22 June 2011 Chen Aharoni finished his military service in the Israeli Army (IDF) after being drafted in August 2008. During his military service, he served in the Armored Corps as injuries coordinator and instructor at a medical complex in Tel HaShomer. He also took part in the annual festival of the Friends of the Israel Defense Forces which is held in the Yarkon Park in Tel Aviv. He came out as pansexual on the first day of 2019.

== Discography ==
=== Albums ===
==== 2010: Chen Aharoni (חן אהרוני) ====
Chen Aharoni חן אהרוני

Studio album by Chen Aharoni
- Released: (Israel) 2010
- Recorded: 2009–2010
- Genre: Pop

Chen Aharoni chronology
| Chen Aharoni חן אהרוני (2010) | Nosea Rahok (2012) |

Singles from Chen Aharoni
- 1. "Ba'Rekhov" Released: 2009; 2. "Neshima (with Esti Ginzburg)" Released: 2010; 3. ""Boi boi"" Released: 2010; 4. "La'avor Et HaPakhad" Released: 2010; 5. "Kol Ma SheRatziti" Released: 2010

Chen Aharoni is the debut self-titled album of Israeli singer Chen Aharoni released in 2010. A highly successful album for the participant in the Israeli reality show Kokhav Nolad, five singles were released from the album concerned, one of them, namely "Neshima" a song with Esti Ginzburg making it to the top of the Israeli Singles Chart and another "Kol ma SheRatziti" making it to #2 in the same charts.

Track list

| Track No. | Transliterated title | Title in Hebrew | Length |
|---|---|---|---|
| 1. | Im At Lo Ohevet | אם את לא אוהבת | 2:55 |
| 2. | BaRekhov (3:05) | ברחוב | 3:05 |
| 3. | Shaquf | שקוף | 3:40 |
| 4. | Tafur 'Aleia | תפור עליה | 3:28 |
| 5. | Neshima (with Esti Ginzburg) | נשימה (עם אסתי גינזבורג) | 3:21 |
| 6. | Kol Ma SheRatziti | כל מה שרציתי | 3:24 |
| 7. | Boi Boi | בואי בואי | 3:01 |
| 8. | La'avor Et HaPakhad | לעבור את הפחד | 3:02 |
| 9. | VeNishkakh Et Hakol | ונשכח את הכל | 3:30 |
| 10. | Mitbager | מתבגר | 3:37 |

Bonus

| Track No. | Transliterated title | Title in Hebrew | Length |
|---|---|---|---|
| 11. | Neshima (Remix) | נשימה (Remix) | 5:01 |

Singles from the album

- 2009: "Ba'Rekhov" (ברחוב – In the street) – by Sahar kHagai and Nitzan Kaykov (#7)
- 2010: "Neshima" (with Esti Ginzburg) (נשימה (עם אסתי גינזבורג) – Breathing) – by Sahar Hagai and Nitzan Kaykov (#1)
- 2010: "Boi boi" (בואי בואי – Come come) – by Sahar kHagai and Nitzan Kaykov
- 2010: "La'avor Et HaPakhad" (לעבור את הפחד – To get through the fear) – by Tom Rahav and Ran Haros (#15)
- 2010: "Kol Ma SheRatziti" (כל מה שרציתי – All I ever wanted) – by Chen Aharoni and Meital Patash-Cohen (#2)

==== 2012: Nosea Rahok (נוסע רחוק) ====
Nosea Rahok נוסע רחוק

Studio album by Chen Aharoni
- Released: (Israel) October 2012
- Recorded: 2011–2012
- Genre: Pop

Chen Aharoni chronology
| Chen Aharoni (2010) | Nosea Rahok נוסע רחוק (2012) |

Singles from Nose'a Rakhoq
- 1. "Holekh Le'Sham" Released: 2011; 2. "Mami" Released: 2011; 3. "Nose'a Rakhoq" Released: 2011; 4. "Mashehu Khaser" Released: 2012; 5. "Khamesh Daqot" Released: 2012

Nosea Rahok (Hebrew: נוסע רחוק, lit. 'Traveling Far Away') is the second studio album of Israeli singer Chen Aharoni released in October 2012. A successful album for the participant in the Israeli reality show Kokhav Nolad, five singles were released from the album concerned, one of them, namely "Mami" reached the top of the Israeli Singles Chart.

Track list

| Track No. | Transliterated title | Title in Hebrew | English Unofficial Translation | Length |
|---|---|---|---|---|
| 1. | Nose'a Rakhoq | נוסע רחוק | Traveling Far Away | 3:36 |
| 2. | Mami | מאמי | Sweetie | 3:00 |
| 3. | Mashehu Khaser | משהו חסר | Something Is Missing | 3:10 |
| 4. | Kol Layla | כל לילה | Every Night | 3:17 |
| 5. | Asur | אסור | Forbidden | 3:17 |
| 6. | Khamesh Daqot | חמש דקות | Five Minutes | 3:35 |
| 7. | Shev BeSheqet' Yeled | שב בשקט ילד | Sit quiet child | |
| 8. | Holekh Le'Sham | הולך לשם | Going There | 3:17 |

Bonus

| Track No. | Transliterated title | Title in Hebrew | English Translation | Length |
| 9. | Where Have You Been | N/A | N/A | 4:01 |
| 10. | Mami (remix) | (מאמי (רמיקס | Sweetie (remix) | 4:19 |

Singles from the album

Five of the tracks were released as singles, with peak positions in Israel in parentheses).

- 2011: "Holekh Le'Sham" (Holech Le'sham – Go there)
- 2011: "Mami" (מאמי –Sweetie) (#1)
- 2011: "Nose'a Rakhoq" (נוסע רחוק – Traveling far away) (#5)
- 2012: "Mashehu Khaser" (משהו חסר – Something missing)
- 2012: "Khamesh Daqot" (חמש דקות – Five minutes) (#7)

=== EPs ===
- 2014: Crazy EP

=== Singles ===
| Year | Song | Song title (in Hebrew) | English Translation | Writers | ISR | Album |
|---|---|---|---|---|---|---|
| 2009 | "Ba'Rehov" | ברחוב | In the street | Sahar Hagai and Nitzan Kaikov | 7 | Chen Aharoni |
| 2010 | "Neshima" (with Esti Ginzburg) | נשימה (עם אסתי גינזבורג) | Breathing | Sahar Hagai and Nitzan Kaikov | 1 | Chen Aharoni |
| 2010 | "Boee boee" | בואי בואי | Come come | Sahar Hagai and Nitzan Kaikov | - | Chen Aharoni |
| 2010 | "LaAvor Et HaPahad" | לעבור את הפחד | To move on the fear | Tom Rahav and Ran Haros | 15 | Chen Aharoni |
| 2010 | "Kol ma SheRatziti" | כל מה שרציתי | All I ever wanted | Chen Aharoni and Meital Patash-Cohen | 2 | Chen Aharoni |
| 2011 | "Or" | אור | Light | Sahar Hagai and Nitzan Kaikov | - | Non-album release |
| 2011 | "Holech Le'sham" | הולך לשם | Go there | | - | Nosea Rahok (נוסע רחוק) |
| 2011 | "Mami" | מאמי | Sweetie | | 1 | Nosea Rahok (נוסע רחוק) |
| 2011 | "Nosea Rahok" | נוסע רחוק | Driving Far | DANGO and Chen Aharoni | 5 | Nosea Rahok (נוסע רחוק) |
| 2012 | "Masheu Haser" | משהו חסר | Something is missing | Eyal Shachar | - | Nosea Rahok (נוסע רחוק) |
| 2012 | "5 Dakot" | חמש דקות | 5 minutes | Johnny Goldstein | 7 | Nosea Rahok (נוסע רחוק) |
| 2013 | "Crazy" | משוגע | Crazy | Chen Aharoni and Roby Fayer | 13 | Crazy EP |
| 2014 | "Love Suicide" | | Love Suicide | Dolem Ram & Chen Aharoni & Roby Fayer | 13 | Crazy EP |
| 2015 | "Zarim" | זרים | Strangers | Chen Aharoni | 11 | |
| 2015 | "Notenet Li Bait" | נותנת לי בית | Giving me home | Chen Aharoni | 2 | |
