= Break on Me =

Single by Keith Urban

from the album Ripcord
- Released: 23 October 2015
- Recorded: 2015
- Genre: Country pop
- Length: 3:29
- Label: Hit Red; Capitol Nashville
- Songwriters: Ross Copperman; Jon Nite
- Producers: Keith Urban; Nathan Chapman

Keith Urban singles chronology
"John Cougar, John Deere, John 3:16" (2015)	"Break on Me" (2015)	"Wasted Time" (2016)

"Break on Me" (stylized as "Break on Me.") is a song written by Ross Copperman and Jon Nite and recorded by Australian country music singer Keith Urban. It was released on 23 October 2015 as the second single from Urban's 2016 album Ripcord. This ballad with its prominent bassline (played by Tal Wilkenfeld) was co-produced by Urban along with Nathan Chapman and has been deemed a stylistic counterpoint to its funky predecessor "John Cougar, John Deere, John 3:16". The song is also the second of his career to not have an accompanying music video, after 2010's "I'm In".

== Critical reception ==
Billy Dukes of Taste of Country complimented both the "nuanced" songwriting and Urban's "understated and accessible" delivery of the lyrics, noting that his approach elevates the song to something special.

== Chart performance ==
"Break on Me" was the most-added song at country radio for the week of 26 October 2015 with 67 stations, according to radio monitoring organization Mediabase. It debuted at number 54 on the Billboard Country Airplay chart on the week of 7 November 2015. The following week, the song debuted at number 24 on the US Hot Country Songs chart, selling 22,000 copies in its first week. On the Country Airplay chart for the week of 12 March 2016, "Break on Me" reached it peak at number one on the chart, making for the biggest jump to number one since Rascal Flatts' "Here Comes Goodbye" in April 2009, also ascended from number six to number one. As of May 2016, the song has sold 265,000 copies in the US. On February 24, 2017, the single was certified gold by the Recording Industry Association of America (RIAA) for combined sales and streaming data of over 500,000 units in the United States.

== Charts ==
=== Weekly charts ===
Chart (2015–2016)	Peak position
Australia (ARIA)	106
Canada (Canadian Hot 100)	61
Canada Country (Billboard)	1
US Billboard Hot 100	54
US Country Airplay (Billboard)	1
US Hot Country Songs (Billboard)	6

=== Year end charts ===
Chart (2016)	Position
US Country Airplay (Billboard)	47
US Hot Country Songs (Billboard)	48

== Certifications ==
Region	Certification	Certified units/sales
United States (RIAA)	Gold	500,000^{‡}
^{‡} Sales+streaming figures based on certification alone.

== Release history ==
Country	Date	Format	Label	Ref.
Worldwide	23 October 2015	Digital download	Hit Red; Capitol Nashville	
United States	26 October 2015	Country radio	Hit Red; Capitol Nashville	
