= Go In, Go Hard =

Single by Angel featuring Wretch 32

from the album About Time
- Released: 18 March 2012
- Recorded: 2011
- Genre: R&B, hip hop, grime
- Length: 3:43
- Label: Universal Island Records
- Songwriter(s): Sirach Charles, James Abrahart, Ryan Williamson, Jermaine Scott

Angel singles chronology
"Go In, Go Hard" (2012)	"Wonderful" (2012)

Wretch 32 singles chronology
"Stylechanger" (2012)	"Go In, Go Hard" (2012)	"Hush Little Baby" (2012)

"Go In, Go Hard" is a song by British musician Angel featuring vocals from English rapper Wretch 32. It was released on 18 March 2012 as the lead single from his debut studio album About Time (2013). The song peaked at number 41 on the UK Singles Chart and number 14 on the UK R&B Chart.

== Music video ==
A music video to accompany the release of "Go In, Go Hard" was first released onto YouTube on 2 February 2012 at a total length of three minutes and forty-eight seconds.

== Track listing ==
Digital Download
No.	Title	Length
1.	"Go In, Go Hard"	3:43
2.	"Go In, Go Hard" (CASSETTi Remix)	3:57
3.	"Go In, Go Hard" (MDM Reggae Remix)	3:53
4.	"Ride Out" (feat. Sneakbo)	4:01

== Chart performance ==
Chart (2012)	Peak position
UK Singles (OCC)	41
UK Hip Hop/R&B (OCC)	14

== Release history ==
Country	Release date	Format	Label
United Kingdom	18 March 2012	Digital download	Universal Island Records
