= Lights On (Wiley song) =

Single by Wiley featuring Angel and Tinchy Stryder

from the album The Ascent
- Released: 7 June 2013
- Genre: Grime, dance
- Length: 3:25
- Label: Warner Music
- Songwriters: Richard Cowie, Sirach Charles, Kwasi Danquah
- Producers: Parallelm, Angel

Wiley singles chronology
"They Got It Wrong" (2013)	"Lights On" (2013)	"Flying" (2013)

Angel singles chronology
"The World" (2013)	"Lights On" (2013)	"T.I.N.A." (2014)

Tinchy Stryder singles chronology
"Help Me" (2012)	"Lights On" (2013)	"Misunderstood" (2014)

"Lights On" is a single from British grime artist Wiley, featuring vocals from Angel and Tinchy Stryder. It was released as the fourth single from his ninth studio album The Ascent on 7 June 2013 for digital download in the United Kingdom. The song was written by Richard Cowie, Sirach Charles, Kwasi Danquah and produced by Parallel and Angel.

== Music video ==
A music video to accompany the release of "Lights On" was first released onto YouTube on 30 April 2013 at a total length of three minutes and fifty-three seconds. The video was directed by Rohan Blair Mangat. Daisy Ridley appears in the video.

== Track listings ==
Digital download
No.	Title	Length
1.	"Lights On" (feat. Angel & Tinchy Stryder) (Radio Mix)	3:34
2.	"Lights On" (feat. Angel & Tinchy Stryder)	3:25
3.	"Lights On" (feat. Angel & Tinchy Stryder) (Benga I'm Just Tryna Live Mix)	4:04
4.	"Lights On" (feat. Angel & Tinchy Stryder) (Bot Remix)	3:35
5.	"Lights On" (feat. Angel & Tinchy Stryder) (Sticky Remix)	5:04
6.	"Lights On" (feat. Angel & Tinchy Stryder) (Nucleus Brown Remix)	5:02

== Credits and personnel ==
- Vocals – Wiley, Angel, Tinchy Stryder
- Lyrics – Richard Cowie, Sirach Charles, Kwasi Danquah
- Producer – Parallelm, Angel
- Label: Warner Music

== Charts ==
Chart (2013)	Peak position
Ireland (IRMA)	47
Scotland Singles (OCC)	8
UK Dance (OCC)	3
UK Singles (OCC)	9

== Release history ==
Country	Date	Format	Label
United Kingdom	7 June 2013	Digital download	Warner Music
