= John Cougar, John Deere, John 3:16 =

Single by Keith Urban

from the album Ripcord
- Released: 9 June 2015
- Recorded: 2015
- Studio: Lime Orchard Studios (Los Angeles, CA)
- Genre: Country pop
- Length: 3:42
- Label: Hit Red; Capitol Nashville
- Songwriters: Shane McAnally; Ross Copperman; Josh Osborne
- Producers: Keith Urban; Dann Huff

Keith Urban singles chronology
"Raise 'Em Up" (2015)	"John Cougar, John Deere, John 3:16" (2015)	"Break on Me" (2015)

"John Cougar, John Deere, John 3:16" is a song written by Shane McAnally, Ross Copperman, and Josh Osborne and recorded by Australian country music singer Keith Urban. It was released on June 9, 2015 as the first single from Urban's 2016 album Ripcord. The song has a slow 1970s funk vibe that carries distinct drum loops and several time changes, with production from Urban and longtime co-producer Dann Huff. The song has received positive reviews from music critics who praised the production and lyrics, as well as Urban's return to traditional country with a brand-new sound.

== Background ==
Urban debuted the song at the Country Radio Seminar in Nashville, Tennessee in February 2015. Urban told The Boot that it "was sent to me a few months ago by one of the songwriters, and I loved it immediately". Lyrically, the song uses several name-drops to illustrate the narrator's influences in life, culminating in "I learned everything I needed to know from John Cougar, John Deere, John 3:16." Musically, it features a "slowed, almost '70s funk vibe with distinct drum loops and several time changes". Urban recorded the song at Blackbird Studios in Nashville, and co-produced it with longtime producer Dann Huff. Urban told Nash Country Weekly that he was having difficulty creating a suitable vocal track until he took a bass guitar from the studio wall and played a bass line which he had originally intended to replace with one from a session musician, but ultimately left in the final recording.

== Release ==
The song was released to radio on 9 June 2015, and Urban performed it the next day on the CMT Music Awards.

== Critical reception ==
Billy Dukes of Taste of Country reviewed the song with favor, saying that Keith Urban "returns to more traditional country themes while continuing to push his sound in new directions" and that it "has an everyman quality to it that heightens the song’s sharpness. It’s a good, mellow groove that won’t soon get old." Tammy Ragusa of Nash Country Weekly gave the song an A− grade, saying that it was "one of the catchiest, most infectious songs of the summer" and "Dann Huff lets the song's arrangement ebb and flow". She also praised the lyrics, saying "there is some depth and a message."

The song was nominated for Best Country Solo Performance at the 58th Annual Grammy Awards but lost to Chris Stapleton's "Traveller".

== Chart performance ==
"John Cougar, John Deere, John 3:16" debuted at number 47 on the US Hot Country Songs chart, on the week before its official release, and reached its peak at number 24 the following week. The song also debuted on the US Country Airplay chart at number 26, and at number seven on the Country Digital Songs chart selling 36,000 copies. The song peaked at number two on the US Hot Country Songs chart on the week of September 19, 2015, and number two on the US Country Airplay chart a week later. The song also reached its peak at number 40 on the US Billboard Hot 100 on the week of October 10, 2015, becoming Urban's eighteenth top 40 hit on that chart. As of February 2016, the song has sold 663,000 copies in the US. On October 30, 2024, the single was certified 2× platinum by the Recording Industry Association of America (RIAA) for combined sales and streaming data of over two million units in the United States.

== Music video ==
The music video was directed by Shane Drake and premiered in August 2015.

== Personnel ==
From Ripcord liner notes.

Musicians

- Matt Chamberlain – drums, programming
- Ross Copperman – gang vocals
- Jerry Flowers – background vocals
- Dann Huff – acoustic guitar, gang vocals
- Charlie Judge – keyboards
- Andy Snyder – gang vocals
- Russell Terrell – background vocals
- Keith Urban – acoustic guitar, bass guitar, electric guitar, vocals
- Jonathan Yudkin – violin

Technical

- Joe Baldridge – engineering
- Eric Lijestrand – acoustic guitar overdubs
- Serban Ghenea – mixing
- John Hanes – engineering
- Dann Huff – production, engineering
- Keith Urban – production

== Charts ==
=== Weekly charts ===
Chart (2015)	Peak position
Canada Hot 100 (Billboard)	35
Canada Country (Billboard)	1
US Billboard Hot 100	40
US Country Airplay (Billboard)	2
US Hot Country Songs (Billboard)	2

=== Year-end charts ===
Chart (2015)	Position
Canada (Canadian Hot 100)	90
US Country Airplay (Billboard)	25
US Hot Country Songs (Billboard)	9

== Certifications ==
Region	Certification	Certified units/sales
Australia (ARIA)	Gold	35,000^{‡}
Canada (Music Canada)	Platinum	80,000^{‡}
United States (RIAA)	2× Platinum	2,000,000^{‡}
^{‡} Sales+streaming figures based on certification alone.
