= Wonderful (Angel song) =

Single by Angel

from the album About Time
- Released: 15 July 2012
- Recorded: 2012
- Length: 3:30
- Label: Universal Island Records
- Songwriter(s): Sirach Charles, Kassa Alexander, Victoria Akintola, Parker Ighile, Kyle Abrahams, Kyle "Logik" Burns, Dion Wardle
- Producer(s): Parker Ighile & James x Parallel

Angel singles chronology
"Go In, Go Hard" (2012)	"Wonderful" (2012)	"Time After Time" (2012)

"Wonderful" is a song by British musician Angel. It was first released in the United Kingdom on 15 July 2012 as the second single from his debut studio album About Time (2013), debuting at number twenty for the week ending 28 July, reaching a peak of number nine several weeks later.

== Music video ==
A music video to accompany the release of "Wonderful" was first released onto YouTube on 13 June 2012 at a total length of three minutes and forty-seven seconds.

== Chart performance ==
"Wonderful" first charted on the UK Singles Chart at number twenty on the chart week ending 22 July, having sold 14,032 copies in its first week. Having remained at number twenty on its second charting week, the track advanced a single place to number nineteen for the week of 11 August and a further seven places to number twelve the following week. On its sixth charting week, 26 August, "Wonderful" entered the top 10 at number nine. Wonderful Remained in the UK top 10 for a further week and has since sold over 250,000 copies.

== Track listing ==
Digital Download
No.	Title	Length
1.	"Wonderful"	3:30
2.	"Wonderful" (Dexcell Remix)	5:39
3.	"Wonderful" (Manhattan Clique Remix)	5:14
4.	"How Can I Lose" (featuring Chip)	3:55

== Charts ==
=== Weekly charts ===
Chart (2012)	Peak position
Ireland (IRMA)	74
UK Hip Hop/R&B (OCC)	1
UK Singles (OCC)	9
Scotland (OCC)	15

=== Year-end charts ===
Chart (2012)	Position
UK Singles (OCC)	106

== Certifications ==
Region	Certification	Certified units/sales
United Kingdom (BPI)	Silver	200,000^{*}
^{*} Sales figures based on certification alone.

== Release history ==
Country	Release date	Format	Label
United Kingdom	15 July 2012	Digital download	Universal Island Records
