= About Time (Angel album) =

Studio album by Angel
- Released: 12 April 2013
- Recorded: 2010–2013
- Genre: R&B, hip hop, grime
- Length: 58:55
- Label: Universal Republic, Island
- Producer: Angel (exec.), Parker Ighile, Midi Mafia, Dion Wardle, Tommy Hittz, Kyle James

Singles from About Time
- 1. "Julie" Released: 30 May 2010; 2. "Go In, Go Hard" Released: 18 March 2012; 3. "Wonderful" Released: 15 July 2012; 4. "Time After Time" Released: 29 November 2012; 5. "The World" Released: 5 April 2013; 6. "Rocket Love" Released: 15 April 2013

About Time is the debut solo studio album released by British R&B singer Angel. The album was released in Ireland on 12 April 2013 and in the UK on 15 April via Island and Universal Republic.

== Background ==
The release of the album was announced in January 2013, a month after the release of the single "Time After Time". On 16 March 2013, the release date of 15 April 2013 was confirmed via Facebook. The album includes guest appearances from the likes of British rapper Wretch 32, British DJ Trevor Nelson, American rapper Notorious B.I.G., Finnish band H.I.M, rapper Wizkid, and British soul singer Shakka. The album produced five singles: including four before the release, and one after. The track "Julie", released as Angel's debut single and initially due to appear on the album, was cut in favour of new material. The album debuted at #33 on the UK Albums Chart. A total of fifteen non-album tracks were released to the iTunes Store prior to the album's release, contained within three EPs, and B-sides to the album's singles.

== Singles ==
- "Julie" was initially released as the album's lead single on 30 May 2010, was eventually cut from the album in favour of new material. The single was released on Parallel records prior to Angel singing with Universal Island. The music video for the track is available to download from the iTunes Store.
- "Go In, Go Hard", featuring British rapper Wretch 32, was released as the album's lead single on 18 March 2012, appearing only on the deluxe edition, peaking at #41 on the UK Singles Chart and #14 in the UK R&B Chart. The single features the B-side "Ride Out", featuring rapper Sneakbo, which also appears as a bonus track on the deluxe edition of the album. A music video was also filmed for "Ride Out", premiering seven days after "Go In, Go Hard".
- "Wonderful" was released as the album's second single on 15 July 2012, achieving better success, peaking at #9 on the UK Singles Chart. The single features the B-side "How Can I Lose" featuring British rapper Chip. A music video was filmed for the B-side, featuring a guest appearance from Chip.
- "Time After Time" was released as the album's third single on 29 November 2012, again peaking at number at #41 on the UK Singles Chart. The single features the B-side "Ride or Die", featuring former X Factor contestant and British rapper Misha B. "Ride or Die" had a music video filmed for it, directed by actor and rapper Adam Deacon, who also co-stars in the video.
- "The World" was released as the album's fourth single on 5 April 2013. The music video for the track premiered on 7 February 2013. It failed to chart within the top 40 of the UK Singles Chart and peaked at number 73, becoming the album's and Angel's least-successful single. It was Angel's first single not to feature a B-side.
- "Rocket Love" was released as a promotional single on 15 April 2013, via the iTunes Store, becoming the first promotional single from the album. A music video was filmed for the track, being the only track on the album not to be produced by Parallel or Peter Ighile, and instead being produced by Midi Mafia.
- Music videos for the tracks "Paid in Full", "More Fire", "Blown Away" and "Secrets" was also filmed and released, premiering on 17 April, 20 April, 3 May and 15 May respectively, with each of the tracks being promoted as the iTunes Store download of the day.

== Track listing ==
Standard edition
| No. | Title | Writer(s) | Producer(s) | Length |
|---|---|---|---|---|
| 1. | "1st Seven O'Ten" (featuring George the Poet) | George Mpanga | Parallel | 0:46 |
| 2. | "Paid in Full" (featuring H.I.M and The Notorious B.I.G.) | Sirach Charles, Kassa Alexander, Victoria Akintola, Peter Ighile | Peter Ighile | 4:21 |
| 3. | "Blown Away" (featuring Wizkid) | Charles, Alexander, Ayodeji Balogun | Parallel | 3:47 |
| 4. | "The World" | Charles, Alexander, Ighile, Dion Wardle, Michael Riley | Peter Ighile, Parallel | 3:43 |
| 5. | "Vegas" | Charles, Alexander | Parallel | 3:00 |
| 6. | "Wonderful" | Charles, Alexander, Akintola, Ighile, Wardle, Kyle Abrahams | Parker & James, Parallel | 4:24 |
| 7. | "Victory" | Charles, Alexander, Akintola, Ighile | Peter Ighile | 3:55 |
| 8. | "More Fire" (featuring Shakka) | Charles, Alexander, Akintola, Shakka Philips | Parallel | 4:05 |
| 9. | "Circles in Squares" | Charles, Alexander | Parallel | 3:56 |
| 10. | "Secrets" (featuring Wretch 32) | Charles, Alexander, Akintola, Ighile, Kyle James, Jermaine Scott | Peter Ighile, Parallel | 4:29 |
| 11. | "Time After Time" (featuring Trevor Nelson and Vickytola) | Charles, Alexander, Tommy Hittz, Theron Thomas, Timothy Thomas, James Abrahart | Tommy Hittz, Parallel | 4:31 |
| 12. | "Go" | Charles, Alexander, Akintola | Parallel | 4:32 |
| 13. | "Sober" (featuring Chasing Grace) | Charles, Alexander, Akintola, Ighile | Peter Ighile, Parallel, Kyle James | 4:02 |
| 14. | "Fourteen Four 13'" (starring George the Poet) | George Mpanga | Parallel | 1:16 |
| 15. | "Rocket Love" | Waynne Nugent, Kevin Risto, Christopher Breaux, Lamont Neuble, Tim Stewart, Charlie Gambetta | Dirty Swift, Bruce Waynne | 4:05 |
| Total length: | | | | 49:39 |

Deluxe edition bonus tracks
| No. | Title | Writer(s) | Producer(s) | Length |
|---|---|---|---|---|
| 16. | "Impossible To Kill" | James Fauntleroy | Parallel | 3:38 |
| 17. | "Day Dun" | Charles | Parallel | 3:59 |
| 18. | "Why" (featuring George the Poet) | Charles, Mpanga | Parallel | 4:09 |

iTunes Store deluxe edition bonus content
| No. | Title | Length |
|---|---|---|
| 19. | "Wonderful" (Music video) | 3:46 |
| 20. | "The World" (Music video) | 3:51 |
| 21. | "Ride Out" (Music video) | 4:15 |
| 22. | "Go In, Go Hard" (Music video) | 3:47 |

Physical deluxe edition bonus disc
| No. | Title | Writer(s) | Producer(s) | Length |
|---|---|---|---|---|
| 1. | "Ride Out" (featuring Sneakbo) | Charles, Alexander, Akintola, Agassi Odusina | Parallel | 4:15 |
| 2. | "Go In, Go Hard" (featuring Wretch 32) | Charles, James Abrahart, Ryan Williamson, Scott | Parallel | 3:47 |
| 3. | "Handle It" | | | 2:57 |
| 4. | "We Know Better" | | | 3:53 |
| 5. | "Tough Got Goin'" (featuring Cherise) | Charles, Cherise Roberts | Parker & James | 5:02 |
| 6. | "Just Sayin'" | Charles | Parallel | 3:12 |

Australian edition
| No. | Title | Writer(s) | Producer(s) | Length |
|---|---|---|---|---|
| 1. | "1st Seven O'Ten" (featuring George the Poet) | George Mpanga | Parallel | 0:46 |
| 2. | "Wonderful" | Charles, Alexander, Akintola, Ighile, Abrahams, Wardle | Parker & James, Parallel | 4:24 |
| 3. | "More Fire" (featuring Shakka) | Charles, Alexander, Akintola, Philips | Parallel | 4:05 |
| 4. | "Victory" | Charles, Alexander, Akintola, Ighile | Parker Ighile | 3:55 |
| 5. | "Vegas" | Charles, Alexander | Parallel | 3:00 |
| 6. | "Secrets" (featuring Wretch 32) | Charles, Alexander, Akintola, Ighile, James, Scott | Peter Ighile, Parallel | 4:29 |
| 7. | "Get Money" | Charles, Alexander | Parallel | 3:22 |
| 8. | "Day Dun" | Charles | Parallel | 3:59 |
| 9. | "Why" (featuring George the Poet) | Charles, Mpanga | Parallel | 4:09 |
| 10. | "Rocket Love" | Nugent, Risto, Breaux, Neuble, Stewart, Gambetta | Dirty Swift, Bruce Waynne | 4:05 |
| 11. | "Time After Time" (featuring Trevor Nelson and Vickytola) | Charles, Alexander, Hittz, Thomas, Thomas, Abrahart | Tommy Hittz, Parallel | 4:31 |
| 12. | "Impossible To Kill" | Charles, Alexander, Akintola | Parallel | 3:38 |
| 13. | "Sober" (featuring Chasing Grace) | Charles, Alexander, Akintola, Ighile | Peter Ighile, Parallel, Kyle James | 4:02 |
| 14. | "Go In, Go Hard" (featuring Wretch 32) | Charles, Abrahart, Williamson, Scott | Parallel | 3:47 |
| 15. | "Ride Out" (featuring Sneakbo) | Charles, Alexander, Akintola, Odusina | Parallel | 4:15 |
| 16. | "How Can I Lose" (featuring Chip) | Charles, Jahmaal Fyffe | Parallel | 3:55 |

B-sides and additional tracks
| No. | Title | Writer(s) | Producer(s) | Length |
|---|---|---|---|---|
| 1. | "Ride or Die" (featuring Misha B) | Sirach Charles, Kassa Alexander, Misha Bryan | Parallel | 3:19 |
| 2. | "Fire" | Sirach Charles | Parallel | 2:59 |
| 3. | "Mirror" | | | 4:17 |
| 4. | "How Can I Lose" (featuring Chip) | Sirach Charles, Jahmaal Fyffe | Parallel | 3:55 |
| 5. | "Let Me In" | Sirach Charles | Parallel | 2:50 |
| 6. | "O2" (featuring Tinchy Stryder, A-Star and Sloth) | Sirach Charles, Kwasi Danquah, Daniel Owens, Akelle Charles | David Nkumrah | 6:10 |
| 7. | "Set It Off" | Sirach Charles, Nathan Thompson | Parallel | 3:31 |
| 8. | "Knock Me Out" | Sirach Charles | Parallel | 4:00 |
| 9. | "Gleamin'" (featuring Maxsta and Wiley) | Sirach Charles, Kassa Alexander, Richard Cowie, Ian Koromah | Parallel | 4:29 |
| 10. | "Raining Girls" (featuring Temps) | Sirach Charles, Kassa Alexander, Stacey David | Parallel | 4:50 |
| 11. | "Popstar" (featuring Giggs) | Sirach Charles, Kassa Alexander, Peter Ighile, Kyle Abrahams, Nathan Thompson, Dion Wardle | Peter Ighile, Parallel | 4:10 |
| 12. | "Bottles" (featuring Scorcher and G Frsh) | Sirach Charles, Kassa Alexander, Gordon Egwu, Tayo Jarrett | Parallel | 4:01 |
| 13. | "Hard" | Sirach Charles, Kassa Alexander | Parallel | 3:36 |
| 14. | "Ladder" (featuring Mark Asari and Cleo Sol) | Sirach Charles, Kassa Alexander, Mark Asari, Cleo Nikolic | Parallel | 4:03 |
| 15. | "Julie" | | | 4:02 |

== Chart ==
| Chart (2013) | Peak position |
|---|---|
| UK Albums Chart | 33 |

== Release history ==
| Regions | Dates | Format(s) | Label(s) |
|---|---|---|---|
| Ireland | 12 April 2013 | CD, High Grade Edition CD, digital download | Island, Universal Republic |
| United Kingdom | 15 April 2013 | CD, High Grade Edition CD, digital download | Island, Universal Republic |
