= Time After Time (Angel song) =

Single by Angel

from the album About Time
- B-side: "Ride or Die"
- Released: 29 November 2012
- Recorded: 2012
- Genre: R&B
- Length: 3:33
- Label: Universal Island Records
- Songwriter(s): Sirach Charles, Alexander, Tommy Hittz, Theron Thomas, Timothy Thomas, James Abrahart

Angel singles chronology
| "Wonderful" (2012) | "Time After Time" (2012) | "The World" (2013) |

"Time After Time" is a song by British singer-songwriter Angel. It was first released in the United Kingdom on 29 November 2012 as the third single from his debut studio album About Time (2013). The song has peaked to number 41 on the UK Singles Chart and number 4 on the UK R&B Chart.

== Music video ==
A music video to accompany the release of "Time After Time" was first released onto YouTube on 17 October 2012 at a total length of three minutes and forty-four seconds.

== Track listing ==
Digital Download
| No. | Title | Length |
|---|---|---|
| 1. | "Time After Time" | 3:33 |
| 2. | "Time After Time" (Jamie Grind Remix) | 3:42 |
| 3. | "Time After Time" (Instrumental) | 3:31 |
| 4. | "Ride or Die" (feat. Misha B) | 3:19 |

== Chart performance ==
| Chart (2012) | Peak position |
|---|---|
| UK Singles (Official Charts Company) | 41 |
| UK Hip Hop/R&B (OCC) | 4 |

== Release history ==
| Country | Release date | Format | Label |
|---|---|---|---|
| United Kingdom | 29 November 2012 | Digital download | Universal Island Records |
