= K-KOV =

Israeli musical artist

Nitzan (K-KOV) Kaikov
- Born: 11 October 1987 (age 38)
- Origin: Bat Yam, Israel
- Genres: Pop
- Occupations: Music producer, songwriter
- Years active: 2005 – present

Nitzan Kaikov (Hebrew: ניצן קייקוב; born 11 October 1987), also known as K-KOV, is an Israeli songwriter and music producer. He is currently based in Los Angeles.

== Early life ==
Refael Nitzan Kaikov, also known as K-Kov (11 October 1987), was born and raised in Bat Yam, Israel, to a family Bukharan Jews.

== Musical career ==
=== Career beginning ===
K-Kov began his career by making beats in his parents' attic.
In 2005, he participated in season three of the reality television show Kokhav Nolad.
In 2006, he joined the Israel Defense Forces and was assigned to its Education Corps as a singer and music producer in the corps's band. During his service, K-Kov got his first big break as a music producer and songwriter for the 2008 annual Hanukkah show "Festigal," which featured well-known Israeli entertainers like Gal Gadot, Shiri Maimon, Shlomi Shabat, Oz Zehavi, and many more.

=== 2009–2014 ===
In 2009, K-Kov developed, produced, and co-wrote Avihu Shabat's debut album "Avihu." The album was a major success and achieved many awards such as the Platinum album for cellular downloads, "Best new artist of the year," and "Most played song of the year." In 2010, K-Kov developed, produced, and co-wrote Chen Aharoni's debut album. One of the singles, "Breath," became the most played song on Israeli radio stations during 2010 and that year's fourth most-viewed Israeli music video on YouTube. In 2011, he produced Avihu's second album. In 2012, Nitzan produced the theme song for the hit TV series "Galis" for HOT. In March 2012, K-Kov co-wrote and produced the winning song "Tzoeket Lecha" (Calling You) for The Voice Israel's Season 1 winner, Kathleen Reiter. In 2013, K-Kov produced the official remix "Infinite Love," performed by two-time Academy Awards winning A.R. Rahman.

=== 2015–present ===
In 2015, K-Kov co-wrote and produced the theme song along with six other songs for seasons one and two of the Nickelodeon music series Make It Pop. That year, K-Kov started working with Keith Urban on the album Ripcord, which was nominated for "Country album of the year" in the Country Music Association Awards. The album was also nominated for "Best country album of the year" in the 2017 Grammy Awards and won the American Music Award for Favorite Country Album.

In 2016, K-Kov started working with The Shadowboxers as a co-writer. In June 2017, the band started to record its album with K-Kov and Justin Timberlake as co-producers. The band released its debut single on 22 September 2017, "Hot Damn!" co-written by K-Kov and The Shadowboxers and co-produced by Justin Timberlake and K-Kov.

Most recently, K-Kov co-wrote and produced the 2019 single "You Don't Even Know Me," co-written and performed by Faouzia.

== Discography ==
- Catch The festigl (2008)
- Avihu by Avihu Shabat (2009)
- Chen Aharoni (2010)
- Feels Good by Avihu Shabat (2011)
- Haamtzan (Oxygen) by Itzik Shamly (2011)
- Yom Ehad Tevakshy by Shir Levy (2011)
- Ken L'ahava by Idan Yaniv (2011)
- Nosea Rachok by Chen Aharoni (2012)
- Snow in the heat wave by Shiri Maimon (2012)
- Spy Festigal (2013)
- Derech by Avihu Shabat (2013)
- Kol hamilim Ha'smechot by Moshe Peretz (2014)
- HaLev by Shlomi Shabat (2015)
- Besof kol yom by Eyal Golan (2015)
- Make It Pop, Vol. 1 by the Make It Pop cast (2015)
- Make It Pop, Vol. 2 by the Make It Pop cast (2016)
- Simaney Hazman by Moshe Peretz (2016)
- Ripcord by Keith Urban (2016)
- Nisim Shkufim by Rita (Israeli singer) (2017)
- Apollo EP by The Shadowboxers (2018)

== Singles ==
- "Bishvileh" by Avihu Shabat
- "Adain Sheleh" by Avihu Shabat
- "Holek Leibud" by Avihu Shabat
- "Rak Itah" by Avihu Shabat
- "Lihiyot" by Avihu Shabat
- "At Kol Kah Yafa" by Avihu Shabat
- "Faith" by Avihu Shabat and Shlomi Shabat
- "Tishahari" by Avihu Shabat
- "At Nogaat" by Avihu Shabat
- "Hee Efshar Itah" by Avihu Shabat
- "Alone" by Avihu Shabat
- "Ose Lah Tov" by Avihu Shabat
- "Barehov" by Chen Aharoni
- "All I Want" by Chen Aharoni
- "Boi Boi" by Chen Aharoni
- "If You Doesn't Love" by Chen Aharoni
- "Lahavor Et Hapahad" by Chen Aharoni
- "Grow Up" by Chen Aharoni
- "Breath" by Chen Aharoni and Esti Ginzburg
- "Shakuf" by Chen Aharoni
- "Tafur Aliha" by Chen Aharoni
- "Forget All" by Chen Aharoni
- "Diving" by Sahar Hagai
- "Matzil Otah" by Sahar Hagai
- "Hahora Mikan" by Sahar Hagai
- "Hahavat Hayai" by Idan Yaniv
- "Lo Mevater" by Idan Yaniv
- "Omed Bamakom" by Idan Yaniv and Lee Biran
- "Konfeti" by Lihi Attar
- "Ito Lanetzah" by Lihi Attar
- "Tirkod" by Lihi Attar
- "Dereh Hadasha" by Niv Kaikov
- "Pesek Zman" by Niv Kaikov
- "Orot Shel Hanuyot" by Sharon Haziz
- "Dakot Shel Orot" by Esti Ginzburg
- "Holek Lesham" by Chen Aharoni
- "Mami" by Chen Aharoni
- "Or" by Chen Aharoni
- "Anor Anor" by Shir Levi
- "Lo Tihi Yoter Levad" by Itzik Shamli
- "Hamtzan" by Itzik Shamli
- "Kedat Moshe Ve Israel" by Itzik Shamli
- "Besheket" by Shirly Nov
- "Qesem" by Shirly Nov
- "Oser Gadol" by Avi Ben Abu
- "Ma Osim" by Avi Ben Abu
- "Leitkarev" by Harel Skaat
- "Noise" by Chen Aharoni
- "Something New" by Amit Farkash
- "Shaharit" by Shahar Shai
- "Ashir Lah" by Shiri Maimon
- "Bli Taharut" by Dana Frieder
- "Electric Girl" by Dana Frieder
- "Catch the Festigal" by Festigal (2008)
- "Rosh Be Rosh" by Don Leni Gabay and Tal Museri
- "Biglal Gaaguhay" by Dana Lapidot
- "Derech" by Avihu Shabat
- "Tzoeket Lecha" (Calling You) by Katleen Reiter and TheVoice Israel
- "Infinite Love" – Remix (original song by A.R. Rahman)
- "Achshav" by Harel Skaat
- "Dilema" by Shiri Maimon
- "Ulay ani becha" by Shiri Maimon
- "Lizrok zahav" by Shiri Maimon
- "Crazy" by Chen Aharoni
- "World War Three" – Orisha Sound Feat. Beenie Man
- "Shar Lach" by Moshe Peretz
- "comfortably dumb" by lisa d'amato
- "Break free" by Loren Smith
- Beautiful smile" by Loren Smith
- "Sheeriot meatzmi" by Shir Levy
- "Bamechonit Ha'ktana" by Shir Levy
- "Takshivi li" by Maya Buskila
- "Now I'm Here" by Make It Pop
- "Make It Pop by Make It Pop
- "My Girlz" by Make It Pop
- "Tomorrow Is Ours" by Make It Pop

" No Way" by Make It Pop

- "Hatzi Yareah" by the Ninth floor
- "Tluya Baavir" by The Ultras and the Ninth floor
- "Im ani Rotze" by Sahar Hagai
- "Drool" by Erin Bowman
- "Anna" by Josh Stevens
- "Habit of you" by Keith Urban
- "Chai" by Sahar Hagai
- "Leilot Arokim by Moshe Peretz
- "Mizman" by Rita (Israeli singer)
- "Hot Damn!" by The Shadowboxers
- "Ahava Balev" by Chen Aharoni
- "Zero" by Marina Maximilian
- "Boi Nirkod" by Chen Aharoni ft. The Ultras
- "You Don't Even Know Me" by Faouzia (2019)
- "Bling Bling" by Noa Kirel
- "Trilili Tralala" by Noa Kirel and Ilan Peled
- "Feel The Buzz" by Ninet Tayeb
- "Reflexions" by Amir Haddad
- "Thought About That" Noa Kirel
