= The World (Angel song) =

Single by Angel

from the album About Time
- Released: 5 April 2013
- Recorded: 2012
- Genre: R&B
- Length: 3:44
- Label: Universal Island Records
- Songwriters: Sirach Charles, Kassa Alexander, Parker Ighile, Dion Wardle, Michael Riley

Angel singles chronology
"Time After Time" (2012)	"The World" (2013)	"Lights On" (2013)

"The World" is a song by British musician Angel. It was first released in the United Kingdom on 5 April 2013 as the fourth single from his debut studio album About Time (2013). The song peaked at number 73 on the UK Singles Chart.

== Music video ==
A music video to accompany the release of "The World" was first released onto YouTube on 7 February 2013 at a total length of three minutes and fifty-four seconds.

The music video starts off in the future (25 March 2063), a grandma is dying, her family surrounding her. She looks up and sees someone in the room, no one else can see this person. He puts out his hand and she takes it which takes her into a travel through her life and becomes young again. Then we find out that she and Angel once were lovers and we go through all these moments of her life until Angel died. After Angel's death, we can see that the young woman is devastated while Angel (as an angel) watches over her.

== Track listing ==
Digital Download – Single
No.	Title	Length
1.	"The World"	3:44

Digital Download – The Remix's
No.	Title	Length
1.	"The World" (Shift K3Y Remix)	3:17
2.	"The World" (DJ Pioneer & TJ Deep House Remix)	6:17
3.	"The World" (SG Lewis Remix)	4:43
4.	"The World" (Erol Sabadosh Remix)	4:39

== Chart performance ==
=== Weekly charts ===
Chart (2012)	Peak position
UK Dance (OCC)	12
UK Singles (Official Charts Company)	73

== Release history ==
Country	Release date	Format	Label
United Kingdom	5 April 2013	Digital download	Universal Island Records
