= Ripcord (album) =

Studio album by Keith Urban
- Released: 6 May 2016
- Recorded: 2015–16
- Studio: Hollywood
- Genre: Country pop
- Length: 45:42
- Labels: Hit Red; Capitol Nashville
- Producers: Jeff Bhasker; busbee; Nathan Chapman; Nitzan Kaikov; Dann Huff; Tyler Johnson; Johnny Price; Nile Rodgers; Keith Urban; Greg Wells

Keith Urban chronology
Fuse (2013)	Ripcord (2016)	Graffiti U (2018)

Singles from Ripcord
- 1. "John Cougar, John Deere, John 3:16" Released: 9 June 2015; 2. "Break on Me" Released: 23 October 2015; 3. "Wasted Time" Released: 4 April 2016; 4. "Blue Ain't Your Color" Released: 8 August 2016; 5. "The Fighter" Released: 6 February 2017

Ripcord is the ninth studio album by Australian country music singer Keith Urban. It was released on 6 May 2016 via Hit Red and Capitol Records Nashville. The album produced the singles "John Cougar, John Deere, John 3:16"; "Break on Me", "Wasted Time", "Blue Ain't Your Color", and "The Fighter". It also features musical artists Nile Rodgers, Pitbull, and Carrie Underwood. Just like his previous album Fuse (2013), Urban co-worked with multiple producers on this one.

The album was nominated for Best Country Album at the 59th Annual Grammy Awards. On 7 April 2017, the album was certified Platinum by the RIAA.

== Background ==
This album has been called Urban's most experimental album to date. Urban told Rolling Stone, "It was a lot of searching, a lot of experimenting, and when you get to work with as many people as I did, you end up with a lot of stuff."

One of the tracks, "Sun Don't Let Me Down" features Pitbull, and Nile Rodgers on guitar.

== Promotion ==
Urban promoted the album by performing "Wasted Time" on The Tonight Show Starring Jimmy Fallon on 6 May and on The Ellen DeGeneres Show on 12 May 2016. Three days after the album was released Urban played a free lunchtime concert in front of the Bridgestone Arena in Nashville on 9 May 2016. He performed tracks from Ripcord such as "Gone Tomorrow (Here Today)" and "Blue Ain't Your Color". Urban embarked on a world tour in support of the album on the RipCORD World Tour, beginning on 2 June 2016.

== Singles ==
The album's lead single "John Cougar, John Deere, John 3:16" was released on June 9, 2015. It reached number forty on the US Hot 100 and number two on both the Hot Country Songs and Country Airplay charts. The song was nominated for Best Country Solo Performance at the 58th Annual Grammy Awards but lost to Chris Stapleton's "Traveler".

The second single "Break on Me" was released on October 23, 2015. It reached number one on the Country Airplay chart and peaked at number six on Hot Country Songs, as well as number 54 on the Hot 100.

"Wasted Time" was released as the third single on April 4, 2016. Like its predecessor, it also reached number one on Country Airplay chart. In addition, it peaked at number four on Hot Country Songs and at number 51 on the Hot 100.

"Blue Ain't Your Color" was released on July 30, 2016 as the album's fourth single by Urban via Snapchat. The song reached number one on both the Hot Country Songs and Country Airplay charts. Also, it reached number 24 on Hot 100.

"The Fighter", a duet with fellow country musician Carrie Underwood, was released as the album's fifth single on February 6, 2017. Urban wrote the song with his producer busbee while the two were in London.It peaked at number two on both the Hot Country Songs and Country Airplay chart. It also reached number 38 on the Hot 100 chart.

== Critical reception ==
Professional ratings
Aggregate scores
Source	Rating
Metacritic	72/100
Review scores
Source	Rating
ABC News	3/5 stars
AllMusic	3.5/5 stars
Entertainment Weekly	B−
The Sydney Morning Herald	3/5 stars

Ripcord has received generally positive reviews from music critics. On Metacritic — which assigns a normalized rating out of 100 to reviews from mainstream critics, the album received an average score of 72 based on 4 reviews, indicating "generally favorable reviews". ABC News' Allan Raible says that the album "is not really a country record" but rather "...more of an electric-pop influenced record," saying that it "[also] reeks of formula but at the same time, there's something enjoyably adventurous about this record." At The Sydney Morning Herald, the album received three stars and reports that "Urban threads a tight needle, updating the slick contemporary American country sound he, long ago, mastered with the warm washes and bright punctuation of pop music," adding that "[i]t is, at first suggestion, an almost ludicrous concept, but it's testament to Urban's craftsmanship that the record is dexterous and pleasing."

Sounds Like Nashville described the album as "a remarkably diverse album that pushes boundaries and furthers Urban’s evolution as an artist."

For the collaborations on the album, The News-Sentinel's Michael McCall describes "The Fighter", the duet with Carrie Underwood, as "a modern update of Marvin Gaye and Tammi Terrell", and views the collaboration with Pitbull and Nile Rodgers ("Sun Don't Let Me Down") as something "more like an exercise [rather] than a celebration".

=== Accolades ===
The album received a nomination for Album of the Year both at the 50th Annual Country Music Association Awards and 52nd Academy of Country Music Awards. It was also nominated for Best Country Album at the 59th Grammy Awards.

Year	Association	Category	Result
2016	CMA Awards	Album of the Year	Nominated
2017	59th Annual Grammy Awards	Best Country Album	Nominated
2017	ACM Awards	Album of the Year	Nominated
2017	Billboard Music Awards	Top Country Album	Nominated

== Commercial performance ==
Ripcord debuted at number one in Urban's home country of Australia, and at number 21 in New Zealand. It stayed at number one on the Australian albums chart for a second week, becoming his first album to spend more than one week at the top of that chart. The album was certified Platinum in Australia for shipments of over 70,000 units.

The album debuted at number 3 on the Canadian Albums chart and was certified Gold for shipments of over 40,000 units.

In the US, it debuted at number one on the Billboard's Top Country Albums chart, becoming Urban's fifth number one album on that chart. The disc also debuted at number 4 on Billboard 200, earning over 106,000 album-equivalent units (93,000 pure sales) during its first week. The album remained at number one on the Top Country Albums chart for a second week. On April 7, 2017, the album was certified Platinum by the RIAA. As of June 2018, it has sold over 740,700 copies in the United States.

== Track listing ==
No.	Title	Writer(s)	Producer(s)	Length
1.	"Gone Tomorrow (Here Today)"	Keith Urban; Jeff Bhasker; Tyler Johnson	Urban; Bhasker; Tyler Johnson	2:48
2.	"John Cougar, John Deere, John 3:16"	Shane McAnally; Ross Copperman; Josh Osborne	Urban; Dann Huff	3:42
3.	"Wasted Time"	Urban; Greg Wells; James Abrahart	Urban; Wells	3:53
4.	"Habit of You"	Nitzan Kaikov; Jackson Morgan	Urban; K-Kov	3:44
5.	"Sun Don't Let Me Down" (featuring Nile Rodgers and Pitbull)	Urban; busbee; Nile Rodgers; Armando Christian Perez	Urban; busbee; Rodgers	3:23
6.	"Gettin' in the Way"	Emily Weisband; Jordan Reynolds; David Hodges	Urban; Huff	3:48
7.	"Blue Ain't Your Color"	Steven Lee Olsen; Hillary Lindsey; Clint Lagerberg	Urban; Huff	3:50
8.	"The Fighter" (featuring Carrie Underwood)	Urban; busbee	Urban; busbee	3:04
9.	"Break on Me"	Copperman; Jon Nite	Urban; Nathan Chapman	3:29
10.	"Boy Gets a Truck"	Ash Bowers; Aaron Scherz	Urban; Huff	3:29
11.	"Your Body"	Urban; busbee	Urban; busbee	2:45
12.	"That Could Still Be Us"	Jason Duke; Jesse Lee; Jonny Price	Urban; Price	3:57
13.	"Worry 'Bout Nothin'"	Chris Tompkins; Rodney Clawson; Josh Kear	Urban; Huff	3:50
Total length:				45:42

== Personnel ==
Adapted from AllMusic and Ripcord liner notes.

"Gone Tomorrow (Here Today)"

- Jeff Bhasker – piano, keyboards, programming, background vocals
- James Gadson – drums
- Tyler Johnson – programming, keyboards, background vocals
- Keith Urban – vocals, electric guitar, ganjo, EBow

"John Cougar, John Deere, John 3:16"

- Matt Chamberlain – drums, programming
- Ross Copperman – gang vocals
- Jerry Flowers – background vocals
- Dann Huff – acoustic guitar, gang vocals
- Charlie Judge – keyboards
- Andy Snyder – gang vocals
- Russell Terrell – background vocals
- Keith Urban – bass guitar, acoustic guitar, electric guitar, vocals
- Jonathan Yudkin – violin

"Wasted Time"

- James Abrahart – background vocals
- Greg Wells – piano, keyboards, programming
- Keith Urban – acoustic guitar, electric guitar, ganjo

"Habit of You"

- Matt Chamberlain – drums
- Charlie Judge – keyboards
- K-KOV – programming, background vocals
- Pino Palladino – bass guitar
- Keith Urban – electric guitar, ganjo, Ebow

"Sun Don't Let Me Down"

- Shanika Bereal – background vocals
- busbee – bass guitar, programming, keyboards, background vocals
- Eric Darken – percussion
- Russell Graham – programming, keyboards
- Samantha Nelson – background vocals
- Pino Palladino – bass guitar
- Tiffany Palmer – background vocals
- Pitbull – rapping
- Nile Rodgers – electric guitar, whistling
- Aaron Sterling – drums
- Keith Urban – electric guitar, ganjo, vocals

"Gettin' in the Way"

- Nathan Barlowe – programming
- Matt Chamberlain – programming
- Dann Huff – electric guitar, keyboards
- Charlie Judge – synthesizer
- Pino Palladino – bass guitar
- Russell Terrell – background vocals
- Keith Urban – electric guitar, acoustic guitar, mandolin, vocals

"Blue Ain't Your Color"

- Matt Chamberlain – drums, programming
- Dann Huff – acoustic guitar
- Charlie Judge – keyboards, synthesizer
- Pino Palladino – bass guitar
- Russell Terrell – background vocals
- Keith Urban – acoustic guitar, electric guitar, nylon-string guitar, vocals

"The Fighter"

- busbee – bass guitar, keyboards, electric guitar, programming
- Carrie Underwood – vocals
- Keith Urban – acoustic guitar, electric guitar, mandolin, ganjo, vocals

"Break on Me"

- Matt Chamberlain – programming
- Nathan Chapman – programming, keyboards, background vocals
- Charlie Judge – keyboards
- Russell Terrell – background vocals
- Keith Urban – acoustic guitar, electric guitar, vocals
- Tal Wilkenfeld – bass guitar

"Boy Gets a Truck"

- Matt Chamberlain – drums, programming
- Dann Huff – electric guitar, synthesizer
- Charlie Judge – keyboards, synthesizer
- Pino Palladino – bass guitar
- Russell Terrell – background vocals
- Keith Urban – electric guitar, vocals

"Your Body"

- busbee – keyboards, bass guitar, programming, electric guitar, background vocals
- Russell Terrell – background vocals
- Keith Urban – ganjo, mandolin, acoustic guitar, electric guitar, vocals

"That Could Still Be Us"

- Jonny Price – programming, synthesizers, keyboards

"Worry 'Bout Nothin'"

- Nathan Barlowe – programming, synthesizer
- Matt Chamberlain – drums, programming
- Dann Huff – electric guitar
- Charlie Judge – keyboards, synthesizer
- Pino Palladino – bass guitar
- Russell Terrell – background vocals
- Keith Urban – electric guitar, acoustic guitar, ganjo, Ebow

Production

- Assistants – Josh Ditty, John Edwards, Justin Fisher, Chris Galland, Nik Karpen, Seth Morton, Mike Stankiewicz
- Editing – Dave Clauss, Sean Neff
- Engineer – Joe Baldridge, Jeff Bhasker, Dave Clauss, Dann Huff, Tyler Johnson, Ryan Nashi, Dave O'Donnell, Jonny Price, Brandon Schexnayder, Greg Wells
  - Assistant engineers – Tyler Sheilds
- Mixer – Serban Ghenea, Chris Lord-Alge, Manny Marroquin, Tony Maserati, Justin Niebank
  - Mixing engineer – John Hanes, Nik Karpen
- Producers – Jeff Bhasker, busbee, Nathan Chapman, Dann Huff, Nitzan Kaikov, Tyler Johnson, Jonny Price, Nile Rodgers, Keith Urban, Greg Wells
- Mastering – Tom Coyne at Sterling Sound

== Charts ==
=== Weekly charts ===
Chart (2016)	Peak position
Australian Albums (ARIA)	1
Belgian Albums (Ultratop Flanders)	183
Canadian Albums (Billboard)	3
New Zealand Albums (RMNZ)	15
UK Album Downloads (Official Charts)	50
UK Country Albums (Official Charts)	2
UK Independent Albums (Official Charts)	29
US Billboard 200	4
US Top Country Albums (Billboard)	1

=== Year-end charts ===
Chart (2016)	Position
Australian Albums (ARIA)	2
Canadian Albums (Billboard)	26
US Billboard 200	51
US Top Country Albums (Billboard)	9

Chart (2017)	Position
Australian Albums (ARIA)	25
Canadian Albums (Billboard)	45
US Billboard 200	27
US Top Country Albums (Billboard)	3

Chart (2018)	Position
US Billboard 200	183
US Top Country Albums (Billboard)	21

=== Decade-end charts ===
Chart (2010–2019)	Position
Australian Albums (ARIA)	85
Australian Artist Albums (ARIA)	17

== Certifications and sales ==
Region	Certification	Certified units/sales
Australia (ARIA)	2× Platinum	140,000^{^}
Canada (Music Canada)	Platinum	80,000^{‡}
New Zealand (RMNZ)	Gold	7,500^{‡}
United States (RIAA)	2× Platinum	2,000,000^{‡} / 740,700
^{^} Shipments figures based on certification alone.^{‡} Sales+streaming figures based on certification alone.

== Release history ==
List of release dates, showing region, formats, label, editions and references
Region	Date	Format(s)	Label	Edition(s)	Ref
Australia	6 May 2016	CD; digital download; vinyl	Universal	Standard	
Canada	6 May 2016	CD; digital download; vinyl	Universal	Standard	
Japan	6 May 2016	CD; digital download; vinyl	Universal	Standard	
New Zealand	6 May 2016	CD; digital download; vinyl	Universal	Standard	
United Kingdom	6 May 2016	CD; digital download; vinyl	Capitol Nashville	Standard	
United States	6 May 2016	CD; digital download; vinyl	Hit Red; Capitol Nashville	Standard	

== See also ==
- List of number-one albums of 2016 (Australia)
- List of number-one country albums of 2016 (Australia)
