= Angel (British musician) =

English singer, songwriter, rapper, and record producer (born 1987)

- Born: Sirach Charles; 31 October 1987 (age 39)
- Origin: Shepherd's Bush, London, England
- Genres: R&B, hip hop
- Occupations: Singer, songwriter, rapper, record producer
- Years active: 2009–present
- Labels: Island, Motown Records (US)
- Website: thisisangel.com

Sirach Charles (born 31 October 1987), better known by his stage name Angel, is an English singer, songwriter, rapper, and record producer. His single "Go In, Go Hard", featuring vocals from English rapper Wretch 32, was released on 18 March 2012. The song reached number 41 on the UK Singles Chart. The following single, "Wonderful", performed better commercially, peaking at number nine on the UK Singles Chart and topping the UK R&B Chart.

== Early life ==
Angel grew up in Shepherd's Bush in West London, with his two brothers and two sisters. His father is Grenadian. Angel drew his main influence from his father, former manager and talented musician Tendai Charles, a professional keyboardist who accompanied an array of Reggae music talents including Kaya, Bob Marley and Dennis Brown.

His brother, Akelle Charles, found fame in summer 2015 with his track "In2" (featuring Haile and Louis Rei). The song racked up thousands of views and was signed to Atlantic Records, and the three artists released the song under the new stage name WSTRN.

== Music career ==
=== 2010–11: Early career ===
Angel started off in a band with his brothers and sisters called the Charles Family. After playing at over 300 schools, the band of siblings decided to disband. Angel (formerly known as Bud or Ching) released his first mixtape Patience Is a Virtue in 2010. The mixtape included the songs "Julie" and "Run This Redeye".

Angel co-wrote the UK number-one single "Green Light" by Roll Deep with his writing team Parallel, which sold 400,000 copies in the UK. He co-wrote and featured on Wretch 32's album Black and White, singing on "Never Be Me" and "I'm Not the Man" (also featuring Chipmunk). The album sold over 150,000 copies in the UK. He wrote and produced "Coming Home" for Pixie Lott and Jason Derulo.

During 2011 Angel released his mixtape 7 Minutes Before Time featuring the likes of Wiley, Maxsta, Giggs, Cleo Sol, Wretch 32, G Frsh, Scorcher, Sneakbo and Mark Asari. Videos were shot for the songs "Gleamin" featuring Wiley and Maxsta, "Popstar" featuring Giggs, "Ride Out" featuring Sneakbo, "Bottles" featuring G Frsh and Scorcher and lastly "Go in Go Hard" featuring Wretch 32, which was shot in early 2012.

=== 2012–2014: Mainstream success ===
Angel released another mixtape, Any Minute Now, in 2012, which unlike 7 Minutes Before Time included one feature, "Are You Good" featuring Mark Asari of Encore. Angel covered several songs on the mixtape, including Rihanna's "Man Down" and Prince's "The Most Beautiful Girl in the World". "Fire" was mixed from Lauryn Hill's "To Zion", while "Tokin Grade" was Angel's interpretation of Frank Ocean's "Novacane".

On 18 March 2012 Angel released the single "Go In, Go Hard", which features vocals from Wretch 32. On 25 March 2012 the song entered the UK Singles Chart at number 41 and at number 14 on the UK R&B Chart.

On 15 July 2012 Angel released his second single "Wonderful". It first charted on the UK Singles Chart at number twenty on the chart week ending 22 July. On its sixth charting week dated 26 August "Wonderful" entered the top 10 at number nine, becoming Angel's first top-10 hit and his first R&B number one. On 12 November 2012, Angel performed at the 02 Academy in Brixton for the BBC Radio 1Xtra concert, along with acts such as Tulisa and Trey Songz.

Angel also featured on the official Children in Need single, "Wish I Belonged", alongside Fazer, Tyler James and Stooshe.

Angel released "Time After Time" on 2 December, which he composed with Theron Thomas, Timothy Thomas, Kassa Alexander, James Abrahart, and Tommy Hittz. The song was listed on the BBC 1xtra A playlist on 6 December 2012. Meanwhile, an acoustic preview of "Ride or Die", a duet by Angel and Misha B, was published on 21 November 2012 by SoulCultureMedia, and filmed by Darryl Daniel, Fabian Thomas and Versetti at the Artspace Studios in Brixton, South London. The duo performed a medley of their singles, with Angel giving us a rendition of Misha's "Do You Think of Me" and Misha taking on Angel's "Time After Time", before the pair sung "Ride or Die". "Ride or Die" was officially released as the B-side to Angel's "Time After Time" on 6 December 2012. The track was composed by Angel, Kassa Alexander and Misha Amber Bryan. The official music video was directed by Paul Akinrinlola and Adam Deacon (who also stars), and produced by Parallel Pictures for Universal Music.

As a songwriter, Angel has written songs used by UK urban acts such as Roll Deep and Devlin, as well as composing pop pieces for the likes of JLS and Cheryl Cole.

=== 2015–2017: Her EP ===
In 2015, Angel again sang on his single "Leyla" (featuring Fuse ODG). His following single "Rude Boy" (featuring Haile from group Wstrn) was released on 4 March 2016. "Rude Boy" was later included on Angel's EP Her, released on 18 November 2016. The EP features collaborations with R&B and hip-hop artists on "Fvxk with You" (Rich Homie Quan) and "Hop On" (Stefflon Don).

In 2017, Angel released the singles "Crud", "Road Closed", "Hi-Grade" (featuring reggae singer Protoje), as well as the acoustic version of "Hi-Grade". The end of 2017 saw Angel release a take on Eugene Wilde's R&B track "Gotta Get You Home Tonight" called "Take You Home". The song includes samples of Foxxy Brown & Black Street's revisions of the old school jam and a bridge similar to that of SWV's "I'm So into You".

=== 2018: Woman ===
Angel released the album Woman on 8 June 2018. The project incorporates elements of R&B, trap, and hip-hop. The opening track, "No Flutes", features a second collaboration with Eric Bellinger. Another track, "Fly", includes appearances by Haile (of Wstrn) and Giggs, utilising a trap-R&B style.

The song "Thug Juice" contains melodic references to 2Pac's song "Thug Passion". The album was initially released in two parts, but was followed by the entire release featuring 14 tracks and later, acoustic versions of tracks "Nothing Wrong", "Risk It All" and "Thug Juice". The music video for "Nothing Wrong" includes visual references to R. Kelly's "Honey Love" (1991) and "Bump n' Grind" (1993).

== Discography ==
=== Studio albums ===
Title	Album details	Peak chart positions
Title	Album details	UK
About Time	Released: 15 April 2013; Label: Island; Formats: CD, digital download	33
Woman	Released: 8 June 2018; Label: Island, Motown; Formats: CD, digital download	—

=== Extended plays ===
Title	EP details
iTunes Festival: London 2012	Released: 1 January 2012; Label: Island Records; Formats: Digital download
7 Minutes Before Time	Released: 30 March 2012; Label: Island Records; Formats: CD, Digital download
Possession With Intent	Released: 2 November 2014; Label: Island Records; Formats: Digital download
Her	Released: 18 November 2016; Label: Island Records; Formats: Digital download

=== Mixtapes ===
Title	Details
Patience Is a Virtue	Released: 3 May 2010; Label: Parallel Music Group; Formats: Digital download
Any Minute Now	Released: 17 August 2012; Label: Island Records; Formats: Digital download
In Between Time	Released: 24 December 2012; Label: Parallel Music Group; Formats: Digital download

=== Singles ===
==== As lead artist ====
Title	Year	Peak chart positions				Album
Title	Year	UK	UK Dance	UK R&B	SCO	Album
"Julie"	2010	—	—	—	—	Patience Is a Virtue / About Time
"Go In, Go Hard" (featuring Wretch 32)	2012	41	—	14	—	About Time
"Wonderful"	2012	9	—	1	15	About Time
"Time After Time"	2012	41	—	4	—	About Time
"The World"	2013	73	12	—	—	About Time
"Rocket Love"	2013	—	—	—	—	About Time
"Leyla"	2015	—	—	—	—	Non-album single
"Rude Boy" (featuring Haile)	2016	—	—	—	—	Her
"Hop On" (featuring Stefflon Don)	2016	—	—	—	—	Her
"Hi Grade"	2017	—	—	—	—	Non-album singles
"Road Closed"	2017	—	—	—	—	Non-album singles
"Crud"	2017	—	—	—	—	Non-album singles
"No Days Off"	2017	—	—	—	—	Non-album singles
"Hi Grade (Acoustic)" (featuring Protoje)	2017	—	—	—	—	Non-album singles
"Take You Home"	2017	—	—	—	—	Non-album singles
"Fly" (featuring Giggs and Haile)	2018	—	—	—	—	Woman
"Blessings" (solo or remix featuring French Montana and Davido)	2019	—	—	—	—	Non-album singles
"Bad" (featuring Wretch 32)	2022	—	—	—	—	Non-album singles
"No Games" (featuring Haile & IQ)	2023	—	—	—	—	Non-album singles
"—" denotes single that did not chart or was not released.

==== As featured artist ====
Title	Year	Peak chart positions			Album
Title	Year	UK	UK Dance	SCO	Album
"Lights On" (Wiley featuring Angel & Tinchy Stryder)	2013	9	3	8	The Ascent
"T.I.N.A." (Fuse ODG featuring Angel)	2014	9	—	8	TINA
"Himmat" (Makhan Dhillon featuring The Dark MC & Angel)	2015	—	—	—	Non-album singles
"Take My Number" (Yungen featuring Angel)	2016	—	—	—	Non-album singles
"Bridge over Troubled Water" (as part of Artists for Grenfell)	2017	1	—	1	Non-album singles
"—" denotes single that did not chart or was not released.
