= SBS Gayo Daejeon =

South Korea annual televised music festival

- 2023 Gayo Daejeon poster
- Also known as: SBS Gayo Daejun
- Hangul: SBS 가요대전
- Hanja: SBS 歌謠大戰
- RR: SBS Gayodaejeon
- MR: SBS Kayodaejŏn
- Genre: Music
- Country of origin: South Korea
- Original language: Korean
- No. of episodes: 27

Original release
- Network: Seoul Broadcasting System
- Release: 1997 – present

SBS Gayo Daejeon (Korean: SBS 가요대전, broadly SBS Battle of the Bands) is an annual televised music festival that is broadcast by the Seoul Broadcasting System at the end of each year. The program first aired in 1997, and awards were given to musical artists from 1997 to 2006. The awards ceremony portion of the festival was revived in 2014 and discontinued the following year.

== Hosts ==
Year	Hosts	Ref.
1997		
1998		
1999		
2000	Seo Se-won and Chae Rim	
2001		
2002	Lee Moon-sae and Jeong Ji-yeong	
2003	Lee Moon-sae and Kim Jung-eun	
2004	Lee Moon-sae and Sung Yu-ri	
2005	Lee Moon-sae and Lee Bo-young	
2006	Lee Moon-sae and Park Jin-hee	
2007	Lee Hwi-jae and Lee Hyori	
2008	Lee Chun-hee, Park Ye-jin, and Daesung	
2009	Heechul, Jung Yong-hwa, and Park Shin-hye	
2010	Heechul, Jung Yong-hwa, Jo Kwon, and Hwang Jung-eum	
2011	Lee Seung-gi, Song Ji-hyo, and Im Yoon-ah	
2012	Suzy, IU, and Jung Gyu-woon	
2013	Heechul, Sandara Park, and Sung Si-kyung	
2014	Jung Yong-hwa, Nichkhun, Mino, Baro, L, and Song Ji-hyo	
2015	IU and Shin Dong-yup	
2016	You Hee-yeol, Yuri, and Baekhyun	
2017	You Hee-yeol and IU	
2018	Jun Hyun-moo and Jo Bo-ah	
2019	Jun Hyun-moo and Seolhyun	
2020	Boom, Heechul and Na Eun	
2021	Boom, Key and Yuna	
2022	Key, Cha Eun-woo and An Yu-jin	
2023	Key, An Yu-jin and Yeonjun	
2024	Doyoung, An Yu-jin, and Yeonjun	
2025	Summer: Doyoung, An Yu-jin, and Yeonjun	
2025	Winter: Jaemin, An Yu-jin, and Young K	
2026	Summer: Sungchan, Sion and Ian	
2026	Winter: An Yu-jin, Yeonjun and Sungchan (Day 1); Jisoo, Woonhak and Shinyu (Day 2)	

== Grand prize winners (1997–2006) ==
Year	Artist	Song title
1997	H.O.T.	"Full of Happiness"
1998	H.O.T.	"Hope"
1999	Fin.K.L	"Forever Love"
2000	Jo Sung-mo	"Do You Know?"
2001	g.o.d	"Road"
2002	BoA	"No. 1"
2003	Lee Hyori	"10 Minutes"
2004	Shinhwa	"Brand New"
2005	Kim Jong-kook	"Loveable"
2006	TVXQ	"'O'-Jung.Ban.Hap."

== Music festival (2007–2013) ==
=== 2007 ===
Performers at the 2007 festival included Big Bang, CL, F.T. Island, G.Soul, Girls' Generation, Jinusean, Lim Jeong-hee, SeeYa, Se7en, SG Wannabe, Super Junior, The Grace, Wonder Girls, Younha, and 1TYM. The festival ended with a performance by boy band Shinhwa in celebration of their tenth anniversary.

=== 2008: Festival S ===
The 2008 festival was divided into segments based on themes starting with the letter "S," including "Super Rookie," "Sexy," "Star Wars," and "Stand up." Performers included Big Bang, BoA, Brown Eyed Girls, Davichi, Epik High, Eun Ji-won, Jang Yun-jeong, Jewelry, Kara, Kim Jong-kook, Park Hyun-bin, Rain, Seo Taiji, SG Wannabe, Shinee, Son Dam-bi, Song Dae-kwan, Super Junior-H, Tae Jin-ah, Taeyeon, TVXQ, Wonder Girls, 2AM, and 2PM.

=== 2009: Wonder World ===
The theme of the 2009 festival was "Wonder World." Performers included After School, Beast, Brown Eyed Girls, Davichi, F(x), G-Dragon, Girls' Generation, J. Y. Park, Kara, Kim Tae-woo, K.Will, Lee Seung-gi, MBLAQ, Shinee, Son Dam-bi, Super Junior, Taeyang, T-ara, 2AM, 2PM, 2NE1, and 4Minute.

=== 2010: Welcome to Music Factory ===
The 2010 festival, entitled, "Welcome to Music Factory," included a collaborative performance of Britney Spears' song "Circus," featuring Taemin (Shinee), Seohyun (Girls' Generation), Jiyeon (T-ara), Chansung (2PM), Mir (MBLAQ), Sulli (F(x)), and Lizzy (After School), all of whom were the youngest members in their respective music groups.

Other performers included CNBLUE, GD & TOP, Hong Jin-young, Jang Yun-jeong, Kim Gun-mo, Kim Jong-seo, Miss A, Narsha, Park Hyun-bin, Sistar, Son Dam-bi, Super Junior, Tae Jin-ah, ZE:A, and 2NE1.

=== 2011: Korean Wave ===
The 2011 edition of the festival was held at the Korea International Exhibition Center (KINTEX) on 29 December, under the theme of "K-pop Stars" and the Korean Wave. Performers included 2NE1, Girls' Generation, TVXQ, Super Junior, Wonder Girls, Kim Hyun-joong, Kara, Yoon Mi-rae, Leessang, Dynamic Duo, Brown Eyed Girls, CNBLUE, Miss A, 4Minute, f(x), IU, Shinee, After School, G.NA, Secret, Sistar, MBLAQ, T-ara, Davichi, The Grace, F.T. Island, K.Will, 2PM, U-Kiss, B1A4, Rainbow, Infinite, Apink, Boyfriend, Dal Shabet, and Beast.

The ceremony also featured a series of collaboration stages from artists including IU and Yoeob, K. Will and Tiffany, 2PM's Jun. K and Davichi. SMTown presented a special stage with TVXQ and Kai, Luhan, Tao, and Chen of the agency's new boy group Exo, who would eventually debut in April of the following year.

=== 2012: Color of K-Pop ===
The 2012 SBS Gayo Daejeon was aired live from Korea University on 29 December. Performers were TVXQ, Super Junior, Big Bang, Dynamic Duo, Epik High, f(x), Shinee, Ailee, B1A4, 2NE1, Secret, B.A.P, Sistar, T-ara, Glam, Teen Top, CN Blue, Exo, F.T. Island, Miss A, MBLAQ, Apink, Infinite, 4Minute, 2AM, After School, Beast, and Kara.

Under the theme "The Color of K-Pop", some of the biggest groups created four super idol groups, recorded a new single, and performed it together on stage. There were four teams consisting of members from different idols groups labeled under the names of Mystic White, Dramatic Blue, Dynamic Black, and Dazzling Red, who sang songs created by the hottest producers of 2012.

List of musical performances

Artist	Band	Song	Lyricist	Composer	Producer
Mystic WHITE
Jiyoung	Kara	Mermaid Princess (인어공주) (人魚公主)	Kim Do-hoon	Kim Do-hoon, Seo Yong-bae	Seo Yong-bae
Bora	Sistar	Mermaid Princess (인어공주) (人魚公主)	Kim Do-hoon	Kim Do-hoon, Seo Yong-bae	Seo Yong-bae
Sunhwa	Secret	Mermaid Princess (인어공주) (人魚公主)	Kim Do-hoon	Kim Do-hoon, Seo Yong-bae	Seo Yong-bae
Gayoon	4Minute	Mermaid Princess (인어공주) (人魚公主)	Kim Do-hoon	Kim Do-hoon, Seo Yong-bae	Seo Yong-bae
Lizzy	After School	Mermaid Princess (인어공주) (人魚公主)	Kim Do-hoon	Kim Do-hoon, Seo Yong-bae	Seo Yong-bae
Dramatic BLUE
Yoseob	Beast	Tearfully Beautiful (눈물나게 아름다운)	Song Su-yun	Kim Seung-soo, Han Jae-ho, Hong Seung-hyun	Kim Seung-soo, Han Jae-ho
Jo Kwon	2AM	Tearfully Beautiful (눈물나게 아름다운)	Song Su-yun	Kim Seung-soo, Han Jae-ho, Hong Seung-hyun	Kim Seung-soo, Han Jae-ho
Woohyun	Infinite	Tearfully Beautiful (눈물나게 아름다운)	Song Su-yun	Kim Seung-soo, Han Jae-ho, Hong Seung-hyun	Kim Seung-soo, Han Jae-ho
G.O.	MBLAQ	Tearfully Beautiful (눈물나게 아름다운)	Song Su-yun	Kim Seung-soo, Han Jae-ho, Hong Seung-hyun	Kim Seung-soo, Han Jae-ho
Niel	Teen Top	Tearfully Beautiful (눈물나게 아름다운)	Song Su-yun	Kim Seung-soo, Han Jae-ho, Hong Seung-hyun	Kim Seung-soo, Han Jae-ho
Dynamic BLACK
Gikwang	Beast	Yesterday	Shinsadong Tiger, LE	Shinsadong Tiger, LE	Shinsadong Tiger
Jinwoon	2AM	Yesterday	Shinsadong Tiger, LE	Shinsadong Tiger, LE	Shinsadong Tiger
Hoya	Infinite	Yesterday	Shinsadong Tiger, LE	Shinsadong Tiger, LE	Shinsadong Tiger
Lee Joon	MBLAQ	Yesterday	Shinsadong Tiger, LE	Shinsadong Tiger, LE	Shinsadong Tiger
L.Joe	Teen Top	Yesterday	Shinsadong Tiger, LE	Shinsadong Tiger, LE	Shinsadong Tiger
Dazzling RED
Nicole	Kara	This Person (이 사람)	Brave Brothers	Brave Brothers, Park Hyun Joong	Brave Brothers, Park Hyun Joong
Hyolyn	Sistar	This Person (이 사람)	Brave Brothers	Brave Brothers, Park Hyun Joong	Brave Brothers, Park Hyun Joong
Hyoseong	Secret	This Person (이 사람)	Brave Brothers	Brave Brothers, Park Hyun Joong	Brave Brothers, Park Hyun Joong
Hyuna	4Minute	This Person (이 사람)	Brave Brothers	Brave Brothers, Park Hyun Joong	Brave Brothers, Park Hyun Joong
Nana	After School	This Person (이 사람)	Brave Brothers	Brave Brothers, Park Hyun Joong	Brave Brothers, Park Hyun Joong

=== 2013: "You Are A Miracle" ===
PD Kim Yong Kwon stated, "Since the top singers are gathering together for the year-end ceremony, we wanted to do something meaningful. The singers will sing one song together and create a music video. All proceeds from the music and music videos will be donated through SBS's charity channel."

The collaboration song, "You Are A Miracle" has 125 participating singers, including Lee Seung Chul, Kim Jo Han, Park Jin Young, Tiger JK, Yoon Mirae, Lee Hyori, Sung Si Kyung, Kim Hee-chul, Brown Eyed Girls, T-ara, K.Will, Sunmi, Big Bang, Kara, Girls' Generation, Shinee, 2PM, IU, After School, 2NE1, 4minute, f(x), Beast, CNBLUE, ZE:A, Infinite, Miss A, Teen Top, Girl's Day, Apink, B1A4, Ailee, Exo, B.A.P, and more.

== Award show (2014) ==
=== 2014 ===
The 2014 SBS Gayo Daejeon took place on 21 December at the COEX Hall. It was hosted by Jung Yong-hwa, Nichkhun, Mino, Baro, L, and Song Ji-hyo. Awards were included in this year after being discontinued in 2007. Awards were removed again in 2015 not to be added again.

==== Award winners (2014) ====
- Album Grand Prize: Overdose by Exo-K and Exo-M
- Song Grand Prize: "Some" by Soyou and Junggigo
- Top Ten Artists: Exo, Girl's Day, Akdong Musician, Ailee, Sistar, 2NE1, Apink, Beast, Taeyang, Infinite
- Best Male Group: Exo
- Best Female Group: 2NE1
- Best Rookie Award: Winner
- Best Male Singer: Taeyang
- Best Female Singer: Ailee
- Global Star Award: 2PM
- Best Band Award: CNBLUE

== Music festival (2015–present) ==
=== 2015 ===
2015's Gayo Daejeon took place on 27 December at COEX Hall. It was hosted by IU and Shin Dong-yup.

Performers:

- 2PM
- 4Minute
- Apink
- Ailee
- AOA
- B1A4
- B.A.P
- BtoB
- CNBLUE
- EXID
- Exo
- GFriend
- Got7
- Hyukoh
- iKon
- Infinite
- IU
- Lovelyz
- Mamamoo
- Monsta X
- PSY
- Red Velvet
- Seventeen
- Shinee
- Girls' Generation
- T-ara
- Twice
- UP10TION
- VIXX
- Wonder Girls

=== 2016: K-POP A-Z ===
2016's Gayo Daejeon took place on 26 December at COEX Hall. It was hosted by You Hee-yeol, Yuri of Girls' Generation, and Baekhyun of Exo. The theme was "K-Pop A-Z".

Performers:

- SF9
- VIXX
- WJSN
- Laboum
- DIA
- Twice
- Soy Luna
- Juanes
- CNCO
- Blackpink
- CNBLUE
- Bebe Rexha
- Seventeen
- Gugudan
- NCT 127
- Red Velvet
- Got7
- Momoland
- BTS
- Lovelyz
- Bruno Mars
- S.E.S. (group)
- Monsta X
- CLC
- KNK
- After School
- Shinee
- Martin Garrix
- Day6
- Sistar
- Snuper,
- Operación Triunfo
- HALO
- Oh My Girl
- Astro
- BewhY
- Ah-yeon
- Exo,
- Karol Sevilla,
- BtoB
- Super Junior
- HyunA
- Ailee
- AOA (group)
- Sunny Girls
- Apink
- EXID
- CL
- Mamamoo
- Infinite
- G-Dragon
- Kai
List of musical performances

No	Alphabet	Note	Artist	Song
1	O	O-Pening Show	Shin Jiho, Henry Lau (Super Junior M), Raina (After School), Benji (B.I.G)	Spring Breeze (Orchestra Performance)
1	O	O-Pening Show	Yiruma, N (VIXX), Jimin (BTS), Yein (Lovelyz), Mina (Twice), Momo (Twice), Chengxiao (WJSN)	Piano By Yiruma (Ballad Performance)
1	O	O-Pening Show	Kim Dokyung, Jonghyun (CNBLUE), Young K (Day6), Ah-yeon	By The (Rock Performance)
1	O	O-Pening Show	Jinyoung (Got7), Yugyeom (Got7), TEN (NCT), Seulgi (Red Velvet), YooA (Oh My Girl), Eunjin (DIA), Lisa (Blackpink)	24K Magic (Street Dance Performance)
1	O	O-Pening Show	Taemin (Shinee)	Drip Drop
1	O	O-Pening Show	N (VIXX), Jimin (BTS), Yein (Lovelyz), Mina (Twice), Momo (Twice), Chengxiao (WJSN), Jinyoung (Got7), Yugyeom (Got7), TEN (NCT), Seulgi (Red Velvet), YooA (Oh My Girl), Eunjin (DIA), Lisa (Blackpink)	In The Name of Love
2	N	N-ew Generation	NCT Dream	Chewing Gum
2	N	N-ew Generation	NCT U	Dance Performance, 7th Sense
2	N	N-ew Generation	NCT 127	Firetruck, Outro (Limitless)
2	N	N-ew Generation	Blackpink	Whistle, Playing With Fire
2	N	N-ew Generation	Monsta X	All In
2	N	N-ew Generation	Lovelyz	Destiny
2	N	N-ew Generation	Seventeen	Into The New World (SNSD) + U-Go Girl (Lee Hyori) + I'm Your Girl (S.E.S) + BOOM BOOM
3	T	T-he Sunny Girls	Sunny Girls (Eunha (GFriend), Chengxiao (WJSN), Nancy (Momoland), YooA (Oh My Girl), Nayoung (Gugudan))	Taxi
4	U	U-ltra Dance Festival	Momoland, gu9udan, WJSN, DIA, CLC, Laboum	Jjang Kkoong Kkang (Momoland)
4	U	U-ltra Dance Festival	Momoland, gu9udan, WJSN, DIA, CLC, Laboum	Wonderland (gu9udan)
4	U	U-ltra Dance Festival	Momoland, gu9udan, WJSN, DIA, CLC, Laboum	Secret (WJSN)
4	U	U-ltra Dance Festival	Momoland, gu9udan, WJSN, DIA, CLC, Laboum	Mr. Potter (DIA)
4	U	U-ltra Dance Festival	Momoland, gu9udan, WJSN, DIA, CLC, Laboum	No Oh No (CLC)
4	U	U-ltra Dance Festival	Momoland, gu9udan, WJSN, DIA, CLC, Laboum	Winter Story (Laboum)
4	U	U-ltra Dance Festival	Pentagon, SF9, KNK, Astro, Snuper, HALO	Can You Feel It (Pentagon)
4	U	U-ltra Dance Festival	Pentagon, SF9, KNK, Astro, Snuper, HALO	Fanfare (SF9)
4	U	U-ltra Dance Festival	Pentagon, SF9, KNK, Astro, Snuper, HALO	KNOCK (KNK)
4	U	U-ltra Dance Festival	Pentagon, SF9, KNK, Astro, Snuper, HALO	Confession (Astro)
4	U	U-ltra Dance Festival	Pentagon, SF9, KNK, Astro, Snuper, HALO	It's Raining (SNUPER)
4	U	U-ltra Dance Festival	Pentagon, SF9, KNK, Astro, Snuper, HALO	Mariya (HALO)
5	A	A-coustic Stage (Produced by 10cm)	10 cm, Jihyo (Twice), Rosé (Blackpink), Chanyeol (Exo)	What The Spring??
5	A	A-coustic Stage (Produced by 10cm)	10 cm, Jihyo (Twice), Rosé (Blackpink), Chanyeol (Exo)	Whistle (BLACKPINK)
5	A	A-coustic Stage (Produced by 10cm)	10 cm, Jihyo (Twice), Rosé (Blackpink), Chanyeol (Exo)	TT (Twice)
5	A	A-coustic Stage (Produced by 10cm)	10 cm, Jihyo (Twice), Rosé (Blackpink), Chanyeol (Exo)	Monster (Exo)
5	A	A-coustic Stage (Produced by 10cm)	10 cm, Jihyo (Twice), Rosé (Blackpink), Chanyeol (Exo)	Sseudam Sseudam
6	Y	Y-outh	Got7	Fly + Hard Carry
6	Y	Y-outh	VIXX	The God of Domination + The Chaser
6	Y	Y-outh	BtoB	I'll Be Your Man
7	G	G-irl Crush	Mamamoo	You're The Best + Delcacomanie
7	G	G-irl Crush	Ailee (feat. Heritage Mass Choir)	If You
7	G	G-irl Crush	HyunA	How's This (REMIX) Hyuna
8	F	F-antastic K-pop	Jung Seung-hwan	This Fool
8	F	F-antastic K-pop	Lee Hi	Breathe
8	F	F-antastic K-pop	Baek Ah-yeon	So-So
8	F	F-antastic K-pop	Yang Hee-eun, Lee Hi, Baek Ah-yeon	Whats up? We Love So
8	F	F-antastic K-pop	Yang Hee-eun	Evergreen
9	H	H-ip Hop Stage (Produced by Teddy)	Okasian	Underwater Bank
9	H	H-ip Hop Stage (Produced by Teddy)	BewhY	Shalom
9	H	H-ip Hop Stage (Produced by Teddy)	CL	Lifted
9	H	H-ip Hop Stage (Produced by Teddy)	G-Dragon	One of a Kind
9	H	H-ip Hop Stage (Produced by Teddy)	Okasian, BewhY, CL, G-Dragon	1,000,000 ₩ (One Million Won)
10	B	B-allad Stage (Produced by Yoon Jong-shin)	Jung Eun-ji	Hopefully Sky
10	B	B-allad Stage (Produced by Yoon Jong-shin)	Kim Se-jeong	Flower Way
10	B	B-allad Stage (Produced by Yoon Jong-shin)	Cho Kyu-hyun	Blah Blah
10	B	B-allad Stage (Produced by Yoon Jong-shin)	Cho Kyu-hyun & Yook Sung-jae (BtoB)	You Touched My Heart
10	B	B-allad Stage (Produced by Yoon Jong-shin)	Eddy Kim, Kim Se-jeong, Jung Eun-ji	Exhaustion + Uphill
10	B	B-allad Stage (Produced by Yoon Jong-shin)	Yoon Jong-shin	Still Christmas
11	S	S-yndrome	Twice	TT + Cheer Up (Note: A technical glitch happened when the intro accidentally played Gfriend's intro Instead of Twice's intro)
11	S	S-yndrome	GFriend	Navillera + Rough
11	S	S-yndrome	Red Velvet	One of These Nights + Russian Roulette
12	M	M-use	EXID	L.I.E
12	M	M-use	AOA	Good Luck
12	M	M-use	Apink	Only One + Cause You're My Star
13	L	L-egend of K-POP	Uhm Junghwa	Watch Me Move + Dreamer + Rose of Betrayal + D.I.S.C.O (Feat T.O.P)
13	L	L-egend of K-POP	Sechskies	Chivalry (2016 ver.), Couple (2016 ver.)
14	D	D-ance Stage (Produced by J.Y Park)	Got7 (JB, Yugyeom, Jinyoung, Jackson)	It's Raining (Rain)
14	D	D-ance Stage (Produced by J.Y Park)	Seventeen (Woozi, Seungkwan, Vernon, Dino)	Friday Night (g.o.d)
14	D	D-ance Stage (Produced by J.Y Park)	Got7 (JB, Yugyeom, Jinyoung, Jackson), Seventeen (Woozi, Seungkwan, Vernon, Dino)	Don't Leave Me (J.Y. Park)
14	D	D-ance Stage (Produced by J.Y Park)	GFriend (SinB, Yuju, Umji, Yerin)	Bad Girl Good Girl (Miss A)
14	D	D-ance Stage (Produced by J.Y Park)	Twice (Momo, Nayeon, Mina, Jeongyeon)	24 Hours (Sunmi)
14	D	D-ance Stage (Produced by J.Y Park)	GFriend (SinB, Yuju, Umji, Yerin), Twice (Momo, Nayeon, Mina, Jeongyeon)	Tell Me (Wonder Girls)
14	D	D-ance Stage (Produced by J.Y Park)	Got7 (JB, Yugyeom, Jinyoung, Jackson), Seventeen (Woozi, Seungkwan, Vernon, Dino), GFriend (SinB, Yuju, Umji, Yerin), Twice (Momo, Nayeon, Mina, Jeongyeon)	Who's Your Mama (orig by J.Y Park & Jessi)
15	W	W-orld Wide	Taeyeon	11:11
15	W	W-orld Wide	CNBLUE	You're So Fine
15	W	W-orld Wide	Sistar	I Like That
15	W	W-orld Wide	Infinite	The Eye
16	C	C-limax	BTS	Intro (RM & Jin) + Blood Sweat & Tears + Fire
16	C	C-limax	Kai (Exo)	Dance Break
16	C	C-limax	Exo	Monster
16	C	C-limax	Kai (Exo), Sehun (Exo)	Dance Break
16	C	C-limax	SHINee	Prism + Tell Me What To Do
17	P	P-rogressive Stage (Produced by Yoo Young-jin)	NCT 2016	Back on Black
17	P	P-rogressive Stage (Produced by Yoo Young-jin)	NCT-127	Wolf & Sheep of 2016 (orig by H.O.T)
17	P	P-rogressive Stage (Produced by Yoo Young-jin)	Exo	MAMA (Heavy Metal Ver.)
18	V	V-IP BigBang	BigBang	Last Dance + Fxxk It + Bang! Bang! Bang!

=== 2017: Number One ===
2017's Gayo Daejeon took place on 25 December at Gocheok Sky Dome. It was hosted by You Hee-yeol & IU. The theme was "Number One", and featured all artists who placed number 1 in the charts. There were special stages and collaborations throughout the show.

Performers:

- Heize
- IU
- Lee Juck
- Sunmi
- Uhm Jung-hwa
- You Hee-yeol
- Blackpink
- BtoB
- BTS
- Exo
- GFriend
- Got7
- NCT 127
- Red Velvet
- Twice
- Wanna One
- Winner
List of musical performances

Song	Artist	Original Singer
Butterfly	Sungjae (BtoB), Yuju (GFriend), Jihyo (Twice), Rosé (Blackpink), Jaehwan (Wanna One)	Loveholic
Hey Come On!	Got7 (Jinyoung, BamBam, Yugyeom), NCT-127 (Taeyong, Yuta, and Doyoung)	Shinhwa
My Love by My Side (내 사랑 내 곁에)	IU, Yoo Hee Yeol	Kim Hyun Suk
Poison (FRANTS REMIX)	Uhm Jung Hwa, Sunmi	Uhm Jung Hwa
Now	Twice (Nayeon, Dahyun, Mina, Momo)	Fin.K.L
We Are The Future	WANNA ONE (Sungwoon, Kang Daniel, Jisung, Minhyun, and Seongwoo)	H.O.T
Snail (달팽이)	Lee Juck, Heize	Panic
Haru Haru (하루 하루)	Winner	Big Bang
So Hot (BLACKLABEL REMIX)	Blackpink	Wonder Girls

Butterfly was sung as promotion for the 2018 PyeongChang Winter Olympics.

=== 2018: The Wave ===
2018's Gayo Daejeon took place on 25 December at Gocheok Sky Dome. It was hosted by Jun Hyun-moo and Jo Bo-ah. The theme was "The Wave". On 16 December 2018 episode of Inkigayo, a teaser video revealed two special stages, a collaboration between NCT, Wanna One, Seventeen, Winner, and Got7, and a collaboration between Red Velvet and Twice.

Performers:

- Sunmi
- (G)I-dle
- Apink
- Blackpink
- BtoB
- BTS
- Exo
- GFriend
- Got7
- IKon
- Mamamoo
- Momoland
- Monsta X
- NCT
- Red Velvet
- Seventeen
- Stray Kids
- The Boyz
- Twice
- Wanna One
- Winner

=== 2019: Touch ===
2019's Gayo Daejeon took place on 25 December at Gocheok Sky Dome. It was hosted by Jun Hyun-moo and Seolhyun.

Performers:

- Chungha
- AOA
- Apink
- Astro
- BTS
- GFriend
- Got7
- Itzy
- Mamamoo
- Monsta X
- N.Flying
- NCT 127
- NCT Dream
- NU'EST
- Oh My Girl
- Seventeen
- Stray Kids
- Twice
- Tomorrow X Together

Red Velvet was originally scheduled to perform but had to cancel after Wendy was injured (and subsequently hospitalized) during her solo rehearsal.

=== 2020: The Wonder Year ===
2020's Gayo Daejeon took place on 25 December in Daegu. It was hosted by Boom, Heechul and Na Eun. Due to COVID-19 restrictions, '2020 SBS Gayo Daejeon in DAEGU' was a pre-recorded event.

Performers:

- BTS
- Twice
- Seventeen
- Got7
- Monsta X
- Mamamoo
- Jessi
- NU'EST
- GFriend
- Oh My Girl
- Iz*One
- The Boyz
- Stray Kids
- (G)I-dle
- Ateez
- Itzy
- Tomorrow X Together
- April
- Momoland
- Cravity
- Treasure
- Aespa
- Enhypen
- Uhm Jung-hwa
- Lee Juck
List of musical performances

List of musical performances
Artist(s)	Song(s)

=== 2021: Welcome ===
2021's Gayo Daejeon, themed "Welcome", took place on 25 December at Incheon. It was hosted by Boom, Shinee's Key, and Itzy's Yuna, and broadcast live at Namdong Gymnasium from 18:00 (KST).

Performers:

- Key (Shinee)
- NU'EST
- Red Velvet
- Oh My Girl
- Brave Girls
- NCT 127
- NCT Dream
- Astro
- The Boyz
- Stray Kids
- Ateez
- Itzy
- Tomorrow X Together
- Aespa
- STAYC
- Enhypen
- Ive
- Woodz
- Yoo Tae-yang (SF9)
- Minnie ((G)I-dle)
- Lee Chae-yeon
- Simon Dominic
- Gray
- Loco
- Lee Hi
List of musical performances

Artist	Song
Part 1
All performers (Note: Wendy (Red Velvet), Bang Chan and Seungmin (Stray Kids), Hyojung and Seunghee (Oh My Girl), Doyoung, Jaehyun and Mark (NCT), Ningning and Winter (Aespa), Lia and Chaeryeong (Itzy), Jungwon and Sunoo (Enhypen), Aron, JR and Ren (NU'EST), Minyoung Brave Girls, Subin, Yeonjun and Taehyun (Tomorrow X Together), Hongjoong and San (Ateez), Moonbin and Cha Eun-woo (Astro), Younghoon and New (The Boyz), and Yujin and Wonyoung (Ive))	"All I Want for Christmas Is You" (Mariah Carey)
Ive	"Eleven"
STAYC	"Stereotype" "ASAP" (remix)
Enhypen	"Just a Little Bit" (carol version) "Tamed-Dashed"
Aespa	"Next Level" "Savage"
Brave Girls	"We Ride" (piano version) "Rollin'" (new version) "Chi Mat Ba Ram"
Astro	"One"
Minnie ((G)I-dle); Lee Chae-yeon; Ryujin (Itzy); Isa (STAYC)	"Fiction" (Beast)
Itzy	"In the Morning" "Sorry Not Sorry"
Tomorrow X Together	"Magic Castle" (TVXQ) "0X1=Lovesong (I Know I Love You)"
Simon Dominic; Loco	"No Break"
Gray; Lee Hi	"Party for the Night"
Lee Hi	"Red Lipstick"
Simon Dominic; Loco; Gray; Lee Hi	"Santa Claus Is Coming to Town" (AOMG mix)
Part 2
Ateez	"White Love" (Turbo)
Boom; Key (Shinee); Yuna (Itzy)	"Happy Christmas" (Country Kko Kko)
Seulgi (Red Velvet); Yeri (Red Velvet); Taeil (NCT); Haechan (NCT); Chenle (NCT)	"Waiting for White Christmas" (SM Town)
Joy (Red Velvet)	"My Lips Warm like Coffee" (S#arp)
Changbin (Stray Kids); Han (Stray Kids); Felix (Stray Kids); Seungmin (Stray Kids); I.N (Stray Kids)	"Merry Christmas Ahead" (IU featuring Thunder)
YooA (Oh My Girl); Jiho (Oh My Girl); Binnie (Oh My Girl); Sangyeon (The Boyz); Hyunjae (The Boyz); Haknyeon (The Boyz)	"Must Have Love" (SG Wannabe and Brown Eyed Girls)
Ateez	"Deja Vu" "The Real" (Heung version)
The Boyz	"Maverick" "Thrill Ride"
Stray Kids	"Winter Falls" "Thunderous" (Christmas version)
Oh My Girl	"Who Comes Who Knows" "Dun Dun Dance"
NU'EST	"Dress" "Inside Out"
Wendy (Red Velvet)	"When This Rain Stops"
Joy (Red Velvet)	"Hello"
Red Velvet	"Queendom"
Key (Shinee)	"Helium" "Bad Love"
Moonbin (Astro); Yoo Tae-yang (SF9); Juyeon (The Boyz); Hyunjin (Stray Kids); Woodz	"Mirotic" (TVXQ)
NCT U	"Universe (Let's Play Ball)"
NCT Dream	"Hot Sauce"
NCT 127	"Sticker"

=== 2022: The Live Shout Out ===
2022's Gayo Daejeon was held on 24 December 2022, and was hosted by SHINee's Key, Astro's Cha Eun-woo and Ive's An Yu-jin. It was broadcast live at Gocheok Sky Dome from 19:30 (KST).

Performers:

- 10cm
- Aespa
- Ateez
- The Boyz
- Cha Jun-hwan
- Cravity
- Enhypen
- Fromis 9
- (G)I-dle
- Itzy
- Ive
- Jaurim
- Le Sserafim
- NCT 127
- NCT Dream
- NewJeans
- Nmixx
- Stray Kids
- Tempest
- Tomorrow X Together
- Younha
List of musical performances

List of musical performances
Artist(s)	Song(s)
Part 1
Younha	"Event Horizon"
Younha; Minnie ((G)I-dle); Yuqi ((G)I-dle)	"Comet"
Nmixx	"O.O" + "Tank"
Tempest	"Dragon"
NewJeans	"Attention"
Le Sserafim	"Fearless"
Yeonjun (Tomorrow X Together)	"Zoom" (Jessi cover) "Shut Down" (Blackpink cover) "Run BTS" (BTS cover)
The Boyz (Note: Juyeon, Kevin, Q, Ju Hak-nyeon, and Sunwoo)	"Hot" (Seventeen cover)
Ateez (Note: Hongjoong, Yunho, Yeosang, San, and Mingi)	"Rush Hour" (Crush cover)
Cravity	"Groove Back" (J.Y. Park cover) "Hype Boy" (NewJeans cover)
The Boyz; Ateez; Yeonjun; Cravity	"That That" (Psy cover)
Enhypen	"Dope" (BTS cover) "ParadoXXX Invasion"
Doyoung (NCT); Ningning (Aespa)	"Happy Together" (Park Ji-heon and Kang Min-kyung cover)
Stray Kids	"24 to 25"
NCT Dream	"Graduation" "Joy"
Part 2
Ive	"After Like" (ballad version) "Love Dive"
Aespa	"Illusion" "Girls"
Lia (Itzy)	"Love, Maybe" (MeloMance cover)
10cm	"Christmas Tree" (V cover) "Drawer"
Cravity	"Party Rock" (winter version)
Tomorrow X Together	"DNA" "Good Boy Gone Bad"
Fromis 9	"DM" "Rewind"
Itzy	"Cheshire" "What I Want"
Sunghoon (Enhypen); Cha Jun-hwan	"Black Swan"
Ateez	"New World" "Guerilla"
(G)I-dle	"Villain Dies" "Tomboy"
Part 3
Stray Kids	"Christmas EveL" "Case 143"
NewJeans	"Tell Me" (Wonder Girls cover)
Ive	"Pretty Girl" (Kara cover)
Le Sserafim	"The Boys" (Girls' Generation cover)
Nmixx	"How You Like That" (Blackpink cover)
The Boyz (Note: Jacob, Younghoon, and Hyunjae)	"17171771" (Jaurim cover)
Jaurim; The Boyz	"Hey Hey Hey"
Jaurim	"Mister Klauss" "If It Snows on Christmas Day"
NCT Dream	"Glitch Mode" "Candy"
NCT 127	"Faster" "2 Baddies"
All performers	"All I Want for Christmas Is You" (Mariah Carey cover)

=== 2023: Switch On ===
2023's Gayo Daejeon was held on 25 December 2023, broadcast live from Inspire Arena, Incheon. It was hosted by SHINee's Key, Ive's An Yu-jin and TXT's Yeonjun.

Performers:

- &TEAM
- Aespa
- Ateez
- BoyNextDoor
- Cravity
- Enhypen
- Fromis 9
- (G)I-dle
- Itzy
- Ive
- Le Sserafim
- NCT 127
- NCT Dream
- NewJeans
- NiziU
- Nmixx
- Riize
- STAYC
- SHINee
- Stray Kids
- The Boyz
- Tomorrow X Together
- TVXQ
- xikers
- Zerobaseone
List of musical performances

Artist	Song
Part 1
NCT (Note: Doyoung, Xiaojun, and Chenle)	"믿어요 (I Believe)" (TVXQ)
aespa	"주문 - Mirotic" (TVXQ)
TVXQ	"Rebel"
Zerobaseone	"Crush" (가시)
BoyNextDoor	"One and Only"
Riize	"Get A Guitar" "Memories"
n.SSign	"Wormhole"
xikers	"DO or DIE"
Nmixx	"Funky Glitter Christmas" "Love Me Like This"
STAYC	"Teddy Bear"
NiziU	"HEARTRIS" (Christmas version)
&TEAM	"Firework" (Korean version)
Yuna (Itzy)	"You & Me" (Jennie)
Yeonjun (Tomorrow X Together)	"3D" (Alternate version) (Jungkook)
Part 2
NCT 127	"Be There For Me"
Stray Kids (Note: Seungmin and I.N)	"괜찮아도 괜찮아 (That's Okay)" (D.O.)
NewJeans	"New Jeans" "Ditto" "OMG" (FRNK Remix version)
Cravity	"Groovy" (Christmas version)
fromis 9	"Attitude" (Remix version)
Le Sserafim	"Eve, Psyche & the Bluebeard's Wife" "Perfect Night" (Holiday Remix version)
Ive	"Off the Record" "I AM" "Baddie"
aespa	"Drama"
Enhypen	"Still Monster" "Sweet Venom"
Tomorrow X Together	"Sugar Rush Ride" "Chasing That Feeling" (Holiday version)
Itzy	"Kill Shot" "Cake"
The Boyz	"Watch It"
Ateez	"Crazy Form"
Part 3
SHINee	"Sherlock (Clue + Note)" "Hard"
(G)I-dle	"Queencard" (Christmas version)
Taesan (BoyNextDoor); Sung Han-bin (Zerobaseone); Anton (Riize)	"Jingle Bell"
&TEAM	"I'm Your Boy" (S.E.S)
Riize	"엉뚱한 상상 (Odd Imagination)" (Jinu - Hitchhiker)
BoyNextDoor	"White" (Fin.K.L)
Zerobaseone	"Couple" (Sechs Kies)
BoyNextDoor; Zerobaseone; Riize &TEAM	"Miracle" (Super Junior)
Stray Kids	"Battle Ground" (Korean version) "Lalalala" "Megaverse"
NCT U	"Baggy Jeans"
NCT Dream	"SOS" "ISTJ"
NCT 127	"영웅 (英雄; Kick It)" "Fact Check" (불가사의; 不可思議)
All performers	"We Wish You a Merry Christmas"

=== 2024: Summer & Winter ===
Different from previous years, 2024's Gayo Daejeon would be split into two parts based on summer and winter seasons.

==== Summer: New Generation K-pop ====
The summer edition was held on 21 July 2024, at Inspire Arena, Incheon. It was hosted by NCT's Doyoung, Tomorrow X Together's Yeonjun and Ive's An Yu-jin.

Performers:

- Cravity
- Enhypen
- (G)I-dle
- Illit
- Ive
- Jannabi
- Kiss of Life
- Le Sserafim
- Lee Young-ji
- NCT 127
- NCT Wish
- NewJeans
- Nmixx
- ONF
- STAYC
- Stray Kids
- Tomorrow X Together
- Wooah
- Xikers
- Zerobaseone
List of musical performances

Artist	Song
Part 1
Jannabi	"Together!"
NCT Wish	"Songbird"
Wooah	"Blush"
Illit	"Lucky Girl Syndrome" "Magnetic" (Festival version)
Kiss of Life	"Sticky"
Xikers	"Red Sun" (Spooky version)
Cravity	"Love or Die" (Summer Special version)
ONF	"Bye My Monster"
Zerobaseone	"Sunday Ride" "Sweat"
Nmixx	"Soñar (Breaker)" "Dash"
Lee Young-ji	"16 (Intro)" "Small Girl" "Tell Me!"
Kim Tae-rae (Zerobaseone); Park Gun-wook (Zerobaseone)	"Prince of the Sea" (Park Myung-soo cover)
Illit (Note: Wonhee didn't participate due to injury.)	"Plot Twist" (TWS cover)
NCT Wish	"Eusha! Eusha!" (Shinhwa cover)
NewJeans	"How Sweet" "Supernatural"
STAYC	"1 Thing" "Cheeky Icy Thang"
Lee Young-ji; Natty (Kiss of Life)	"Please Me" (Cardi B and Bruno Mars cover) "Finesse" (Bruno Mars featuring Cardi B cover)
Yeonjun (Tomorrow X Together); Soobin (Tomorrow X Together)	"The Killa (I Belong to You)"
Le Sserafim	"Easy" (Drum & Bass remix) "Smart" (Festival House remix)
Jannabi; Miyeon ((G)I-dle); Minnie ((G)I-dle)	"Summer"
Ive	"Heya" "Accendio"
Enhypen	"XO (Only If You Say Yes)" "Fatal Trouble"
Tomorrow X Together (Note: Beomgyu didn't participate due to injury.)	"Deja Vu" "I'll See You There Tomorrow" (Summer version)
(G)I-dle	"Klaxon" (Summer version)
Stray Kids	"Maniac" "Chk Chk Boom" "Hall of Fame"
NCT 127	"Fact Check" "On the Beat" "Walk"
All performers	"Believe It" (Louis the Child and Madeon cover)

==== Winter: Merry Music ====
The winter edition was held on 25 December 2024, at Inspire Arena, Incheon. It was hosted by NCT's Doyoung, Tomorrow X Together's Yeonjun and Ive's An Yu-jin.

Performers:

- 2NE1
- Aespa
- Ateez
- Babymonster
- BoyNextDoor
- Cravity
- Enhypen
- G-Dragon (BigBang)
- (G)I-dle
- Illit
- Itzy
- Ive
- Izna
- Key (Shinee)
- Le Sserafim
- Lee Young-ji
- NCT 127
- NCT Dream
- NCT Wish
- NewJeans
- Nexz
- Nmixx
- Riize
- Stray Kids
- Tomorrow X Together
- Treasure
- TWS
- WayV
- Zerobaseone
List of musical performances

Artist	Song
Part 2
Lee Young-ji	"All I Want for Christmas Is You" (Mariah Carey cover) "Not Sorry"
Izna	"Izna" (Christmas version)
Nexz	"Nallina" (Christmas version)
Babymonster	"Drip"
Illit	"IYKYK (If You Know You Know)" "Magnetic" (Holiday version)
NCT Wish	"Steady" (Christmas version)
TWS	"Plot Twist" (Holiday version)
Cravity	"Now or Never" (Christmas Fear version)
WayV	"Frequency (Korean Ver.)"
Riize	"Love 119" (Christmas version)
Nmixx	"Dash" "See That?" (Christmas Remix version)
BoyNextDoor	"It's Beginning to Look a Lot Like Christmas" (Bing Crosby cover) "Nice Guy" (Carol version)
Zerobaseone	"Road Movie" "Good So Bad"
Yeonjun (Tomorrow X Together)	"Ggum"
Doyoung (NCT)	"Little Light"
NewJeans	"Ditto" (250 remix) "Cookie" "Hype Boy"
Le Sserafim	"Crazy"
Sullyoon (Nmixx)	"Feel My Rhythm" (Red Velvet cover)
Iroha (Illit)	"Siren" (Riize cover)
Heeseung (Enhypen)	"Swan Lake Reimagined"
Yunho (Ateez)	"Steps to Oz"
Woonhak (BoyNextDoor); Han Yu-jin (Zerobaseone); Jihoon (TWS); Kyungmin (TWS); Ryo (NCT); Sakuya (NCT)	"Love Me Right" (Exo cover)
Treasure	"Last Night"
Ive	"Eleven" "Love Dive" "After Like" "Kitsch" "I Am" "Baddie" "Heya" "Ive Empathy" (Note: Snippet of their upcoming song from Ive Empathy)
Aespa	"Pink Hoodie" "Supernova"
Enhypen	"XO (Only If You Say Yes)" (Carol version) "Brought the Heat Back" (Short version)
Itzy	"Imaginary Friend" "Mr. Vampire" (Horror Christmas version)
Ateez	"Ice on My Teeth"
2NE1	"Come Back Home" "Fire" "I Don't Care" "Ugly" "I Am the Best"
Key (Shinee)	"Pleasure Shop"
Tomorrow X Together	"Forty One Winks" "Over The Moon" (Holiday version)
(G)I-dle	"Wife" "Klaxon" (Christmas version)
Sungchan (Riize); Anton (Riize)	"Show Me Your Love" (TVXQ, Super Junior cover)
Kim Ji-woong (Zerobaseone); Park Gun-wook (Zerobaseone)	"Shoot Out" (Monsta X cover)
Karina (Aespa); An Yu-jin (Ive)	"Killer" (Valerie Broussard cover)
Stray Kids	"Walkin on Water" "Mountains"
NCT Dream	"Smoothie" "When I'm With You" (Holiday version)
NCT (Note: Jungwoo, Jaemin, Xiaojun, and Sion)	"Steady" "Give Me That" "Smoothie" "Walk" "Black on Black"
NCT 127	"Fire Truck" "Walk" (EDM version)
G-Dragon (BigBang)	"Power" "Sober" (BigBang cover) "Crooked"

=== 2025: Summer & Winter ===
2025's Gayo Daejeon will also be split into two parts, based on summer and winter seasons, like the previous year.

==== Summer: NOL Festival - SBS Gayo Daejeon Summer ====
SBS and online platform NOL will collaborate for this summer edition, and was held on 26–27 July 2025, at the Korea International Exhibition Center, Ilsanseo District, Goyang. It was hosted by NCT's Doyoung, Tomorrow X Together's Yeonjun and Ive's An Yu-jin.

Performers:

Day 1 (26 July 2025)

- AHOF
- AllDay Project
- Be First
- Doyoung (NCT)
- Ive
- Itzy
- Izna
- Jannabi
- Meovv
- NCT 127
- NCT Wish
- Nmixx
- Paul Kim
- Uspeer
- Xikers

Unipop Lineup

- Cherry Filter
- Dragon Pony
- Nam Woo-hyun (Infinite)
- Paul Kim
- Sam Kim
- Solar (Mamamoo)
- YdBB
- Yoari

Day 2 (27 July 2025)

- Baby Dont Cry
- Babymonster
- Close Your Eyes
- Enhypen
- Hearts2Hearts
- HITGS
- I-dle
- Idid
- Illit
- KickFlip
- KiiiKiii
- Mark (NCT)
- NCT Dream
- STAYC
- Tomorrow X Together
- Woodz

Unipop Lineup

- Daybreak
- Jin Hyo-jeong
- KIK
- Kwon Jin-ah
- Lucy
- Na Yoon-kwon
- Nerd Connection
- Paul Blanco
- Touched
List of musical performances

Artist	Song
Day 1
Izna	"Genie" (Girls' Generation cover)
Meovv	"3!4!" (Roo'ra cover)
NCT Wish	"Listen to My Word (A-ing)" (Papaya cover)
Be First	"Grit" "Milli-Billi" "Muchu" (Piano Ver.)
Uspeer	"Zoom"
AHOF	"Rendezvous"
AllDay Project	"Famous"
Xikers	"Breathe"
Jannabi	"Flash" "Pony"
Izna	"Beep"
Meovv	"Hands Up"
NCT Wish	"Poppop" "Dunk Shot"
Paul Kim; Lia (Itzy)	"Rain"
Choi Jung-hoon (Jannabi); Liz (Ive)	"Our Night Is More Beautiful Than Your Day" (Kona cover)
Nmixx	"Know About Me"
Doyoung (NCT)	"Memory" "Be My Light"
Ive	"Rebel Heart" "Attitude"
Itzy	"Girls Will Be Girls" "Kiss & Tell" "Sneakers"
NCT 127	"Gas" "Far" "2 Baddies" "Fact Check"
Day 2
Woodz	"Drowning"
Idid	"Step It Up"
Baby Dont Cry	"F Girl"
Hitgs	"Charizzma"
KickFlip	"Freeze"
KiiiKiii; Hearts2Hearts	"Birth of a Star: Twinkle Twins"
KiiiKiii	"Dancing Alone"
Hearts2Hearts	"Style"
Jake (Enhypen)	"Watermelon Sugar" (Harry Styles cover)
Beomgyu (Tomorrow X Together)	"Panic"
Yuqi (I-dle)	"Don't Start Now" (Dua Lipa cover)
Babymonster	"Drip" "Hot Sauce" "Sheesh"
Illit	"Do the Dance" "Jellyous"
STAYC	"I Want It"
Mark (NCT)	"1999" "Righteous"
Enhypen	"Bad Desire (With Or Without You)" "Helium"
I-dle	"Good Thing" "Fate"
Tomorrow X Together	"Beautiful Strangers" "Upside Down Kiss" "Love Language"
NCT Dream	"BTTF" "Chiller" "Hello Future"

==== Winter: Golden Loop ====
The winter edition was held on 25 December 2025, at the Inspire Arena, Incheon. It will be hosted by Day6's Young K, NCT's Jaemin and Ive's An Yu-jin.

Performers:

- &Team
- Aespa
- AHOF
- AllDay Project
- Ateez
- AxMxP
- Baby Dont Cry
- Babymonster
- BoyNextDoor
- Cortis
- Enhypen
- Hearts2Hearts
- HITGS
- Idid
- Illit
- Itzy
- Ive
- Izna
- KickFlip
- KiiiKiii
- Le Sserafim
- Meovv
- NCT Dream
- NCT Wish
- Nexz
- Nmixx
- Riize
- Skinz
- Stray Kids
- Taeyong (NCT)
- The Boyz
- Tomorrow X Together
- Treasure
- TWS
- U-Know Yunho (TVXQ)
- Zerobaseone
List of musical performances

Artist	Song
Idid	"Push Back" (Ice Breaking version)
Yeonjun	"Let Me Tell You" (feat.Yoonchae of Katseye) "Talk to You"
AxMxP	"I Did It"
AHOF	"Pinocchio"
Baby Dont Cry	"I Dont Care"
HITGS	"Sourpatch" "Happy" "A-HA!"
SKINZ	"Why U Mad"
Cortis	"Jingle Bell Rock" (Bobby Helms cover)
Woonhak (BoyNextDoor); Wonhee (Illit)	"Merry Christmas Ahead" (IU cover)
HueningKai (TXT); Zhang Hao (Zerobaseone); Sohee (Riize; Shinyu (TWS)	"You Were Beautiful" (Day6 cover) (Winter version)
Young K (Day6)	"Bring Me Love" (John Legend cover)
KiiiKiii	"I Do Me" x "XOXZ" (Mash Up version)
Hearts2Hearts	"Focus" x "Dirty Work" (Mash Up version)
KickFlip	"My First Love Song" (Christmas Medley) x "Dream Bus" (Mash Up version)
Cortis	"Go!"
AllDay Project	"Look at Me"
Izna	"Mamma Mia"
Meovv	"Toxic" "Burning Up" (Rush Remix)
TWS	"Freestyle" "Overdrive"
Nexz	"Beat-Boxer" (Christmas version)
&Team	"Mismatch" (Christmas version)
Illit	"Not Cute Anymore" "Jellyous"
Babymonster	"We Go Up" "Psycho"
NCT Wish	"Surf" (Christmas version) "Color"
Zerobaseone	"Iconik"
Riize	"Fame"
Leeseo (Ive); Kyujin (Nmixx); Hong Eun-chae (Le Sserafim)	"Pretty Savage" (Blackpink cover)
BoyNextDoor	"If I Say, I Love You" "123-78" (Carol version)
Taeyong	"NEO-ISM" "Shalala"
Nmixx	"Blue Valentine" (Christmas version)
Le Sserafim	"Spaghetti"
Ive	"Flu" "Rebel Heart" (Christmas version)
NCT Wish	"TT" (Twice cover)
Woochan (AllDay Project)	"Home Alone"
Sunwoo (The Boyz)	"Love Comes Two Steps Behind"
Haruto (Treasure)	"12:25 AM"
Chaeryeong (Itzy)	"Espresso" (Sabrina Carpenter cover)
Jungwon (Enhypen)	"A Christmas Nightmare"
U-know (TVXQ)	"Thank U" "Stretch"
Aespa	"Rich Man"
Treasure	"Paradise" (Remix) "Run" (Band version)
Itzy	"Tunnel Vision"
TXT	"Upside Down Kiss" "Danger"
The Boyz	"VVV"
Ateez	"Magical Fantasy" "Wonderland (Symphony No.9 “From The Wonderland”)"
Stray Kids	"Do It" "Ceremony"
NCT Dream	"Chiller" "Beat It Up"

=== 2026: Summer & Winter ===
2026's Gayo Daejeon will also be split into two parts, based on summer and winter seasons, similar to the previous two years.

==== Summer: 2026 Gayo Daejeon Summer ====
The 2026 Gayo Daejeon Summer was held on 9 August 2026, at the Korea International Exhibition Center, Ilsanseo District, Goyang. It was hosted by Riize's Sungchan, NCT Wish's Sion and Hearts2Hearts's Ian.

Performers:

- AllDay Project
- Alpha Drive One
- And2ble
- Ateez
- AxMxP
- Baby Dont Cry
- Babymonster
- Bibi
- BOL4
- Choi Ye-na
- Evan
- Hearts2Hearts
- Idid
- Izna
- KickFlip
- Kiss of Life
- Meovv
- NCT Wish
- Nexz
- Pi Cheol-in
- Red Velvet
- Riize
- Stray Kids
- Taeyong (NCT)
- Ten (NCT)
- Wonpil (Day6)
- Xikers
- Zerobaseone
List of musical performances

Artist	Song
Alpha Drive One	"Red Flavor" (Red Velvet cover)
And2ble	"Hot Summer" (F(x) cover)
KickFlip	"Dance the Night Away" (Twice cover)
Baby Dont Cry	"Bittersweet"
Idid	"Fly!" (Jam version)
AxMxP	"10 Reasons"
Hearts2Hearts	"Lemon Tang" "15-Love"
Izna	"Metronome"
Meovv	"Hit 'Em"
Xikers	"Okay"
KickFlip	"Eye-Poppin'" (Dance Break version)
Kiss of Life	"Sweat"
AllDay Project	"One More Time"
Nexz	"Mmchk"
Mingi (Ateez)	"Dinero"
And2ble	"Curious"
Alpha Drive One	"Freak Alarm"
Bibi	"Bumpa"
BOL4	"Please Summer!" (with. Jukjae, Yihyun (Baby Dont Cry))
Choi Ye-na	"Catch Catch"
Julie (Kiss of Life); Natty (Kiss of Life); Koko (Izna); Choi Jung-eun (Izna)	"Level Up" (Ciara cover)
Evan	"Ride or Die"
Ten (NCT)	"Enough For Me" (TEN:CORE0110 version)
Pi Cheol-in	"Party Rock Rock" "Love Sick" "Sincerely"
Anna (Meovv); Ella (Meovv); Bang Jee-min (Izna); Stella (Hearts2Hearts); Ian (Hearts2Hearts)	"As If It's Your Last" (Blackpink cover)
Babymonster	"Choom" "Sugar Honey Ice Tea" "Moon"
NCT Wish	"Ode to Love" "Boy Meets Girl" (Korean version) "Sticky"
Zerobaseone	"Blue" "Kill the Romeo" "Top 5" "Customize"
Riize	"Like a Bomb" "Do Your Dance" "D-D-Done"
Wonpil (Day6)	"Highs and Lows" "A Journey"
Taeyong (NCT)	"Storm" "WYLD" "Hot"
Red Velvet	"Surfin' Boy"
Ateez	"Bad" "Bouncy (K-Hot Chilli Peppers)" "Adrenaline" "The Real" (Heung version)
Stray Kids	"Ceremony" "This & That" "Chk Chk Boom" "Miroh"

==== Winter: SBS Gayo Daejeon 30th Anniversary ====
To celebrate SBS Gayo Daejeon's 30th anniversary, the 2026 Gayo Daejeon Winter would be held on 24–25 December 2026, at the Korea International Exhibition Center, Ilsanseo District, Goyang. The first day will be hosted by Ive's An Yu-jin, TXT's Yeonjun and Riize's Sungchan, while the second day will be hosted by Blackpink's Jisoo, BoyNextDoor's Woonhak and TWS' Shinyu.

Performers:

Day 1 (24 December 2026)

- &Team
- Baby Dont Cry
- BoA
- Enhypen
- Hearts2Hearts
- I-dle (Miyeon, Minnie)
- Idid
- Ive
- Izna
- KickFlip
- Nayeon (Twice)
- NCT 127
- NCT Wish
- Nexz
- Nmixx
- Rescene
- Riize
- Tomorrow X Together
- Xikers
- XngHan & Xoul
- Yeonjun (Tomorrow X Together)
- U-Know Yunho (TVXQ)

Day 2 (25 December 2026)

- A2O Lite
- A2O Soul
- AllDay Project
- Alpha Drive One
- And2ble
- Ateez
- Babymonster
- BoyNextDoor
- CL
- Cortis
- Evan
- Itzy
- Jisoo (Blackpink)
- KiiiKiii
- Meovv
- Shinee
- Soyeon (I-dle)
- Stray Kids
- T-ara
- Treasure
- Tuide
- TWS
- Zerobaseone

== Award winners ==
=== Grand Prize (Daesang) ===
Year	Winner
1997	H.O.T
1998	H.O.T
1999	Fin.K.L
2000	Jo Sung-mo
2001	G.o.d
2002	BoA
2003	Lee Hyori
2004	Shinhwa
2005	Kim Jong-kook
2006	TVXQ

=== Main Prize (Bonsang) ===
Year	Winners
1996	Kim Gun-mo; Kim Jong-min; Park Mee-kyung; Kim Won-jun; Shin Seung-hun; DJ DOC; Clon; Turbo; Panic; Re.f
1997	H.O.T; Turbo; J.Y Park; Lim Chang Jung; Kim Kyung Ho; Sechs Kies; UP; Uhm Jung-hwa; COOL; Jinusean
1998	H.O.T; Uhm Jung-hwa; Fin.K.L; Turbo; Kim Hyun-jung; Lim Chang Jung; DIVA; COOL; S.E.S; Sechs Kies
1999	Baby Vox; Uhm Jung-hwa; Kim Hyun-jung; Yoo Seung-jun; Lim Chang Jung; Sechs Kies; Jo Sung-mo; Fin.K.L; Park Ji-yoon; Country Kko Kko
2000	Jo Sung-mo; Country Kko Kko; Fin.K.L; G.o.d; Kangta; Im Chang-jung; Kim Hyun-jung; Lee Jung-hyun; Park Ji-yoon; Uhm Jung-hwa; Yoo Seung-jun
2002	BoA; Baby Vox; Cool; Im Chang-jung; Jang Na-ra; Kangta; Kim Hyun-jung; Koyote; Lee Jung-hyun; Lee Soo-young; Park Hyo-shin; Shin Seung-hun; Shinhwa; Sung Si-kyung; Wax
2003	Lee Hyori; Baby Vox; BoA; Fly to the Sky; Jewelry; Jo Sung-mo; Koyote; Lee Soo-young; NRG; Rain; S; Shinhwa; Sung Si-kyung; Wheesung; YB
2004	Shinhwa; BoA; Jaurim; Kim Jong-kook; Koyote; Lee Seung-chul; Lee Soo-young; MC the Max; Park Hyo-shin; Park Sang-min; Rain; TVXQ
2005	Kim Jong-kook; BoA; Buzz; G.o.d; Jewelry; Lee Min-woo; MC Mong; MC the Max; SG Wannabe; Shin Hye-sung; Tei; TVXQ; Wheesung
2006	TVXQ; Baek Ji-young; Buzz; Eru; Fly to the Sky; Lee Seung-gi; MC Mong; Psy; Rain; Seven; SG Wannabe; Shinhwa; Sung Si-kyung; Vibe

=== Rookie Award ===
Year	Winners
1996	H.O.T; Young Turks Club
1997	Lee Ji-hoon; Steven Yoo; Yangpa; Julliette
1998	Baby Vox; NRG; Park Ji-yoon; Taesaja
1999	Lee Jung-hyun; Koyote; S#ARP
2000	Chakra; Fly To The Sky
2001	Jang Na-ra; Sung Si-kyung
2002	Byul; Rain; Swi.T
2003	Lexy; Big Mama; Seven
2004	Lee Seung-gi; SG Wannabe
2005	Ivy; SS501
2006	SeeYa; Super Junior

=== Rock Award ===
Year	Winners
1999	Y2K
2000	SKY
2001	Not awarded
2002	Cherry Filter; Moon Hee-joon
2003	Cherry Filter; Maya
2004	Buzz
2005	Maya
2006	Loveholic

=== Hip Hop Award ===
Year	Winners
1999	1TYM
2000	1TYM
2001	Jinusean
2002	Psy; YG Family
2003	Eun Ji-won
2004	Cho PD
2005	Epik High
2006	Dynamic Duo

=== Dance Award ===
Year	Winners
1999	Baek Ji-young
2000	Sharp
2001	Hong Kyung-min; Koyote
2002	Chakra
2003	Chakra
2004	Sugar
2005	Chae Yeon
2006	Chae Yeon

=== Trot Award ===
Year	Winners
1999	Tae Jin-ah
2000	Tae Jin-ah
2001	Tae Jin-ah
2002	Tae Jin-ah; Song Dae-kwan; Hyeon Suk
2003	Song Dae-kwan; Seol Un-do; Jo Hang-jo; Hyeon Suk; Choe Yu-na; Choi Jin-hee
2004	Song Dae-kwan; Seol Un-do; Hyeon Suk; Kim Hye-yeon; Jang Yoon-jeong
2005	Song Dae-kwan; Jang Yoon-jeong
2006	Song Dae-kwan; Tae Jin-ah; Jang Yoon-jeong

=== Ballad Award ===
Year	Winners
2001	Kim Min-jong
2002	Lee Ki-chan; UN
2003	Wax
2004	Lyn

=== R&B Award ===
Year	Winners
2000	J
2001	Lee Ki-chan
2002	Wheesung; Yoon Mi-rae; Fly to the Sky
2003	Not awarded
2004	Fly to the Sky

=== Professional Awards ===
Year	Best Composer	Best Lyricist	Best Producer	Best Music Video Director
1997	Lee Kyung-seob	Yang Hyun-suk	Lee Soo-man	Not awarded
1998	Kim Hyung-seuk	Lee Seung-ho	Lee Soo-man	Kim Se-hun
1999	Lee Kyung-seob	J.Y Park	Choi Jun-young	Kim Kwang-soo
2000	Lee Kyung-seob	J.Y Park	J.Y Park	Hong Joong-ho
2001	Choi Jun-young	Han Kyung-hye	J.Y Park	Cha Eun-taek
2002	Park Geun-tae	Shim Hyun-bo	J.Y Park	Cha Eun-taek
2003	Park Geun-tae	Park Kyung-jin	Yang Hyun-suk	Seo Hyun-seong
2004	PSY; Park Geun-tae	Cho Eun-hee	Lee Soo-man	Jang Jae-hyeok
2005	Jin Hye-sung	Cho Eun-hee	Ryu Jae-hyun	Choi Dong-hoon
2006	Cho Young-soo	Ahn Young-min	Kim Kwang-soo	Not awarded

=== SBS Producer's Award ===
Year	Winners
2000	Baby Vox
2001	Kim Gun-mo
2002	Rich, Jewelry
2003	UN
2004	Lee Soo-young
2005	SG Wannabe
2006	SG Wannabe

=== Popularity awards ===
Year	Winners	Winners
1998	Popularity Award	Country Kko Kko
1999	Popularity Award	G.O.D
2000	Popularity Award	Hong Kyung-min; Shinhwa
2001	Most Popular Award	Fin.K.L; Kangta
2001	Popularity Award	Click-B; UN
2001	Netizen Popularity Award	Yoo Seung-jun
2002	Popularity Award	J-Walk, Kang Sung-hoon
2002	Netizen Popularity Award	Jang Na-ra; Shinhwa
2003	Netizen Popularity Award	Rain; Shinhwa
2004	Most Popular Award	Rain; BoA
2005	Most Popular Award	TVXQ
2006	Netizen Popularity Award	SS501

=== Other awards ===
Year	Winners	Winners
1996	Special Achievement Award	Insooni
1997	Live Performance Award	Lee Moon-sae
1997	Special Achievement Award	Tae Jin-ah
1998	Special Achievement Award	Kim Kyung-ho
2000	Special Achievement Award	Clon
2001	Fashion Leader Award	Chakra
2002	Soundtrack Award	Can
2002	Special Award	Sugar
2003	Trot of the Year	Song Dae-kwan
2005	Live Performance Award	Lee Moon-sae
2005	Special Achievement Award	Cho Yong-pil
2006	Indie Band Award	Sogyumo Acacia Band
2006	Live Performance Award	Shin Seung-hun
2015	Best leader Award	Onew

== Gallery ==
2021 SBS Gayo Daejeon

== See also ==
- KBS Song Festival
- MBC Gayo Daejejeon
