= Fe3O4: Forward =

- Digital cover

EP by Nmixx
- Released: March 17, 2025
- Length: 16:59
- Language: Korean
- Labels: JYP; Republic

Nmixx chronology
Fe3O4: Stick Out (2024)	Fe3O4: Forward (2025)	Blue Valentine (2025)

Singles from Fe3O4: Forward
- 1. "High Horse" Released: March 4, 2025; 2. "Know About Me" Released: March 17, 2025

Professional ratings
Review scores
Source	Rating
IZM	3.5/5 stars

Fe3O4: Forward is the fourth extended play by South Korean girl group Nmixx. It was released by JYP Entertainment and Republic Records on March 17, 2025, and contains six tracks, including the pre-release single "High Horse" and the lead single "Know About Me".

== Background and release ==
On February 19, 2025, Nmixx announced that their fourth extended play Fe3O4: Forward would be released on March 17, serving as the finale to the Fe3O4 series following their previous two extended plays, Fe3O4: Break and Fe3O4: Stick Out. The promotional schedule was released the following day. Concept photos and visual films were released from February 24 to 27. On March 2, upon the reveal of the track listing, the lead single was announced to be "Know About Me".

Two story films were released on March 3 and 4, with the latter being a performance visualizer for "High Horse", which was later released as a pre-release single on the same day. On March 8, the animation story film titled The Confession of Midas Girl was released. On March 10, the group released a commentary video titled The Journey of Fe3O4, explaining the various meanings behind the Fe3O4 series. The acapella and original highlight medleys of the album tracks were released on March 12 and 13 respectively. The music video teasers for the lead single were released on March 15 and 16. With the album's release on March 17, the music video for the lead single was released.

== Track listing ==
Track listing for Fe3O4: Forward
No.	Title	Lyrics	Music	Arrangement	Length
1.	"High Horse"	Kim Su-ji (Lalala Studio); pH-1; Abir	Lee Woo-min "Collapsedone"; Abir; Julius Rodriguez; Fredrik "Fredro" Odesjo	Collapsedone; Fredro	3:23
2.	"Know About Me"	Oh Hyun-sun (Lalala Studio); Jang Da-in (Artiffect); Chaeryn (153/Joombas); Chloe; Kim Hye-i (153/Joombas); Cho Yu-ri; Bang Hye-hyun; Sung Yu-jin (Jam Factory)	Chloe; Dyan; Kristin Marie Skolem; Lise Reppe; Jack Brady; Jordan Roman	The Wavys; Chloe; Dyan	2:45
3.	"Slingshot (<★)"	Rizin (153/Joombas); Danke (Lalala Studio); Oh Hyun-sun (Lalala Studio); Cian (Artiffect)	Strong Dragon (The Hub); Jolly; Frankie Day (The Hub); Aston	Strong Dragon (The Hub); Jolly	2:22
4.	"Golden Recipe"	Kim Seung-hyun (Artiffect); Mudd the Student; Park Seong-hee (Jam Factory); Kim Min-jeong (Lalala Studio); Choi Seo-yul (Artiffect); Danne Kim (Artiffect); Katty (153/Joombas)	Ryan S. Jhun; Dwayne Abernathy Jr.; Candice Pillay; Ido Nadjar	Ryan S. Jhun; Dem Jointz; Ido Nadjar	3:01
5.	"Papillon"	Hyeong-geun (PNP); Danke (Lalala Studio); Nogeum (Artiffect); J14 (Full8loom); Ellie Suh (153/Joombas); Ahn Ji-soo (Onclassa); Jeong Oh (Jam Factory); Jin-kyeong (Artiffect); 329 (PNP); C'SA	C'SA; Ends	Ends	2:38
6.	"Ocean"	Lee Eun-hwa (153/Joombas); Park Se-rin (Lalala Studio); Jonjon (XYXX); Lee Ja-yeon (Jam Factory); Jung Eung-gi (Lalala Studio); Cho Yu-ri	Tommy Park; Chris Wahle; Emily Middlemas; Hautboi Rich	Tommy Park; Chris Wahle	2:50
Total length:					16:59

== Charts ==
=== Weekly charts ===
Weekly chart performance for Fe3O4: Forward
Chart (2025)	Peak position
Greek Albums (IFPI)	21
Japanese Albums (Oricon)	15
Japanese Combined Albums (Oricon)	23
Japanese Download Albums (Billboard Japan)	17
South Korean Albums (Circle)	1
US Top Album Sales (Billboard)	16
US World Albums (Billboard)	6

=== Monthly charts ===
Monthly chart performance for Fe3O4: Forward
Chart (2025)	Position
Japanese Albums (Oricon)	44
South Korean Albums (Circle)	4

=== Year-end charts ===
Year-end chart performance for Fe3O4: Forward
Chart (2025)	Position
South Korean Albums (Circle)	34

== Certifications ==
Certifications for Fe3O4: Forward
Region	Certification	Certified units/sales
South Korea (KMCA)	2× Platinum	500,000^{^}
^{^} Shipments figures based on certification alone.

== Listicles ==
Listicles for Fe3O4: Forward
Publication	List	Rank	Ref.
Idology	Top 20 Albums of 2025	Placed	
Screen Rant	The 10 Best K-Pop Albums Released In 2025 So Far	7	

== Release history ==
Release history for Fe3O4: Forward
Region	Date	Format	Label
South Korea	March 17, 2025	CD	JYP; Republic
Various	March 17, 2025	Digital download; streaming	JYP; Republic
