= Party O'Clock =

Party O'Clock may refer to:

- "Party O'Clock" (Kat DeLuna song), a single by American singer Kat DeLuna from her album Inside Out
- "Party O'Clock" (Nmixx song), a song by Nmixx, released as the lead single from their single album A Midsummer Nmixx's Dream
