= Fe3O4: Stick Out =

- Digital cover

EP by Nmixx
- Released: August 19, 2024
- Length: 17:35
- Language: Korean
- Labels: JYP; Republic

Nmixx chronology
Fe3O4: Break (2024)	Fe3O4: Stick Out (2024)	Fe3O4: Forward (2025)

Singles from Fe3O4: Stick Out
- 1. "See That?" Released: August 19, 2024

Fe3O4: Stick Out is the third extended play by South Korean girl group Nmixx. It was released by JYP Entertainment and Republic Records on August 19, 2024, and contains six tracks, including the lead single "See That?".

== Background ==
In July 2024, Nmixx began promoting their third EP, 7 months following the release of their second, Fe3O4: Break in January. A pre-release song titled "Sickuhh" featuring Kid Milli and produced by Dem Jointz was released on August 12. The full tracklist for the album was released on August 13.

== Promotion ==
Nmixx hosted a pop up store at The Hyundai in Seoul on August 24 to commemorate the album's release.

== Track listing ==
Track listing for Fe3O4: Stick Out
No.	Title	Lyrics	Music	Arrangement	Length
1.	"See That?" (별별별)	Mudd the Student; Omega Sapien; Wutan; Jasmine	Strong Dragon (The Hub); Puff; C'SA; 1Take (Newtype); Add Blessed (Newtype); Chase (Newtype); Co8; Newtype	Strong Dragon (The Hub); Puff	3:02
2.	"Sickuhh" (featuring Kid Milli)	Choi Won-jae	Ryan S. Jhun; Dwayne Abernathy Jr.; 8AE; Gizzle; Jack Brady; Jordan Roman; Bailey Flores; Stan Greene	Ryan S. Jhun; Dem Jointz; The Wavys	2:39
3.	"Red Light Sign, But We Go"	Lee Green (Lalala Studio); Since; Lee Eun-hwa (153/Joombas); Jang Da-in (Artiffect)	Ryan S. Jhun; Timothy Randolph Edgar; Sorana Pacurar; Roland Spreckley	Ryan S. Jhun; Tim Randolph	2:17
4.	"Beat Beat"	Jang Da-in (Artiffect); Lee Seu-ran; Kim Hui-yeon (Jam Factory); Sa Bo-dae (Lalala Studio)	Garden; Hot Sauce; Gusten Dahlqvist; Arineh Karimi; Louise Frick Sveen	Garden; Hot Sauce	2:48
5.	"Moving On"	Kim Su-ji (Lalala Studio); Ji-in (PNP); Lee Ji-yeon (Jam Factory)	Lee Woo-min "Collapsedone"; Ma-chi (MRCH)	Collapsedone	3:30
6.	"Love Is Lonely"	Choi Bo-ra (153/Joombas); Jang Seung-min (Lalala Studio); Lee Yi-jin; Moon Ji-young (Lalala Studio)	Ryan S. Jhun; Mathias Wang; Nick Hahn; Fanny Hultman	Ryan S. Jhun; Junkmail; Nick Hahn	3:17
Total length:					17:35

Notes

- "See That?" and "Red Light Sign, But We Go" are stylized in sentence case
- "Sickuhh" and "Beat Beat" are stylized in all uppercase

== Charts ==
=== Weekly charts ===
Weekly chart performance for Fe3O4: Stick Out
Chart (2024–2025)	Peak position
Croatian International Albums (HDU)	25
Greek Albums (IFPI)	49
Japanese Albums (Oricon)	25
Japanese Combined Albums (Oricon)	27
Japanese Hot Albums (Billboard Japan)	30
South Korean Albums (Circle)	1
US Heatseekers Albums (Billboard)	12
US Top Albums Sales (Billboard)	15
US World Albums (Billboard)	5

=== Monthly charts ===
Monthly chart performance for Fe3O4: Stick Out
Chart (2024)	Position
South Korean Albums (Circle)	3

=== Year-end charts ===
Year-end chart performance for Fe3O4: Break Out
Chart (2024)	Position
South Korean Albums (Circle)	41

== Certifications ==
Certifications for "Fe3O4: Stick Out"
Region	Certification	Certified units/sales
South Korea (KMCA)	2× Platinum	500,000^{^}
^{^} Shipments figures based on certification alone.

== Release history ==
Release history for Fe3O4: Stick Out
Region	Date	Format	Label
South Korea	August 19, 2024	CD	JYP; Republic
Various	August 19, 2024	Digital download; streaming	JYP; Republic
