= High Horse =

"High Horse" may refer to:

- "High Horse" (Nitty Gritty Dirt Band song), a 1985 song by Nitty Gritty Dirt Band
- "High Horse" (Indigo Girls song), a 1987 song by Indigo Girls
- "High Horse" (Kacey Musgraves song), a 2018 song by Kacey Musgraves
- "High Horse" (Nmixx song), a 2025 song by Nmixx
