= Roller Coaster (Nmixx song) =

Single by Nmixx

from the album A Midsummer Nmixx's Dream
- Language: Korean
- Released: July 3, 2023
- Genre: House
- Length: 2:59
- Label: JYP; Republic
- Composers: Justin Reinstein; Suhyppy; Anna Timgren
- Lyricist: Seo Ji-eum

Nmixx singles chronology
| "Love Me Like This" (2023) | "Roller Coaster" (2023) | "Party O'Clock" (2023) |

Music video
- Roller Coaster on YouTube

"Roller Coaster" is a song recorded by South Korean girl group Nmixx. It was released as a pre-release single for their third single album A Midsummer Nmixx's Dream by JYP Entertainment and Republic Records on July 3, 2023.

== Background and release ==
On June 20, 2023, JYP Entertainment announced Nmixx would be releasing their third single album, titled A Midsummer Nmixx's Dream, on July 11. Two days later, the promotional schedule was released. It was announced that a single from the album would be pre-released. On June 26, the track listing was released with "Roller Coaster" announced as the pre-release single. On June 30, the highlight medley teaser video was released. On July 2, the music video teaser was released. The song was released alongside its music video on July 3.

== Composition ==
"Roller Coaster" was written by Seo Ji-eum, composed and arranged by Justin Reinstein, with Suhyppy, and Anna Timgren participating in the composition. It was described as "urban" house song with "dreamy pre-chorus". "Roller Coaster" was composed in the key of G major, with a tempo of 120 beats per minute.

== Critical reception ==
Professional ratings
Review scores
| Source | Rating |
|---|---|
| IZM | 1.5/5 stars |

So Seung-geun wrote for IZM that although the song "escapes the facade of "Mixx-pop", it still contains a weak melody".

Year-end lists for "Roller Coaster"
| Critic/Publication | List | Rank | Ref. |
|---|---|---|---|
| Dazed | Top 50 best K-pop tracks of 2023 | 6 | |

== Credits and personnel ==
Credits adapted from Melon.

Studio

- JYPE Studio – recording, mixing
- Glab Studio – mixing for Dolby Atmos
- 821 Sound Mastering – mastering
- Ingrid Studio – vocal editing

Personnel

- Nmixx – vocals
- Suhyppy – background vocals, composition, vocal directing
- Seo Ji-eum – lyrics
- Justin Reinstein – composition, arrangement, instruments
- Anna Timgren – composition
- Seo Eun-il – recording
- Lee Tae-seop – mixing
- Shin Bong-won – mixing
- Park Nam-joo – mixing (assistant)
- Kwon Nam-woo – mastering
- Emily Yeonseo Kim – vocal directing
- Song Hee-jin (Solcire) – vocal directing
- Mr Cho (Solcire) – vocal directing
- Jung Eun-kyung – vocal editing

== Charts ==
=== Weekly charts ===
Weekly chart performance for "Roller Coaster"
| Chart (2023) | Peak position |
|---|---|
| South Korea (Circle) | 100 |

=== Monthly charts ===
Monthly chart performance for "Roller Coaster"
| Chart (2023) | Position |
|---|---|
| South Korea (Circle) | 112 |

== Release history ==
Release history for "Roller Coaster"
| Region | Date | Format | Label |
|---|---|---|---|
| Various | July 3, 2023 | Digital download; streaming | JYP; Republic |
