= See That? =

Single by Nmixx

from the EP Fe3O4: Stick Out
- Language: Korean
- Released: August 19, 2024
- Genre: Hip-hop; country
- Length: 3:02
- Label: JYP; Republic
- Composers: Strong Dragon (The Hub); Puff; C'SA; 1Take (Newtype); Add Blessed (Newtype); Chase (Newtype); Co8; Newtype
- Lyricists: Mudd the Student; Omega Sapien; Wutan; Jasmine

Nmixx singles chronology
"Dash" (2024)	"See That?" (2024)	"High Horse" (2025)

Music video
- "See That?" on YouTube

Professional ratings
Review scores
Source	Rating
IZM	1.5/5 stars

"See That?" (Korean: 별별별; RR: Byeolbyeolbyeol; lit. 'All sorts of things') is a song by South Korean girl group Nmixx for their third extended play, Fe3O4: Stick Out. It was released as the EP's lead single by JYP Entertainment and Republic Records on August 19, 2024.

== Background and release ==
On July 22, 2024, JYP Entertainment announced Nmixx would be releasing their third extended play, Fe3O4: Stick Out, on August 19. On August 13, with the release of the track listing, "See That?" was announced as the album's lead single. The teaser for its music video was released on August 17. Two days later upon the album's release, the song was released along with its music video.

== Composition ==
"See That?" was written by Mudd the Student, Omega Sapien, Wutan, and Jasmine, and composed by Strong Dragon (The Hub), Puff, C'SA, 1Take (Newtype), Add Blessed (Newtype), Chase (Newtype), Co8, and Newtype. The song is described as being a "mix of old school hip-hop and country genres based on groovy rhythms".

== Commercial performance ==
In South Korea, "See That?" debuted at number 43 on the Circle Digital Chart in the chart issue dated August 18–24, 2024. Four weeks later, the song peaked at number 22.

== Credits and personnel ==
Credits adapted from Melon.

Studio

- JYPE Studio – recording
- Henson Studios - mixing
- Glab Studio – mixing for Dolby Atmos
- The Mastering Palace – mastering

Personnel

- Nmixx – vocals
- C'SA – background vocals, composition, vocal directing, vocal editing
- Mudd the Student – lyrics
- Omega Sapien – lyrics
- Wutan – lyrics
- Jasmine – lyrics
- Strong Dragon (The Hub) – composition, arrangement, various instruments, vocal directing
- Puff – composition, arrangement
- 1Take (Newtype) – composition
- Add Blessed (Newtype) – composition
- Chase (Newtype) – composition
- Co8 – composition
- Newtype – composition
- Cho Yong-ho – various instruments
- Seo Eun-il – recording
- Kwak Bo-eun – recording
- Josh Gudwin – mixing
- Shin Bong-won – mixing
- Felix Byrne – mixing (assistant)
- Park Nam-joon – mixing (assistant)
- Dave Kutch – mastering

== Charts ==
=== Weekly charts ===
Weekly chart performance for "See That?"
Chart (2024)	Peak position
South Korea (Circle)	22
South Korea (Billboard)	24

=== Monthly charts ===
Monthly chart performance for "See That?"
Chart (2024)	Position
South Korea (Circle)	23

=== Year-end charts ===
Year-end chart performance for "See That?"
Chart (2024)	Position
South Korea (Circle)	171

== Accolades ==
Music program awards for "See That?"
Program	Date	Ref.
M Countdown	August 29, 2024	
Music Bank	August 30, 2024	
Inkigayo	September 1, 2024	

== Release history ==
Release history for "See That?"
Region	Date	Format	Label
Various	August 19, 2024	Digital download; streaming	JYP; Republic
