= Kim Hyun-jung (singer) =

South Korean pop singer (born 1976)

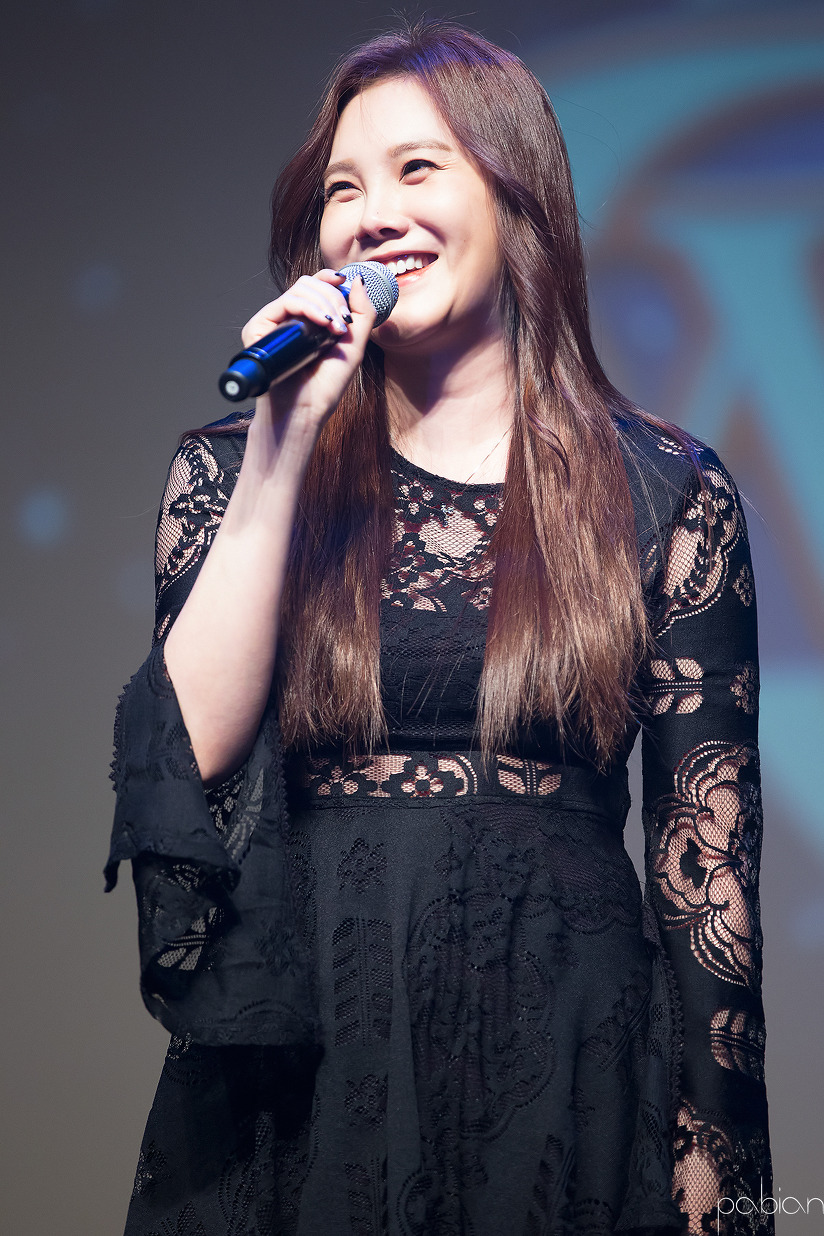
- Kim in 2015

Background information
- Born: April 4, 1976 (age 50); Seoul, South Korea
- Genres: K-pop, dance, R&B
- Occupation: Singer
- Years active: 1997–present
- Label: HIM Entertainment
- Website: kimhyunjung.co.kr

- Kim Hyun-jung
- Hangul: 김현정
- Hanja: 金炫廷
- RR: Gim Hyeonjeong
- MR: Kim Hyŏnjŏng

Kim Hyun-jung (Korean: 김현정, born April 4, 1976) is a South Korean pop singer. Well known as the "Long-legged singer", and with the experience of performing in a heavy metal band, Kim made her debut as a female solo singer with the dance-infused album Legend. The song "Breakup with Her" was a fast-tempo song with strong beats that shot Kim quickly to the top. The song "Lonely Love" was also a great hit. Since her debut, Kim Hyun-jung has succeeded in releasing great songs, usually dance numbers.

In 1997, Kim gained significant notoriety shortly after her debut.

== Discography ==
=== Studio albums ===
Title	Album details	Peak chart positions	Sales
Title	Album details	KOR RIAK	Sales
Legend	Released: February 13, 1997 (KOR); Rereleased: May 21, 1998 as Shocking; Label: Revolution No.9; Formats: CD, cassette	2 (Note: The oldest available chart data is from August 1998.)	KOR: 552,639
A Seagull of Dream	Released: February 22, 1999 (KOR); Label: Revolution No. 9; Formats: CD, cassette	1	KOR: 561,614
The 3rd Eye	Released: May 22, 2000 (KOR); Label: Revolution No. 9; Formats: CD, cassette	—	KOR: 421,052
Wild Beauty	Released: July 25, 2001 (KOR); Label: Revolution No. 9; Formats: CD, cassette	—	KOR: 240,000
Forever	Released: August 27, 2001 (TWN); Formats: CD	—	TWN: 200,000
Diet	Released: August 1, 2002 (KOR); Label: Pure Entertainment; Formats: CD, cassette	3	KOR: 179,809
Hit For 6ix	Released: July 11, 2003 (KOR); Label: Pure Entertainment; Formats: CD, cassette	7	KOR: 53,426
I Love Soul	Released: September 23, 2004 (KOR); Label: Him Entertainment; Formats: CD, cassette	9	KOR: 17,477
In N Out	Released: June 12, 2008 (KOR); Label: Him Entertainment; Formats: CD	18	KOR: 3,948

=== Special albums ===
Title	Album details	Peak chart positions	Sales
Title	Album details	KOR RIAK	Sales
Fun Town 20	Released: June 23, 2005 (KOR); Label: Him Entertainment; Formats: CD, cassette	13	KOR: 38,671
Dance With Hyun Jung	Released: May 17, 2006 (KOR); Label: Him Entertainment; Formats: CD, cassette	12	KOR: 11,232

=== Extended plays ===
Title	Album details	Peak chart positions	Sales
Title	Album details	KOR Gaon	Sales
Together Forever 18	Released: June 26, 2015 (KOR); Label: Him Entertainment; Formats: CD, digital download	—	

=== Singles ===
Title	Year	Peak chart positions	Sales	Album
Title	Year	KOR Gaon (Note: The Gaon Music Chart was established in 2010.)	Sales	Album
"Lonely Love" (혼자한 사랑)	1997	—		Legend
"Break Up With Her" (그녀와의 이별)	1997	13	KOR: 192,284	Legend
"Freedom Declaration" (자유선언)	1999	—		A Seagull Of Dream
"Separation Can Come Back" (되돌아온 이별)	1999	—		A Seagull Of Dream
"Bruise" (멍)	2000	18	KOR: 133,937	The Third Eye
"Like A Lie" (거짓말처럼)	2000	—		The Third Eye
"You Who Left" (떠난 너)	2001	—		Wild Beauty
"Single Stroke" (단칼)	2002	—		Diet
"If This Is The End" (끝이라면)	2003	—		Hit For 6ix
"Solar Energy" (태양 에너지)	2004	—		I Love Soul
"Type B Man" (B형 남자)	2004	—		I Love Soul
"Funky Town" (originally by Lipps Inc.)	2005	—		Fun Town 20
"Be Strong, Hyun Jung" (굳세어라 현정아)	2006	—		Dance With Hyun Jung
"Saljjak Kung" (살짝 쿵)	2008	—		In N Out
"Cry Cry" (울다 울다)	2008	—		In N Out
"Gold Miss Goes" (골드미스가 간다 송)	2009	—		Non-album singles
"1 Minute 1 Second" (1분 1초)	2011	18	KOR: 291,949	Non-album singles
"Harpoon" (작살) (feat. Alien)	2015	—		Non-album singles
"Empty Talk" (빈말)	2015	—		Together Forever 18
"Attention" (너만있으면돼)	2015	—		Together Forever 18
"Holeman Is Back" (톡까고 말할래) (with Holeman)	2020	—		Non-album single

== Awards and nominations ==
Award ceremony	Year	Category	Nominee / Work	Result	Ref.
Golden Disc Awards	1998	Album Bonsang	Shocking	Won	
Golden Disc Awards	1999	Album Bonsang	A Seagull Of Dream	Won	
Golden Disc Awards	2000	Album Bonsang	The 3rd Eye	Won	
KBS Song Festival	1998	Singer of the Year (Bonsang)	Kim Hyung-jung	Won	
KBS Song Festival	1999	Singer of the Year (Bonsang)	Kim Hyung-jung	Won	
KBS Song Festival	2000	Singer of the Year (Bonsang)	Kim Hyung-jung	Won	
KBS Song Festival	2001	Singer of the Year (Bonsang)	Kim Hyung-jung	Won	
KBS Song Festival	2002	Singer of the Year (Bonsang)	Kim Hyung-jung	Won	
KMTV Korean Music Awards	1998	Best New Artist	Kim Hyung-jung	Won	
KMTV Korean Music Awards	1998	Popular Singer Award (Bonsang)	Kim Hyung-jung	Won	
KMTV Korean Music Awards	1999	Popular Singer Award (Bonsang)	Kim Hyung-jung	Won	
KMTV Korean Music Awards	2000	Popular Singer Award (Bonsang)	Kim Hyung-jung	Won	
KMTV Korean Music Awards	2001	Popular Singer Award (Bonsang)	Kim Hyung-jung	Won	
KMTV Korean Music Awards	2002	Popular Singer Award (Bonsang)	Kim Hyung-jung	Won	
Korean Entertainment Art Awards	1999	Youth Singer Award	Kim Hyung-jung	Won	
Korean Entertainment Art Awards	2001	New Generation Singer Award	Kim Hyung-jung	Won	
KY Star Awards	2018	Favorite Karaoke Room Song	Kim Hyung-jung	Won	
MAMA Awards	2000	Best Female Artist	"Are You Really" (너 정말)	Nominated	
MAMA Awards	2001	Best Female Artist	"You Who Left" (떠난 너)	Won	
MAMA Awards	2001	Best Dance Performance	"You Who Left" (떠난 너)	Nominated	
MAMA Awards	2002	Best Female Artist	"Knife" (단칼)	Nominated	
MAMA Awards	2003	Best Dance Performance	"If This Is The End" (끝이라면)	Nominated	
MBC Gayo Daejejeon	1998	Popular Singer Award (Bonsang)	Kim Hyun-jung	Won	
MBC Gayo Daejejeon	1999	Producers' Award	Kim Hyun-jung	Won	
MBC Gayo Daejejeon	2000	Popular Singer Award (Bonsang)	Kim Hyun-jung	Won	
MBC Gayo Daejejeon	2001	Popular Singer Award (Bonsang)	Kim Hyun-jung	Won	
SBS Gayo Daejeon	1998	Main Prize (Bonsang)	Kim Hyun-jung	Won	
SBS Gayo Daejeon	1999	Main Prize (Bonsang)	Kim Hyun-jung	Won	
SBS Gayo Daejeon	2000	Main Prize (Bonsang)	Kim Hyun-jung	Won	
SBS Gayo Daejeon	2001	Main Prize (Bonsang)	Kim Hyun-jung	Won	
SBS Gayo Daejeon	2002	Main Prize (Bonsang)	Kim Hyun-jung	Won	
Seoul Music Awards	1998	Best New Artist	Kim Hyun-jung	Won	
Seoul Music Awards	2001	K-wave Special Award	Kim Hyun-jung	Won	
