= A Midsummer Nmixx's Dream =

- Digital cover

Single album by Nmixx
- Released: July 11, 2023
- Length: 12:04
- Language: Korean
- Labels: JYP; Republic

Nmixx chronology
Expérgo (2023)	A Midsummer Nmixx's Dream (2023)	Fe3O4: Break (2024)

Singles from A Midsummer Nmixx's Dream
- 1. "Roller Coaster" Released: July 3, 2023; 2. "Party O'Clock" Released: July 11, 2023

A Midsummer Nmixx's Dream is the third single album by South Korean girl group Nmixx. It was released by JYP Entertainment and Republic Records on July 11, 2023, and contains four tracks, including the pre-release single "Roller Coaster" and the lead single "Party O'Clock".

== Background and release ==
On June 20, 2023, JYP Entertainment announced Nmixx would be releasing their third single album, titled A Midsummer Nmixx's Dream, on July 11. Two days later, the promotional schedule was released. It was announced that a single from the album would be pre-released. On June 24, a teaser video titled "A Midsummer Night's Phantom" was released. On June 26, the track listing was released with "Roller Coaster" announced as the pre-release single, and "Party O'Clock" announced as the lead single. On June 30, the highlight medley teaser video was released. On July 2, the music video teaser for "Roller Coaster" was released. On July 3, "Roller Coaster" was released alongside its music video. On July 9, the music video teaser for "Party O'Clock" was released. The single album was released alongside the music video for "Party O'Clock" on July 11.

== Composition ==
A Midsummer Nmixx's Dream consists of four tracks. The first track and lead single "Party O'Clock" was described as "garage-based" pop song characterized by "bright and exciting melody" with lyrics about "solving the mysterious things that happen in the forest on a midsummer night". "Roller Coaster" described as an urban house song with "dreamy pre-chorus".

== Track listing ==
Track listing for A Midsummer Nmixx's Dream
No.	Title	Lyrics	Music	Arrangement	Length
1.	"Party O'Clock"	J.Y. Park "The Asiansoul"; Danke (Lalala Studio); Dr. Jo; Hwang Yu-bin (Verygoods); Wkly; Lee Seu-ran; Oh Hyun-sun (Lalala Studio)	Josefin Glenmark; Paulina "Pau" Cerrilla; Harry Sommerdahl; Fabian "Phat Fabe" Torsson; J.Y. Park "The Asiansoul"	Bangers & Ca$h	3:03
2.	"Roller Coaster"	Seo Ji-eum	Justin Reinstein; Suhyppy; Anna Timgren	Justin Reinstein	2:59
3.	"Party O'Clock" (Inst.)		Josefin Glenmark; Paulina "Pau" Cerrilla; Harry Sommerdahl; Fabian "Phat Fabe" Torsson; J.Y. Park "The Asiansoul"	Bangers & Ca$h	3:03
4.	"Roller Coaster" (Inst.)		Justin Reinstein; Suhyppy; Anna Timgren	Justin Reinstein	2:59
Total length:					12:04

== Credits and personnel ==
Credits adapted from album's liner notes.

Studio

- JYPE Studio – recording (all tracks), mixing (track 2, 4)
- Glab Studio – mixing for Dolby Atmos (all tracks)
- 821 Sound Mastering – mastering (all tracks)
- Ingrid Studio – vocal editing (track 2)

Personnel

- Nmixx – vocals (all tracks)
- Emily Yeonseo Kim – background vocals (track 1), vocal directing (track 2)
- Suhyppy – background vocals (track 2), composition (track 2, 4), vocal directing (track 2)
- J.Y. Park "The Asiansoul" – lyrics (track 1), composition (track 1, 3)
- Danke (Lalala Studio) – lyrics (track 1)
- Dr. Jo – lyrics (track 1)
- Hwang Yu-bin (Verygoods) – lyrics (track 1)
- Wkly – lyrics (track 1)
- Lee Seu-ran (JamFactory) – lyrics (track 1)
- Oh Hyun-sun (Lalala Studio) – lyrics (track 1)
- Seo Ji-eum – lyrics (track 2)
- Josefin Glenmark – composition (track 1, 3)
- Paulina "Pau" Cerrilla – composition (track 1, 3)
- Harry Sommerdahl (Bangers & Ca$h) – composition, arrangement, instruments (track 1, 3)
- Fabian "Phat Fabe" Torsson (Bangers & Ca$h) – composition, arrangement, instruments (track 1, 3)
- Justin Reinstein – composition, arrangement, instruments (track 2, 4)
- Anna Timgren – composition (track 2, 4)
- Goo Hye-jin – recording (track 1, 3)
- Seo Eun-il – recording (all tracks)
- Curtis Douglas – mixing (track 1)
- Lee Tae-seob – mixing (track 2, 4)
- Shin Bong-won – mixing (all tracks)
- Park Nam-joo – mixing (assistant) (all tracks)
- Kwon Nam-woo – mastering (all tracks)
- Sophia Pae – vocal directing (track 1)
- Song Hee-jin (Solcire) – vocal directing (track 1–2)
- Mr Cho (Solcire) – vocal directing (track 1–2)
- Jiyoung Shin NYC – vocal editing (track 1)
- Jung Eun-kyung – vocal editing (track 2)

== Charts ==
=== Weekly charts ===
Weekly chart performance for A Midsummer Nmixx's Dream
Chart (2023)	Peak position
South Korean Albums (Circle)	3

=== Monthly charts ===
Monthly chart performance for A Midsummer Nmixx's Dream
Chart (2023)	Position
South Korean Albums (Circle)	7

=== Year-end charts ===
Year-end chart performance for A Midsummer Nmixx's Dream
Chart (2023)	Position
South Korean Albums (Circle)	36

== Certifications ==
Certifications for A Midsummer Nmixx's Dream
Region	Certification	Certified units/sales
South Korea (KMCA)	3× Platinum	750,000^{^}
^{^} Shipments figures based on certification alone.

== Release history ==
Release history for A Midsummer Nmixx's Dream
Region	Date	Format	Label
Various	July 11, 2023	Digital download; streaming	JYP
South Korea	July 11, 2023	CD	JYP
United States	August 11, 2023	CD	JYP; Republic
