= Party O'Clock (Nmixx song) =

Single by Nmixx

from the album A Midsummer Nmixx's Dream
- Language: Korean
- Released: July 11, 2023
- Genre: Pop
- Length: 3:03
- Label: JYP; Republic
- Composers: Josefin Glenmark; Paulina "Pau" Cerrilla; Harry Sommerdahl; Fabian "Phat Fabe" Torsson; J.Y. Park "The AsianSoul"
- Lyricists: J.Y. Park "The AsianSoul"; Danke (Lalala Studio); Dr. Jo; Hwang Yu-bin (Verygoods); Wkly; Lee Seu-ran (JamFactory); Oh Hyun-seo (Lalala Studio)

Nmixx singles chronology
"Roller Coaster" (2023)	"Party O'Clock" (2023)	"Soñar (Breaker)" (2023)

Music video
- Party O'Clock on YouTube

"Party O'Clock" is a song recorded by South Korean girl group Nmixx for their third single album A Midsummer Nmixx's Dream. It was released as the album's lead single by JYP Entertainment and Republic Records on July 11, 2023.

== Background and release ==
On June 20, 2023, JYP Entertainment announced Nmixx would be releasing their third single album, titled A Midsummer Nmixx's Dream, on July 11. On June 26, the track listing was released with "Party O'Clock" announced as the lead single. On June 30, the highlight medley teaser video was released. On July 9, the music video teaser was released. The song was released alongside the album and its music video on July 11.

== Composition ==
"Party O'Clock" was written by J.Y. Park "The AsianSoul", Danke (Lalala Studio), Dr. Jo, Hwang Yu-bin (Verygoods), Wkly, Lee Seu-ran (JamFactory), and Oh Hyun-seo (Lalala Studio), composed by Josefin Glenmark, Paulina "Pau" Cerrilla, Harry Sommerdahl, Fabian "Phat Fabe" Torsson, and J.Y. Park "The AsianSoul", and arranged by Bangers & Cash. It was described as "garage-based" pop song characterized by "bright and exciting melody" with lyrics about "solving the mysterious things that happen in the forest on a midsummer night". "Party O'Clock" was composed in the key of A minor, with a tempo of 128 beats per minute.

== Promotion ==
Prior to the release of A Midsummer Nmixx's Dream, on July 11, 2023, Nmixx held a live event on YouTube to introduce the single album and its song, including "Party O'Clock", and to communicate with their fans. The group subsequently performed on four music programs: Mnet's M Countdown on July 13, KBS's Music Bank on July 14, MBC's Show! Music Core on July 15, and SBS's Inkigayo on July 16.

== Credits and personnel ==
Credits adapted from album's liner notes.

Studio

- JYPE Studio – recording
- Glab Studio – mixing for Dolby Atmos
- 821 Sound Mastering – mastering

Personnel

- Nmixx – vocals
- Emily Yeonseo Kim – background vocals
- J.Y. Park "The AsianSoul" – lyrics, composition
- Danke (Lalala Studio) – lyrics
- Dr. Jo – lyrics
- Hwang Yu-bin (Verygoods) – lyrics
- Wkly – lyrics
- Lee Seu-ran (JamFactory) – lyrics
- Oh Hyun-seo (Lalala Studio) – lyrics
- Josefin Glenmark – composition
- Paulina "Pau" Cerrilla – composition
- Harry Sommerdahl – composition
- Fabian "Phat Fabe" Torsson – composition
- Bangers & Cash – arrangement, instruments
- Goo Hye-jin – recording
- Seo Eun-il – recording
- Curtis Douglas – mixing
- Shin Bong-won – mixing
- Park Nam-joo – mixing (assistant)
- Kwon Nam-woo – mastering
- Sophia Pae – vocal directing
- Song Hee-jin (Solcire) – vocal directing
- Mr Cho (Solcire) – vocal directing
- Jiyoung Shin NYC – vocal editing

== Charts ==
=== Weekly charts ===
Weekly chart performance
Chart (2023)	Peak position
South Korea (Circle)	139

=== Monthly charts ===
Monthly chart performance
Chart (2023)	Position
South Korea (Circle)	181

== Release history ==
Release history
Region	Date	Format	Label
Various	July 11, 2023	Digital download; streaming	JYP; Republic
