= Know About Me =

Single by Nmixx

from the EP Fe3O4: Forward
- Language: Korean
- Released: March 17, 2025
- Genre: Hip-hop; trap; R&B; synth-pop; pop
- Length: 2:45
- Label: JYP; Republic
- Composers: Chloe; Dyan; Kristin Marie Skolem; Lise Reppe; Jack Brady; Jordan Roman
- Lyricists: Oh Hyun-sun (Lalala Studio); Jang Da-in (Artiffect); Cailin (153/Joombas); Chloe; Hei Kim (153/Joombas); Cho Yu-ri; Bang Hye-hyun; Sung Yu-jin (Jamfactory)

Nmixx singles chronology
"High Horse" (2025)	"Know About Me" (2025)	"Blue Valentine" (2025)

Music video
- "Know About Me" on YouTube

"Know About Me" (stylized in all caps) is a song recorded by South Korean girl group Nmixx for their fourth extended play Fe3O4: Forward. It was released as the EP's lead single by JYP Entertainment and Republic Records on March 17, 2025.

== Background and release ==
On February 19, 2025, it was announced that Nmixx would be releasing their fourth extended play titled Fe3O4: Forward on March 17. On March 2, "Know About Me" was announced as the EP's lead single, with the release of the track listing. Two teasers for its music video were released on March 15 and 16 respectively. The music video was released on March 17 upon the EP's release.

== Composition ==
"Know About Me" was written by Oh Hyun-sun (Lalala Studio), Jang Da-in (Artiffect), Cailin (153/Joombas), Chloe, Hei Kim (153/Joombas), Cho Yu-ri, Bang Hye-hyun, and Sung Yu-jin (Jamfactory), and composed by Chloe, Dyan, Kristin Marie Skolem, Lise Reppe, Jack Brady, and Jordan Roman. The song is described as having "chill yet modern hip-hop beats, trap-based drums and bold synth sound". In an interview with Nicole Fell from The Hollywood Reporter, member Lily said that the song's genre is "a mix of trap beats, R&B and pop".

== Promotion ==
Nmixx performed "Know About Me" on three music programs in the first week of promotion: Mnet's M Countdown on March 20, KBS's Music Bank on March 21, and SBS's Inkigayo on March 23.

== Credits and personnel ==
Credits adapted from Melon.

Studio

- JYPE Studios – vocal editing, recording
- Henson Studios – mixing
- Glab Studios – mixing for Dolby Atmos
- 821 Sound Mastering – mastering

Personnel

- Nmixx – vocals
- Lily – background vocals
- Haewon – background vocals
- Kyujin – background vocals
- Oh Hyun-sun (Lalala Studio) – lyrics
- Jang Da-in (Artiffect) – lyrics
- Cailin (153/Joombas) – lyrics
- Chloe – lyrics, composition, arrangement, vocal directing
- Hei Kim (153/Joombas) – lyrics
- Cho Yu-ri – lyrics
- Bang Hye-hyun – lyrics
- Sung Yu-jin (Jamfactory) – lyrics
- Dyan – composition, arrangement, vocal directing
- Kristin Marie Skolem – composition
- Lise Reppe – composition
- Jack Brady – composition
- Jordan Roman – composition
- The Wavys – arrangement
- C'SA – vocal directing, vocal editing
- Goo Hye-jin – vocal editing
- Kwak Bo-eun – recording
- Uhm Se-hee – recording
- Josh Gudwin – mixing
- Shin Bong-won – mixing
- Felix Byrne – mixing (assistant)
- Park Nam-joon – mixing (assistant)
- Kwon Nam-woo – mastering

== Charts ==
=== Weekly charts ===
Weekly chart performance
Chart (2025)	Peak position
South Korea (Circle)	78
Taiwan (Billboard)	14

=== Monthly charts ===
Monthly chart performance
Chart (2025)	Position
South Korea (Circle)	150

== Accolades ==
Music program awards
Program	Date	Ref.
Show Champion	March 26, 2025	
Music Bank	March 28, 2025	
Inkigayo	March 30, 2025	

== Release history ==
Release history
Region	Date	Format	Label
Various	March 17, 2025	Digital download; streaming	JYP; Republic
