= Baby Dont Cry =

South Korean girl group

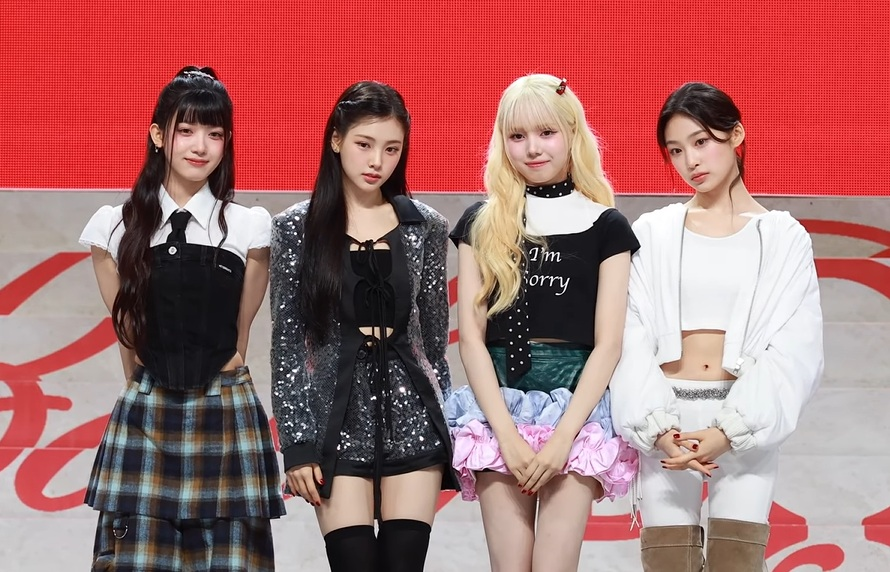
- Baby Dont Cry in June 2025; L–R: Kumi, Yihyun, Mia, and Beni

Background information
- Also known as: P Girls
- Origin: South Korea
- Genres: K-pop; dance-pop
- Years active: 2025–present
- Label: P Nation
- Members: Yihyun; Kumi; Mia; Beni
- Website: pnation.com/artists/17

Baby Dont Cry (Korean: 베이비돈크라이; stylized as Baby DONT Cry) is South Korean girl group formed and managed by P Nation. The group consists of four members: Yihyun, Kumi, Mia, and Beni. They debuted on June 23, 2025, with the single album F Girl.

== History ==
=== Pre-debut ===
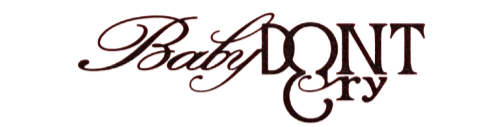
Official logo

On February 6, 2025, South Korean pop music news outlet SWAY reported that P Nation was preparing to launch its first girl group in 2025, with I-dle member Soyeon taking charge of the group's creative direction and music production. On April 11, it was announced that the quartet would use the name "P Girls".

=== 2025–present: Introduction and debut ===
On June 9, P Nation opened a Baby Dont Cry SNS account and announced that they would officially debut on June 23. On June 16, Baby Dont Cry announced that they would debut on June 23. On the same day, the music video for "Bet You'll Regret It" was released ahead of schedule. On June 23, Baby Dont Cry released their debut single album F Girl, with the lead single of the same name. The music video for the title track was released only four days after its release, and the number of views exceeded 20 million. As of June 30, the number of views had exceeded 26 million. The song "F Girl", expresses an attitude of challenging the rigid standards of judging people based on achievements and numbers. On November 5, Baby Dont Cry announced that they would be making their music comeback on November 19, with their first digital single "I Dont Care".

On March 3, 2026, it was announced that Baby Dont Cry would be releasing their first extended play After Cry on March 24. The pre-release single "Shapeshifter" was released on March 11. On October 26, P Nation announced that the group would be releasing the single "Replay" on November 4. The Japanese version of the song would simultaneously be released as a pre-release for their Japanese debut extended play Daybreak/Replay, set to be released on January 20, 2027.

== Members ==
- Yihyun (이현)
- Kumi (쿠미)
- Mia (미아)
- Beni (베니)

== Discography ==
=== Extended plays ===
List of extended plays, showing selected details, peak chart positions and sales
Title	Details	Peak chart positions	Sales
Title	Details	KOR	Sales
After Cry	Released: March 24, 2026; Label: P Nation; Formats: CD, digital download, streaming; Track listing: 1. "Mama I'm Alright"; 2. "Bittersweet"; 3. "Shapeshifter"; 4. "Moves like Ciara"; 5. "Tears on My Pillow"	12	KOR: 18,492

=== Single albums ===
List of single albums, showing selected details
Title	Details
F Girl	Released: June 23, 2025; Label: P Nation; Formats: CD, digital download, streaming; Track listing: 1. "F Girl"; 2. "Bet You'll Regret It" (지금을 놓치면 분명 너 후회할 거야)

=== Singles ===
List of singles, showing year released, selected chart positions, and name of the album
Title	Year	Peak chart positions	Album
Title	Year	KOR DL	Album
"F Girl"	2025	45	F Girl
"I Dont Care"	2025	41	Non-album single
"Shapeshifter"	2026	37	After Cry
"Bittersweet"	2026	24	After Cry
"Replay"	2026	37	Non-album single

== Videography ==
=== Music videos ===
Title	Year	Director(s)	Ref.
"Bet You'll Regret It" (지금을 놓치면 분명 너 후회할 거야)	2025	Unknown	
"F Girl"	2025	Suho Lee (Boring Studio)	
"I Dont Care"	2025	Lumpens (Bower)	
"Shapeshifter"	2026	Unknown	
"Bittersweet"	2026	Yunah Sheep	
"Replay"	2026	Unknown	

== Accolades ==
=== Awards and nominations ===
Name of the award ceremony, year presented, category, nominee(s) of the award, and the result of the nomination
Award	Year	Category	Nominee(s)	Result	Ref.
MAMA Awards	2025	Artist of the Year	Baby Dont Cry	Longlisted	
MAMA Awards	2025	Best New Artist	Baby Dont Cry	Nominated	
MAMA Awards	2025	Fans' Choice Top 10 – Female	Baby Dont Cry	Longlisted	

=== Listicles ===
Name of publisher, year listed, name of listicle, and placement
Publisher	Year	Listicle	Placement	Ref.
NME	2026	The NME 100	Placed	
