= Sung-jae =

- Hangul: 성재
- RR: Seongjae
- MR: Sŏngjae

Sung-jae, also spelled Seong-jae, is a Korean given name.

People with this name include:

- Lee Sung-jae (born 1970), South Korean actor
- Kim Sung-jae (1972–1995), South Korean hip-hop artist
- Lee Sung-jae (footballer born 1976), South Korean football player
- Kim Seong-jae (born 1976), South Korean retired football player
- Bae Sung-jae (born 1978), South Korean sports commentator
- Lee Sung-jae (footballer born 1987), South Korean football player
- Yook Sungjae (born 1995), South Korean idol singer, member of BtoB

== See also ==
- List of Korean given names
