= Soñar (Breaker) =

Single by Nmixx

from the EP Fe3O4: Break
- Language: Korean; English; Spanish
- Released: December 4, 2023
- Genre: Hip hop; UK garage
- Length: 2:53
- Label: JYP; Republic
- Composers: Brian U (The Hub); Honey Noise (The Hub); Aftrshok (The Hub); Joseph K (The Hub); Brown Panda (The Hub); LSY; NVR Know; Frankie Day (The Hub); Awrii (The Hub); Ayushy (The Hub); Jacob Aaron (The Hub)
- Lyricists: Bok Joo-young (Lalala Studio); Oh Hyun-sun (Lalala Studio)

Nmixx singles chronology
"Party O'Clock" (2023)	"Soñar (Breaker)" (2023)	"Dash" (2024)

Music video
- "Soñar (Breaker)" on YouTube

"Soñar (Breaker)" is a song by South Korean girl group Nmixx for their second extended play Fe3O4: Break. It was released as the EP's pre-release single by JYP Entertainment and Republic Records on December 4, 2023.

== Background and release ==
On November 28, 2023, JYP Entertainment announced Nmixx would be releasing their second EP titled Fe3O4: Break and its pre-release track "Soñar (Breaker)" on January 15, 2024, and December 4, 2023, respectively. A teaser for the music video of the song was released on December 2. The song and its music video were released 2 days later on December 4. A Spanish version of the song was issued on October 11, 2024.

== Composition ==
"Soñar (Breaker)" was written by Bok Jooyoung (Lalala Studio), and Oh Hyunsun (Lalala Studio), and composed by Brian U (The Hub), Honey Noise (The Hub), Aftrshok (The Hub), Joseph K (The Hub), Brown Panda (The Hub), LSY, NVR Know, Frankie Day (The Hub), Awrii (The Hub), Ayushy (The Hub), and Jacob Aaron (The Hub). The song has been described as having "a mix of the Latin-styled hip-hop genre and the UK garage genre". The Spanish version is described as having "Spanish guitar melodies in the mixx-pop section".

== Critical reception ==
Professional ratings
Review scores
Source	Rating
IZM	3/5 stars

Lee Hong-hyun wrote for IZM that the song is a "well orchestrated single that is a culmination of the group's previous experimentations".

== Commercial performance ==
"Soñar (Breaker)" debuted at number 142 on the Circle Digital Chart in the chart issue dated December 3–9, 2023.

== Charts ==
=== Weekly charts ===
Weekly chart performance
Chart (2023–2024)	Peak position
South Korea (Circle)	111

=== Monthly charts ===
Monthly chart performance
Chart (2024)	Position
South Korea (Circle)	124

== Release history ==
Release history
Region	Date	Format	Version	Label
Various	December 4, 2023	Digital download; streaming	Original	JYP; Republic
Various	October 11, 2024	Digital download; streaming	Spanish	JYP; Republic
