= High Horse (Nmixx song) =

- Digital cover

Single by Nmixx

from the EP Fe3O4: Forward
- Language: Korean; English
- Released: March 4, 2025
- Genre: Hip-hop; jazz; pop
- Length: 3:23
- Label: JYP; Republic
- Composers: Lee Woo-min "Collapsedone"; Abir; Julius Rodriguez; Fredrik "Fredro" Odesjo
- Lyricists: Kim Su-ji (Lalala Studio); pH-1; Abir

Nmixx singles chronology
"See That?" (2024)	"High Horse" (2025)	"Know About Me" (2025)

Professional ratings
Review scores
Source	Rating
IZM	3.5/5 stars

"High Horse" is a song recorded by South Korean girl group Nmixx for their fourth extended play Fe3O4: Forward. It was released as the EP's pre-release single by JYP Entertainment and Republic Records on March 4, 2025.

== Background and release ==
On February 19, 2025, it was announced that Nmixx would be releasing their fourth extended play titled Fe3O4: Forward on March 17. With the release of the track listing on March 2, "High Horse" was revealed to be one of the tracks. On March 4, after the performance visualizer for the song was released, it was released as a pre-release single.

== Composition ==
"High Horse" was written by Kim Su-ji (Lalala Studio), pH-1, and Abir, and composed by Lee Woo-min "Collapsedone", Abir, Julius Rodriguez, and Fredrik "Fredro" Odesjo. The song is described as being "a mix of genres such as hip-hop, jazz, pop, and various elements", featuring "a unique rhythm that intersects piano and breakbeat based on lyrical ballads".

== Promotion ==
Nmixx performed "High Horse", alongside the EP's lead single "Know About Me", on three music programs in the first week of promotion: Mnet's M Countdown on March 20, KBS's Music Bank on March 21, and SBS's Inkigayo on March 23.

== Credits and personnel ==
Credits adapted from Melon.

Studio

- JYPE Studios – recording
- Glab Studios – engineering for mix, mixing, mixing for Dolby Atmos
- 821 Sound Mastering – mastering

Personnel

- Nmixx – vocals
- Haewon – background vocals
- Kim Su-ji (Lalala Studio) – lyrics
- pH-1 – lyrics
- Abir – lyrics, composition
- Lee Woo-min "Collapsedone" – composition, arrangement, computer programming, various instruments, vocal directing, vocal editing
- Julius Rodriguez – composition, piano
- Fredrik "Fredro" Odesjo – composition, arrangement, computer programming
- C'SA – vocal directing
- Goo Hye-jin – recording
- Im Chan-mi – recording
- Kwak Bo-eun – recording
- Park Nam-joon – engineering for mix, mixing (assistant)
- Shin Bong-won – mixing
- Kwon Nam-woo – mastering

== Listicles ==
"High Horse" on listicles
Critic/Publication	List	Rank	Ref.
Billboard	The 25 Best K-Pop Songs of 2025 (So Far): Critic's Picks	2	
Billboard	The 100 Best Songs of 2025: Staff Picks	62	
NME	The 25 best K-pop songs of 2025	7	

== Charts ==
=== Weekly charts ===
Weekly chart performance for "High Horse"
Chart (2025)	Peak positions
South Korea Download (Circle)	23

=== Monthly charts ===
Monthly chart performance for "High Horse"
Chart (2025)	Peak positions
South Korea Download (Circle)	51

== Release history ==
Release history for "High Horse"
Region	Date	Format	Label
Various	March 4, 2025	Digital download; streaming	JYP; Republic
