= Fe3O4: Break =

- Digital cover

EP by Nmixx
- Released: January 15, 2024
- Genre: K-pop
- Length: 20:59
- Language: Korean
- Labels: JYP; Republic

Nmixx chronology
A Midsummer Nmixx's Dream (2023)	Fe3O4: Break (2024)	Fe3O4: Stick Out (2024)

Singles from Fe3O4: Break
- 1. "Soñar (Breaker)" Released: December 4, 2023; 2. "Dash" Released: January 15, 2024

Fe3O4: Break is the second extended play by South Korean girl group Nmixx. It was released by JYP Entertainment and Republic Records on January 15, 2024, and contains seven tracks, including the pre-release single "Soñar (Breaker)" and the lead single "Dash".

== Background and release ==
On November 28, 2023, JYP Entertainment announced Nmixx would be releasing their second EP titled A Fe3O4: Break and its pre-release track "Soñar (Breaker)" on January 15, 2024, and December 4, 2023, respectively. On January 2, 2024, a short animated film titled Fe3O4: Declaration teasing the release of the EP was released, which is followed by a trailer film titled Sense Break Aware and its accompanying promotional pictures two days later. The track listing was released on January 6, with "Dash" announced as the lead track. On January 9, a performance video for the track "Run for Roses" was released. Two highlight medley videos, an acapella version and a normal version, were released on January 11 and 12 respectively.

== Reception ==
Professional ratings
Review scores
Source	Rating
IZM	3/5 stars
AllMusic	3.5/5 stars

=== Year-end lists ===
Year-end lists for Fe3O4: Break
Publication	List	Rank	Ref.
Billboard	The 25 Best K-Pop Albums of 2024: Staff Picks	10th	
Idology	16 Best Albums of 2024	Placed	

== Track listing ==
Track listing for Fe3O4: Break
No.	Title	Lyrics	Music	Arrangement	Length
1.	"Dash"	Deza; Won Ji-ae (Jam Factory); Jeong Da-yeon (Onclassa); Baek Sae-im (PNP); Oh Hyun-sun (Lalala Studio); Rick Bridges; Kim In (153/Joombas); Hyeong-geun (Inhouse); Wkly; Sung Yu-jin (Jam Factory)	Puff; Strong Dragon (The Hub); C'SA	Puff; Strong Dragon (The Hub)	2:46
2.	"Soñar (Breaker)"	Bok Joo-young (Lalala Studio); Oh Hyun-sun (Lalala Studio)	Brian U (The Hub); Honey Noise (The Hub); Aftrshok (The Hub); Joseph K (The Hub); Brown Panda (The Hub); LSY; NVR Know; Frankie Day (The Hub); Awrii (The Hub); Ayushy (The Hub); Jacob Aaron (The Hub)	Brian U (The Hub); Honey Noise (The Hub); Aftrshok (The Hub); Joseph K (The Hub); Brown Panda (The Hub); LSY; NVR Know	2:53
3.	"Run for Roses"	Young K; Lee Seu-ran; Frankie Day (The Hub)	Greg Bonnick; Hayden Chapman; Taet Chesterton; Danny Shah	LDN Noise	3:35
4.	"Boom"	Oh Hyun-sun (Lalala Studio); Jang Da-in (Artiffect); Lee Seu-ran; Yoo Ga-young (Artiffect)	Ryan S. Jhun; Jack Brady; Jordan Roman; Austin Wolfe	Ryan S. Jhun; The Wavys	2:55
5.	"Passionfruit"	Danke (Lalala Studio); Park Soo-bin (Jam Factory); Jin-sol	David Wilson; Colin Magalong; Sorana	Dwilly	2:40
6.	"XOXO"	Hwang Yu-bin (XYXX); Hyeong-geun (Inhouse)	Jayna Brown; Ori Rose; Novodor; Tmm	Novodor	2:42
7.	"Break the Wall"	Park Ji-hyun (Artiffect); Oh Hyun-sun (Lalala Studio)	Ayushy (The Hub); Awrii (The Hub); Frankie Day (The Hub); Brian U (The Hub); Honey Noise (The Hub)	Brian U (The Hub); Honey Noise (The Hub)	3:24
Total length:					20:59

== Charts ==
=== Weekly charts ===
Weekly chart performance for Fe3O4: Break
Chart (2024)	Peak position
Croatian International Albums (HDU)	1
French Albums (SNEP)	185
Japanese Albums (Oricon)	17
Japanese Combined Albums (Oricon)	16
Japanese Hot Albums (Billboard Japan)	30
South Korean Albums (Circle)	1
US Billboard 200	171
US Heatseekers Albums (Billboard)	1
US World Albums (Billboard)	2

=== Monthly charts ===
Monthly chart performance for Fe3O4: Break
Chart (2024)	Position
Japanese Albums (Oricon)	44
South Korean Albums (Circle)	2

=== Year-end charts ===
Year-end chart performance for Fe3O4: Break
Chart (2024)	Position
South Korean Albums (Circle)	31

== Certifications ==
Certifications for Fe3O4: Break
Region	Certification	Certified units/sales
South Korea (KMCA)	3× Platinum	750,000^{^}
^{^} Shipments figures based on certification alone.

== Release history ==
Release history for Fe3O4: Break
Region	Date	Format	Label
Various	January 15, 2024	Digital download; streaming	JYP; Republic
South Korea	January 15, 2024	CD	JYP; Republic
United States	January 19, 2024	CD	JYP; Republic
