= Dash (Nmixx song) =

Single by Nmixx

from the EP Fe3O4: Break
- Language: Korean
- Released: January 15, 2024
- Genre: Old school hip-hop; pop-punk
- Length: 2:46
- Label: JYP; Republic
- Composers: Puff; Strong Dragon (The Hub); C'SA
- Lyricists: Deza; Won Ji-ae (Jamfactory); Jeong Da-yeon (Onclassa); Baek Sae-in (Pnp); Oh Hyun-seon (Lalala Studio); Rick Bridges; Kim In (153/Joombas); Hyeong Geun (Inhouse); Wkly; Seong Yu-jin (Jamfactory)

Nmixx singles chronology
"Soñar (Breaker)" (2023)	"Dash" (2024)	"See That?" (2024)

Music video
- "Dash" on YouTube

"Dash" (stylized in all caps) is a song by South Korean girl group Nmixx for their second extended play, Fe3O4: Break. It was released as the EP's lead single by JYP Entertainment and Republic Records on January 15, 2024.

== Background and release ==
On November 28, 2023, JYP Entertainment announced Nmixx would be releasing their second EP, Fe3O4: Break, on January 15, 2024. On January 6, 2024, "Dash" was announced as the lead track of the album with the release of the track listing, followed by the release of a teaser for its music video on January 13. The song along with its music video and the album was released two days later on January 15.

== Composition ==
"Dash" was written by Deza, Won Ji-ae (Jamfactory), Jeong Da-yeon (Onclassa), Baek Sae-in (Pnp), Oh Hyun-seon (Lalala Studio), Rick Bridges, Kim In (153/Joombas), Hyeong Geun (Inhouse), Wkly, and Seong Yu-jin (Jamfactory), and composed by Puff, Strong Dragon (The Hub), and C'SA. The song is described as being a "cross between old school hip-hop and pop punk".

== Commercial performance ==
In South Korea, "Dash" debuted at number 78 on the Circle Digital Chart in the chart issue dated January 14–20, 2024. Three weeks later, the song peaked at number 77.

== Promotion ==
On the second week of release, Nmixx performed "Dash" on four music programs: MBC M's Show Champion on January 24, Mnet's M Countdown on January 25, KBS' Music Bank on January 26, and SBS' Inkigayo on January 28, all of which where they won first place and making it their first music show wins since "Love Me Like This".

== Charts ==
=== Weekly charts ===
Weekly chart performance for "Dash"
Chart (2024)	Peak position
Global Excl. US (Billboard)	181
South Korea (Circle)	75

=== Monthly charts ===
Monthly chart performance for "Dash"
Chart (2024)	Position
South Korea (Circle)	81

=== Year-end charts ===
Year-end chart performance for "Dash"
Chart (2024)	Position
South Korea (Circle)	155

== Accolades ==
Music program awards for "Dash"
Program	Date	Ref.
Show Champion	January 24, 2024	
M Countdown	January 25, 2024	
Music Bank	January 26, 2024	
Inkigayo	January 28, 2024	

=== Listicles ===
Name of publisher, year listed, name of listicle, and placement
Publisher	Year	Listicle	Placement	Ref.
Idology	2024	16 Best Songs of 2024	Placed	
IZM	2024	2024 Domestic Single of the Year	Placed	
NME	2024	The 15 best K-pop songs of 2024 – so far	Placed	
NME	2024	NME's 25 Best K-pop Songs of 2024	21st	

== Release history ==
Release history for "Dash"
Region	Date	Format	Label
Various	January 15, 2024	Digital download; streaming	JYP; Republic
