= Mudd the Student =

South Korean rapper and singer (born 2000)

- Born: Yoon Seung-min; January 23, 2000 (age 26); Anyang, Gyeonggi, South Korea
- Genres: Rock; electronica; hip hop
- Occupations: Rapper; singer; songwriter
- Years active: 2019-present

Mudd the student (born 윤승민 Yoon Seung-min, January 23, 2000) is a South Korean singer-songwriter and rapper. He is known for his experimental sound, combining rock with electronica, hip hop, and pop elements.

== Early life ==
Yoon Seung-min was born in Anyang, Gyeonggi Province, and raised in Gijang, Busan.

In 2019, he applied to the Vans “Musician Wanted” contest and was selected as a top 5 finalist, which prompted him to seriously pursue a music career.

He adopted the stage name "Mudd the student" because he likes how "Mudd" sounds and "Student" reflects his motto that everything has something to learn from.

== Career ==
2019: Released his debut mixtape Mudd
2021: Released the EP Field Trip
2021: Appeared on Show Me the Money 10
~Present
Activities with Balming Tiger
Following his appearance on the show, Mudd the student began working as part of the Balming Tiger team, participating in various projects and further strengthening his experimental sound. His music naturally aligned with Balming Tiger's characteristic alternative and non-conventional musical universe, influencing his artistic identity.

== Artistry ==
Mudd the student is known for using mechanical noises, distortion, and eccentric samples—abstract and multilayered sound textures that define his music. He cites classic indie-rock bands such as Pavement, Dinosaur Jr., and Sonic Youth as major influences. These inspirations have shaped his unique sonic texture, his use of distorted vocals, and his dreamy, deliberately imperfect sound aesthetics.

== Discography ==
=== ALBUM ===
LAGEON (2025)

=== EP ===
Mudd (2019)

Field Trip (2021)

=== Mixtape ===
Equator (2019)

New Providence Cusk Eel (2019)

=== Single ===
Mudd the student - Off Road Jam (2021)

Mudd the student - 사랑은 유사과학 (Feat. 장기하) (2022)

=== Remix, Collaboration ===
Mudd the student - Reborn (2022)

GOLDBUUDA - Power Rangers (Feat. Mudd the student, Tyroné Laurent) (2022)

Panchiko - Failed at Math(s) (Mudd the student Remix) (2024)

Fax Gang & Parannoul - Wrong Signal (Feat. Mudd the student) (2024)

== Awards and nominations ==
| Award | Year | Nominee | Category | Result | Ref. |
|---|---|---|---|---|---|
| Korean Hip-hop Awards | 2022 | Himself | New Artist of the Year | Nominated | |
