= Twice albums discography =

- Twice in 2026
- Studio albums: 11
- Reissue studio albums: 1
- EPs: 14
- Reissue EPs: 3
- Compilation albums: 6
- Compilation EPs: 1
- Live albums: 1
- Remix albums: 1

The albums discography of South Korean girl group Twice consists of eleven studio albums, fourteen extended plays, one reissue studio album, three reissue EPs, six compilation albums, one compilation EP, one live album and one remix album. The group is composed of nine members: Nayeon, Jeongyeon, Momo, Sana, Jihyo, Mina, Dahyun, Chaeyoung and Tzuyu; and was formed by JYP Entertainment in July 2015, through the survival television show Sixteen.

Twice debuted in South Korea on October 20, 2015, with the release of their debut EP, The Story Begins. In 2016, the group's second and third EPs, Page Two and Twicecoaster: Lane 1 respectively, were released. The latter became one of the best-selling albums by a girl group in the history of the Gaon Album Chart, with over 475,000 copies sold. Its reissue, Twicecoaster: Lane 2, was released in February 2017, and the group's fourth EP, Signal, was released in May of that year. In October, their debut studio album, Twicetagram, and its lead single debuted at number one on the Billboard World Albums chart and World Digital Song Sales charts respectively, making them the first female Korean act to top both charts simultaneously. The three releases became the top three best-selling albums by a girl group in 2017. Twicetagram was subsequently reissued as Merry & Happy in December.

The group released their fifth EP, What Is Love?, in April 2018, which was reissued as Summer Nights in July of the same year. Yes or Yes, their sixth EP, was released in November, with a reissue titled The Year of "Yes" following it in December. The group maintained their best-selling girl group of the year status. Selling over 250,000 copies, What Is Love?, Summer Nights, Yes or Yes, and The Year of "Yes" each earned a platinum certification from the Korea Music Content Association (KMCA). The group's seventh and eighth EPs, Fancy You and Feel Special, were released in April and September 2019 respectively, and both later received a double platinum certification from the KMCA. In 2020, the group released their ninth EP, More & More, and second Korean studio album, Eyes Wide Open, of which both charted on the United States' Billboard 200.

In June 2021, Twice released their tenth EP, Taste of Love, which peaked at number one on the Billboard Top Album Sales chart and became the first EP by a girl group to do so. It was also the first EP by a girl group to enter the top 10 of the Billboard 200. In November, they released their third Korean studio album, Formula of Love: O+T=<3, which earned them their first triple platinum certification from the KMCA. In 2022, after the group's contract renewal with JYP Entertainment, their eleventh EP, Between 1&2, became their first EP to sell over a million copies. The group's twelfth EP, Ready to Be, was released in 2023, becoming their best-selling EP in South Korea. In 2024, the group's thirteenth and fourteenth EPs, With You-th and Strategy, were released. The former was the group's first number-one entry on the Billboard 200. In 2025, the group's fourth and fifth Korean studio albums, This Is For and Ten: The Story Goes On were released in July and October respectively.

Twice's debut in Japan occurred in 2017 with their first compilation album, #Twice, which earned the group their first platinum certification from the Recording Industry Association of Japan (RIAJ). The group's first Japanese studio album, BDZ, was released in September 2018 and was later platinum-certified. The repackaged edition of the album was released in the following December. The group released their second compilation album, #Twice2, in March 2019 and became platinum-certified by the RIAJ. In November of the same year, they released their second Japanese album, &Twice. In 2020, a repackage of &Twice and the group's third compilation album, #Twice3, were released. Twice's third Japanese studio album, Perfect World, was released in 2021. The compilation album #Twice4 and the studio album Celebrate were released in March and July 2022 respectively. In 2024, the group released their fifth Japanese studio album, Dive. In 2025, the compilation album #Twice5 and the studio album Enemy were released. The compilation album #Best 2015–2025 was released in 2026.

To date, Twice have earned thirteen number-one albums in South Korea, eight number-one albums on Japan's Oricon Albums Chart, seven number-one albums on the Billboard Japan Hot Albums, a number-one album in the United States, and six number-one albums on Billboard's World Albums. The group has sold over 7.2 million albums, as of 2021.

== Studio albums ==
=== Korean studio albums ===
Korean studio albums are marketed by JYP Entertainment as a "Full Album", except for Ten: The Story Goes On which was labeled as a "Special Album".

List of Korean studio albums showing selected details, selected chart positions, sales figures and music recording certifications
| Title | Details | Peak chart positions | | | | | | | | | | Sales | Certifications |
| Title | Details | KOR | BEL (FL) | CAN | GER | JPN | JPN Hot | NZ | UK Down. | US | US World | Sales | Certifications |
|---|---|---|---|---|---|---|---|---|---|---|---|---|---|
| Twicetagram | Released: October 30, 2017; Label: JYP Entertainment; Formats: CD, digital download, streaming | 1 | — | — | — | 7 | 12 | — | — | — | 1 | KOR: 458,522; JPN: 136,306 (Note: Japan combined physical and digital sales figures of Twicetagram and Merry & Happy, as of May 2020.); US: 1,000 | |
| Eyes Wide Open | Released: October 26, 2020; Label: JYP Entertainment, Republic; Formats: CD, digital download, streaming | 2 | 176 | — | — | 3 | 9 | — | 37 | 72 | 2 | KOR: 661,927; JPN: 59,988 | KMCA: 2× Platinum |
| Formula of Love: O+T=<3 | Released: November 12, 2021; Label: JYP Entertainment, Republic; Formats: CD, digital download, streaming | 1 | 64 | 17 | — | 2 | 17 | — | 39 | 3 | 1 | KOR: 1,024,740; JPN: 68,975; US: 133,000 | KMCA: 3× Platinum |
| This Is For | Released: July 11, 2025; Label: JYP Entertainment, Republic; Formats: CD, digital download, LP, streaming | 1 | 51 | 58 | 27 | 4 | 3 | 36 | 26 | 6 | — | KOR: 836,492; JPN: 41,136; US: 68,000 | KMCA: 3× Platinum |
| Ten: The Story Goes On | Released: October 10, 2025; Label: JYP Entertainment, Republic; Formats: CD, digital download, LP, streaming | 2 | — | — | — | 5 | 7 | — | 76 | 11 | — | KOR: 400,798; JPN: 20,504; US: 23,000 | KMCA: Platinum |
"—" denotes a recording that did not chart or was not released in that territory.

=== Japanese studio albums ===
List of Japanese studio albums showing selected details, selected chart positions, sales figures and music recording certifications
| Title | Details | Peak chart positions | | | | Sales | Certifications |
| Title | Details | JPN | JPN Hot | UK Down. | US World | Sales | Certifications |
|---|---|---|---|---|---|---|---|
| BDZ | Released: September 12, 2018 (Note: The repackaged edition of the album was released on December 26, 2018.); Label: Warner Music Japan; Formats: CD, digital download, DVD, LP, streaming | 1 | 1 | — | — | JPN: 360,055 | RIAJ: Platinum |
| &Twice | Released: November 20, 2019 (Note: The repackaged edition of the album was released on February 5, 2020.); Label: Warner Music Japan; Formats: CD, digital download, DVD, LP, streaming | 1 | 1 | — | — | JPN: 223,954 | RIAJ: Platinum |
| Perfect World | Released: July 28, 2021; Label: Warner Music Japan; Formats: CD, digital download, DVD, LP, streaming | 2 | 1 | — | — | JPN: 82,757 | RIAJ: Gold |
| Celebrate | Released: July 27, 2022; Label: Warner Music Japan; Formats: CD, digital download, DVD, LP, streaming | 2 | 2 | — | — | JPN: 127,393 | RIAJ: Gold |
| Dive | Released: July 17, 2024; Label: Warner Music Japan; Formats: CD, digital download, DVD, streaming | 2 | 2 | 87 | — | JPN: 135,635 | RIAJ: Gold |
| Enemy | Released: August 27, 2025; Label: Warner Music Japan; Formats: CD, digital download, DVD, streaming | 2 | 1 | — | 23 | JPN: 159,179 | RIAJ: Platinum |
"—" denotes a recording that did not chart or was not released in that territory.

=== Reissue studio albums ===
List of reissue studio albums showing selected details, selected chart positions and sales figures
| Title | Details | Peak chart positions | | | Sales |
| Title | Details | KOR | JPN | JPN Hot | Sales |
|---|---|---|---|---|---|
| Merry & Happy (Note: The reissue edition of the studio album Twicetagram.) | Released: December 11, 2017; Label: JYP Entertainment; Formats: CD, digital download, streaming | 1 | 8 (Note: The Japan sales for Twicetagram and Merry & Happy are combined in Japan. Following the release of Merry and Happy, Twicetagram re-entered the Oricon Albums Chart at number 8.) | 38 | KOR: 314,562; JPN: 136,306 |

== Extended plays ==
Marketed by JYP Entertainment as a "Mini Album".

List of extended plays showing selected details, selected chart positions, sales figures and music recording certifications
| Title | Details | Peak chart positions | | | | | | | | | | Sales | Certifications |
| Title | Details | KOR | CAN | GER | JPN | JPN Hot | FRA | SPA | UK Down. | US | US World | Sales | Certifications |
|---|---|---|---|---|---|---|---|---|---|---|---|---|---|
| The Story Begins | Released: October 20, 2015; Label: JYP Entertainment; Formats: CD, digital download, streaming | 3 | — | — | 43 | — | — | — | — | — | 15 | KOR: 272,522; JPN: 47,448; US: 4,000 | |
| Page Two | Released: April 25, 2016; Label: JYP Entertainment; Formats: CD, digital download, streaming | 2 | — | — | 16 | — | — | — | — | — | 6 | KOR: 382,229; JPN: 58,220 | |
| Twicecoaster: Lane 1 | Released: October 24, 2016; Re-edition: December 19, 2016; Label: JYP Entertainment; Formats: CD, digital download, streaming | 1 | — | — | 10 | 74 | — | — | — | — | 3 | KOR: 543,520; JPN: 139,067 (Note: Combined Japan sales figures of Twicecoaster: Lane 1 and Twicecoaster: Lane 2, as of May 2020.); US: 1,000 | |
| Signal | Released: May 15, 2017; Label: JYP Entertainment; Formats: CD, digital download, streaming | 1 | — | — | 11 | — | — | — | — | — | 3 | KOR: 455,889; JPN: 65,331; US: 1,000 | |
| What Is Love? | Released: April 9, 2018; Label: JYP Entertainment; Formats: CD, digital download, streaming | 2 | — | — | 2 | 10 | — | — | — | — | 3 | KOR: 523,271; JPN: 117,021 | KMCA: 2× Platinum |
| Yes or Yes | Released: November 5, 2018; Label: JYP Entertainment; Formats: CD, digital download, streaming | 1 | — | — | 1 | 7 | — | — | — | — | 7 | KOR: 481,282; JPN: 191,710 (Note: Combined Japan physical and digital sales figures of Yes or Yes and The Year of "Yes", as of May 2020.) | KMCA: 2× Platinum |
| Fancy You | Released: April 22, 2019; Label: JYP Entertainment; Formats: CD, digital download, streaming | 2 | — | — | 1 | 11 | — | 88 | 46 | — | 4 | KOR: 545,355; JPN: 132,779; US: 1,000 | KMCA: 2× Platinum |
| Feel Special | Released: September 23, 2019; Label: JYP Entertainment; Formats: CD, digital download, streaming | 1 | — | — | 3 | 13 | — | 47 | 42 | — | 6 | KOR: 595,519; JPN: 106,354; US: 1,000 | KMCA: 2× Platinum |
| More & More | Released: June 1, 2020; Label: JYP Entertainment, Republic; Formats: CD, digital download, streaming | 1 | — | — | 1 | 3 | — | — | 25 | 200 | 2 | KOR: 687,977; JPN: 124,187 | KMCA: 2× Platinum |
| Taste of Love | Released: June 11, 2021; Label: JYP Entertainment, Republic; Formats: CD, digital download, streaming | 2 | 38 | — | 2 | 15 | — | — | 23 | 6 | 1 | KOR: 722,921; JPN: 61,760; US: 54,000 | KMCA: 2× Platinum |
| Between 1&2 | Released: August 26, 2022; Label: JYP Entertainment, Republic; Formats: CD, digital download, streaming | 2 | 40 | — | 2 | 10 | — | — | 23 | 3 | 1 | KOR: 1,185,787; JPN: 54,244; US: 199,000 | KMCA: Million |
| Ready to Be | Released: March 10, 2023; Label: JYP Entertainment, Republic; Formats: CD, digital download, LP, streaming | 1 | 11 | 8 | 3 | 15 | 15 | — | 17 | 2 | 1 | KOR: 1,677,189; JPN: 59,128; US: 303,000 | KMCA: Million |
| With You-th | Released: February 23, 2024; Label: JYP Entertainment, Republic; Formats: CD, digital download, LP, streaming | 2 | — | 11 | 4 | 11 | 15 | — | 17 | 1 | 1 | WW: 1,200,000; KOR: 1,247,722; JPN: 65,931; US: 174,000 | KMCA: Million |
| Strategy | Released: December 6, 2024; Label: JYP Entertainment, Republic; Formats: CD, digital download, LP, streaming | 1 | — | 56 | 2 | 11 | — | — | 6 | 4 | — | KOR: 980,402; JPN: 57,716; US: 81,000 | KMCA: 3× Platinum |
"—" denotes a recording that did not chart or was not released in that territory.

=== Reissue extended plays ===
Marketed by JYP Entertainment as a "Special Album".

List of reissue extended plays showing selected details, selected chart positions, sales figures and music recording certifications
| Title | Details | Peak chart positions | | | | Sales | Certifications |
| Title | Details | KOR | JPN | JPN Hot | US World | Sales | Certifications |
|---|---|---|---|---|---|---|---|
| Twicecoaster: Lane 2 (Note: The reissue edition of the extended play Twicecoaster: Lane 1.) | Released: February 20, 2017; Label: JYP Entertainment; Formats: CD, digital download, streaming | 1 | 13 (Note: The sales for Twicecoaster: Lane 1 and Twicecoaster: Lane 2 are combined in Japan. Following the release of Twicecoaster: Lane 2, Twicecoaster: Lane 1 re-entered the Oricon Albums Chart at number 13.) | — | 4 | KOR: 412,813; JPN: 139,067 | |
| Summer Nights (Note: The reissue edition of the extended play What Is Love?.) | Released: July 9, 2018; Label: JYP Entertainment; Formats: CD, digital download, streaming | 1 | 4 | 14 | 4 | KOR: 506,515; JPN: 106,673 | KMCA: 2× Platinum |
| The Year of "Yes" (Note: The reissue edition of the extended play Yes or Yes.) | Released: December 12, 2018; Label: JYP Entertainment; Formats: CD, digital download, streaming | 2 | 3 (Note: The sales for Yes or Yes and The Year of "Yes" are combined in Japan. Following the release of the reissue, Yes or Yes re-entered the Oricon Albums Chart at number 3.) | 72 | — | KOR: 254,248; JPN: 186,392 | KMCA: Platinum |
"—" denotes a recording that did not chart or was not released in that territory.

== Compilations ==
=== Compilation albums ===
Marketed by Warner Music Japan as a "Best Album".

List of compilation albums showing selected details, selected chart positions, sales figures and music recording certifications
| Title | Details | Peak chart positions | | | Sales | Certifications |
| Title | Details | JPN | JPN Hot | NZ Heat. | Sales | Certifications |
|---|---|---|---|---|---|---|
| #Twice | Released: June 28, 2017; Label: Warner Music Japan; Formats: CD, digital download, DVD, LP, streaming (Note: The digital download and streaming version of #Twice was released in EP format, only containing Japanese-language tracks.) | 2 | 2 | 8 | JPN: 356,938 | RIAJ: Platinum |
| #Twice2 | Released: March 6, 2019; Label: Warner Music Japan; Formats: CD, digital download, DVD, LP, streaming (Note: The digital download and streaming version of #Twice2 was released in EP format, only containing Japanese-language tracks.) | 1 | 1 | — | JPN: 323,817 | RIAJ: Platinum |
| #Twice3 | Released: September 16, 2020; Label: Warner Music Japan; Formats: CD, digital download, DVD, LP, streaming (Note: The digital download and streaming version of #Twice3 was released in EP format, only containing Japanese-language tracks.) | 1 | 1 | — | JPN: 147,325 | RIAJ: Gold |
| #Twice4 | Released: March 16, 2022; Label: Warner Music Japan; Formats: CD, digital download, DVD, LP, streaming (Note: The digital download and streaming version of #Twice4 was released in EP format, only containing Japanese-language tracks.) | 1 | 1 | — | JPN: 87,503 | RIAJ: Gold |
| #Twice5 | Released: May 14, 2025; Label: Warner Music Japan; Formats: CD, digital download, DVD, streaming (Note: The digital download and streaming version of #Twice5 was released in EP format, only containing Japanese-language tracks.) | 3 | 6 | — | JPN: 85,834 | RIAJ: Gold |
| #Best 2015–2025 | Released: August 26, 2026; Label: Warner Music Japan; Formats: Blu-ray, CD, digital download, streaming; Track listing: Disc 1; 1. "Like Ooh-Ahh"; 2. "Cheer Up"; 3. "TT"; 4. "Knock Knock"; 5. "Signal"; 6. "Likey"; 7. "Heart Shaker"; 8. "What Is Love?"; 9. "Dance the Night Away"; 10. "Yes or Yes"; 11. "The Best Thing I Ever Did"; 12. "Fancy"; 13. "Feel Special"; Disc 2; 1. "More & More"; 2. "I Can't Stop Me"; 3. "Cry for Me"; 4. "Alcohol-Free"; 5. "The Feels"; 6. "Scientist"; 7. "Talk That Talk"; 8. "Moonlight Sunrise"; 9. "Set Me Free"; 10. "I Got You"; 11. "One Spark"; 12. "Strategy"; 13. "This Is For"; 14. "Me+You"; Disc 3; 1. "Like Ooh-Ahh" (Japanese ver.); 2. "Cheer Up" (Japanese ver.); 3. "TT" (Japanese ver.); 4. "Knock Knock" (Japanese ver.); 5. "Signal" (Japanese ver.); 6. "Likey" (Japanese ver.); 7. "Heart Shaker" (Japanese ver.); 8. "What Is Love?" (Japanese ver.); 9. "Dance the Night Away" (Japanese ver.); 10. "Yes or Yes" (Japanese ver.); Disc 4; 1. "The Best Thing I Ever Did" (Japanese ver.); 2. "Fancy" (Japanese ver.); 3. "Feel Special" (Japanese ver.); 4. "More & More" (Japanese ver.); 5. "Stuck in My Head" (Japanese ver.); 6. "21:29" (Japanese ver.); 7. "I Can't Stop Me" (Japanese ver.); 8. "Cry for Me" (Japanese ver.); 9. "Alcohol-Free" (Japanese ver.); 10. "Scientist" (Japanese ver.); 11. "Talk That Talk" (Japanese ver.); 12. "Set Me Free" (Japanese ver.); 13. "One Spark" (Japanese ver.) | 4 | 10 | — | JPN: 20,646 | |
"—" denotes a recording that did not chart or was not released in that territory.

=== Compilation extended plays ===
List of compilation extended plays showing selected details and chart positions
| Title | Details | Peak chart positions |
| Title | Details | JPN Hot |
|---|---|---|
| What's Twice? | Released: February 24, 2017; Label: Warner Music Japan; Formats: Digital download, streaming | 16 |

== Live albums ==
List of live albums showing selected details, selected chart positions and sales figures
| Title | Details | Peak chart positions | | | | | Sales |
| Title | Details | KOR | JPN | JPN Hot | US Sales | US World | Sales |
|---|---|---|---|---|---|---|---|
| This Is For World Tour Finale in Seoul – Live | Released: October 16, 2026; Label: JYP Entertainment, Republic; Formats: Digital download, LP, streaming | 24 | 68 | 68 | 6 | 5 | KOR: 8,773 |

== Remix albums ==
List of remix albums showing selected details and chart positions
| Title | Details | Peak chart positions |
| Title | Details | JPN Hot |
|---|---|---|
| The Remixes | Released: November 22, 2023; Label: JYP Entertainment, Republic; Formats: Digital download, streaming | 73 |
