= List of songs recorded by Twice =

Twice in 2026.

The following is a list of songs recorded by South Korean girl group Twice. As of date, the girl group has officially released 257 songs. (Note: 258 total songs consist of: 133 songs originally recorded in Korean; 64 songs originally recorded in Japanese; 28 songs originally recorded in English; 23 Japanese versions of songs originally recorded in Korean; 6 English versions of songs originally recorded in Korean; 3 Korean versions of songs originally recorded in Japanese; 1 Korean version of a song originally recorded in English) 133 songs are originally recorded in Korean, 64 are originally in Japanese and 28 are originally in English. Additionally, 33 songs are versions of songs originally recorded in a different language.

The group composed of nine members; Nayeon, Jeongyeon, Momo, Sana, Jihyo, Mina, Dahyun, Chaeyoung and Tzuyu, was formed by JYP Entertainment in July 2015 through the survival television show Sixteen. The group holds the record for having the most officially released songs for a South Korean girl group.

Indicates a single release

== Songs originally recorded in Korean ==
List of Korean songs, showing year released, writers name and originating album
Song	Year	Writer(s)	Originating album	Ref.
"1 to 10"	2016	Chloe; Noday	Twicecoaster: Lane 1	
"1, 3, 2" (Note: Performed by Jeongyeon, Mina and Tzuyu.)	2021	Shim Eun-ji	Formula of Love: O+T=<3	
"21:29" (Note: The Japanese version was released as part of #Twice3 in 2020.)	2019	MonoTree; Sophiya; Nayeon; Jeongyeon; Momo; Sana; Jihyo; Mina; Dahyun; Chaeyoung; Tzuyu	Feel Special	
"24/7"	2017	Cazzi Opeia; Jihyo; Nayeon	Twicetagram	
"After Moon"	2018	C-no; Iggy; Woong Kim	Yes or Yes	
"Alcohol-Free" (Note: The Japanese version was released as part of #Twice4 in 2022. The English version was released as part of The Remixes in 2023.)	2021	J.Y. Park	Taste of Love	
"Baby Blue Love"	2021	Nayeon	Taste of Love	
"Basics"	2022	Chaeyoung	Between 1&2	
"Behind the Mask"	2020	Heize	Eyes Wide Open	
"Believer"	2020	Kenzie	Eyes Wide Open	
"The Best Thing I Ever Did" (Note: The Japanese version was released as a B-side for "Happy Happy" in 2019.) (올해 제일 잘한 일)	2018	Glory Face; J.Y. Park; Jamie; Jinli; Justin Reinstein; Min Lee Collapsedone; Woomin Lee	The Year of "Yes"	
"Blame It on Me"	2023	Dahyun	Ready to Be	
"Bloom"	2024	Jeongyeon	With You-th	
"Brave"	2022	Lee Seu-ran; Slow Rabbit; Cho Yoon-kyung; Noh Joo-hwan	Between 1&2	
"Bring It Back"	2020	Dahyun	Eyes Wide Open	
"Cactus" (선인장)	2021	Jihyo	Formula of Love: O+T=<3	
"Candy Boy"	2015	Chloe Leighton; Garrick Smith; Julia Michaels; Kim Eun Soo	The Story Begins	
"Cheer Up" (Note: The Japanese version was released as part of #Twice in 2017.)	2016	Black Eyed V Sam Lewis	Page Two	
"Chillax"	2018	Chang Kyum Kim; Jeonghoon Kang	Summer Nights	
"Conversation"	2021	Sana	Taste of Love	
"Crazy Stupid Love"	2023	Dahyun	Ready to Be	
"Cruel"	2021	Dahyun	Formula of Love: O+T=<3	
"Cry for Me" (Note: The English version was released as part of the physical edition of Taste of Love in 2021. The Japanese version was released as part of #Twice4 in 2022.)	2020	J.Y. Park; Heize	Non-album single	
"Dance the Night Away" (Note: The Japanese version was released as part of #Twice2 in 2019.)	2018	Seung Eun Oh	Summer Nights	
"Deja Vu"	2018	Anne Judith Stokke Wik; Chloe; Erik Johansen; Hayley Michelle Aitken; Jan Hallvard Larsen; Nermin Harambasic; Ronny Vidar Svendsen	What Is Love?	
"Depend on You"	2020	Nayeon	Eyes Wide Open	
"Ding Dong"	2017	Jowul	Twicetagram	
"Do It Again" (다시 해줘)	2015	J.Y. Park	The Story Begins	
"Do What We Like"	2020	Sana	Eyes Wide Open	
"Don't Call Me Again"	2020	Park Yisu	More & More	
"Don't Give Up" (힘내!)	2017	Chaeyoung	Twicetagram	
"Espresso"	2021	Mospick; Young Chance	Formula of Love: O+T=<3	
"Eye Eye Eyes"	2017	Chaeyoung; Erlend Elvesveen; Jihyo	Signal	
"F.I.L.A. (Fall in Love Again)"	2021	Nayeon	Formula of Love: O+T=<3	
"Fancy" (Note: The Japanese version was released as a B-side for "Breakthrough" in 2019.)	2019	Black Eyed Pilseung; Jeon Goon	Fancy You	
"Feel Special" (Note: The Japanese version was released as part of #Twice3 in 2020.)	2019	J.Y. Park	Feel Special	
"FFW"	2017	Assbrass; Reign White	Twicetagram	
"Firework"	2020	Soo-jeong Kim	More & More	
"First Time"	2021	Jihyo	Taste of Love	
"Get Loud"	2019	JQ; Jihyo	Feel Special	
"Girls Like Us"	2019	Charli XCX; Dimitri Tikovoi; Jihyo; MNEK; Maya von Doll	Fancy You	
"Go Hard"	2020	Friday (Galactika)	Eyes Wide Open	
"Going Crazy" (미쳤나봐)	2015	Daniel Kim	The Story Begins	
"Gone"	2022	Dahyun	Between 1&2	
"Got the Thrills"	2023	MRCH	Ready to Be	
"Handle It"	2020	Chaeyoung	Eyes Wide Open	
"Heart Shaker" (Note: The Japanese version was released as part of #Twice2 in 2019.)	2017	Galactika	Merry & Happy	
"Hell in Heaven"	2020	Hae Sol Lee; Sim Eun Jee	Eyes Wide Open	
"Hello" (Note: Performed by Chaeyoung, Momo and Nayeon.)	2021	Jed; Luke; Davidior	Formula of Love: O+T=<3	
"Hi Hello"	2025	Lee Eun-hwa; Megan Bülow; Simon Wilcox; Matthew Holmes; Phil Leigh	This Is For	
"Ho!"	2018	Jaems G Morales; Jihyo; Joren van der Voort; Julio David Rodriguez; Matthew Morales; Mikey Blue	What Is Love?	
"Hold Me Tight"	2017	Jowool	Signal	
"Hot"	2019	Jonatan Gusmark (Moonshine); Kang Eun Jung; Momo	Fancy You	
"I Can't Stop Me" (Note: The English version was released as a digital single in 2020. The Japanese version was released as part of #Twice4 in 2022.)	2020	A Wright; J.Y. Park; Melanie Fontana; Michel "Lindgren" Schulz; Sim Eun Jee	Eyes Wide Open	
"I Love You More Than Anyone"	2021	Joomin	Hospital Playlist Season 2 OST Part 4	
"I'll Show You" (with K/DA and Bekuh Boom featuring Annika Wells)	2020	Bekuh Boom; Sebastien Najand	All Out	
"I'm Gonna Be a Star"	2016	Frants; Olltii; Park; The Vanderveers	Page Two	
"Ice Cream" (녹아요)	2017	Chang Rak Kim; Kyung Soo Han	Twicecoaster: Lane 2	
"Jaljayo Good Night" (잘자요 굿나잇)	2017	Kevin G Cho	Twicetagram	
"Jelly Jelly"	2016	Jowool	Twicecoaster: Lane 1	
"Keeper"	2024	Dahyun	Strategy	
"Knock Knock" (Note: The Japanese version was released as part of #Twice in 2017.)	2017	Eun Jee Sim; Mayu Wakisaka; Min Lee Collapsedone	Twicecoaster: Lane 2	
"LaLaLa"	2018	Jeongyeon	Yes or Yes	
"Last Waltz"	2021	Shim Eun-ji	Formula of Love: O+T=<3	
"Like a Fool"	2015	Daniel Kim	The Story Begins	
"Like It Like It"	2024	Youra (Full8loom); Chari (153/Joombas); Rizin (153/Joombas); Lee Hyeong-seok	Strategy	
"Like Ooh-Ahh (OOH-AHH하게)" (Note: The Japanese version was released as part of #Twice in 2017.)	2015	Joo Young Song; Kyu SUng Choi; Sam Lewis	The Story Begins	
"Likey" (Note: The Japanese version was released as a digital single in 2019.)	2017	Black Eyed Pilseung; Jeon Goon	Twicetagram	
"Look at Me" (날 바라바라봐)	2017	Woo Hye-rim	Twicetagram	
"Love Foolish"	2019	Shim Eun-Ji; Momo	Feel Special	
"Love Line"	2017	Jeongyeon	Twicetagram	
"Make Me Go"	2020	Nayeon	More & More	
"Mars"	2025	Jinli	This Is For	
"Merry & Happy"	2017	J.Y. Park	Merry & Happy	
"Missing U"	2017	Chaeyoung; Dahyun; Earattack	Twicetagram	
"More & More" (Note: The Japanese version was released as a B-side of "Fanfare" in 2020. The English version was released as a digital single in 2020.)	2020	Bibi; J.Y. Park	More & More	
"My Headphones On" (Headphone 써)	2016	Didrik Thott; Eun-Soo Kim; Niclas Kings; Ylva Dimberg	Page Two	
"New New"	2024	Lee Seu-ran	With You-th	
"Next Page"	2016	Maeel	Twicecoaster: Lane 1	
"One in a Million"	2016	Mr. Cho	Twicecoaster: Lane 1	
"One Spark" (Note: The English version was released as part of the digital EP single of "One Spark" in 2024. The Japanese version was released as part of #Twice5 in 2025.)	2024	Sim Eunjee; Melanie Fontana	With You-th	
"Only You" (Only 너)	2017	Ha:tfelt	Signal	
"Oxygen"	2020	JQ; Jung il kwon	More & More	
"Pit-A-Pat"	2016	Yorkie	Twicecoaster: Lane 1	
"Ponytail"	2016	Sin-seong Lee; Woo-seuk Yoon; Zigzag Note	Twicecoaster: Lane 1	
"Precious Love" (소중한 사랑)	2016	J.Y. Park	Page Two	
"Push & Pull" (Note: Performed by Dahyun, Jihyo and Sana.)	2021	Lee Seu-ran	Formula of Love: O+T=<3	
"Queen"	2020	Dahyun	Eyes Wide Open	
"Rainbow"	2019	Nayeon	Feel Special	
"Real You"	2021	Jihyo	Formula of Love: O+T=<3	
"Rewind" (알고 싶지 않아)	2021	E.One	Formula of Love: O+T=<3	
"Rollin'"	2017	Earattack; Yukki	Twicetagram	
"Rush"	2024	Chaeyoung	With You-th	
"Say Something"	2020	E.one; Iggy	Eyes Wide Open	
"Say Yes"	2018	Joohyoung Lee	What Is Love?	
"Say You Love Me"	2018	Secret Weapon; Sophia Pae	Yes or Yes	
"Scandal"	2021	Dahyun	Taste of Love	
"Scientist" (Note: The Japanese version was released as a digital single in 2022.)	2021	Shim Eun-ji	Formula of Love: O+T=<3	
"Seesaw"	2025	Lee Seu-ran	This Is For	
"Set Me Free" (Note: The English version was released as part of Ready to Be in 2023. The Japanese version was released as part of #Twice5 in 2025.)	2023	Star Wars (Galactika); Jvde (Galactika); Melanie Fontana (Note: English version); Michel "Lindgren" Schulz	Ready to Be	
"Shadow"	2020	Cho; Yun Kyoung	More & More	
"Shot Clock"	2020	Emily Yeonseo Kim	Eyes Wide Open	
"Shot Thru The Heart"	2018	David Anthony Eames; Mina; Momo; Sana	Summer Nights	
"Signal" (Note: The Japanese version was released as a digital single in 2017.)	2017	J.Y. Park	Signal	
"Someone Like Me"	2017	Anastasia Whiteacre; Christopher Petrosino Jr. Kyle Trewartha; Michael Trewartha; Robert Andrew McCurdy; Won Park	Signal	
"SOS"	2021	Dahyun	Taste of Love	
"Strawberry"	2019	Chaeyoung; Eun Su Kim	Fancy You	
"Stuck"	2018	Chang Kyum Kim; Val Del Prete	What Is Love?	
"Stuck in My Head" (Note: The Japanese version was released as a digital single in 2020.)	2019	Seu Ran Lee	Fancy You	
"Sunset"	2018	Jihyo	Yes or Yes	
"Sweet Summer Day"	2020	Chaeyoung; Jeongyeon	More & More	
"Sweet Talker"	2018	Chaeyoung; Erik Lidbom; Jeongyeon; Julie Yu; Michael Cheung	What Is Love?	
"Sweetest Obsession"	2024	Geum Ru-na (Lalala Studio)	Strategy	
"Talk That Talk" (Note: The Japanese version was released as part of #Twice5 in 2025.)	2022	danke (Lalala Studio)	Between 1&2	
"Three Times a Day" (하루에 세번)	2017	Dia; Won Kim	Signal	
"Touchdown"	2016	Mafly	Page Two	
"Trick It"	2019	Dahyun; JQ	Feel Special	
"Trouble"	2022	Jihyo	Between 1&2	
"Truth"	2015	Anne Judith Stokke Wik; Jin Suk Choi; Tatiauna Taniese Matthews; Xin Xin Gao	The Story Begins	
"TT" (Note: The Japanese version was released as a digital single in 2017.)	2016	Sam Lewis	Twicecoaster: Lane 1	
"Tuk Tok" (툭하면 톡)	2016	Choi Jin Seok; Courtney Woolsey; Emmanuel Jimenez; Minji Kim; Ronald 'av' Ndlouv; Stacy Hebert	Page Two	
"Turn It Up"	2019	Earattack; Sana	Fancy You	
"Turtle" (거북이)	2017	Jeong Ho-hyun	Twicetagram	
"Up No More"	2020	Jihyo	Eyes Wide Open	
"Wallflower"	2023	JQ	Ready to Be	
"What Is Love?" (Note: The Japanese version was released as a digital single in 2019.)	2018	J.Y. Park	What Is Love?	
"When We Were Kids"	2022	Dahyun	Between 1&2	
"Woohoo"	2016	Glory Face; Jinri	Page Two	
"Wow"	2017	Kako; Kriz; Mafly; Miso Lee	Twicetagram	
"Yes or Yes" (Note: The Japanese version was released as part of #Twice2 in 2019.)	2018	Shim Eun-Ji	Yes or Yes	
"You Get Me"	2024	Dahyun	With You-th	
"You in My Heart" (널 내게 담아)	2017	Choi Hyun Joon; Hohyun Jung	Twicetagram	
"Young & Wild"	2018	Chaeyoung; Flying Lab	Yes or Yes	

== Songs originally recorded in Japanese ==
List of Japanese songs, showing year released, writers name and originating album
Song	Year	Writer(s)	Originating album	Ref.
"BDZ" (Note: The Korean version was released as part of Yes or Yes in 2018.)	2018	J.Y. Park; Shoko Fujibayashi; Yu Shimoji	BDZ	
"Be as One" (Note: The Korean version was released as part of The Year of "Yes" in 2018.)	2018	Risa Horie	BDZ	
"Be OK"	2019	Shoko Fujibayashi	&Twice	
"Better"	2020	Lauren Kaori; Mio Jorakuji	Perfect World	
"Beyond the Horizon"	2024	Yu-ki Kobubo; YHEL	Dive	
"Bitter Sweet"	2022	Co-sho	Celebrate	
"Blind in Love"	2025	Nara	Enemy	
"Brand New Girl"	2018	Na.Zu.Na; Yu-ki Kokubo	BDZ	
"Breakthrough" (Note: The Korean version was released as part of Feel Special in 2019.)	2019	Yu Shimoji; Olivia Choi (Note: Korean version)	&Twice	
"Candy Pop"	2018	Mayu Wakisaka; Min Lee Collapsedone	BDZ	
"Catch a Wave"	2023	Mayu Wakisaka	Hare Hare (b-side)	
"Celebrate"	2022	J.Y. Park; Nayeon; Jeongyeon; Momo; Sana; Jihyo; Mina; Dahyun; Chaeyoung; Tzuyu; Co-sho	Celebrate	
"Changing!"	2019	Yu Shimoji	&Twice	
"Dance Again"	2023	Co-sho	Dive	
"Dive"	2024	Yoon; Kelbyul; Fla Dawon; Yu-ki Kokubo	Dive	
"Doughnut"	2021	Lauren Kaori	Celebrate	
"Echoes of Heart"	2024	Gratia	Dive	
"Enemy"	2025	Kakinuma Masami; Rizin (153/Joombas); Jiwon (153/Joombas); Imlay	Enemy	
"Fake & True"	2019	Jam9	&Twice	
"Fanfare"	2020	Chiemi	Perfect World	
"Fine"	2025	Mayu Wakisaka	Enemy	
"Flow Like Waves"	2022	Shoko Fujibayashi	Celebrate	
"Four-leaf Clover"	2021	Mayu Wakisaka	Perfect World	
"Glow"	2025	Dahyun; Nara; Val Del Prete	Enemy	
"Good at Love"	2021	Mayu Wakisaka	Perfect World	
"Happy Happy"	2019	Yu Shimoji	&Twice	
"Hare Hare"	2023	Seo Yongwon; Yu-ki Kokubo	Dive	
"Here I Am"	2024	Kakinuma Masami	Dive	
"How U Doin'"	2019	Chaeyoung; Risa Horie	&Twice	
"In the Summer"	2021	Yuka Matsumoto	Perfect World	
"Inside of Me"	2024	Co-sho	Dive	
"Just Be Yourself"	2022	FanFan	Celebrate	
"Kura Kura"	2021	J.Y. Park; Yu-Ki Kokubo	Perfect World	
"L.O.V.E."	2018	Na.Zu.Na; Yhanael; Yu-Ki Kokubo	BDZ	
"Like 1"	2025	Jihyo; Sofia Vivere; Yu-Ki Kokubo	Enemy	
"Love Is More"	2025	Masami	Enemy	
"Love Warning"	2024	Kakinuma Masami; YHEL	Dive	
"Luv Me"	2017	Yuka Matsumoto	One More Time (b-side)	
"Ocean Deep"	2024	Dayoung Jeong; Yu-ki Kokubo	Dive	
"One Day"	2025	Hiyori Nara	Enemy	
"One More Time"	2017	Natsumi Watanabe; Yhanael	BDZ	
"Peach Soda"	2024	Rose Blueming	Dive	
"Perfect World"	2021	Risa Horie	Perfect World	
"Pieces of Love"	2021	Lauren Kaori	Perfect World	
"Pink Lemonade"	2018	Lauren Kaori; Yu-Ki Kokubo	Wake Me Up (b-side)	
"Polish"	2019	Lauren Kaori; Yu-Ki Kokubo	&Twice	
"Promise"	2021	Karen Yamaguchi	Perfect World	
"The Reason Why"	2019	Natsumi Watanabe	&Twice	
"Sandcastle"	2022	Yu-ki Kokubo	Celebrate	
"Say It Again"	2018	Mayu Wakisaka; Min Lee Collapsedone	BDZ	
"Scorpion"	2020	Kiee	Better (B-side)	
"Stay by My Side"	2018	Fredrik Figge Boström; Lauren Kaori; Malin Johansson	BDZ	
"Strawberry Moon"	2021	Yuka Matsumoto	Kura Kura (b-side)	
"Stronger"	2019	Eri Osanai	&Twice	
"Swing"	2020	Yuka Matsumoto	&Twice	
"Thank You, Family"	2021	Jam9	Perfect World	
"That's All I'm Saying"	2022	Dahyun; Risa Horie	Celebrate	
"Tick Tock"	2022	Dahyun; Mayu Wakisaka	Celebrate	
"Up to You"	2025	Dahyun; Chiaki Nagasawa; Saori Nagano; Takahito Nakamura	Enemy	
"Voices of Delight"	2022	Starbuck; Yhel	Celebrate	
"Wake Me Up"	2018	Natsumi Watanabe	BDZ	
"The Wish"	2024	Rose Blueming	Enemy	
"Wishing"	2018	Eri Osanai	BDZ	
"Wonderful Day"	2021	Shoko Fujibayashi	Doughnut (b-side)	

== Songs originally recorded in English ==
List of English songs, showing year released, writers name and originating album
Song	Year	Writer(s)	Originating album	Ref.
"Battitude" (Note: Performed by Nayeon, Jeongyeon, Momo and Mina.)	2025	Miranda Glory Inzunza; Alexis Andrea Boyd	This Is For	
"Candy"	2021	Lewis Shay Jankel Pka Shift K3y	Formula of Love: O+T=<3	
"Dat Ahh Dat Ooh" (Note: Performed by Sana, Jihyo, Dahyun, Chaeyoung and Tzuyu.)	2025	Kabba; MNEK; Baby Tate; Jamal Woon	This Is For	
"The Feels" (Note: The Korean version was released as part of the physical edition of Formula of Love: O+T=<3 in 2021.)	2021	Anna Timgren; Boy Matthews; Justin Reinstein; Woo Min Lee collapsedone	Non-album single	
"Four"	2025	Sim Eun-jee	This Is For	
"G.O.A.T." (Note: Performed by Mina, Dahyun and Chaeyoung.)	2025	Gusten Dahlqvist; Arineh Karimi	This Is For	
"Heartbreak Avenue"	2025	Ari PenSmith; Angelina Sherie	This Is For	
"I Got You"	2024	Jonah Marais; Daniel Seavey; David Wilson; Jake Torrey; Lexxi Saal	With You-th	
"I Want You Back"	2018	Alphonso James Mizell; Berry Gordy; Deke Richards; Frederick James Perren	BDZ	
"Icon"	2021	Melanie Fontana; GG Ramirez	Formula of Love: O+T=<3	
"Kiss My Troubles Away"	2024	Lauren Aquilina; Albert Stanaj; Ryan Marrone	Strategy	
"Let Love Go" (Note: Performed by Jeongyeon, Momo, Sana and Tzuyu.)	2025	Amy Allen; Boy Matthews; Cleo Tighe; Kyle Buckley	This Is For	
"Magical"	2024	Johan Fransson; Autumn Marie Buysse	Strategy	
"Mamushi" (remix) (Note: Credited as Megan Thee Stallion featuring Twice.)	2024	Megan Pete; PK. Ota; Nija Charles; Tre'Von Waters	Megan: Act II	
"Me+You"	2025	Kenzie; Charli Taft; Daniel “Obi” Klein; Nayeon; Jeongyeon; Momo; Sana; Jihyo; Mina; Dahyun; Chaeyoung; Tzuyu	Ten: The Story Goes On	
"Moonlight"	2021	Michael Pollack; Jake Torrey; Destiny Rogers	Formula of Love: O+T=<3	
"Moonlight Sunrise"	2023	Earattack; Nina Ann Nelson; Kaedi Dalley; Lee Woo-hyun	Ready to Be	
"Options"	2025	Taet Chesterton; Iain James	This Is For	
"Peach Gelato"	2025	Mick Coogan; John Ryan; Julian Bunetta	This Is For	
"Queen of Hearts"	2022	Greg Bonnick; Hayden Chapman; Paulina Cerrilla; Kyler Niko	Between 1&2	
"Right Hand Girl"	2025	Taneisha Jackson; Georgia Ku; Morgan Connie Smith; James Daniel Lewis	This Is For	
"Strategy" (Note: Two versions of the song were officially released: A version featuring Megan Thee Stallion and a version without Stallion.)	2024	Boy Matthews; Cleo Tighe; Megan Pete	Strategy	
"Superstars" (with Saweetie)	2025	Bianca Atterberry; Diamonté Harper; Edgar Ferrera; Gregory "Aldae" Hein; Jason Cornett; Jon Bellion; Jordan K Johnson; Larry Jacks Jr. Pete Nappi; Randall Hammers; Stefan Johnson	Non-album single	
"Takedown" (Note: Performed by Chaeyoung, Jeongyeon and Jihyo.)	2025	Lindgren	KPop Demon Hunters (Soundtrack from the Netflix Film)	
"Talk" (Note: Performed by Nayeon and Jihyo.)	2025	Taet Chesterton	This Is For	
"This Is For"	2025	Tayla Parx; Em Walcott	This Is For	
"We Pray" (Twice version, with Coldplay)	2025	Andrés Torres; Chris Martin; Damini Ogulu; Davide Ross; Elian Margieh; Guy Berryman; Ilya Salmanzadeh; Jonny Buckland; Martina Stoessel; Mauricio Rengifo; Max Martin; Shawn Carter; Sim Eunjee; Simbiatu Ajikawo; Will Champion	Non-album single	
"What You Waiting For"	2019	Mayu Wakisaka; Min Lee Collapsedone	&Twice	
