= What's Twice? =

2017 extended play by Twice

EP by Twice
- Released: February 24, 2017
- Studio: JYPE Studios
- Genre: K-pop; dance
- Length: 14:00
- Language: Korean; English
- Label: Warner Music Japan

Twice chronology
Twicecoaster: Lane 2 (2017)	What's Twice? (2017)	Signal (2017)

What's Twice? is the first compilation extended play by South Korean girl group Twice. It was released exclusively in Japan on February 24, 2017, by Warner Music Japan and features four of Twice's Korean songs from their first three extended plays: The Story Begins (2015), Page Two (2016) and Twicecoaster: Lane 1 (2016).

What's Twice? was released as the promotional tool for Twice's announcement on February 24, 2017, for their Japanese debut in June 2017. Their first Japanese album, #Twice, was released on June 28, 2017, and is a compilation of Japanese versions of their previous Korean singles. #Twice debuted and peaked at No. 2 on the Oricon Albums Chart and was certified Platinum by the Recording Industry Association of Japan (RIAJ) by selling over 250,000 physical copies.

== Track listing ==
What's Twice? track listing
No.	Title	Lyrics	Music	Arrangement	Length
1.	"Like Ooh-Ahh"	Black Eyed Pilseung; Sam Lewis	Black Eyed Pilseung; Lewis	Rado	3:35
2.	"Cheer Up"	Sam Lewis	Black Eyed Pilseung	Rado	3:28
3.	"Touchdown"	Mafly	Krissie Karlsson; Karl Karlsson; Nicki Karlsson; EJ Show (Zoobeater Sound)	The Karlsson's; EJ Show	3:22
4.	"TT"	Sam Lewis	Black Eyed Pilseung	Rado	3:32
Total length:					14:00

== Charts ==
Chart (2017)	Peak position
Japan Hot Albums (Billboard)	16
