= Twice discography =

Twice discography may refer to:

- Twice albums discography
- Twice singles discography
- List of songs recorded by Twice
