= Twice (disambiguation) =

Twice is a South Korean girl group.

Twice may also refer to:

== Literature ==
- Twice (magazine), a consumer electronics trade magazine
- Twice (novel), a novel by Lisa Miscione
- Twice (novel), a novel by Mitch Albom

== Music ==
- Twice (Hollie Cook album) (2014)
- Twice (The Tyde album) (2003)
- Twice, a 2009 EP by Yeti Lane
- "Twice", a 2015 song by Ludovico Einaudi and the Amsterdam Sinfonietta from Elements
- "Twice" (song), a 2018 song by Christina Aguilera
- "Twice", a 2016 song by Catfish and the Bottlemen from The Ride
- "Twice", a 2022 song by Charli XCX from Crash
- "Twice", a 2023 song by Romy from Mid Air

== Other uses ==
- Twice (adverb), multiplicative indicating 'two times'
- Twice (online retailer), an American online marketplace
- Twice (My Hero Academia), a character in My Hero Academia

== See also ==
- #Twice and &Twice, albums by Twice
