= Blink Twice (disambiguation) =

Blink Twice is a 2024 film by Zoe Kravitz, originally entitled Pussy Island.

Blink Twice may also refer to:

== Film and television ==
- Blink Twice, a 2018 film anthology; see Drew Nelson (actor) and Morgan Kohan
- "Blink Twice", a 2023 episode of The Horror of Dolores Roach

== Music ==
=== Albums ===
- Blink Twice, a 2022 album by Arkells

=== Songs ===
- "Blink Twice" (Bini song), 2025
- "Blink Twice" (Shaboozey and Myles Smith song), 2025
- "Blink Twice" (Rose Gray song), 2026
- "Blink Twice", a 2024 song by Cecile Believe off the album Tender the Spark
- "Blink Twice", a 2003 song by Dressy Bessy off their eponymous album
- "Blink Twice", a 2019 song by Joy Oladokun

== See also ==
- Blink Once, a 2021 album by the Arkells
- Blink (disambiguation)
- Twice (disambiguation)
- Don't Blink (disambiguation)
