= Twicecoaster: Lane 2 =

2017 extended play by Twice

- Digital cover

EP (reissue) by Twice
- Released: February 20, 2017
- Studios: JYPE; Prelude; Trinity Sound; Paradise Music; U Productions; Kairos Music Group
- Genres: K-pop; dance
- Length: 29:55
- Languages: Korean; English
- Label: JYP
- Producer: J.Y. Park "The Asiansoul"

Twice chronology
Twicecoaster: Lane 1 (2016)	Twicecoaster: Lane 2 (2017)	What's Twice? (2017)

Singles from Twicecoaster: Lane 2
- 1. "Knock Knock" Released: February 20, 2017

Twicecoaster: Lane 2 is the reissue of South Korean girl group Twice's third extended play (EP), Twicecoaster: Lane 1. It was released on February 20, 2017, by JYP Entertainment. It contains thirteen tracks, including the lead single, "Knock Knock".

== Background and release ==
On January 18, 2017, it was reported that Twice would be releasing a special album after their concert in Seoul. In early February, Twice officially announced the release of the reissue of Twicecoaster: Lane 1, titled Twicecoaster: Lane 2, on February 20 with the brand new track "Knock Knock".

The track list for Twicecoaster: Lane 2 was revealed on February 12. It contains thirteen tracks: the seven songs from the original release, two additional new songs, a remix version and instrumental of "TT", and instrumental tracks of "Like Ooh-Ahh" from The Story Begins and "Cheer Up" from Page Two. The group concept images and individual teasers of Twice were released in the next four days.

Two music video teasers for "Knock Knock" were released on February 17 and 18. The first teaser started with a knock, which was heard at the end of the music video for "TT", while the second teaser showed the members dressed in various outfits that flash by in the stop-motion video.

The final group image teaser was released on February 19. Twice also greeted the fans via Naver V Live for a comeback countdown at 23:30 KST. The album and the music video for "Knock Knock" were officially released the next day. It was also released as a digital download on various music sites.

== Promotion ==
On February 20, 2017, Twice had a live broadcast on Naver V Live at 10:00 KST to celebrate their comeback with fans. The group talked about the album, the lead single "Knock Knock" and its music video, their first solo concert (held on February 17–19) and their subsequent Asian tour. They also performed the full choreography of "Knock Knock".

The next day, Twice recorded their appearance on You Hee-yeol's Sketchbook, their first variety show for Twicecoaster: Lane 2. The group's appearance aired on February 25 and was included in the show's special monthly episodes with the concept "Songs I want to sing for those in their 20s".

On February 23, Twice held their first comeback stage on M Countdown. It was then followed by performances on Music Bank, Show! Music Core and Inkigayo, on February 24–26. Promotion on music shows continued with The Show and Show Champion on March 7–8, and ended with a final performance on Inkigayo on March 12.

== Commercial performance ==
Twicecoaster: Lane 2 entered the Gaon Album Chart at number 1 and the Billboard World Albums at number 4, while "Knock Knock" entered the Gaon Digital Chart at number 1 and the Billboard World Digital Songs at number 5. The album sold 266,645 units in February 2017.

== Track listing ==
Twicecoaster: Lane 2 — Digital album
No.	Title	Lyrics	Music	Arrangement	Length
1.	"Knock Knock"	Sim Eun-jee; Min Lee "collapsedone"; Mayu Wakisaka	Min Lee "collapsedone"; Mayu Wakisaka	Min Lee "collapsedone"	3:15
2.	"Ice Cream" (녹아요; Nogayo; lit. '"Melting"')	Kim Chang-rak; Han Kyung-soo	Kim Chang-rak; Han Kyung-soo; Choi Han-seol; Pink Hound	Kim Chang-rak; Han Kyung-soo; Choi Han-seol; Pink Hound	3:52
3.	"TT"	Sam Lewis	Black Eyed Pilseung	Rado	3:32
4.	"1 to 10"	Chloe; Noday	Noday; Chloe	Noday; Chloe	2:55
5.	"Ponytail"	Lee Sin-seong; ZigZag Note	ZigZag Note	ZigZag Note; Noh Eun-jong	3:26
6.	"Jelly Jelly"	Jowul	east4A; Ashley Mounts; Kim Hee-deok	east4A	3:30
7.	"Pit-A-Pat"	Yorkie; Kang Ji-won	Kang Ji-won; Im Kwang-uk	Im Kwang-uk; Kang Ji-won	3:27
8.	"Next Page"	Maeel	Joe J. Lee "Kairos"	Joe J. Lee "Kairos"; Hobyn "K.O" Yi	2:55
9.	"One in a Million"	mr.cho	Sebastian Thott; Didrik Thott; Andreas Öberg; Danielle Senior	Sebastian Thott	2:55
Total length:					29:55

Twicecoaster: Lane 2 — Physical album bonus tracks
No.	Title	Lyrics	Music	Arrangement	Length
10.	"TT (Tak Remix)"	Sam Lewis	Black Eyed Pilseung	Tak	4:01
11.	"Like Ooh-Ahh (Inst.)" (OOH-AHH하게; Ooh-Ahh Hage)		Black Eyed Pilseung; Sam Lewis	Rado	3:37
12.	"Cheer Up (Inst.)"		Black Eyed Pilseung	Rado	3:29
13.	"TT (Inst.)"		Black Eyed Pilseung	Rado	3:35
Total length:					44:47

Twicecoaster: Lane 2 — Thailand edition bonus DVD
No.	Title	Length
1.	"Knock Knock" (Music Video)
2.	"Knock Knock" (Music Video Teaser 1)
3.	"Knock Knock" (Music Video Teaser 2)
4.	"Knock Knock" (Dance Practice Video)
5.	"Knock Knock" (Jacket Behind (Thai subtitle))

== Content production ==
Credits adapted from album liner notes.

=== Locations ===
Recording

- JYPE Studios, Seoul, South Korea
- Prelude Studio, Seoul, South Korea
- Trinity Sound Studio, Seoul, South Korea
- Paradise Music Studio, Seoul, South Korea
- U Productions Studio A, Seoul, South Korea
- Kairos Music Group, Los Angeles, California

Mixing

- JYPE Studios, Seoul, South Korea
- In Grid Studio, Seoul, South Korea
- W Sound Studio, Seoul, South Korea
- Echo Bar Studios, Los Angeles, California

Mastering

- Sonic Korea, Seoul, South Korea
- Sterling Sound, New York City, New York
- The Mastering Palace, New York City, New York

=== Personnel ===
- J. Y. Park "The Asiansoul" – producer
- Min Lee "collapsedone" – co-producer, all instruments and computer programming (on "Knock Knock")
- Mayu Wakisaka – co-producer and background vocals (on "Knock Knock")
- Sim Eun-jee – co-producer
- Lee Ji-young – direction and coordination (A&R)
- Jang Ha-na – music (A&R)
- Nam Jeong-min – music (A&R)
- Kim Ji-hyeong – production (A&R)
- Choi A-ra – production (A&R)
- Kim Bo-hyeon – design (A&R) and album design
- Kim Tae-eun - design (A&R) and album design
- Choi Hye-jin – recording and assistant mixing engineer
- Im Hong-jin – recording engineer
- Eom Se-hee – recording engineer
- Kim Yong-woon "goodear" – recording and mixing engineer
- Jo Han-sol "Fabio the Asian" – recording and assistant mixing engineer
- Lee Chang-seon – recording engineer
- Kim Si-cheol – recording engineer
- Yang Jeong-nam – recording engineer
- Brian U – recording engineer
- Kang Yeon-noo – recording engineer
- Park Sang-rok – assistant recording engineer
- Han Cheol-gyu – assistant recording engineer
- Jang Hong-seok – assistant recording engineer
- Wes Koz – assistant recording engineer and acoustic guitar (on "Next Page")
- Kevin Wong "Koncept" – assistant recording engineer
- Lee Tae-seob – mixing engineer
- Jeong Eun-kyeong – mixing engineer
- Jo Joon-seong – mixing engineer
- Bob Horn – mixing engineer
- Tak – mixing engineer, all instruments and computer programming (on "TT (Tak Remix)")
- Choi Ja-yeon – assistant mixing engineer
- Park Jeong-eon – mastering engineer
- Chris Gehringer – mastering engineer
- Dave Kutch – mastering engineer
- Will Quinnell – assistant mastering engineer
- Kim Young-jo (Naive Creative Production) – music video director
- Yoo Seung-woo (Naive Creative Production) – music video director
- Kim Young-joon (Agency Seed) – photographer
- Choi Hee-seon – style director
- Im Ji-hyeon – style director
- Park Nae-joo – hair director
- Won Jeong-yo – makeup director
- Kim Hyeong-woong – choreographer
- Yoon Hee-so – choreographer
- Lee Ji-hyeon – choreographer
- Jiggy Choi Young-joon – choreographer
- Today Art – printing
- Jowul – vocal production (on "Ice Cream")
- Choi Han-sol – computer programming (on "Ice Cream")
- Pink Hound – computer programming (on "Ice Cream")
- Jeong Jae-pil – guitar (on "Ice Cream")
- Lee Jeong-woo – bass (on "Ice Cream")
- Son Min-kyeong – background vocals (on "Ice Cream")
- Jeong Yoo-ri (CaSSeTTe08) – additional engineering (on "Ice Cream")
- Rado – all instruments and computer programming (on "TT", "Like Ooh-Ahh (Inst.)", "Cheer Up (Inst.)" and "TT (Inst.)")
- Jihyo – background vocals (on "TT")
- Nayeon – background vocals (on "TT")
- Noday – all instruments, keyboard and computer programming (on "1 to 10")
- Chloe – all instruments, keyboard, computer programming and background vocals (on "1 to 10")
- Kwon Phillip – guitar (on "1 to 10")
- Yoon Woo-seon – piano (on "Ponytail")
- Kim Ki-wook – bass (on "Ponytail")
- Hong Joon-ho – guitar (on "Ponytail")
- Lee Gyu-hyeong – drum (on "Ponytail")
- Lee Dae-hee – synthesizer (on "Ponytail")
- Kim So-hyeon – chorus (on "Ponytail") and background vocals (on "Pit-a-Pat")
- east4A – all instruments and computer programming (on "Jelly Jelly")
- Jeong Jin-ha – background vocals (on "Jelly Jelly")
- Im Kwang-wook – all instruments and computer programming (on "Pit-a-Pat")
- Kang Ji-won – all instruments and computer programming (on "Pit-a-Pat")
- Joe J. Lee "Kairos" – all instruments and vocal production (on "Next Page")
- Hobyn "K.O" Yi – all instruments, keyboards, computer programming and vocal production (on "Next Page")
- Samuel J Lee – bass and vocal production (on "Next Page")
- Esther Park "Legaci" – background vocals and vocal production (on "Next Page")
- Bei Zhang – background vocals (on "Next Page")
- Wes Kosakowski – additional engineering (on "Next Page")
- Sebastian Thott – all instruments, computer programming and guitars (on "One in a Million")
- Andreas Öberg – guitars (on "One in a Million")
- Lee Da-jeong – background vocals (on "One in a Million")

== Charts ==
=== Weekly charts ===
Chart (2017)	Peak position
South Korean Albums (Gaon)	1
US World Albums (Billboard)	4

=== Year-end charts ===
Chart (2017)	Position
South Korean Albums (Gaon)	15

== Accolades ==
Year	Award	Category	Result	Ref.
2018	7th Gaon Chart Music Awards	Artist of the Year – Physical Album (1st Quarter)	Nominated	

== Release history ==
Release dates and formats for Twicecoaster: Lane 2
Region	Date	Format(s)	Edition	Label	Ref.
Various	February 20, 2017	Digital download; streaming	Standard	JYP	
South Korea	February 20, 2017	CD	Standard	JYP	
Thailand	July 7, 2017	CD + DVD	Thailand	JYP; BEC-Tero Music	
