= Don't Blink (disambiguation) =

"Don't Blink" is a country music song recorded by Kenny Chesney. The phrase may also refer to:

- "Don't Blink", a song by Relient K from the album Collapsible Lung
- Don't Blink, a horror film
- Don't Blink – Robert Frank, a documentary film
- "Don't Blink", a repeated phrase from the Doctor Who episode Blink

== See also ==
- Blink Twice (disambiguation)
