= Signal (Twice song) =

2017 single by Twice

Single by Twice

from the EP Signal
- Language: Korean
- Released: May 15, 2017
- Genre: K-pop; electropop
- Length: 3:17
- Label: JYP
- Composers: Park Jin-young; Kairos
- Lyricist: Park Jin-young
- Producer: Park Jin-young

Twice singles chronology
"Knock Knock" (2017)	"Signal" (2017)	"One More Time" (2017)

Music video
- "Signal" on YouTube

"Signal" (stylized in all caps) is a song recorded by South Korean girl group Twice. The song was released on May 15, 2017, by JYP Entertainment and distributed by KT Music, as the lead single from their fourth extended play of the same name. The Japanese version of "Signal", along with its accompanying short version of the music video, was released on June 14, 2017, as a promotional single for their first Japanese compilation album, #Twice.

"Signal" was Twice's first lead single produced by JYP Entertainment founder Park Jin-young. The song won Song of the Year and Best Dance Performance – Female Group at the 2017 Mnet Asian Music Awards.

== Background and release ==
On May 1, 2017, JYP Entertainment announced Twice's comeback with their fourth EP Signal and its title track of the same name. The first music video teaser of "Signal" was uploaded online on May 13. It was released on the 15th as a digital download on various music sites. In June 2017, Twice released a compilation album titled #Twice which consists of ten songs including both Korean and Japanese-language versions of "Signal". The Japanese lyrics were written by Yu Shimoji and Samuelle Soung. "Signal (Japanese ver.)", along with its accompanying short version of the music video, was pre-released on June 14 as a promotional single of the album.

== Composition ==
"Signal"
"Signal" bases its music on the hip-hop rhythm of strong 808 bass mixed with rhythmic electronic music.

"Signal" was written by Park Jin-young and co-composed by Park and Kairos. This marked Twice's first collaboration with their agency's founder. The electropop song features a programmed Roland TR-808-style kick and hi-hat with incorporating hip hop elements. Lyrically, it expresses a girl's frustration who keeps sending "signs and signal" to hint her feelings for a guy but is unnoticed.

== Music video ==
The music video for "Signal" was directed by Naive Creative Production, the same team behind Twice's previous music videos. It surpassed 100 million views on YouTube on August 30, 2017, three months after the release. On December 7, it was announced that it ranked second place on YouTube's Most Popular Music Video in Korea of that year, only behind the top spot of "Knock Knock". It also ranked at No. 9 on 2017 YouTube's Top Trend Music Video in Japan.

It has a science fiction-fantasy theme featuring a green-headed alien and the nine members of Twice with their own superpowers: Nayeon's superpower is time reversing, Jeongyeon's is time freezing, Momo's is super speed, Sana's is invisibility, Jihyo's is x-ray vision, Mina's is hypnosis, Dahyun's is self-duplication, Chaeyoung's is telekinesis, and Tzuyu's is super strength. The cameraman who made an appearance in "Cheer Up" music video is also seen. At the end, the members transform into aliens.

== Commercial performance ==
"Signal" debuted at number 1 for two consecutive weeks and 4 on Gaon's Digital Chart and Billboard Japan Hot 100, respectively. It charted at number 1, 3 and 22 on K-pop Hot 100, Billboard charts' World Digital Song Sales and (Philippine Hot 100) respectively.

== Accolades ==
"Signal" won 12 music program awards in South Korea, including a triple crown on Music Bank and Inkigayo. At the 2017 Mnet Asian Music Awards, "Signal" won Song of the Year and Best Dance Performance – Female Group. It received a nomination for Best Music Video at the same ceremony and Artist of the Year – Digital Music (May) at the 7th Gaon Chart Music Awards, losing to "Spring Day" by BTS and "I Luv It" by Psy, respectively. It additionally received two weekly Melon Popularity Awards on May 29 and June 6, 2017.

Music program awards
Program	Date	Ref.
Show Champion	May 24, 2017	
Show Champion	May 31, 2017	
M Countdown	May 25, 2017	
M Countdown	June 1, 2017	
Music Bank	May 26, 2017	
Music Bank	June 9, 2017	
Music Bank	June 16, 2017	
Show! Music Core	May 27, 2017	
Show! Music Core	June 3, 2017	
Inkigayo	May 28, 2017	
Inkigayo	June 4, 2017	
Inkigayo	June 11, 2017	

== Charts ==
=== Weekly charts ===
Weekly chart performance
Chart (2017)	Peak position
Japan (Japan Hot 100)	4
Philippines (Philippine Hot 100)	22
South Korea (Gaon)	1
South Korea (Kpop Hot 100)	1
US World Digital Song Sales (Billboard)	3

=== Year-end charts ===
Year-end chart performance
Chart (2017)	Position
Japan (Japan Hot 100)	23
South Korean (Gaon)	30

== Certifications and sales ==
Certifications and sales
Region	Certification	Certified units/sales
South Korea	—	1,250,964
Streaming
Japan (RIAJ)	Gold	50,000,000^{†}
^{†} Streaming-only figures based on certification alone.

== See also ==
- List of Gaon Digital Chart number ones of 2017
- List of Kpop Hot 100 number ones
