= Twice (novel) =

- Author: Lisa Unger
- Language: English
- Genre: Crime fiction, Thriller
- Published: April 2004
- Publisher: Minotaur Books
- Publication place: United States

Twice is a novel by bestselling author Lisa Unger writing as Lisa Miscione. It is the third book featuring Lydia Strong.

== Reception ==
Susan Fernandez of the St. Petersburg Times praised the novel's characters, writing that Miscione "does a good job of keeping everyone straight" and that she "makes the chases in the tunnels beneath New York City believable." Publishers Weekly wrote: "A certain amount of suspense is generated along the way, especially for readers who can suspend disbelief, but Miscione finally loses her gamble by doubling her ante one time too many." Cindy Chow of January Magazine wrote: "Although the final solution to the murders in Twice may be rather unbelievable and surreal, it is the characters who shine and make this an enjoyable read."
