= Knock Knock (Twice song) =

2017 single by Twice

Single by Twice

from the EP Twicecoaster: Lane 2
- Language: Korean
- Released: February 20, 2017
- Genre: K-pop; bubblegum pop
- Length: 3:15
- Label: JYP
- Composers: Lee Woo-min "Collapsedone"; Mayu Wakisaka
- Lyricists: Shim Eun-jee; Lee Woo-min "Collapsedone"; Mayu Wakisaka

Twice singles chronology
"TT" (2016)	"Knock Knock" (2017)	"Signal" (2017)

Music video
- "Knock Knock" on YouTube

"Knock Knock" (stylized in all caps) is a song recorded by South Korean girl group Twice for their special album Twicecoaster: Lane 2 (2017). It was released by JYP Entertainment on February 20, 2017, as the album's lead single. Written by Shim Eun-jee, Lee Woo-min "Collapsedone", and Mayu Wakisaka, it is a bubblegum pop song with rock, disco, and electronic influences and a 1980s-inspired house beat.

== Background and release ==
"Knock Knock"
"Knock Knock" is a bubblegum pop song with rock, disco, and electronic influences.

On January 18, 2017, it was reported that Twice would be releasing a special album after their concert in Seoul. In early February, Twice officially announced the release of the reissue of Twicecoaster: Lane 1, titled Twicecoaster: Lane 2, on February 20 with a newly recorded track titled "Knock Knock".

Two music video teasers for "Knock Knock" were released on February 17 and 18 at midnight. The first teaser started with the sound of knock which was heard at the end of the music video for "TT", while the second teaser showed the members dressed in a variety of outfits that flash by in the stop-motion video. The final group image teaser was released on February 19 at midnight. Twice also greeted the fans via Naver V Live for a comeback countdown at 23:30 KST. The music video for "Knock Knock" was officially released the next day in conjunction with the release of the album. It was also released for digital download on various music sites.

== Music video ==
The music video for "Knock Knock" was directed by Naive Creative Production. Stop-motion effect was used in some of the scenes in the video. It earned almost 10 million views on YouTube within 24 hours of its release and became the fastest K-pop group music video to reach 30 million views, doing so in 152 hours. It was the most-viewed K-pop music video for the first half of 2017, and topped YouTube's Most Popular Music Video in Korea of that year. It also ranked at No. 10 on 2017 YouTube's Top Trend Music Video in Japan.

The music video features Twice having fun at a slumber party and snowball fight. Producer Park Jin-young, founder of JYP Entertainment, also has a short appearance. The last scene has the same ending as that of the music video for "TT".

== Reception ==
"Knock Knock" was a commercial success in South Korea. It debuted atop the Gaon Digital Chart for the week ending February 25, 2017, accumulating 319,957 downloads and 7,136,193 streams within its first week of release. The following week, the song dropped to number two on the chart, with 141,204 downloads and 6,965,178 streams. The single additionally peaked at numbers 5 and 15 on the World Digital Song Sales and Japan Hot 100, respectively.

The song ranked at number 16 on Dazed's 20 Best K-pop Songs of 2017. "Knock Knock" surpassed 100 million streams in November 2017 and 2,500,000 downloads in September 2019 on the Gaon Music Chart.

The song appears in the movie Spies in Disguise.

== Promotion ==
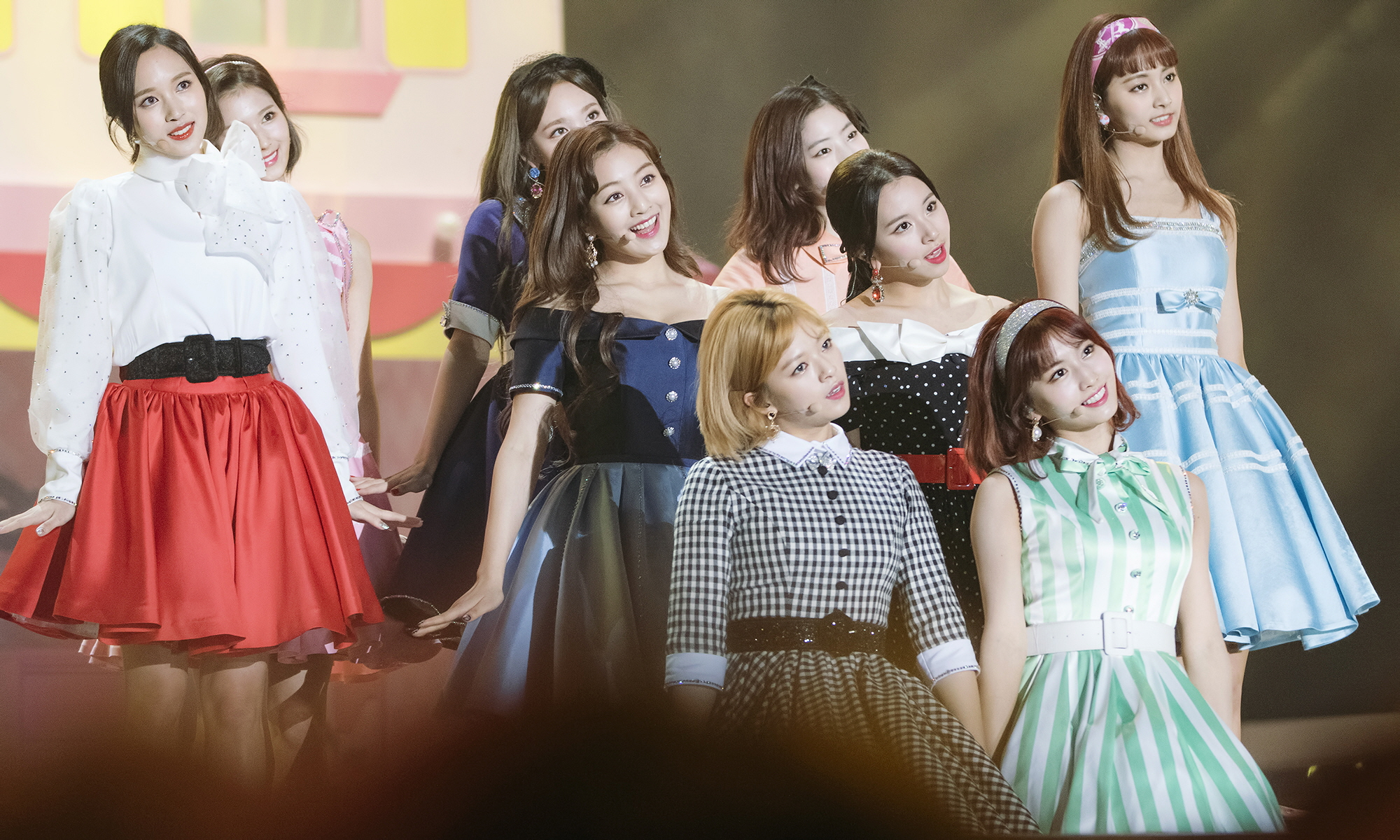
Twice performing "Knock Knock" at 2017 Melon Music Awards in December 2017

On February 20, 2017, Twice had a live broadcast on Naver V Live at 20:00 KST to celebrate their comeback with fans. The group talked about the album, the lead single "Knock Knock" and its music video, as well as their first solo concert which was held on February 17–19 and Asian tour. They also performed the full choreography of "Knock Knock". The next day, Twice recorded their appearance on the February 25 episode of You Hee-yeol's Sketchbook, their first variety show for Twicecoaster: Lane 2. The group's appearance was included in the show's special monthly episodes with the concept "Songs I want to sing for those in their 20s."

On February 23, Twice held their first comeback stage on M Countdown. It was then followed by performances on February 24 to 26 on Music Bank, Show! Music Core and Inkigayo respectively. Promotion continued on the March 7 episode of The Show, and Show Champion on March 8. The group ended their music show promotions on March 12 on Inkigayo.

== Japanese version ==
On February 24, 2017, Twice officially announced that their debut in Japan was set for June 28. They released a compilation album titled #Twice which consists of ten songs including both Korean and Japanese-language versions of "Knock Knock". The Japanese lyrics were written by the same lyricists of the original version.

== Accolades ==
Awards and nominations for "Knock Knock"
Year	Award	Category	Result	Ref.
2017	9th Melon Music Awards	Best Song Award (Song of the Year)	Nominated	
2017	9th Melon Music Awards	Best Dance – Female	Won	
2018	32nd Golden Disc Awards	Digital Daesang (Song of the Year)	Nominated	
2018	32nd Golden Disc Awards	Digital Bonsang	Won	
2018	7th Gaon Chart Music Awards	Artist of the Year – Digital Music (February)	Won	

Music program awards
Program	Date (9 total)	Ref.
M Countdown	March 2, 2017	
M Countdown	March 16, 2017	
Music Bank	March 3, 2017	
Music Bank	March 17, 2017	
Inkigayo	March 5, 2017	
Inkigayo	March 12, 2017	
Inkigayo	March 19, 2017	
The Show	March 7, 2017	
Show Champion	March 8, 2017	

== Charts ==
=== Weekly charts ===
Weekly chart performance
Chart (2017)	Peak position
Japan (Japan Hot 100)	15
Philippines (Philippine Hot 100)	100
South Korea (Gaon)	1
South Korea (Kpop Hot 100)	25
US World Digital Song Sales (Billboard)	5

=== Year-end charts ===
Year-end chart performance
Chart (2017)	Position
Japan (Japan Hot 100)	60
South Korean (Gaon)	8

== Certifications ==
Certifications
Region	Certification	Certified units/sales
Japan (RIAJ)	Gold	50,000,000^{†}
^{†} Streaming-only figures based on certification alone.

== See also ==
- List of Gaon Digital Chart number ones of 2017
