= Twice (Twice album) =

2017 compilation album by Twice

#Twice
- Standard edition cover

Compilation album by Twice
- Released: June 28, 2017
- Studios: JYPE; Kairos Music Group
- Genres: J-pop; Pop
- Length: 34:16
- Languages: Japanese; Korean; English
- Label: Warner Music Japan
- Producer: J.Y. Park "The Asiansoul"

Twice chronology
Signal (2017)	#Twice (2017)	Twicetagram (2017)

Singles from #Twice
- 1. "Signal (Japanese ver)" Released: June 14, 2017; 2. "TT (Japanese ver)" Released: June 28, 2017

#Twice (Hashtag Twice) is the first Japanese compilation album by South Korean girl group Twice. It is a compilation album consisting of both Korean and Japanese-language versions of the group's first five singles. It was released on June 28, 2017, by Warner Music Japan.

The album surpassed 100,000 unit sales within four days of its release, and sold a total of 136,157 physical copies in its first week. It recorded over 200,000 unit sales on the Oricon Albums Chart in less than a month. In less than two months, it sold over 260,000 copies, earning it a Platinum certification from the Recording Industry Association of Japan (RIAJ).

== Background and release ==
In early February 2017, Twice launched their Japanese website and other social media channels. Large photos and ads of Twice were seen on the walls of busy shopping districts and subway stations in Tokyo on February 8. On February 24, they officially announced that their Japanese debut was set for June 28, 2017. It was revealed then that they would release a compilation album titled #Twice which consists of 10 songs including both Korean and Japanese-language versions of "Like Ooh-Ahh", "Cheer Up" and "TT". On the same day, five Japanese morning programs informed viewers of the upcoming debut and featured Twice in an interview.

On May 31, Twice released details of the album, including the track listing. It has three versions: Standard Edition, First Press Limited Edition A (CD and photo book) and Limited Edition B (CD and DVD). On June 7, Warner Music Japan uploaded a short video of Twice recording the Japanese version of "Like Ooh-Ahh" on YouTube. A week later, Twice digitally released "Signal (Japanese ver.)", along with the short version of its music video, as a preview and countdown to album release. #Twice was officially released on June 28. It was also released as a digital download in EP format on various portals, including South Korean music sites distributed by Genie Music, containing the five Japanese-language songs.

== Promotion ==
On June 14, 2017, it was announced that Twice would have a collaboration with Shibuya 109's 109 Summer Sale campaign for 2017 to mark the album release of #Twice. The store hosted pop-up stores called #Twice Pop-up Store and #Twice Gallery at its Tokyo and Osaka branches throughout July. They also launched a promotion campaign with Tokyo Tower. On June 29–30, the letters "TT", which represent the title track, were displayed in bright pink lighting on the Japanese tourist destination.

The group performed "TT (Japanese ver.)" for the first time on a television program on the June 30 episode of Music Station. They were the first South Korean female artist to perform on the show since BoA in December 2015, and the first South Korean girl group since Girls' Generation in June 2012. Twice appeared on the two-hour special episode along with Exile the Second, Kanjani8, Keyakizaka46, Dean Fujioka, Tomoyo Harada and Hey! Say! JUMP.

On July 2, Twice held their two-part debut showcase titled "Touchdown in Japan" in Tokyo Metropolitan Gymnasium, where they performed their first five Japanese songs, "Touchdown" from Page Two, "Jelly Jelly" and "One in a Million" from Twicecoaster: Lane 1 and a medley of their first five Korean singles. It was attended by a total of 15,000 people.

Twice met with more than 10,000 fans through "Hi-Touch", an event where fans can interact with the band members, held at Makuhari Messe in Mihama-ku, Chiba on August 5 and at Intex Osaka in Suminoe-ku, Osaka on August 6.

== Commercial performance ==
#Twice debuted at number 2 on the daily Oricon Albums Chart on June 27, 2017, selling 46,871 physical copies. 100,000 copies were sold within four days of its release, and the album claimed the top spot of the daily chart on its fifth day. The album charted at number 2 on the weekly Oricon Albums Chart, selling 136,157 units, the highest first week album sales among K-pop artists in Japan in the last two years. On Oricon Digital Albums Chart, it debuted at number 1 with 6,295 download count. It also peaked at number 2 on Billboard Japan Hot Albums, recording 137,642 copies sold, and it charted for 25 weeks in 2017.

On July 6, it was reported that over 210,000 copies of #Twice were shipped out within a week since its release. On July 25, the album surpassed 200,000 album sales on the Oricon Albums Chart. In less than two months, the album sold over 260,000 copies and was certified Platinum by the Recording Industry Association of Japan. On December 4, it was announced that #Twice topped Tower Records Japan's 2017 best-selling domestic albums by K-pop artists. The album exceeded 326,400 shipments on February 23, 2018.

As of May 2019, #Twice was the group's most-consumed album in the United States—which accounts for streaming and sales—with 69,000 equivalent album units. According to Billboard's Jeff Benjamin, "This is likely due to the fact it was available on all streaming platforms, like Spotify where the group's full Korean discography was only added in 2018, as one of the few ways for fans to listen to their hit songs, even if in Japanese."

== Track listing ==
#Twice — Standard edition
No.	Title	Lyrics	Music	Arrangement	Length
1.	"Like Ooh-Ahh" (Japanese version)	Black Eyed Pilseung; Sam Lewis; Yhanael	Black Eyed Pilseung; Sam Lewis	Rado	3:35
2.	"Cheer Up" (Japanese version)	Sam Lewis; Yu Shimoji	Black Eyed Pilseung	Rado	3:28
3.	"TT" (Japanese version)	Sam Lewis; Shoko Fujibayashi	Black Eyed Pilseung	Rado	3:34
4.	"Knock Knock" (Japanese version)	Sim Eun-jee; Min Lee "collapsedone"; Mayu Wakisaka	Min Lee "collapsedone"; Mayu Wakisaka	Min Lee "collapsedone"	3:15
5.	"Signal" (Japanese version)	J.Y. Park "The Asiansoul"; Yu Shimoji; Samuelle Soung	J.Y. Park "The Asiansoul"; Kairos	J.Y. Park "The Asiansoul"; Kim Seung-soo; Armadillo; Kairos	3:16
6.	"Like Ooh-Ahh"	Black Eyed Pilseung; Sam Lewis	Black Eyed Pilseung; Lewis	Rado	3:35
7.	"Cheer Up"	Sam Lewis	Black Eyed Pilseung	Rado	3:28
8.	"TT"	Sam Lewis	Black Eyed Pilseung	Rado	3:34
9.	"Knock Knock"	Sim Eun-jee; Min Lee "collapsedone"; Mayu Wakisaka	Min Lee "collapsedone"; Mayu Wakisaka	Min Lee "collapsedone"	3:15
10.	"Signal"	J.Y. Park "The Asiansoul"	J.Y. Park "The Asiansoul"; Kairos	J.Y. Park "The Asiansoul"; Kim Seung-soo; Armadillo; Kairos	3:16
Total length:					34:16

#Twice — Limited edition bonus DVD
No.	Title	Length
1.	"TT" (Japanese version) (Music video)
2.	"Signal" (Japanese version) (Music video)
3.	"Like Ooh-Ahh" (Japanese version) (Making music video)
4.	"#Twice" (Jacket shooting making movie)
5.	"TT" (Japanese version) (Music video making movie)
6.	"Signal" (Japanese version) (Music video making movie)
7.	"Like Ooh-Ahh" (Music video)
8.	"Cheer Up" (Music video)
9.	"TT" (Music video)
10.	"Knock Knock" (Music video)
11.	"Signal" (Music video)

== Personnel ==
Credits adapted from album liner notes.

JYP Entertainment staff

- Song Ji-eun "Shannen" (JYP Entertainment Japan) – executive producer
- Jimmy Jeong (JYP Entertainment) – executive producer
- J. Y. Park "The Asiansoul" – producer, all instruments, keyboards and computer programming (on "Signal (Japanese ver.)" and "Signal")
- Sim Eun-jee – assistant producer
- Min Lee "collapsedone" – assistant producer, all instruments and computer programming (on "Knock Knock (Japanese ver.)" and "Knock Knock")
- Kim Seung-soo – assistant producer, all instruments, keyboards and computer programming (on "Signal (Japanese ver.)" and "Signal")
- Armadillo – assistant producer (JYP Publishing), all instruments, keyboards and computer programming (on "Signal (Japanese ver.)" and "Signal")
- Park Nam-yong (JYP Entertainment) – choreographer
- Kim Hyung-woong (JYP Entertainment) – choreographer
- Yun Hee-soo (JYP Entertainment) – choreographer
- Na Tae-hoon (JYP Entertainment) – choreographer
- Yoo Kwang-yeol (JYP Entertainment) – choreographer
- Kang Da-sol (JYP Entertainment) – choreographer
- Lee Tae-sub (JYP Entertainment) – recording engineer
- Choi Hye-jin (JYP Entertainment) – recording engineer
- Eom Se-hee (JYP Entertainment) – recording engineer
- Lim Hong-jin (JYP Entertainment) – recording engineer
- Jang Han-soo (JYP Entertainment) – recording engineer

Japanese version recording staff

- Goei Ito (Obelisk) – recording director
- Yu-ki Kokubo (Obelisk) – recording director
- Satoshi Sasamoto – Pro Tools operation

Design staff

- Toshiyuki Suzuki (United Lounge Tokyo) – art direction
- Yasuhiro Uaeda (United Lounge Tokyo) – design
- Takaki Kumada – photography
- Valet – jacket photo style director
- Choi Hee-sun (F.Choi) – music video style director
- Lim Ji-hyun (F.Choi) – music video style director
- F.Choi – music video style director
- Lee Jin-young (F.Choi) – assistant stylist
- Ju Young-suk (F.Choi) – assistant stylist
- Heo Su-yeon (F.Choi) – assistant stylist
- Park Nae-joo – hair director
- Kim Se-gyeong – hair director
- Han So-hee – assistant hair director
- Kim Hwa-yeon – assistant hair director
- Won Jung-yo – makeup director
- Choi Su-ji – assistant makeup director
- Jung You-jung – assistant makeup director

Movie staff

- Jimmy (BS Pictures) – music video director ("TT (Japanese ver.)")
- Kim Young-jo (Naive Creative Production) – music video director ("Signal (Japanese ver.)")
- Yoo Seung-woo (Naive Creative Production) – music video director ("Signal (Japanese ver.)")
- Taikou Nakamura – making music video director ("Like Ooh-Ahh (Japanese ver.)")
- Han Gui-taek – jacket shooting making movie director ("#Twice"), music video making movie director ("TT (Japanese ver.)"), music video making movie director ("Signal (Japanese ver.)")
- Yu Yamaguchi (Warner Music Mastering) – DVD authoring

Other personnel

- Rado – all instruments and computer programming (on "Like Ooh-Ahh (Japanese ver.)", "Cheer Up (Japanese ver.)", "TT (Japanese ver.)", "Like Ooh-Ahh", "Cheer Up" and "TT")
- Joe J. Lee "Kairos" – all instruments, keyboards, computer programming and vocal production (on "Signal (Japanese ver.)" and "Signal")
- Hobyn "K.O" Yi – additional engineering and vocal production (on "Signal (Japanese ver.)" and "Signal")
- Jihyo – background vocals (on "Like Ooh-Ahh (Japanese ver.)", "Cheer Up (Japanese ver.)", "TT (Japanese ver.)", "Knock Knock (Japanese ver.)", "Like Ooh-Ahh", "Cheer Up" and "TT")
- Nayeon – background vocals (on "TT (Japanese ver.)", "Knock Knock (Japanese ver.)" and "TT")
- Ikuko Tsutsumi – background vocals (on "Like Ooh-Ahh (Japanese ver.)", "Cheer Up (Japanese ver.)", "TT (Japanese ver.)", "Knock Knock (Japanese ver.)" and "Signal (Japanese ver.)")
- Mayu Wakisaka – background vocals (on "Knock Knock (Japanese ver.)" and "Knock Knock") and vocal recording director (on "Knock Knock (Japanese ver.)")
- Esther Park "Legaci" – background vocals (on "Signal" and "Signal (Japanese ver.)")
- Kim Yong-woon "Goodear" – recording engineer (on "Like Ooh-Ahh" and "Cheer Up") and mixing engineer (on "Knock Knock (Japanese ver.)" and "Knock Knock")
- fabiotheasian – recording engineer and assistant mixing engineer (on "Like Ooh-Ahh")
- Wes Koz – assistant recording engineer (on "Signal (Japanese ver.)" and "Signal")
- Han Chul-kyu – assistant recording engineer (on "Like Ooh-Ahh")
- Jang Hong-seok – assistant recording engineer (on "Cheer Up")
- Park Sang-rok – assistant recording engineer (on "TT")
- Samuel J Lee "Swish" – vocal production (on "Signal (Japanese ver.)" and "Signal")
- Lee Tae-sub – mixing engineer (on "Like Ooh-Ahh (Japanese ver.)", "Cheer Up (Japanese ver.)", "TT (Japanese ver.)", "Like Ooh-Ahh", "Cheer Up" and "TT")
- Choi Hye-jin – assistant mixing engineer (on "Cheer Up (Japanese ver.)", "TT (Japanese ver.)", "Cheer Up" and "TT")
- Tony Maserati – mixing engineer (on "Signal (Japanese ver.)" and "Signal")
- Miles Comaskey – assistant mixing engineer (on "Signal (Japanese ver.)" and "Signal")
- Kwon Nam-woo – mastering engineer (on "Like Ooh-Ahh (Japanese ver.)", "Cheer Up (Japanese ver.)" and "TT (Japanese ver.)")
- Park Jung-un – mastering engineer (on "Knock Knock (Japanese ver.)", "Signal (Japanese ver.)", "Knock Knock" and "Signal")
- Dave Kutch – mastering engineer (on "Like Ooh-Ahh")
- Chris Gehringer – mastering engineer (on "Cheer Up" and "TT")
- Will Quinnell – assistant mastering engineer (on "TT")

=== Locations ===
Recording

- JYPE Studios, Seoul, South Korea
- Kairos Music Group, Los Angeles, California ("Signal (Japanese ver.)" and "Signal")

Mixing

- JYPE Studios, Seoul, South Korea (all songs except "Signal (Japanese ver.)" and "Signal")
- Mirrorball Studios, North Hollywood, California ("Signal (Japanese ver.)" and "Signal")

Mastering

- JFS Mastering, Seoul, South Korea ("Like Ooh-Ahh (Japanese ver.)", "Cheer Up (Japanese ver.)", "TT (Japanese ver.)")
- Sonic Korea, Seoul, South Korea ("Knock Knock (Japanese ver.)" and "Knock Knock")
- Honey Butter, Seoul, South Korea ("Signal (Japanese ver.)" and "Signal")
- The Mastering Palace, New York City, New York ("Like Ooh-Ahh")
- Sterling Sound, New York City, New York ("Cheer Up" and "TT")

== Charts ==
=== Weekly charts ===
Chart (2017)	Peak position
Japan Hot Albums (Billboard)	2
Japanese Albums (Oricon)	2
Japanese Digital Albums (Oricon)	1
New Zealand Heatseekers Albums (RMNZ)	8

=== Year-end charts ===
Chart (2017)	Position
Japan Hot Albums (Billboard)	21
Japanese Albums (Oricon)	15

Chart (2018)	Position
Japan Hot Albums (Billboard)	48
Japanese Albums (Oricon)	90

== Certifications ==
Region	Certification	Certified units/sales
Japan (RIAJ)	Platinum	250,000^{^}
^{^} Shipments figures based on certification alone.

== Release history ==
Release dates and formats for #Twice
Region	Date	Format(s)	Edition	Label	Ref.
Various	June 28, 2017	Digital download; streaming	Standard Edition	Warner Music Japan	
Japan	June 28, 2017	CD	Standard Edition	Warner Music Japan	
Japan	June 28, 2017	CD + Photo Book	Limited Edition A	Warner Music Japan	
Japan	June 28, 2017	CD + DVD	Limited Edition B	Warner Music Japan	
Japan	September 27, 2023	Vinyl	Limited Edition	Warner Music Japan	

== Accolades ==
Year	Award	Category	Result	Ref.
2018	32nd Japan Gold Disc Award	Album of the Year (Asia)	Won	
2018	32nd Japan Gold Disc Award	Best 3 Albums (Asia)	Won	
