= Signal (EP) =

2017 extended play by Twice

- Digital cover

EP by Twice
- Released: May 15, 2017
- Studios: JYPE; Kairos Music Group
- Genres: K-pop; dance
- Length: 19:45
- Languages: Korean; English
- Label: JYP
- Producer: J.Y. Park "The Asiansoul"

Twice chronology
What's Twice? (2017)	Signal (2017)	#Twice (2017)

Singles from Signal
- 1. "Signal" Released: May 15, 2017

Signal is the fourth extended play (EP) by South Korean girl group Twice. The EP was released on May 15, 2017, by JYP Entertainment.

Featuring six tracks incorporating various genres such as pop dance, hip hop, moombahton, and jazz, the EP is supported by the lead single of the same name produced by Park Jin-young, which features the use of a programmed Roland TR-808-style kick and hi-hat. This marks the first time that Twice and Park had collaborated with one another for a song. Several notable producers and songwriters participated in the production of the album, including Twice's members Jihyo and Chaeyoung who wrote the lyrics for the fifth track "Eye Eye Eyes", while the third track "Only You" has lyrics written by former Wonder Girls member Ha:tfelt.

The EP became a commercial success for the group, reaching over 280,000 copies sold by the end of 2017. With its release, Twice reached an accumulated number of over 1 million albums sold since their debut.

== Background and release ==
On March 31, 2017, it was reported that Twice would be releasing their first full-length album before heading to Japan to promote #Twice. However, JYP Entertainment quickly denied the news and stated that nothing was confirmed yet. On April 18, the agency confirmed Twice's upcoming album release, which was slated for May, but did not give an exact date of release. Nine days later, it was reported that the group finished filming the music video for the title track, which was produced by JYPE founder Park Jin-young. This marked the first time that Twice had collaborated with Park since their debut.

On May 1, Twice shared an image teaser through their official SNS channels featuring the nine members wearing school uniform-styled outfits and confirmed the release of their fourth extended play titled Signal on May 15. They also released the schedule of promotion for the album, including the two-day encore concert of Twice 1st Tour: Twiceland – The Opening on June 17–18, which was to be held at the Jamsil Indoor Stadium in Seoul. The next day, it was revealed that the EP has three versions with nine random CD covers.

Individual image teasers of the members, posed with both hands on their heads using letter Y of the American manual alphabet that look like two antennas, were released over the next few days. On May 3, individual teaser photos of Nayeon, Sana, and Dahyun were uploaded, alongside the full track list for the album revealing six songs in total. Twice members Jihyo and Chaeyoung were credited as lyricists for the song "Eye Eye Eyes", while labelmate and former Wonder Girls member Ha:tfelt penned the song "Only You". Later that day, a new set of individual image teasers were released depicting Nayeon, Sana, and Dahyun to have their respective powers of time manipulation, invisibility, and self-duplication. On May 4, individual teaser photos featuring Jeongyeon, Jihyo, and Chaeyoung were uploaded. A second batch of photos was released later in the day depicting the three members to have the powers of time stopping, enhanced vision, and telekinesis, respectively. On May 5, individual teaser images featuring Momo, Mina, and Tzuyu were released, alongside a second set of images depicting them to have the respective powers of enhanced speed, hypnosis, and enhanced strength. On May 6, a second group image teaser was uploaded. On May 7, a third group image teaser depicting an extraterrestrial sci-fi concept was released.

It was then followed by a series of video teasers featuring the nine members, an intro video with an "enigmatic visual palette like a fantasy film" that shows scenes of an alien with big eyes stroking a rabbit in the woods, and a spoiler video of the title track's instrumental. On May 8, a teaser clip featuring Momo, Dahyun, and Tzuyu was uploaded on YouTube. A new, pastel-toned set of individual teaser photos featuring the three members and their powers was also released. On May 9, a second teaser clip featuring Nayeon, Jihyo, and Mina was uploaded, alongside the second set of their individual teaser photos. On May 10, a third teaser clip featuring Jeongyeon, Sana, and Chaeyoung, alongside a short group shot of Twice by the end, was released. Their pastel-toned individual teaser photos were also uploaded on the same day.

On May 11, an intro clip for the group's "Signal" music video was uploaded, featuring an alien character roaming around a forest. On May 12, an audio teaser for the eponymous lead single was released. The first music video teaser of "Signal" was released on May 13. The group then uploaded a highlight medley for the EP on May 14, featuring audio snippets for all of the tracks. The album, along with the music video for the lead single, was officially released on May 15 as a digital download on various music sites while the physical album was released the following day.

== Composition ==
Signal is an EP consisting of six songs incorporating various genres such as dance-pop, hip hop, moombahton, and jazz, among others. The eponymous title track, written and produced by Park Jin-young, alternates between a hip-hop rhythm with a Roland TR-808-style kick and dance-pop mixed with electronic music. Lyrically, it expresses a girl's frustration who keeps sending "signs and signal" to hint her feelings for a guy but is unnoticed.

The second track "Three Times A Day" is an up-tempo track that lyrically portrays the feelings and thoughts of a girl who has grown frustrated due to the indifference of her boyfriend, and sonically features moombahton and reggaetón stylings. "Only You" is a song written by former Wonder Girls member Ha:tfelt, is described as a pop song combined with hip hop. The song "Hold Me Tight" features the usage of synth music and lyrically talks about a girl's sorrow of hoping for a quick confession from her romantic interest who is oblivious to her feelings. "Eye Eye Eyes" describes the feeling of infatuation, and was written by Jihyo and Chaeyoung while featuring an overall upbeat sound which was contrasted by a jazz break in the middle of the track. The album's closing track, "Someone Like Me" is described as a soft pop song featuring the usage of an electric guitar and is said to be a continuation of the song "One In A Million" from the group's previous release, Twicecoaster: Lane 1.

== Promotion ==
JYP Entertainment denied the report about the group's plan to promote the EP for only two weeks due to their Japanese debut in June. Twice's leader Jihyo, who took a break from activities due to a knee injury, re-joined the group for promotions.

Prior to the release of the EP, Twice promoted actively on variety shows. They filmed their first variety show for the EP on April 26, 2017, as guests on I Can See Your Voice. On May 3, 4 and 9, Twice recorded episodes of Weekly Idol, Knowing Bros and Top 3 Chef King, respectively. Twice held a media event at Blue Square Samsung Card Hall in Hannam-dong, Seoul, before the release of the EP. The group also had a comeback showcase with fans two hours after the release, where they performed "Signal" and other songs from their previous albums. The showcase was broadcast live via Naver V Live.

The group promoted their album in several South Korean music programs, starting with their appearance on M Countdown on May 18. This was followed by performances on Music Bank in a special broadcast in celebration of the FIFA U-20 World Cup on May 19, Show! Music Core on May 20, Inkigayo on May 21, and Show Champion on May 24, among other performance dates. Twice ended their music show promotions on Inkigayo on June 4. The title track "Signal" accumulated a total of 12 music show wins.

== Commercial performance ==
Upon its release, Signal sold over 42,000 copies, setting a record for the highest first-day album sales for a Korean girl group album, which was previously held by Twice's own release Twicecoaster: Lane 1 with 30,000 copies sold. In its first week, the EP reached over 114,000 copies sold, with Twice breaking their own record for having the highest girl group first-week album sales which was also previously held by Twicecoaster: Lane 1 with 113,000 copies sold. Signal debuted atop the Gaon Album Chart on its chart issue dated May 14–20, 2017. On May 23, it was reported that the EP had reached over 250,000 shipments, and as a result, Twice had reached an accumulated number of 1.24 million albums sold in the 19 months since their debut. This was not typical for South Korean girl groups, as they usually had inferior album sales compared to boy groups.

The EP and its title track entered both the Billboard World Albums and World Digital Songs charts, ranking at number 3 in both charts. Signal also marked Twice's first appearance on the Billboard Heatseekers Albums chart, charting at number 11 with 1,000 physical copies sold in the US in its chart issue ending June 3. Signal became the second best-selling album on the Gaon Album Chart for the month of May, recording 248,550 physical copies sold. By year-end, the EP was the 14th best-selling album on the Gaon Album Chart, recording 285,294 copies sold.

== Track listing ==
Signal — Standard edition
No.	Title	Lyrics	Music	Arrangement	Length
1.	"Signal"	J.Y. Park "The Asiansoul"	J.Y. Park; Kairos	J.Y. Park; Kim Seung-soo; Armadillo; Kairos	3:17
2.	"Three Times a Day" (하루에 세번; Harue sebeon)	Kim Won; Dia	Kim Won; Dia	Kim Won	3:11
3.	"Only You" (Only 너; Only neo)	Ha:tfelt	David Anthony Eames; Debbie-Jane Blackwell; 72	Eames	3:38
4.	"Hold Me Tight"	Jowul	Jowul; Scott Granger; Brian Judah; Johnny Marnell; Roahn Hylton	Jowul	3:19
5.	"Eye Eye Eyes"	Jihyo; Chaeyoung	Lise Kristin Kvenseth; Erlend Elvesveen; Jo Sverre Sande; Tone Ravnå Bjørnstad; Rune Helmersen; Elizaveta Vassilieva	Kvenseth; Elvesveen; Sande; Bjørnstad; Helmersen; Vassilieva	2:55
6.	"Someone Like Me"	Park Won	Ronny Vidar Svendsen; Anne Judith Stokke Wik; Nermin Harambašić; Moa “Cazzi Opeia” Carlebecker	Svendsen; Wik; Harambašić; Carlebecker	3:25
Total length:					19:54

Signal — Thailand edition bonus DVD
No.	Title	Length
1.	"Signal" (Music video)
2.	"Signal" (Teaser α)
3.	"Signal" (Teaser β)
4.	"Signal" (Teaser γ)
5.	"Signal" (Music video intro)
6.	"Signal" (Music video teaser)
7.	"Signal" (Dance practice video)
8.	"Signal" (Behind film #1)
9.	"Signal" (Behind film #3)
10.	"Signal" (Behind film #5)

== Personnel ==
Credits adapted from album liner notes.

- J. Y. Park "The Asiansoul" – producer, all instruments, keyboards and computer programming (on "Signal")
- Lee Ji-young – direction and coordination (A&R)
- Kim Bo-hyeon – design (A&R), album design and artwork
- Kim Tae-eun - design (A&R), album design and artwork
- Eom Se-hee – recording and mixing engineer
- Im Hong-jin – recording engineer
- Choi Hye-jin – recording and assistant recording engineer
- Kim Yong-woon "goodear" – recording engineer
- Jang Han-soo – assistant recording engineer
- Wes Koz – assistant recording engineer
- Tony Maserati – mixing engineer
- Jeong Jin – mixing engineer
- Lee Tae-seob – mixing engineer
- Jo Joon-seong – mixing engineer
- Miles Comaskey – assistant mixing engineer
- Park Jeong-eon – mastering engineer
- Lee Soo-jin (Agency Prod) – photographer
- Choi Hee-seon – style director
- Im Ji-hyeon – style director
- Park Nae-joo – hair director
- Won Jeong-yo – makeup director
- Yoon Hee-so – choreographer
- Kang Da-sol – choreographer
- T.Z – choreographer
- Rie Hata – choreographer
- Today Art – printing
- Kim Seung-soo – all instruments, keyboards and computer programming (on "Signal")
- Armadillo – all instruments, keyboards and computer programming (on "Signal") and vocal production (on "Only You")
- Joe J. Lee "Kairos" – all instruments, keyboards, computer programming and vocal production (on "Signal")
- Hobyn "K.O" Yi – additional engineering and vocal production (on "Signal")
- Samuel J Lee "Swish" – vocal production (on "Signal")
- Esther Park "Legaci" – background vocals (on "Signal")
- Kim Won – all instruments and computer programming (on "Three Times a Day")
- Kim So-jin – background vocals (on "Three Times a Day")
- David Anthony Eames – all instruments and computer programming (on "Only You")
- Park Soo-min – background vocals (on "Only You")
- Jowul – all instruments, computer programming and background vocals (on "Hold Me Tight") and vocal production (on "Eye Eye Eyes")
- Nayeon – background vocals (on "Hold Me Tight")
- Jihyo – background vocals (on "Hold Me Tight" and "Eye Eye Eyes")
- Erlend Elvesveen – all instruments and computer programming (on "Eye Eye Eyes")
- Tone Ravna Bjørnstad – all instruments and computer programming (on "Eye Eye Eyes")
- Rune Helmersen – all instruments and computer programming (on "Eye Eye Eyes")
- Ronny Vidar Svendsen – all instruments and computer programming (on "Someone Like Me")
- Twice – background vocals (on "Someone Like Me")
- Cazzi Opeia – background vocals (on "Someone Like Me")
- Park Won – vocal production (on "Someone Like Me")
- Kwon Young-chan – vocal production (on "Someone Like Me")

== Charts ==
=== Weekly charts ===
Chart (2017)	Peak position
Japanese Albums (Oricon)	11
South Korean Albums (Gaon)	1
US Heatseekers Albums (Billboard)	11
US World Albums (Billboard)	3

=== Year-end charts ===
Chart (2017)	Position
South Korean Albums (Gaon)	14

Chart (2018)	Position
South Korean Albums (Gaon)	95

== Accolades ==
Year	Award	Category	Result	Ref.
2017	19th Mnet Asian Music Awards	Album of the Year	Nominated	
2018	7th Gaon Chart Music Awards	Artist of the Year – Physical Album (2nd Quarter)	Nominated	

== Release history ==
Release dates and formats for Signal
Region	Date	Format(s)	Edition	Label	Ref.
Various	May 15, 2017	Digital download; streaming	Standard	JYP	
South Korea	May 16, 2017	CD	Standard	JYP	
Thailand	November 24, 2017	CD + DVD	Thailand	JYP; BEC-Tero Music	
