= TT (song) =

2016 single by Twice

Single by Twice

from the EP Twicecoaster: Lane 1
- Language: Korean
- Released: October 24, 2016
- Genre: K-pop; electropop; dance-pop
- Length: 3:34
- Label: JYP
- Composer: Black Eyed Pilseung
- Lyricist: Sam Lewis
- Producer: Rado

Twice singles chronology
"Cheer Up" (2016)	"TT" (2016)	"Knock Knock" (2017)

Music video
- "TT" on YouTube "TT" (Japanese version) on YouTube

"TT" is a song recorded by South Korean girl group Twice. The song was released by JYP Entertainment on October 24, 2016, as the lead single from their third extended play Twicecoaster: Lane 1. It was written and composed by Sam Lewis and Black Eyed Pilseung respectively. The title "TT" refers to an emoticon used to express crying or sadness.

The Japanese version of "TT" was released as the lead single from the group's first Japanese compilation album, #Twice. Its accompanying music video was released on June 21, 2017.

== Background and release ==
On October 10, 2016, JYP Entertainment announced that Twice would release their third EP Twicecoaster: Lane 1. The first teaser for the music video for "TT" was unveiled on October 20, featuring a boy and a girl wearing Halloween costumes, followed by the second teaser next day. It was released on October 24 as a digital download on various music sites. A remix version titled "TT (TAK Remix)" was released on February 20, 2017, as a bonus track from Twice's special album Twicecoaster: Lane 2.

A few weeks after the release, "TT pose", which is part of the choreography of "TT", became a trend in Japan. It was imitated by several Japanese celebrities on SNS and became popular among teenagers. On February 24, 2017, Twice officially announced that their debut in Japan was set for June 28. They released a compilation album titled #Twice which consists of ten songs including both Korean and Japanese-language versions of "TT". It has Japanese lyrics written by Shoko Fujibayashi.

== Composition ==
"TT"
"TT" is an electropop and dance-pop song set to a steady deep house beat.

"TT" was composed by Black Eyed Pilseung, who is also the composer of Twice's hit songs "Like Ooh-Ahh" and "Cheer Up", and arranged by Rado. It has lyrics written by Sam Lewis, which describes a girl's pounding heart as she falls in love for the first time. It is a K-pop song with heavy electronic influences and steady deep house snare beats. Of the song, Twice member Jihyo said "We've got a song that best shows Twice's energetic, bright vibe that we've shown since 'Like Ooh-Ahh' and 'Cheer Up'".

== Music video ==
The music video for "TT" was directed by Kim Young-jo and Yoo Seung-woo of Naive, the same production team behind the music videos for Twice's songs "Like Ooh-Ahh" and "Cheer Up". It earned more than 5 million views on YouTube in less than 24 hours since its release. As of 2016, the video set a new record in only 40 hours, making it the fastest K-pop group music video to reach 10 million views and then broke the record of fastest to reach 20 million views in 114 hours (4 days 18 hours). The music video also ranked third place on 2016 YouTube's Most Popular Music Video in South Korea, while "Cheer Up" topped the list.

In early 2017, the music video for "TT" hit 100 million views and became the most viewed K-pop girl group music video of all time. It also recorded the first K-pop female act and the fastest idol group to achieve 200 million and 300 million YouTube views. In September 2018, the music video became the first by a K-pop female act to hit 400 million views on YouTube.

In the music video, the members showcased different personalities and famous characters through Halloween-themed cosplays: Jeongyeon and Momo portray Pinocchio and Tinker Bell respectively; Dahyun is the White Rabbit from Alice's Adventures in Wonderland while Sana is Hit-Girl of Kick-Ass comic series. Chaeyoung is Ariel from The Little Mermaid and Nayeon is a cute devil. Mina is a female pirate reminiscent of Pirates of the Caribbean. Tzuyu and Jihyo have contrasting concepts; Tzuyu is a mysterious vampire in a black see-through dress while Jihyo is a mix of Elsa from Frozen and the White Queen from Alice Through the Looking-Glass—wearing a long white dress. The video ends with a "To be continued" message, hinting to the album's sequential nature. The sound the music video ends with is the beginning of their following single, "Knock Knock", which continues with the plot shown in "TT" by solving the mystery of who was knocking at the door.

The full music video of the Japanese version of "TT", directed by Jimmy of BS Pictures, was released on June 21, 2017. It ranked at No. 4 of YouTube Japan Top Trend Music Video in 2017.

== Critical reception ==
Billboard included "TT" in their best K-pop songs of the 2010s list, writing that "the decade-defining girl group solidified their legacy with this gooey synth-pop track that created a new go-to phrase for K-pop fans worldwide. The song boasts an earworm for anyone and everyone's taste."

"TT" on critics' lists
Publication	Accolade	Rank	Ref.
Billboard	The 100 Greatest K-Pop Songs of the 2010s	18	
Medium	25 Best K-Pop Songs of the 2010s	20	
Melon	Top 100 K-pop Songs of All Time	56	
Rolling Stone	100 Greatest Songs in the History of Korean Pop Music	15	

== Accolades ==
Awards and nominations
Year	Award	Category	Result	Ref.
2017	Gaon Chart Music Awards	Artist of the Year – Digital Music (October)	Won	
2018	Japan Gold Disc Award	Song of the Year by Download – Asia (Note: Award received by "TT (Japanese ver.)")	Won	
2020	Bugs Music Awards	20th Anniversary – Most Loved Music	Won	

Music program awards (13 total)
Program	Date	Ref.
The Show	November 1, 2016	
Show Champion	November 2, 2016	
M Countdown	November 3, 2016	
M Countdown	November 10, 2016	
Music Bank	November 4, 2016	
Music Bank	November 11, 2016	
Music Bank	November 18, 2016	
Music Bank	November 25, 2016	
Music Bank	December 2, 2016	
Music Bank	January 6, 2017	
Inkigayo	November 6, 2016	
Inkigayo	November 13, 2016	
Inkigayo	November 20, 2016	

== Commercial performance ==
"TT" became one of the best-performing songs in 2016, as it claimed the top spot of Gaon's Digital Chart for four consecutive weeks. It also peaked at number two and three on Billboard charts' World Digital Song Sales and Billboard Japan Hot 100, respectively. "TT" surpassed 100 million streams in April 2017 and 2,500,000 downloads in July 2018 on Gaon Music Chart. It placed at No. 6 on the 2017 Year-end Billboard Japan Hot 100 list, the only Korean song on the ranking. It is also Twice's best selling song in the United States with 33,000 copies sold as of May 2019.

In February 2018, "TT (Japanese ver.)" earned Gold digital certification for over 100,000 downloads, marking the group's first digital single certification from the Recording Industry Association of Japan (RIAJ). In April 2020, the RIAJ introduced streaming certifications, and the single was certified Silver for upwards of 30 million known streams. Both the Korean and Japanese versions of "TT" were subsequently certified Gold for surpassing 50 million streams.

== Charts ==
=== Weekly charts ===
Weekly chart performance
Chart (2016–2018)	Peak position
Japan (Japan Hot 100)	3
Japan Digital Singles (Oricon)	17 (Note: Peak chart position of "TT (Japanese ver.)" on Oricon Digital Singles Chart.)
Philippines (Philippines Hot 100)	54
South Korea (Gaon)	1
South Korea (Kpop Hot 100)	36
US World Digital Song Sales (Billboard)	2

=== Year-end charts ===
2016 year-end chart performance for "TT"
Chart (2016)	Position
South Korea (Gaon)	26

2017 year-end chart performance for "TT"
Chart (2017)	Position
Japan (Japan Hot 100)	6
South Korean (Gaon)	40

2018 year-end chart performance for "TT"
Chart (2018)	Position
Japan (Japan Hot 100)	19

== Certifications and sales ==
Certifications and sales
Region	Certification	Certified units/sales
Japan (RIAJ) Japanese ver.	Gold	100,000^{*}
South Korea	—	2,500,000
Streaming
Japan (RIAJ)	Gold	50,000,000^{†}
Japan (RIAJ) Japanese ver.	Platinum	100,000,000^{†}
South Korea	—	100,000,000
^{*} Sales figures based on certification alone.^{†} Streaming-only figures based on certification alone.

== See also ==
- List of Gaon Digital Chart number ones of 2016
