= Twicecoaster: Lane 1 =

2016 extended play by Twice

- Digital and Neon Magenta version cover

EP by Twice
- Released: October 24, 2016
- Studios: JYPE; Prelude; Trinity Sound; Paradise Music; U Productions; Kairos Music Group
- Genres: K-pop; dance
- Length: 22:48
- Languages: Korean; English
- Label: JYP
- Producer: J.Y. Park "The Asiansoul"

Twice chronology
Page Two (2016)	Twicecoaster: Lane 1 (2016)	Twicecoaster: Lane 2 (2017)

Singles from Twicecoaster: Lane 1
- 1. "TT" Released: October 24, 2016

Twicecoaster: Lane 1 is the third extended play (EP) by South Korean girl group Twice. The EP was released on October 24, 2016, by JYP Entertainment.

Consisting of seven tracks which features various genres including electropop, dance-pop, deep house, R&B, and rock, the EP is supported by the lead single "TT", produced by Black Eyed Pilseung. It was a commercial success for the group, topping the Gaon Album Chart and surpassing the five-month sales of their previous EP release Page Two in one week. It then became the highest-selling Korean girl group album on Gaon for the year 2016, selling over 350,000 copies. A Christmas edition of the album was also released on December 19, 2016.

The reissue of the EP, titled Twicecoaster: Lane 2, was released on February 20, 2017.

== Background and release ==
On October 10, 2016, JYP Entertainment first confirmed details about Twice's upcoming EP, titled Twicecoaster: Lane 1, by releasing a promotion time table through the group's official homepage and SNS accounts, showing their promotion schedule beginning October 10 until the release of their album which was slated on October 24. On October 11, Twice uploaded an intro video which depicts the group returning to their dressing rooms following a performance of their previous single "Cheer Up", before each member received a text message which leads to them frowning and making a pose forming the word "TT". On October 12, the group released an album preview revealing its contents and packaging. On October 13, Twice uploaded an image of the album's track list, revealing its lead single to be "TT" and featuring seven songs in total. An image titled "Twice MV Universe" was also released on the same day, suggesting that the in-universe events of the upcoming music video for "TT" would be connected to the music videos of Twice's previous singles "Like Ooh-Ahh" and "Cheer Up".

Twice uploaded their first group teaser photo on October 14. A second group photo was uploaded later on the same day depicting the members sitting on chairs which are arranged similarly to that of a roller coaster. On October 15, two group teaser images featuring Jeongyeon, Mina, Nayeon, and Momo were released. On the same day, the group released a second album preview revealing that two versions of the album: apricot and neon magenta, are available. The two available versions for the album are references to Twice's official colors which they announced earlier in September. On October 16, two group teaser images featuring Jihyo, Tzuyu, Sana, Chaeyoung, and Dahyun were released. On the same day, members Mina and Chaeyoung made an appearance on the 2016 KBO League held at the Jamsil Baseball Stadium in order to throw the ceremonial first pitch for the match between Nexen Heroes and LG Twins, wherein they showed the "TT" pose, attracting attention. On October 17, three individual teaser films featuring Nayeon, Jeongyeon, and Momo were released, which depicts each member encountering their own disappointing situations which leads to them forming the "TT" pose. This was followed by the teaser films featuring Sana, Jihyo, and Mina released on October 18. On October 19, the last batch of individual teaser films featuring Dahyun, Chaeyoung, and Tzuyu were uploaded.

In celebration of Twice's first anniversary since debut, the group unveiled the EP's seventh track "One in a Million", the song they dedicated to fans, through a live broadcast on Naver V Live titled Twice 1st Anniversary V on October 20 at 22:30 KST. On the same day, they uploaded the first music video teaser for "TT", depicting a Halloween-themed concept and featuring two children entering and exploring a gloomy mansion for trick-or-treat. This was followed by a second teaser clip uploaded on October 21, which featured the members greeting the children while also revealing a part of the song's opening verse and its choreography. On October 22, the group released pastel-toned individual teaser photos for each member. It was also revealed that the physical album has nine random CD covers featuring the each member of the group. The following day, Twice released a highlight medley featuring audio snippets for all the songs in the EP alongside a series of choreography teasers which illustrate the dance moves of each member, for "TT", in characterized diagrams.

The album was officially released on October 24 at 12AM KST. It was also released as a digital download on various music portals.

== Composition ==
Twicecoaster: Lane 1 is an EP consisting of seven tracks that features various genres including electropop, dance-pop, deep house, R&B, and rock, among others. The lead single "TT" is produced by South Korean producing duo Black Eyed Pilseung, who also worked with Twice for their previous singles "Like Ooh-Ahh" and "Cheer Up". It is sonically described as an electropop and dance-pop song set to a steady deep house beat. With its title referring to the emoticon used to express crying or sadness, the song lyrically describes a girl's pounding heart as she falls in love for the first time. Speaking about the song, member Jihyo stated that the track "best shows Twice's energetic, bright vibe that [they've] shown since 'Like Ooh-Ahh' and 'Cheer Up'".

The song "1 to 10" is classified as an R&B track reminiscent of songs released during the 1990s, featuring the usage of synth music mixed with heavy drums, bass, and acoustic guitar. "Ponytail" heavily features the usage of rock. "Jelly Jelly" is described as a pop song which mixes Moog bass and synth music. "Pit-A-Pat" is classified as an energetic fusion pop dance song that lyrically talks about the excitement of a girl. "Next Page" is described as an upbeat song with an urban atmosphere. The title of the album's closing track, "One in a Million", refers to the group's signature introductory greeting and was written for fans, with the acoustic track lyrically describing its listeners as a special "one in a million" person.

== Promotion ==
Upon the release of the EP, Twice held a showcase at the Blue Square in Seoul, South Korea. They performed songs from their previous albums: "Like Ooh-Ahh", "Do It Again", "Precious Love", "Cheer Up" and "Candy Boy". They also performed "One in a Million", "Jelly Jelly" and "TT" for the first time at the showcase, which was broadcast live through Naver V Live.

The group then promoted the EP by performing "TT" and "1 to 10" on several South Korean music programs, starting with their appearance on M Countdown on October 27 in its special broadcast episode held in Jeju Island. The episode held in Jeju gathered 10,000 local and international fans and was broadcast in thirteen countries. This was followed by performances on Music Bank on October 28, Show! Music Core on October 29, The Show on November 1 (wherein "TT" received its first music show win), and Show Champion on November 2, among other performance dates. Twice performed "Jelly Jelly" for the first time in a music program on the November 27 episode of Inkigayo. The EP's lead single went on to garner an accumulated 13 music show wins, with its last win being on Music Bank in its episode aired on January 6, 2017.

== Commercial performance ==
On October 31, it was reported that the EP recorded more than 165,000 physical copies sold on the Gaon Album Chart within a week, recording the highest sales for a Korean girl group album for the year 2016. With this, the group surpassed the five-month sales of their previous EP release Page Two in only seven days. The album also debuted atop the weekly Gaon Album Chart, and entered the Billboard World Albums chart at number 3 in its chart issue dated November 12.

Twicecoaster: Lane 1 then became the third best selling album on the Gaon Album Chart for the month of October, recording 166,810 copies sold. On November 22, it was reported that the EP had surpassed 200,000 physical sales, making Twice the only K-pop girl group who had sold over 200,000 album copies throughout 2014 to 2016. By the end of the year, the album became the fifth best-selling album release and the best-selling Korean girl group album for 2016, recording 350,852 copies sold. The EP held the record of having both the highest first-day and first-week sales for a Korean girl group album until it was surpassed by Twice's succeeding release Signal in 2017.

== Christmas edition ==
On December 5, 2016, Twice first announced through their official SNS channels that they would be releasing a Christmas edition of Twicecoaster: Lane 1, which is a version wherein the album's jacket photos are changed to that of Twice wearing holiday outfits but having the same track listing as the original release. Pre-orders were scheduled on December 12 and the album release was slated for December 19. On December 7, the group released two group teaser photos of the members wearing Christmas attire. Upon its release on December 19, the Christmas edition sold over 115,000 copies in pre-orders.

== Track listing ==
Twicecoaster: Lane 1 — Standard edition
No.	Title	Lyrics	Music	Arrangement	Length
1.	"TT"	Sam Lewis	Black Eyed Pilseung	Rado	3:34
2.	"1 to 10"	Chloe; Noday	Noday; Chloe	Noday; Chloe	2:56
3.	"Ponytail"	Lee Sin-seong; ZigZag Note	ZigZag Note	ZigZag Note; Noh Eun-jong	3:27
4.	"Jelly Jelly"	Jowul	east4A; Ashley Mounts; Kim Hee-deok	east4A	3:32
5.	"Pit-A-Pat"	Yorkie; Kang Ji-won	Kang Ji-won; Im Kwang-uk	Im Kwang-uk; Kang Ji-won	3:27
6.	"Next Page"	Maeel	Joe J. Lee "Kairos"	Joe J. Lee "Kairos"; Hobyn "K.O" Yi	2:57
7.	"One in a Million"	mr.cho	Sebastian Thott; Didrik Thott; Andreas Öberg; Danielle Senior	Sebastian Thott	2:55
Total length:					22:48

Twicecoaster: Lane 1 — Thailand edition bonus DVD
No.	Title	Length
1.	"TT" (Music Video)
2.	"TT" (Music Video Teaser 1)
3.	"TT" (Music Video Teaser 2)
4.	"TT" (Dance Practice Video)
5.	"1 to 10" (Dance Practice Video)
6.	"Jelly Jelly" (Dance Practice Video)
7.	"TT" (Jacket Behind (Thai Subtitle))
8.	"TT" (Behind (Thai Subtitle))

== Content production ==
Credits adapted from album liner notes

=== Locations ===
Recording

- JYPE Studios, Seoul, South Korea
- Prelude Studio, Seoul, South Korea
- Trinity Sound Studio, Seoul, South Korea
- Paradise Music Studio, Seoul, South Korea
- U Productions Studio A, Seoul, South Korea
- Kairos Music Group, Los Angeles, California

Mixing

- JYPE Studios, Seoul, South Korea
- W Sound Studio, Seoul, South Korea
- Echo Bar Studios, Los Angeles, California

Mastering

- Sonic Korea, Seoul, South Korea

=== Personnel ===
- J. Y. Park "The Asiansoul" – producer
- Black Eyed Pilseung – co-producer
- Lee Ji-young – direction and coordination (A&R)
- Jang Ha-na – music (A&R)
- Nam Jeong-min – music (A&R)
- Kim Ji-hyeong – production (A&R)
- Kim Bo-hyeon – design (A&R), album design and artwork
- Kim Tae-eun – design (A&R), album design and artwork
- Choi Hye-jin – recording and assistant mixing engineer
- Im Hong-jin – recording engineer
- Lee Chang-seon – recording engineer
- Kim Si-cheol – recording engineer
- Yang Jeong-nam – recording engineer
- Brian U – recording engineer
- Kang Yeon-noo – recording engineer
- Wes Koz – assistant recording engineer and acoustic guitar (on "Next Page")
- Kevin Wong "Koncept" – assistant recording engineer
- Park Sang-rok – assistant recording engineer
- Lee Tae-seob – mixing engineer
- Kim Yong-woon "goodear" – mixing engineer
- Jo Joon-seong – mixing engineer
- Bob Horn – mixing engineer
- Choi Ja-yeon – assistant mixing engineer
- Park Jeong-eon – mastering engineer
- Kim Young-jo (Naive Creative Production) – music video director
- Yoo Seung-woo (Naive Creative Production) – music video director
- Kim Young-joon (Agency Seed) – photographer
- Choi Hee-seon – stylist
- Im Ji-hyeon – stylist
- Park Nae-joo – hair director
- Won Jeong-yo – makeup director
- Park Nam-yong – choreographer
- Yoon Hee-so – choreographer
- Lia Kim – choreographer
- Jiggy Choi Young-joon – choreographer
- Hong Hoon-pyo – choreographer
- Rado – all instruments and computer programming (on "TT")
- Jihyo – background vocals (on "TT")
- Nayeon – background vocals (on "TT")
- Noday – all instruments, keyboard and computer programming (on "1 to 10")
- Chloe – all instruments, keyboard, computer programming and background vocals (on "1 to 10")
- Kwon Phillip – guitar (on "1 to 10")
- Yoon Woo-seon – piano (on "Ponytail")
- Kim Ki-wook – bass (on "Ponytail")
- Hong Joon-ho – guitar (on "Ponytail")
- Lee Gyu-hyeong – drum (on "Ponytail")
- Lee Dae-hee – synthesizer (on "Ponytail")
- Kim So-hyeon – chorus (on "Ponytail") and background vocals (on "Pit-a-Pat")
- east4A – all instruments and computer programming (on "Jelly Jelly")
- Jeong Jin-ha – background vocals (on "Jelly Jelly")
- Im Kwang-wook – all instruments and computer programming (on "Pit-a-Pat")
- Kang Ji-won – all instruments and computer programming (on "Pit-a-Pat")
- Joe J. Lee "Kairos" – all instruments and vocal production (on "Next Page")
- Hobyn "K.O" Yi – all instruments, keyboards, computer programming and vocal production (on "Next Page")
- Samuel J Lee – bass and vocal production (on "Next Page")
- Esther Park "Legaci" – background vocals and vocal production (on "Next Page")
- Bei Zhang – background vocals (on "Next Page")
- Sebastian Thott – all instruments, computer programming and guitars (on "One in a Million")
- Andreas Öberg – guitars (on "One in a Million")
- Lee Da-jeong – background vocals (on "One in a Million")

== Charts ==
=== Weekly charts ===
Chart (2016)	Peak position
Japanese Albums (Oricon)	10
Japanese Hot Albums (Billboard)	74
South Korean Albums (Gaon)	1
US World Albums (Billboard)	3

=== Year-end charts ===
Chart (2016)	Position
South Korean Albums (Gaon)	5

Chart (2017)	Position
Japanese Albums (Oricon)	96
South Korean Albums (Gaon)	84

== Accolades ==
Year	Award	Category	Result	Ref.
2017	31st Golden Disc Awards	Album Daesang (Album of the Year)	Nominated	

== Release history ==
Release dates and formats for Twicecoaster: Lane 1
Region	Date	Format(s)	Edition	Label	Ref.
Various	October 24, 2016	Digital download; streaming	Standard	JYP	
South Korea	October 24, 2016	CD	Standard	JYP	
South Korea	December 19, 2016	CD	Christmas	JYP	
Thailand	March 17, 2017	CD + DVD	Thailand	JYP; BEC-Tero Music	
