= Page Two (EP) =

2016 extended play by Twice

- Digital and Mint version cover

EP by Twice
- Released: April 25, 2016
- Studio: JYPE Studios
- Genres: K-pop; dance
- Length: 23:51
- Languages: Korean; English
- Label: JYP
- Producer: J.Y. Park "The Asiansoul"

Twice chronology
The Story Begins (2015)	Page Two (2016)	Twicecoaster: Lane 1 (2016)

Alternative cover
- Limited edition cover featuring artwork by Chaeyoung

Singles from Page Two
- 1. "Cheer Up" Released: April 25, 2016

Page Two is the second extended play (EP) by South Korean girl group Twice. The album was released on April 25, 2016, by JYP Entertainment. It is supported by the lead single, "Cheer Up", which was produced by South Korean producing duo Black Eyed Pilseung.

Consisting of seven tracks in total which incorporates various genres including dance-pop and hip hop, the EP became a commercial success for the group, reaching over 150,000 copies sold by September 2016. It set a record for having the highest first-week sales out of all Korean girl group album releases in 2016, until it was surpassed by Twice's succeeding EP Twicecoaster: Lane 1, which was released six months later.

== Background and release ==
On April 5, 2016, Twice released a group teaser image depicting the members wearing cheerleading outfits in an empty stadium on their official SNS accounts, revealing that their comeback was slated for April 25 with the word "#CheerUp" included in the image. JYP Entertainment announced that the group's comeback will "show an even more lively side of Twice" and further added that they will begin promotional activities for the upcoming album in the following week.

On April 12, the group confirmed that their next release will be an EP titled Page Two, and released an image of the album's track list, revealing seven songs in total with the lead single "Cheer Up". The seventh track "I'm Gonna Be a Star", which served as the theme song for Sixteen, was announced to be included only in the physical copy of the album. Contents of the physical album (which comes in two versions: pink and mint) was also revealed, and it was announced that 30,000 limited edition copies featuring a special sleeve designed by member Chaeyoung was available.

On April 18, the group released their first music video teaser for "Cheer Up", which ranked first in real-time Korean search engines. They also uploaded a group teaser image on the same day. On April 19, a second music video teaser clip which featured Nayeon, Momo, and Dahyun was uploaded. Two sets of individual teaser photos featuring the three members were also released later that day. On April 20, a third music video teaser clip featuring Jeongyeon, Jihyo, and Mina was released, alongside the two batches of their individual teaser photos. The fourth music video teaser clip which featured Sana, Chaeyoung, and Tzuyu was uploaded on April 21, along with the two batches of their individual teaser photos. On April 22, the group released a music video teaser clip featuring all the members, revealing a snippet of the lead single's audio. The following day, they released another music video teaser which revealed a part of the choreography for "Cheer Up". An additional group teaser image was also released. On April 24, Twice released an album highlight medley featuring audio snippets for all tracks from the EP. They also released the online cover image for the album on the same day. Page Two was officially released on April 25 on various Korean music portals.

== Composition ==
The extended play's lead single, "Cheer Up", has lyrics written by Sam Lewis and music by Black Eyed Pilseung, the same team who wrote Twice's hit single "Like Ooh-Ahh" from their debut EP The Story Begins. "Cheer Up" is a dance-pop song that incorporates multiple genres, including hip hop, tropical house, and drum and bass; this blend was described as "color pop". The second track on the album is a remake of Park Ji-yoon's 1998 single, "Precious Love", written by Park Jin-young (J. Y. Park). The song was re-arranged in a house dance style with electronic instrumentation and hip hop rhythms, and features a new rap written by Chaeyoung.

"Touchdown" was described as a "powerful dance number with dynamic rhythms, melodies, and powerful sound effects". "Tuk Tok" is a dance-pop song with elements of soul and trap, inspired by the teaser video for Sixteen. "Woohoo" was described as a hip hop song with "groovy beats", and "My Headphones On" is a pop ballad about a girl's breakup. A seventh track, "I'm Gonna Be a Star" (the theme song from Sixteen) is only available on the CD version of the album.

== Promotion ==
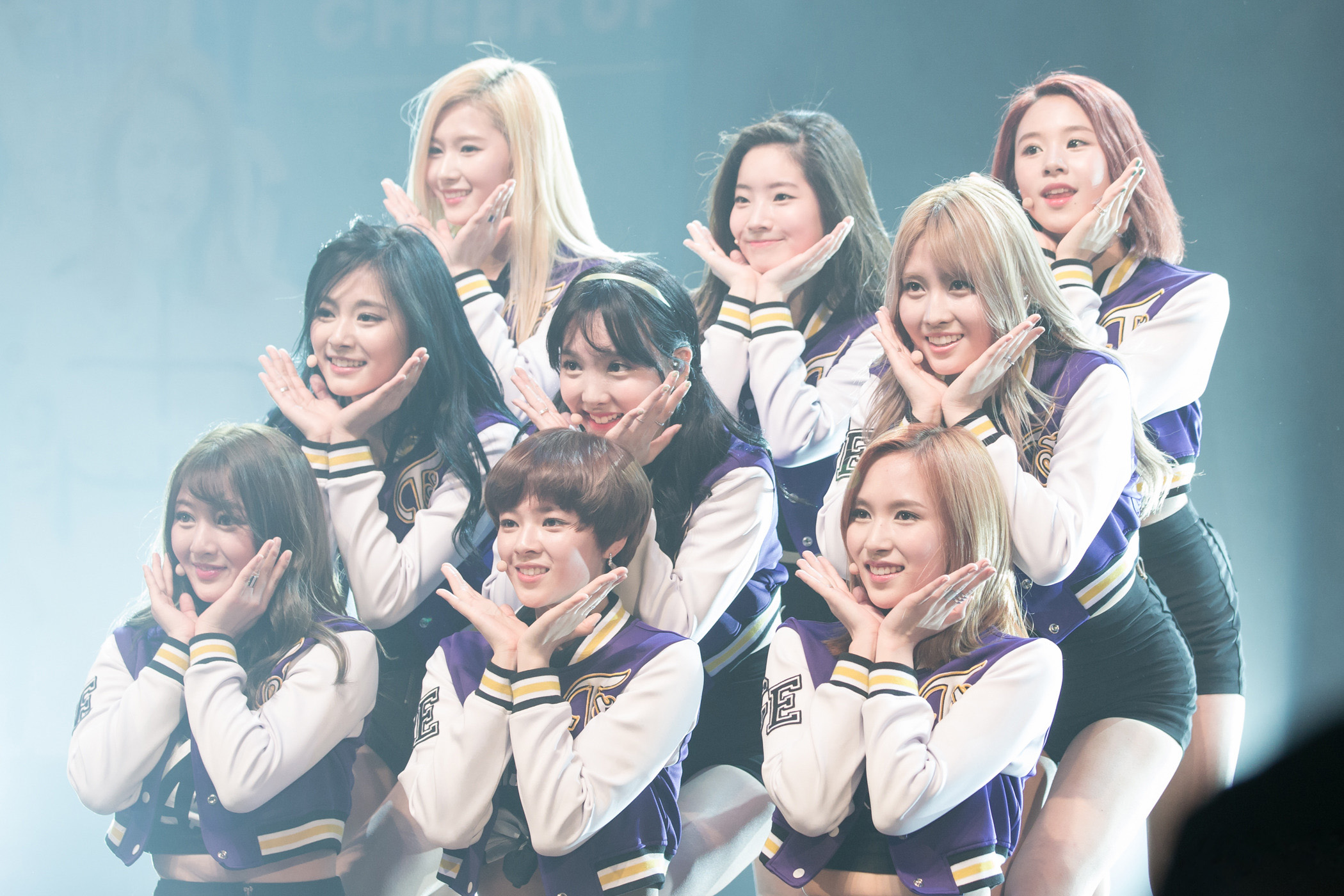
Twice performing "Cheer Up" at the fan showcase on April 25, 2016.

At 2pm KST on April 25, 2016, Twice held a media showcase at Yes 24 Live Hall in Gwangjin-gu, Seoul. They held a showcase for fans at the same location at 8pm, and it was also broadcast live via Naver's V Live. They performed "Woohoo", "Touchdown", "Precious Love" and "Cheer Up" for the first time at the showcase. The group then promoted the album with a series of televised live performances on various music shows. Their first music show appearance was on M! Countdown on April 28, where they performed "Cheer Up" and "Touchdown". The choreography for "Cheer Up" was slightly changed after Sana's "shy shy shy" line (pronounced "sha sha sha") became a viral meme. Twice won their first music show award on M! Countdown the following week on May 5, and also won on Music Bank and Inkigayo that same week. They concluded promotion for the album on May 29 with a performance on Inkigayo, winning a total of eleven music show awards. The trophy on the May 27 edition of Music Bank was initially awarded to AOA before the show's producers admitted they had miscalculated the album points. On June 9, Twice returned to music shows for one week, performing "I'm Gonna Be a Star" without Jeongyeon, who had injured her leg while filming for Law of the Jungle.

== Critical reception ==
Kim Hyang-min of Korea JoongAng Daily gave the album a mixed review, describing the songs as "high-spirited and cheerful" and "generally refreshing and witty" but regretting the album's lack of genre diversity. Kim noted that the tension in the lead single's lyrics was "well-expressed" through its hip-hop and electronic sounds, though the song was too repetitive, and praised "Touchdown" for its "powerful sound" and energetic feeling.

== Commercial performance ==
Page Two recorded the highest first-week sales volume for a Korean girl group in 2016 after reaching over 41,800 copies sold, which would soon be surpassed by Twice's own succeeding release Twicecoaster: Lane 1 released in October. The EP debuted at number two on the Gaon Album Chart and number six on the Billboard World Albums chart, with 80,686 units sold during the month of April. According to JYPE representatives, the pre-order of 30,000 limited edition albums was sold out before its official release. By September, the album had sold over 150,000 units.

The songs from the album also performed well digitally. "Cheer Up" charted at number one on the Gaon Digital Chart and number three on the Billboard World Digital Song Sales chart, and was the best-performing song of 2016 in South Korea. "Precious Love" and "Touchdown" also charted on the Gaon Digital Chart, at numbers 73 and 86 respectively.

== Track listing ==
Page Two — Digital EP
No.	Title	Lyrics	Music	Arrangement	Length
1.	"Cheer Up"	Sam Lewis	Black Eyed Pilseung	Rado	3:28
2.	"Precious Love" (소중한 사랑; Sojunghan sarang)	J. Y. Park "The Asiansoul"; Chaeyoung	Park	Hong Ji-sang	3:51
3.	"Touchdown"	Mafly	Krissie Karlsson; Karl Karlsson; Nicki Karlsson; EJ Show (Zoobeater Sound)	The Karlsson's; EJ Show	3:23
4.	"Tuk Tok" (툭하면 톡; Tukhamyeon tok)	Kim Min-ji (Jam Factory)	Choi Jin-suk; Ronald "AV" Ndlovu; Emmanuel Jimenez; Courtney Jenaé Stahl; Stacy Hebert	Choi	3:17
5.	"Woohoo"	Glory Face (Note: Glory Face (Korean: 영광의얼굴들; RR: Yeonggwanguieolguldeul) is a songwriting team made up of Jang Jun-ho and Gong Hyeon-sik, under Duble Kick Entertainment); Jinli	Glory Face	Glory Face	3:22
6.	"My Headphones On" (Headphone 써; Headphone sseo)	Kim Eun-soo	Didrik Thott; Niclas Kings; Ylva Dimberg	Kings	3:17
Total length:					20:37

Page Two — Physical EP bonus track
No.	Title	Lyrics	Music	Arrangement	Length
7.	"I'm Gonna Be a Star"	Park; Olltii	Park; Frants; The Vanderveers (Ebony Rae Vanderveer and Bruce "Automatic" Vanderveer)	Park; Frants	3:18
Total length:					23:55

Page Two — Thailand edition bonus DVD
No.	Title	Length
1.	"Cheer Up" (Music Video)
2.	"Cheer Up" (Teaser 1)
3.	"Cheer Up" (Teaser 2)
4.	"Cheer Up" (Teaser 3)
5.	"Cheer Up" (Teaser 4)
6.	"Cheer Up" (Music Video Teaser 1)
7.	"Cheer Up" (Music Video Teaser 2)
8.	"Special Interview" (Special Interview for Thai fans)

== Content production ==
Credits adapted from album liner notes.

Locations

- Recorded, engineered and mixed at JYP Entertainment Studios, Seoul, South Korea
- Mastered at Suono Mastering, Seoul, South Korea

Personnel

- J. Y. Park – producer, all instruments (on "I'm Gonna Be a Star")
- Black Eyed Pilseung – co-producer
- Kim Yong-woon "goodyear" – recording and mixing engineer
- Choi Hye-jin – recording engineer, assistant mixing engineer
- Jang Hong-seok – assistant recording engineer
- Lee Tae-seop – mixing engineer
- Choi Hong-young – mastering engineer
- Go Ji-seon – assistant mastering engineer
- Park Nam-yong – choreographer
- Yoon Hee-so – choreographer
- Jang Deok-hee – photographer
- Kang Hye-in – album design
- Kim Jae-yoon – album design
- Park Ju-hee – album design
- Kim Young-jo – music video director
- Yoo Seung-woo – music video director
- Choi Hee-seon – style director
- Im Ji-yeon – style director
- Park Nae-ju – hair director
- Won Jeong-yo – make-up director
- Rado – all instruments and computer programming (on "Cheer Up")
- Jihyo – background vocals (on "Cheer Up", "Tuk Tok", "My Headphones On")
- Hong Ji-sang – all instruments and computer programming (on "Precious Love")
- The Karlsson's – all instruments and computer programming (on "Touchdown")
- EJ Show – all instruments and computer programming (on "Touchdown")
- Twice – background vocals (on "Touchdown")
- Choi Jin-seok – all instruments and computer programming (on "Tuk Tok")
- Daniel Kim – vocal director (on "Tuk Tok"), vocal producer (on "My Headphones On")
- Gong Hyeon-sik – all instruments, computer programming and background vocals (on "Woohoo")
- Jang Jun-ho – all instruments and computer programming (on "Woohoo")
- Jinri – background vocals (on "Precious Love", "Woohoo")
- Niclas Kings – all instruments and computer programming (on "My Headphones On")
- Frants – all instruments and computer programming (on "I'm Gonna Be a Star")

== Charts ==
=== Weekly charts ===
Chart (2016)	Peak position
Japanese Albums (Oricon)	16
South Korean Albums (Gaon)	2
US World Albums (Billboard)	6

=== Year-end charts ===
Chart (2016)	Position
South Korean Albums (Gaon)	13

Chart (2017)	Position
South Korean Albums (Gaon)	69

== Accolades ==
Year	Award	Category	Result	Ref.
2016	8th Melon Music Awards	Best Album Award (Album of the Year)	Nominated	
2016	18th Mnet Asian Music Awards	Album of the Year	Nominated	
2017	6th Gaon Chart Music Awards	Artist of the Year – Physical Album (2nd Quarter)	Nominated	

== Release history ==
Release dates and formats for Page Two
Region	Date	Format(s)	Edition	Label	Ref.
Various	April 25, 2016	Digital download; streaming	Standard	JYP	
South Korea	April 25, 2016	CD	Standard	JYP	
Thailand	September 30, 2016	CD + DVD	Thailand	JYP; BEC-Tero Music	
