= Cheer Up (song) =

2016 single by Twice

Single by Twice

from the EP Page Two
- Language: Korean
- Released: April 25, 2016
- Genre: K-pop; dance-pop
- Length: 3:28
- Label: JYP
- Composer: Black Eyed Pilseung
- Lyricist: Sam Lewis

Twice singles chronology
"Like Ooh-Ahh" (2015)	"Cheer Up" (2016)	"TT" (2016)

Music video
- "Cheer Up" on YouTube

"Cheer Up" (stylized in all caps) is a song recorded by South Korean girl group Twice. It was released by JYP Entertainment on April 25, 2016, as the lead single from their second extended play Page Two. It was written and composed by Sam Lewis and Black Eyed Pilseung respectively.

A major commercial success, the song topped the Gaon Digital Chart and was the best-performing single of 2016 in South Korea. It also won several awards including Song of the Year in two major music awards shows, Melon Music Awards and Mnet Asian Music Awards. The song's "shy shy shy" line became a viral meme and was imitated by many celebrities.

== Background and release ==
"Cheer Up" was released in conjunction with the group's second extended play Page Two on April 25, 2016. On February 24, 2017, Twice officially announced that their debut in Japan was set for June 28. They released a compilation album titled #Twice which consists of ten songs including both Korean and Japanese-language versions of "Cheer Up". The Japanese lyrics were written by Yu Shimoji.

== Composition ==
"Cheer Up"
The lead-up to the chorus shows the diverse voices of Sana, Tzuyu, Momo, Jeongyeon and Jihyo.

"Cheer Up" has lyrics written by Sam Lewis and music by Black Eyed Pilseung, the same team who wrote Twice's hit single "Like Ooh-Ahh" from their debut EP. It is a dance-pop song that incorporates multiple genres, including hip hop, tropical house, and drum and bass; this blend was described as "color pop". Lyrically, the song emotes tease and frustration about a love interest.

== Critical reception ==
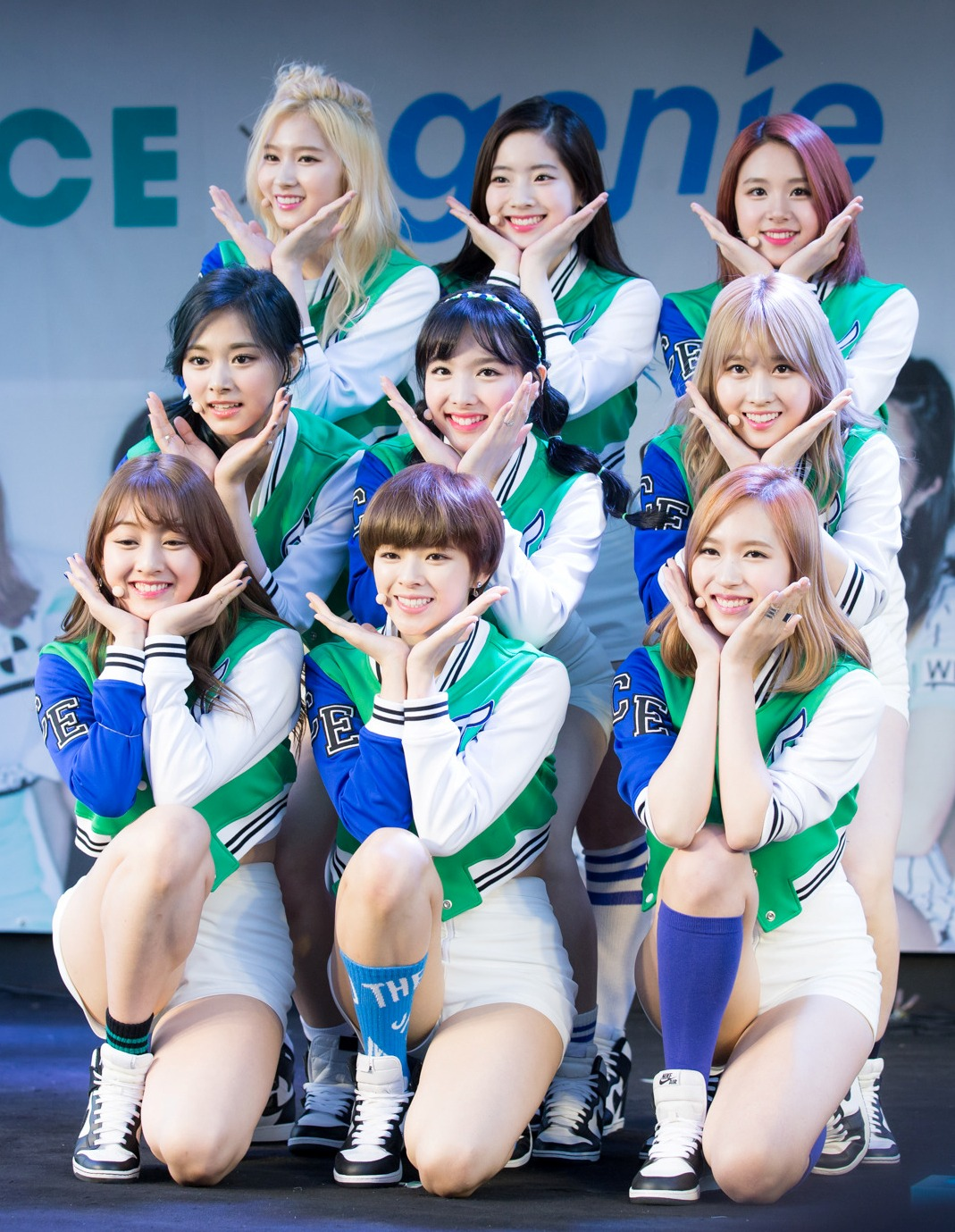
Twice performing "Cheer Up" in May 2016

Tamar Herman of Billboard described "Cheer Up" as an atypical K-pop girl group release that "solidifies Twice's unique style" through its unexpected mix of beats and genres. She further noted that the accompanying music video helped reinforce the members' independent identities while the song showcased of each member's individual voice, "[forgoing] musical wholeness for the sake of eccentricity". Fuse journalists Jason Lipshutz, Tina Xu, and Jeff Benjamin discussed the release in the K-pop-centric podcast K-Stop, describing "Cheer Up" as a 1990s pop throwback reminiscent of Britney Spears' "...Baby One More Time". They praised the single's fun and catchy tone, rap break, and the "incredible" production quality of its music video but criticized its processed vocals and controversial lyrics, which seem to encourage young women to "play games" (i.e., feign disinterest) with their romantic partners. They concluded that, while the group has a lot of potential, they would need to "polish it up" for future releases. Billboard and Dazed included "Cheer Up" in their best K-pop songs of 2016 lists.

== Commercial performance ==
"Cheer Up" was a commercial success, debuting atop the Gaon Digital Chart. It topped the chart for three non-consecutive weeks. The song acculumated 1,839,566 digital sales and 111,556,482 streams in 2016, making it the best performing single of the year. Elsewhere, it entered Billboard's World Digital Song Sales at number three. "Cheer Up" surpassed 2,500,000 downloads in August 2017 on Gaon Music Chart. As of 2018, it has 2,737,015 digital downloads and 160 million streams.

== Music video ==
The music video for "Cheer Up", directed by Kim Young-jo and Yoo Seung-woo of video production team Naive, was released on JYP Entertainment's YouTube Channel on April 25, 2016. It went viral on YouTube soon after it was uploaded, gaining 400,000 views in only thirty minutes. It reached one million views in less than a day, and surpassed seven million views on April 27.

In the music video, the members portray characters from famous films and TV shows. Mina is Itsuki Fujii from Love Letter, Sana is Sailor Moon from the Sailor Moon series, Nayeon is Sidney Prescott from the Scream film series, Tzuyu is Holly Golightly from Breakfast at Tiffany's, and Jeongyeon is Faye from Chungking Express. Momo is an action heroine reminiscent of the Tomb Raider and Resident Evil film series, Jihyo is a cheerleader from Bring It On, Chaeyoung is a cowgirl (reminiscent of different Western films, especially A Fistful of Dollars), and Dahyun is the gisaeng Hwang Jini (from the biopic Hwang Jin Yi). In the group dance scenes, the members are cheerleaders at a pep rally in a soccer stadium and a basketball stadium and in another dance scene, they are in front of a house, decorated as if hosting a party, wearing casual clothing. The song's dance was choreographed by JYP Entertainment choreographers Park Nam-yong and Yun Hee-so.

A special music video, titled "Twice Avengers", was released on May 27 to commemorate the original music video reaching 35 million views on YouTube. In the special video, the members dance in their film character costumes on a set made to look like a planet in outer space. On November 17, the official music video surpassed 100 million views. It then surpassed 200 million views on August 9, 2017, making Twice the first K-pop girl group with two music videos to reach this milestone. The music video also topped 2016 YouTube's Most Popular Music Video in South Korea.

== Accolades ==
Awards and nominations for "Cheer Up"
Award	Year	Category	Result	Ref.
Melon Music Awards	2016	Song of the Year	Won	
Melon Music Awards	2016	Best Dance – Female	Nominated	
Mnet Asian Music Awards	2016	Song of the Year	Won	
Mnet Asian Music Awards	2016	Best Dance Performance – Female Group	Nominated	
Philippine K-pop Awards	2016	Song of the Year	Won	
Gaon Chart Music Awards	2017	Artist of the Year – Digital Music (April)	Won	
Golden Disc Awards	2017	Digital Daesang	Won	
Golden Disc Awards	2017	Digital Bonsang	Won	
Korean Music Awards	2017	Song of the Year	Nominated	
Korean Music Awards	2017	Best Pop Song	Nominated	
Seoul Music Awards	2017	Best Song Award	Won	
Bugs Music Awards	2020	20th Anniversary – Most Loved Music	Won	

Music program awards (11 total)
Program	Date	Ref.
M Countdown	May 5, 2016	
M Countdown	May 19, 2016	
M Countdown	May 26, 2016	
Music Bank	May 6, 2016	
Music Bank	May 20, 2016	
Music Bank	May 27, 2016	
Music Bank	June 3, 2016	
Music Bank	June 10, 2016	
Inkigayo	May 8, 2016	
Inkigayo	May 22, 2016	
Inkigayo	May 29, 2016	

== Charts ==
=== Weekly charts ===
Weekly chart performance
Chart (2016–2017)	Peak position
Japan (Japan Hot 100)	23
Philippines (Philippine Hot 100)	57
South Korea (Gaon)	1
South Korea (K-pop Hot 100)	1
US World Digital Songs (Billboard)	3

=== Year-end charts ===
2016 year-end chart performance for "Cheer Up"
Chart (2016)	Position
South Korea (Gaon)	1

2017 year-end chart performance for "Cheer Up"
Chart (2017)	Position
Japan (Japan Hot 100)	71
South Korea (Gaon)	91

== Certifications and sales ==
Certifications and sales
Region	Certification	Certified units/sales
South Korea	—	2,500,000
Streaming
Japan (RIAJ)	Gold	50,000,000^{†}
South Korea	—	100,000,000
^{†} Streaming-only figures based on certification alone.

== See also ==
- List of Gaon Digital Chart number ones of 2016
