= The Best Thing I Ever Did =

Song by South Korean girl group Twice

Single by Twice

from the EP The Year of "Yes"
- Language: Korean
- Released: December 12, 2018
- Genre: Alternative R&B
- Length: 3:32
- Label: JYP
- Composers: J.Y. Park "The Asiansoul"; Park Ji-min; Jinri; Glory Face; Sophia Pae; Lee Woo-min "collapsedone"; Justin Reinstein
- Lyricists: J.Y. Park "The Asiansoul"; Park Ji-min; Jinri

Twice single singles chronology
"Yes or Yes" (2018)	"The Best Thing I Ever Did" (2018)	"Fancy" (2019)

Music video
- "The Best Thing I Ever Did" on YouTube

"The Best Thing I Ever Did" (Korean: 올해 제일 잘한 일; RR: Olhae jeil jalhan il) is a song recorded by South Korean girl group Twice. It was released by JYP Entertainment on December 12, 2018, as the lead single from the group's third special album, The Year of "Yes" (2018).

== Composition ==
"The Best Thing I Ever Did" was composed by J.Y. Park "The Asiansoul", Park Ji-min, Jinri (Full8loom), Glory Face (Full8loom), Sophia Pae, Lee Woo-min "collapsedone" and Justin Reinstein, with lyrics by J.Y. Park "The Asiansoul", Park Ji-min and Jinri (Full8loom).

The song was classified as an alternative R&B song, which mixes Twice's distinctive pop sound to create a "warm winter sensibility." The holiday-inspired track lyrically describes the memory of meeting a loved one during the holiday season. The song was noted to be Twice's first instance of featuring the R&B genre. Tanu Raj of NME described the song as a "delightful track (that) turns a characteristic lonely season into one of companionship and love". Running for 3 minutes and 32 seconds, the song is composed in the key of F major with a tempo of 105 beats per minute.

== Music video and promotion ==
The holiday-themed music video, directed by Mustache Film, was shot in Ulaanbaatar and Gorkhi-Terelj National Park in Mongolia at the end of October 2018. On December 8, the first music video teaser was released. A second teaser was uploaded on the following day. The music video was released on December 12.

Twice did not promote "The Best Thing I Ever Did" on any South Korean music programs. The song was performed for the first time at the 33rd Golden Disc Awards on January 5, 2019.

== Japanese version ==
The Japanese version of "Best Thing I Ever Did" was released as part of B-side for "Happy Happy" on July 17, 2019. The lyrics were written by Natsumi Watanabe.

In July 2020, JYP Entertainment announced Twice's release of their third compilation album named #Twice3 for September 16. The album, containing twelve tracks with both Korean and Japanese versions of six songs, also includes "The Best Thing I Ever Did".

== Commercial performance ==
"The Best Thing I Ever Did" debuted at number 27 of the Gaon Digital Chart and at number 22 on the Billboard K-pop Hot 100. The song also peaked at number 15 on Billboard's World Digital Song Sales and at number 67 on Japan Hot 100 charts.

== Personnel ==
Credits adapted from Melon.

- Twice – lead vocals
- J.Y. Park – composer, lyrics, arrangement
- Park Ji-min – composer, lyrics
- Jinri – composer, lyrics
- Glory Face – composer
- Sophia Pae – composer
- Lee Woo-min – composer
- Justin Reinstein – composer
- Lee Hae Sol – arrangement

== Charts ==
Chart performance for "The Best Thing I Ever Did"
Chart (2018)	Peak position
Japan (Japan Hot 100)	67
South Korea (Gaon)	27
South Korea (K-pop Hot 100)	22
US World Digital Song Sales (Billboard)	15
