= The Year of "Yes" =

2018 extended play by Twice

- Digital cover

EP (reissue) by Twice
- Released: December 12, 2018
- Studios: JYPE Studios (Seoul, South Korea)
- Genres: K-pop; soul
- Length: 31:23
- Languages: Korean; English
- Label: JYP
- Producer: J. Y. Park "The Asiansoul"

Twice chronology
Yes or Yes (2018)	The Year of "Yes" (2018)	#Twice2 (2019)

Singles from The Year of "Yes"
- 1. "The Best Thing I Ever Did" Released: December 12, 2018

The Year of "Yes" is the reissue of South Korean girl group Twice's sixth EP Yes or Yes. It was released by JYP Entertainment on December 12, 2018. The reissue contains the initial seven tracks from Yes or Yes, along with two new songs: "The Best Thing I Ever Did" and the Korean version of "Be as One" from the group's Japanese album BDZ.

== Background and release ==
Twice first announced the release of an upcoming special album on December 3, 2018, revealing its title to be The Year of "Yes" along with its lead single "The Best Thing I Ever Did", slated to be released on December 12. Group photo teasers for the special album were uploaded on social media accounts on the same day. Individual teaser photos featuring Nayeon, Jeongyeon, and Momo were uploaded on December 4, along with the track list for The Year of "Yes", revealing that J.Y. Park, Park Ji-min, and five other songwriters had collaborated to write and compose the album's lead single. It was also announced that the album would include the Korean version of "Be as One" from Twice's previously released album BDZ. On December 5, the group unveiled individual teaser photos featuring Sana, Jihyo, and Mina. On December 6, the last set of individual teaser photos featuring Dahyun, Chaeyoung, and Tzuyu were released. Additional group teaser photos were uploaded on December 7.

On December 8, Twice uploaded their first music video teaser for "The Best Thing I Ever Did". A second teaser was uploaded on the following day An audio preview for "The Best Thing I Ever Did" was released by the group on December 10. An album medley which featured snippets for both "The Best Thing I Ever Did" and "Be as One" (Korean ver.) was uploaded on December 11. The Year of "Yes" was officially released on December 12, 6PM KST.

== Composition ==
The Year of "Yes" contains two new tracks. "The Best Thing I Ever Did" was written and composed by seven different songwriters, including J.Y. Park and Park Ji-min. It was classified as an alternative R&B song which mixes Twice's distinctive pop sound to create a "warm winter sensibility." The holiday-inspired track lyrically describes the memory of meeting a loved one during the holiday season. The song was noted to be Twice's first instance of featuring the R&B genre. The second song, "Be as One", is a Korean version of their Japanese track from BDZ, and is classified as a ballad song.

== Commercial performance ==
The Year of "Yes" debuted at number 2 on the Weekly Gaon Album Chart. It became the third best-selling album on Gaon in December 2018, selling a total of 196,034 copies. With this, the album ranked at number 23 on the year-end Gaon Album Chart for 2018. In March 2023, the album reached 250,000 total sales and was certified Platinum by the Korea Music Content Association.

== Track listing ==
The Year of "Yes"
No.	Title	Lyrics	Music	Arrangement	Length
1.	"The Best Thing I Ever Did" (올해 제일 잘한 일; Olhae jeil jalhan il)	J.Y. Park "The Asiansoul"; Park Ji-min; Jinri (Full8loom)	J.Y. Park; Park Ji-min; Jinri (Full8loom); Glory Face (영광의얼굴들) (Full8loom); Sophia Pae; Lee Woo-min "collapsedone"; Justin Reinstein	J.Y. Park; Lee Hae-sol	3:32
2.	"Be as One" (Korean ver.)	Lee Ha-jin; Choi Hyun-jun; Kim Seung-soo; Risa Horie	Choi Hyun-jun; Kim Seung-soo	Choi Hyun-jun; Kim Seung-soo	3:49
3.	"Yes or Yes"	Sim Eun-jee	David Amber; Andy Love	David Amber	3:58
4.	"Say You Love Me"	Sophia Pae; Secret Weapon	Sophia Pae; Secret Weapon	Secret Weapon	3:33
5.	"LaLaLa"	Jeongyeon	Albi Albertsson; Akina Ingold	Mussashi (A. Albertsson)	3:06
6.	"Young & Wild"	Chaeyoung; Kim Hyun-yoo (Flying Lab)	Kim Petras; CJ Abraham; MkX	MkX	3:01
7.	"Sunset"	Jihyo	Maria Marcus; Lisa Desmond; Fast Lane; Secret Weapon	Secret Weapon	3:43
8.	"After Moon"	Iggy (Oreo); C-no (Oreo); Woong Kim (Oreo)	Iggy (Oreo); C-no (Oreo); Woong Kim (Oreo)	Woong Kim (Oreo)	3:24
9.	"BDZ" (Korean ver.)	J.Y. Park	J.Y. Park	J.Y. Park; Lee Hae-sol	3:16
Total length:					31:23

== Charts ==
=== Weekly charts ===
Chart (2018)	Peak position
Japan Hot Albums (Billboard)	72
South Korean Albums (Gaon)	2

=== Year-end charts ===
Chart (2018)	Position
South Korean Albums (Gaon)	23

== Certifications ==
Certifications for The Year of "Yes"
Region	Certification	Certified units/sales
South Korea (KMCA)	Platinum	250,000^{^}
^{^} Shipments figures based on certification alone.
