= More & More (EP) =

2020 extended play by Twice

- Digital cover

EP by Twice
- Released: June 1, 2020
- Genres: EDM; tropical house
- Length: 22:15
- Languages: Korean; English
- Labels: JYP; Republic

Twice chronology
&Twice (2019)	More & More (2020)	#Twice3 (2020)

Singles from More & More
- 1. "More & More" Released: June 1, 2020

More & More is the ninth extended play by South Korean girl group Twice. It was released by JYP Entertainment and Republic Records on June 1, 2020. Marketed as the group's ninth "mini album" release, it consists of seven tracks, including the lead single of the same name. It is their first release with Republic Records.

The EP consists of seven tracks that feature various genres including Latin pop, new jack swing, bass music, and tropical house. It received generally favorable reviews from music critics, who praised Twice's musical growth as they adapted a more mature style. More & More sold more than 563,000 copies on the Gaon Album Chart, becoming Twice's best-selling album until it was surpassed by Formula of Love: O+T=<3 in 2021. It is their first entry on the US Billboard 200, charting at number 200.

== Background and release ==
It was first reported by media outlets on April 20, 2020, that Twice were in the final stages of preparation for an upcoming album as well as music video filming. JYP Entertainment confirmed the reports later that day. On April 28, Twice held an online press conference for their YouTube original series Twice: Seize the Light, with member Jihyo confirming that their comeback was set for June 1. The members then revealed the title of their upcoming single to be "More & More". It is the group's first comeback as a nine-piece group after member Mina took a break from activities due to mental health issues.

In May, it was confirmed that the upcoming EP would share the name of its lead single, and feature production and songwriting by J. Y. Park and a team of international songwriters and producers including MNEK of Britain, Zara Larsson of Sweden, and American singer-songwriter Julia Michaels.

The EP, and accompanying music video for its title track, were released on June 1. It marked the group's first release in partnership with American label Republic Records, who they had signed with earlier in the year.

== Composition ==
More & More consists of seven tracks that feature various genres, including Latin pop, new jack swing, bass music, and tropical pop, among others. Talking about the album's title track, member Jeongyeon stated that the group wanted to create a track that was different from what they had done before. The title track is a tropical pop song featuring an EDM-heavy chorus and instrumental bridge which lyrically depicts a theme of desire. "Oxygen" describes the growth of a romance which develops from an innocent affection to a fiery love. "Firework" features a Latin-inspired rhythm that opens with a guitar line, with the members lyrically comparing themselves to exploding pyrotechnics as they describe the sensation of a romantic relationship. "Make Me Go" is a song written by Nayeon that discusses the feeling of passion. "Shadow" conveys underlying pain that one feels and hides in the middle of an active relationship. "Don't Call Me Again" is a straightforward portrayal of a romantic breakup. The closing track written by Jeongyeon and Chaeyoung, "Sweet Summer Day", does not explicitly reference love with its lyrics encouraging one to leave behind the worries of yesterday.

== Promotion ==
In support of their album, Twice performed its lead single on various South Korean music programs starting with M Countdown on June 4, 2020. This was followed by performances on Music Bank and Inkigayo. In their second week of promotion, Twice received their first music show trophy for "More & More" on Show Champion. The group appeared as guests on the June 7 episode of the variety show Running Man. Following their music show win on June 12 on Music Bank with "More & More", the group had accumulated a total of 100 music show wins throughout their career.

On August 9, Twice held their first online concert titled Beyond Live – Twice: World in a Day, with the group performing 15 songs, including three tracks from their latest EP release: "More & More", "Shadow", and "Firework". Expanding their reach globally, Twice released an English-language version of "More & More" on August 21.

== Critical reception ==
Kim Do-heon of IZM gave a generally favorable review to the album, stating that Twice is "one step closer to building a stable album with More & More," citing the pool of international producers and songwriters as well as the variety of music genres included in the material as a strength which "presents the possibility of [further] collaborations". Writer Kat Moon from Time magazine describes that the album "might have been disjointed, yet More & More is one of Twice's most cohesive albums, in large part because its seven songs build on a progressing storyline." She also praised the group for managing to adapt a more mature concept without giving up their trademark bright demeanor, and states that "Twice is a versatile ensemble keen on surprising their audience." Amanda Lee of Sound Digest states that all seven songs from the album will "have you ready to make some sweet summer memories", while also noting the continuing maturity of Twice's musical direction.

== Commercial performance ==
On May 27, it was reported that the pre-order sales of More & More had surpassed 500,000, becoming a half-million seller before release and Twice's best-selling release. Hanteo Chart recorded over 265,000 copies sold on the first day, setting a new record for the group. On July 2, Gaon Chart confirmed that More & More reached 563,000 copies sold in shipments, making it not only Twice's best-selling album to date, but also setting a record for the highest album sales volume by a girl group in Gaon Chart history. With this, the group had reached an accumulated total of 5.26 million albums sold throughout their career.

More & More debuted at number 1 on the Gaon Album Chart, while all of its tracks charted on the Gaon Download Chart, with the title track topping it. The EP also debuted atop the Oricon Albums Chart and at number 3 on the Billboard Japan Hot Albums chart. It also debuted at number 25 on the UK Album Downloads Chart, making it their highest entry and second overall. The EP also entered at number 200 on the Billboard 200, making Twice the fifth South Korean girl group to break into the chart, after Girls' Generation-TTS, Girls' Generation, 2NE1, and Blackpink. It also charted at number 3 on the US Heatseekers Albums and at number 2 on the World Albums charts, respectively, making it Twice's eleventh top 10 entry on the latter.

== Track listing ==
Adapted from the group's official website.

No.	Title	Lyrics	Music	Arrangement	Length
1.	"More & More"	J. Y. Park; Bibi	Uzoechi Emenike (MNEK); Justin Tranter; Julia Michaels; Zara Larsson	MNEK; J. Y. Park; Lee Hae-sol	3:19
2.	"Oxygen"	JQ; Jeong Il-kwon (makeumine works)	Johan Gustafsson; Josefin Glenmark	Gustafsson	3:45
3.	"Firework"	Kim Soo-jeong	Billie Jean (BADD); Kim Jin-hyung; Slyberry; Sophia Pae	Slyberry; Kim Jin-hyung; Billie Jean (BADD)	3:13
4.	"Make Me Go"	Nayeon	Ryan Ashley; Lewis Jankel; BB Diamond	Shift K3Y	3:06
5.	"Shadow"	Jo Yoon-kyung	Greg Bonnick; Hayden Chapman; Chloe Latimer; Hannah Wilson	LDN Noise	2:48
6.	"Don't Call Me Again"	Park Lee-soo	Markus "Mack" Sepehrmanesh; Emanuel "Email" Abrahamsson; Imani Williams; Iman Conta Hultén	Mack; Email	2:53
7.	"Sweet Summer Day"	Jeongyeon; Chaeyoung	Drew Ryan Scott; Gabe Lopez; Sean Michael Alexander	Lopez	3:11
Total length:					22:15

== Personnel ==
Credits adapted from album liner notes.

- J.Y. Park "The Asiansoul" – producer, vocal director (on "More & More")
- Kim Yeo-joo (Jane Kim) – music (A&R)
- Choi Eun-su – music admin (A&R)
- Kim Ji-hyung – production (A&R)
- Kim Yu-ju – production (A&R)
- Kang Gun – production (A&R)
- Hwang Hyun-jun – production (A&R)
- Kim Tae-eun – design (A&R), album art director & designer
- Seo Yeon-ah – design (A&R), album art director & designer, web designer
- Lee So-yeon – design (A&R), album art director & designer, web designer
- Hwang Si-nae – admin (A&R)
- Choi Hye-jin – recording engineer, digital editor
- Eom Se-hee – recording engineer, digital editor
- Lee Sang-yeop – recording engineer, digital editor
- Park Eun-jung – recording engineer
- Goo Hye-jin – assistant recording engineer
- Lee Tae-seob – mixing engineer
- Lim Hong-jin – mixing engineer
- Kwon Nam-woo – mastering engineer
- NAIVE Production – video director
- Kim Yeong-jo – video executive producer
- Yoo Seung-woo – video executive producer
- Kim Eui-mil – photographer
- Park Gyu-tae – assistant photographer
- Kim Hyun-tae – assistant photographer
- Park Hyun-kyung – assistant photographer
- Jung Nan-young at LULU – hair director
- Son Eun-hee at LULU – hair director
- Choi Ji-young at LULU – hair director
- Lim Jin-hee at LULU – hair director
- Heo Yeon-ji at LULU – hair director
- Park Min-jung at LULU – hair director
- Jo Sang-ki at LULU – makeup director
- Zia at LULU – makeup director
- Jeon Dal-rae at LULU – makeup director
- Won Jung-yo at BIT&BOOT – makeup director
- Choi Gyeong-won at F9ISSUE – style director
- Shin Hyun-kuk – management & marketing director
- Kiel Tutin – choreographer
- Leejung Lee – choreographer
- Twice – lead vocals
- Lee Hae-sol – vocal director (on "More & More", "Sweet Summer Day")
- Sophia Pae – background vocals (on "More & More", "Firework", "Shadow"), vocal director (on "Firework", "Shadow")
- Brayton Bowman – background vocals (on "More & More")
- Zara Larsson – background vocals (on "More & More")
- Johan Gustafsson – all instruments, additional background vocals (on "Oxygen")
- Josefin Glenmark – additional background vocals (on "Oxygen")
- Kim Yeon-seo – background vocals (on "Oxygen", "Make Me Go", "Don't Call Me Again", "Sweet Summer Day"), vocal director (on "Oxygen", "Make Me Go", "Don't Call Me Again")
- minGtion – digital editor (on "Firework")
- Slyberry – bass, guitar (on "Firework")
- Choi Jae-yeol – drum (on "Firework")
- Kim Jin-hyung – keyboard (on "Firework")
- Ryan Ashley – vocal arranger (on "Make Me Go")
- Jeong Yoo-ra – digital editor (on "Make Me Go", "Shadow", "Don't Call Me Again", "Sweet Summer Day")
- Greg Bonnick – keyboard, drums, programming (on "Shadow")
- Hayden Chapman – keyboard, drums, programming (on "Shadow")
- Email – all instruments (on "Don't Call Me Again")
- Gabe Lopez – all instruments (on "Sweet Summer Day")

== Charts ==
=== Weekly charts ===
Weekly chart performance for More & More
Chart (2020)	Peak position
Belgian Albums (Ultratop Flanders)	87
Belgian Albums (Ultratop Wallonia)	115
Japan Hot Albums (Billboard Japan)	3
Japanese Albums (Oricon)	1
Polish Albums (ZPAV)	7
South Korean Albums (Gaon)	1
Swedish Physical Albums (Sverigetopplistan)	4
UK Album Downloads (Official Charts)	25
US Billboard 200	200
US Heatseekers Albums (Billboard)	3
US World Albums (Billboard)	2

=== Year-end charts ===
Chart (2020)	Position
Japanese Albums (Oricon)	31
South Korean Albums (Gaon)	12

== Certifications ==
Region	Certification	Certified units/sales
South Korea (KMCA)	2× Platinum	500,000^{^}
^{^} Shipments figures based on certification alone.

== Accolades ==
Awards and nominations for More & More
Year	Award	Category	Result	Ref.
2021	35th Golden Disc Awards	Album Bonsang	Won	
2021	35th Golden Disc Awards	Album Daesang	Nominated	
2021	10th Gaon Chart Music Awards	Artist of the Year – Physical Album (3rd Quarter)	Nominated	

== See also ==
- List of Gaon Album Chart number ones of 2020
