= Twice: Seize the Light =

2020 documentary series starring Twice

- Promotional poster
- Hangul: 시즈 더 라이트
- RR: Sijeu deo raiteu
- MR: Sijŭ tŏ rait'ŭ
- Genre: Documentary miniseries
- Created by: JYP Entertainment
- Written by: Sera Baek
- Directed by: Heejin Jeong; Jungho Li
- Starring: Twice
- Country of origin: South Korea
- Original language: Korean
- No. of seasons: 1
- No. of episodes: 9

Production
- Executive producer: Jimmy Jeong
- Producers: Peter Lee; Park Jin-young; Juyeon Kang
- Editors: Seokwon Choi; Heejin Jeong; Jungho Li
- Camera setup: Single-camera
- Running time: 14–22 minutes
- Production companies: JYP Entertainment; YouTube

Original release
- Network: YouTube Premium
- Release: April 29 – June 24, 2020

Twice: Seize the Light (stylized as TWICE: Seize the Light) is a 2020 South Korean documentary show starring Nayeon, Jeongyeon, Momo, Sana, Jihyo, Mina, Dahyun, Chaeyoung, and Tzuyu. Directed by Heejin Jeong and Jungho Li, the documentary is about the experience of the South Korean girl group Twice on their first successful world tour, "Twicelights," in 2019. It was released worldwide on YouTube Originals on April 29, 2020.

== Synopsis ==
The all-access documentary covers the struggle they experienced on their first world tour in 2019, with their stress backstage during the "Twicelights" tour and overcoming those struggles through trust and reliance on each other, as well as their journey from being trainees up to their first world tour.

== Cast ==
- Nayeon
- Jeongyeon
- Momo
- Sana
- Jihyo
- Mina
- Dahyun
- Chaeyoung
- Tzuyu
- Park Jin-young

== Production ==
In August 2019, Billboard revealed that YouTube and JYP Entertainment had cooperated and partnered to create a YouTube docu-series. This is the first documentary series that Twice has made. Before the release of Twice: Seize the Light episode 1, Jihyo announced the release date of their ninth EP, More & More.

== Promotion ==
On April 13, 2020, the official teaser was released on their YouTube channel, announcing the premiere of their docu-series on their social media accounts.

== Reception ==
The series was reviewed by Kwon Yae-rim of The Korea Herald, who said that she enjoyed the episodes, but wished that they had gone into more depth. Nadie Esteban of Cosmopolitan also commented on the series, stating that it was "a great opportunity for fans to become closer to Twice in a very personal way."
