= Twice3 =

2020 compilation album by Twice

#Twice3
- Standard edition cover

Compilation album by Twice
- Released: September 16, 2020
- Genres: J-pop; K-pop
- Length: 41:27
- Languages: Japanese; Korean; English
- Label: Warner Music Japan

Twice chronology
More & More (2020)	#Twice3 (2020)	Eyes Wide Open (2020)

Singles from #Twice3
- 1. "Stuck in My Head (Japanese ver.)" Released: September 2, 2020

#Twice3 (Hashtag Twice3) is the third Japanese compilation album released by South Korean girl group Twice. The album consists of Japanese and Korean versions of "Fancy", "Feel Special", "More & More", "Stuck In My Head", "21:29" and "The Best Thing I Ever Did". It was released on September 16, 2020, under Warner Music Japan.

== Background and release ==
Following the commercial success of Twice's Japanese single "Fanfare", JYP Entertainment released the cover image for #Twice3 on July 17, 2020, at 12AM KST, and confirmed in an official statement that the Japanese compilation album was set to be released on September 16. 12 tracks were confirmed to be featured in the album, including the Japanese versions of "The Best Thing I Ever Did", "Fancy" (2019), "Feel Special" (2019) and "More & More" (2020).

The pre-release track "Stuck In My Head" was released on September 2. The compilation album was officially released on September 16.

== Commercial performance ==
Following its release, #Twice3 debuted atop the daily Oricon Albums Chart, selling 67,808 copies in the first day. #Twice3 would then top the weekly Oricon Albums Chart on September 22, 2020, with sales of over 109,000 copies. It was the group's seventh album to top the chart and made Twice the second foreign female artist to achieve the feat, following South Korean singer BoA.

== Track listing ==
#Twice3 — Standard edition
No.	Title	Lyrics	Music	Arrangement	Length
1.	"The Best Thing I Ever Did" (Japanese version)	Natsumi Watanabe	J.Y. Park "The Asiansoul"; Park Ji-min; Jinri (Full8loom); Glory Faces (Full8loom); Sophiya; Collapsedone; Justin Reinstein	J.Y. Park "The Asiansoul"; Lee Hae-sol	3:32
2.	"Fancy" (Japanese version)	Eri Osanai	Black Eyed Pilseung; Jeongun	Rado	3:36
3.	"Feel Special" (Japanese version)	J.Y. Park "The Asiansoul"; Natsumi Watanabe	J.Y. Park "The Asiansoul"; Ollipop; Hayley Aitken; collapsedone	collapsedone	3:29
4.	"More & More" (Japanese version)	J.Y. Park "The Asiansoul"; BIBI; Natsumi Watanabe	Uzoechi Emenike; Justin Tranter; Julia Michaels; Zara Larsson	MNEK; J.Y. Park "The Asiansoul"; Lee Hae-sol	3:21
5.	"Stuck In My Head" (Japanese version)	Phil Bentley; Matthew Tishler; Andrew Underberg; Yuki Kokobo; Lee Seu-ran; Co-sho	Matthew Tishler; Andrew Underberg; Philip Bentley	Matthew Tishler; Andrew Underberg	2:56
6.	"21:29" (Japanese version)	Twice; Eri Osanai; Mio Jorakuji	MonoTree	Lee Ju-hyung	3:48
7.	"The Best Thing I Ever Did"	J.Y. Park "The Asiansoul"; Park Ji-min; Jinri (Full8loom)	J.Y. Park "The Asiansoul"; Park Ji-min; Jinri (Full8loom); Sophiya; Lee Woo-min 'Collapsedone'; Justin Reinstein	J.Y. Park "The Asiansoul"; Lee Hae-sol	3:32
8.	"Fancy"	Black Eyed Pilseung; Jeon Goon	Black Eyed Pilseung; Jeon Goon	Rado	3:33
9.	"Feel Special"	Park Jin-young	J.Y. Park "The Asiansoul"; OLLIPOP; Hayley Aitken	Lee Woo-min 'Collapsedone'	3:26
10.	"More & More"	BIBI; J.Y. Park "The Asiansoul"	Uzoechi Emenike (MNEK); Justin Tranter; Julia Michaels; Zara Larsson	David Amber	3:27
11.	"Stuck In My Head"	Lee Seu-ran	Matthew Tishler; Andrew Underberg; Philip Bentley	Tishler; Underberg	2:58
12.	"21:29"	Twice	Lee Joo-hyoung (MonoTree); Sophia pae	Lee	3:49
Total length:					41:27

#Twice3 — Limited edition B (DVD)
No.	Title	Length
1.	"Fancy (Japanese ver.) Music Video"
2.	"The Best Thing I Ever Did Music Video"
3.	"FANCY Music Video"
4.	"Feel Special Music Video"
5.	"FANCY (Japanese ver.) Music Video Making Movie"
6.	"#TWICE3 Jacket Shooting Making Movie"
7.	"Making Movie of TWICE WORLD TOUR 2019 'TWICELIGHTS' IN JAPAN"

== Charts ==
=== Weekly charts ===
Weekly chart performance for #Twice3
Chart (2020)	Peak position
Japanese Albums (Oricon)	1
Japanese Hot Albums (Billboard Japan)	1

=== Year-end charts ===
Year-end chart performance for #Twice3
Chart (2020)	Position
Japanese Albums (Oricon)	26
Japan Hot Albums (Billboard Japan)	29

== Certifications ==
Region	Certification	Certified units/sales
Japan (RIAJ)	Gold	100,000^{^}
^{^} Shipments figures based on certification alone.

== Release history ==
Release dates and formats for #Twice3
Region	Date	Format(s)	Edition	Label	Ref.
Various	September 16, 2020	Digital download; streaming	Standard Edition	Warner Music Japan	
Japan	September 16, 2020	CD	Standard Edition	Warner Music Japan	
Japan	September 16, 2020	CD + Photo Book	Limited Edition A	Warner Music Japan	
Japan	September 16, 2020	CD + DVD	Limited Edition B	Warner Music Japan	
Japan	September 27, 2023	Vinyl	Limited Edition	Warner Music Japan	
