= Twice =

South Korean girl group

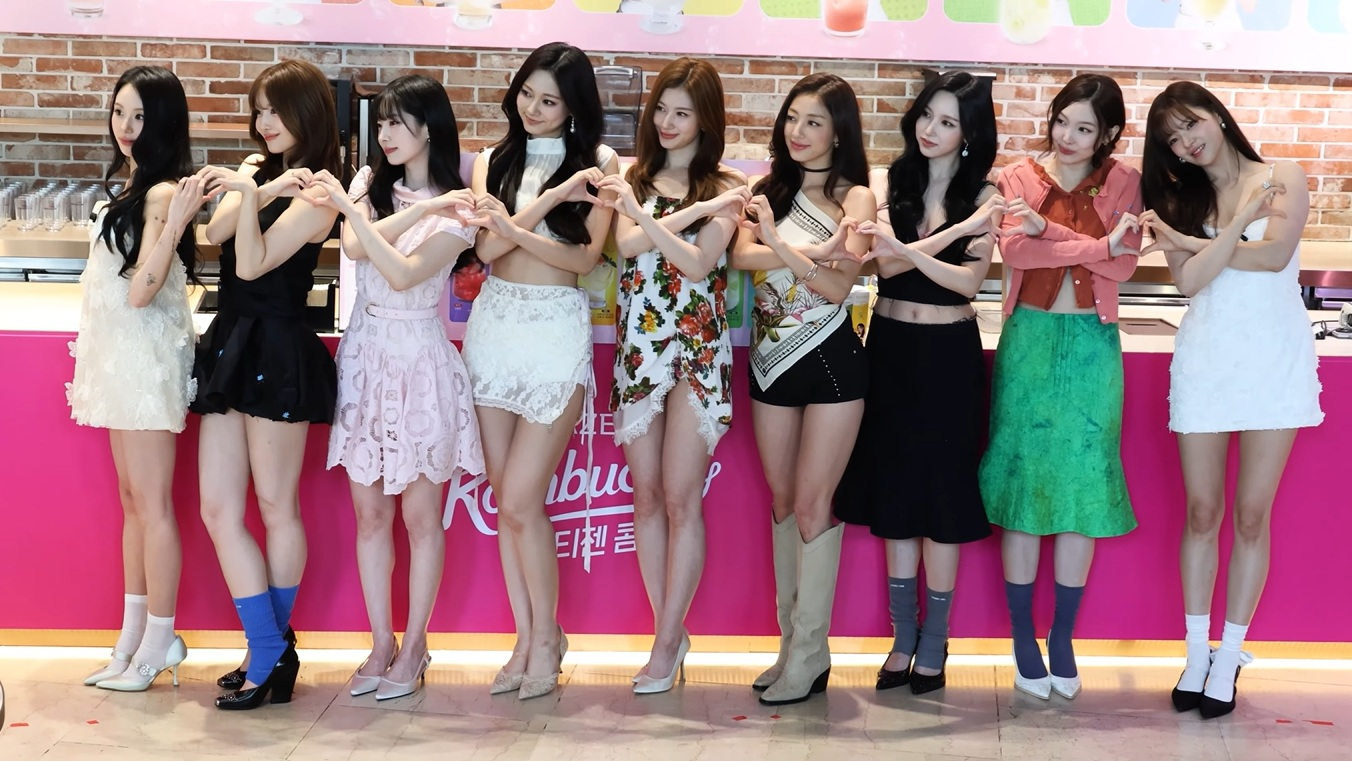
- Twice in 2026; From left to right: Chaeyoung, Momo, Dahyun, Tzuyu, Sana, Jihyo, Mina, Nayeon, Jeongyeon

Background information
- Origin: Seoul, South Korea
- Genres: K-pop; J-pop; bubblegum pop; dance-pop; EDM
- Works: Albums; singles; songs
- Years active: 2015–present
- Labels: JYP; Warner Japan; Republic
- Member of: JYP Nation
- Spinoffs: MiSaMo
- Members: Nayeon; Jeongyeon; Momo; Sana; Jihyo; Mina; Dahyun; Chaeyoung; Tzuyu
- Website: twice.jype.com

Twice (Korean: 트와이스, stylized in all caps) is a South Korean girl group formed by JYP Entertainment. The group is composed of nine members: Nayeon, Jeongyeon, Momo, Sana, Jihyo, Mina, Dahyun, Chaeyoung, and Tzuyu. They are recognized as one of the best-selling girl groups of all time and are widely regarded as one of K-pop's most influential acts. Twice have been dubbed "The Nation's Girl Group" in their home country and are credited for their role in leading the re-emergence of girl groups in the Korean Wave. Initially known for their bright and youthful image, the group has since evolved to explore an array of sounds and concepts.

Twice was formed under the television program Sixteen (2015) and debuted on October 20, 2015, with the extended play (EP) The Story Begins. They rose to domestic fame in 2016 with their single "Cheer Up", which charted at number one on the Gaon Digital Chart, became the best-performing single of the year, and won "Song of the Year" at the Melon Music Awards and Mnet Asian Music Awards. The group's next single, "TT", from their third EP Twicecoaster: Lane 1, topped the Gaon charts for four consecutive weeks. The EP was the highest selling Korean girl group album of 2016. Within 19 months after debut, Twice had already sold over 1.2 million units of their four EPs and special album. As of 2022, the group has sold over 14 million albums cumulatively in South Korea and Japan.

The group debuted in Japan on June 28, 2017, under Warner Music Japan, with the release of a compilation album titled #Twice. The album charted at number 2 on the Oricon Albums Chart with the highest first-week album sales by a K-pop artist in Japan in two years. It was followed by the release of Twice's first original Japanese maxi single titled "One More Time" in October. Twice became the first Korean girl group to earn a platinum certification from the Recording Industry Association of Japan (RIAJ) for both an album and CD single in the same year. Twice ranked third in the Top Artist category of Billboard Japan's 2017 Year-end Rankings, and in 2019, they became the first Korean girl group to embark on a Japanese dome tour.

Twice is the first female Korean act to simultaneously top both Billboard's World Albums and World Digital Song Sales charts with the release of their first studio album Twicetagram and its lead single "Likey" in 2017. With the release of their single "Feel Special" in 2019, Twice became the third female Korean act to chart into the Canadian Hot 100. After signing with Republic Records for American promotions as part of a partnership with JYP Entertainment, the group achieved seven top-ten albums on the US Billboard 200 and topped the chart in 2024 with their thirteenth extended play With You-th. Their first official English-language single, "The Feels" (2021), became their first song to enter the US Billboard Hot 100 and the UK Singles Chart, peaking at the 83rd and 80th positions of the charts, respectively. Their point choreography—including for "Cheer Up" (2016), "TT" (2016), "Signal" (2017), and "What Is Love?" (2018)—became dance crazes and viral memes.

== History ==
=== 2013–2015: Formation and debut ===
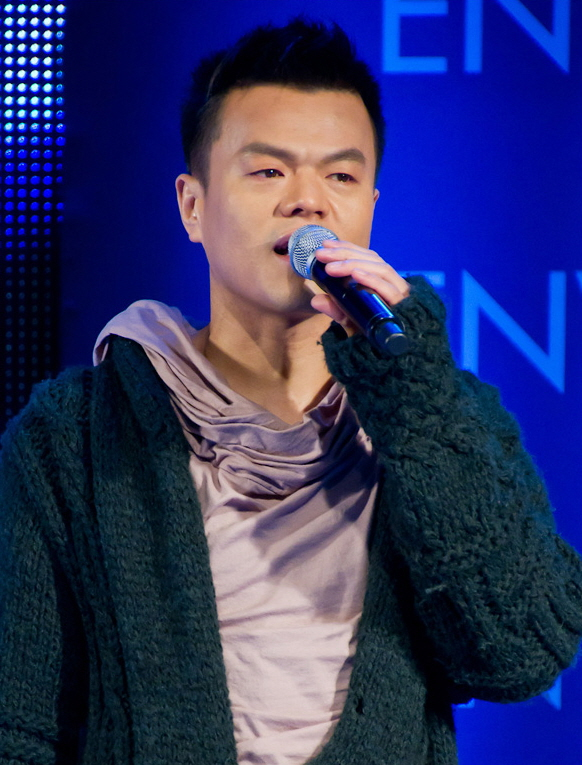
JYPE founder J. Y. Park is credited with creating the group's name

On December 19, 2013, JYP Entertainment (JYPE) announced that they would debut a new girl group in the first half of 2014; the first female group to come out of the company since the debut of Miss A in 2010. On February 27, 2014, JYPE trainees Lena and Cecilia were confirmed as members of the group tentatively called as 6MIX, while other rumored members included JYPE trainees Nayeon, Jeongyeon, Jihyo, and Minyoung. The group's debut plan was eventually canceled when Lena and Cecilia left the company.

Official logo

On February 11, 2015, J. Y. Park, the founder of JYPE, announced that the lineup of the upcoming seven-member girl group would be decided through Sixteen, a competition survival show that would air on Mnet later that year. The show began on May 5 and ended on July 7 with Nayeon, Jeongyeon, Sana, Jihyo, Mina, Dahyun, and Chaeyoung being selected as the seven Twice members. Park then announced that he would increase the size of the group from seven members to nine by adding Tzuyu, who was known as the "audience's pick" since she was the most popular contestant by the show's end, and Momo, who was added by Park himself since he felt the group needed someone with Momo's performance abilities. The decision was controversial at the time, with many people complaining about eliminated contestants being able to join the group. The group's name, Twice, was chosen by Park, explaining that "the group will touch people's hearts twice: once through the ears, and once again through the eyes". Fans of Twice are known as "Once", commonly stylized in all caps, illustrated by the members' statement "If you love us even once, we will repay your love with twice of our love" on social media in 2015.

Twice made their official debut on October 20, 2015, with the release of their debut EP The Story Begins and its lead single "Like Ooh-Ahh", alongside a live showcase to promote it. The group initially received a lukewarm reception; while their EP debuted at number 4 on the Gaon Album Chart for the week ending October 24 (before peaking at number 3 two weeks later), "Like Ooh-Ahh" met moderate success, debuting at number 22 on the Gaon Digital Chart. A week after its release, the single dropped to number 57 on South Korea's largest music site Melon, but through word of mouth from netizens regarding the group's subsequent promotions and performances, "Like Ooh-Ahh" reached within the top 10 of various Korean music charts including Melon, Genie, and Naver Music by November 15. Such a reverse run on music charts by a rookie girl group was deemed unusual by Korean media. Eventually, "Like Ooh-Ahh" reached a peak position of number 10 on the Gaon Digital Chart, three months after the song's original release. The music video for the group's single hit 50 million views on YouTube within five months of their debut and became one of the most-viewed debut music videos for any K-pop group. The group's early success earned them a "Best New Female Artist" award at the 2015 Mnet Asian Music Awards held on December 2. On December 27, Twice performed a remix version of their single "Like Ooh-Ahh" at SBS Gayo Daejeon, which was the group's first-ever attendance on a year-end music program.

=== 2016: Career breakthrough ===
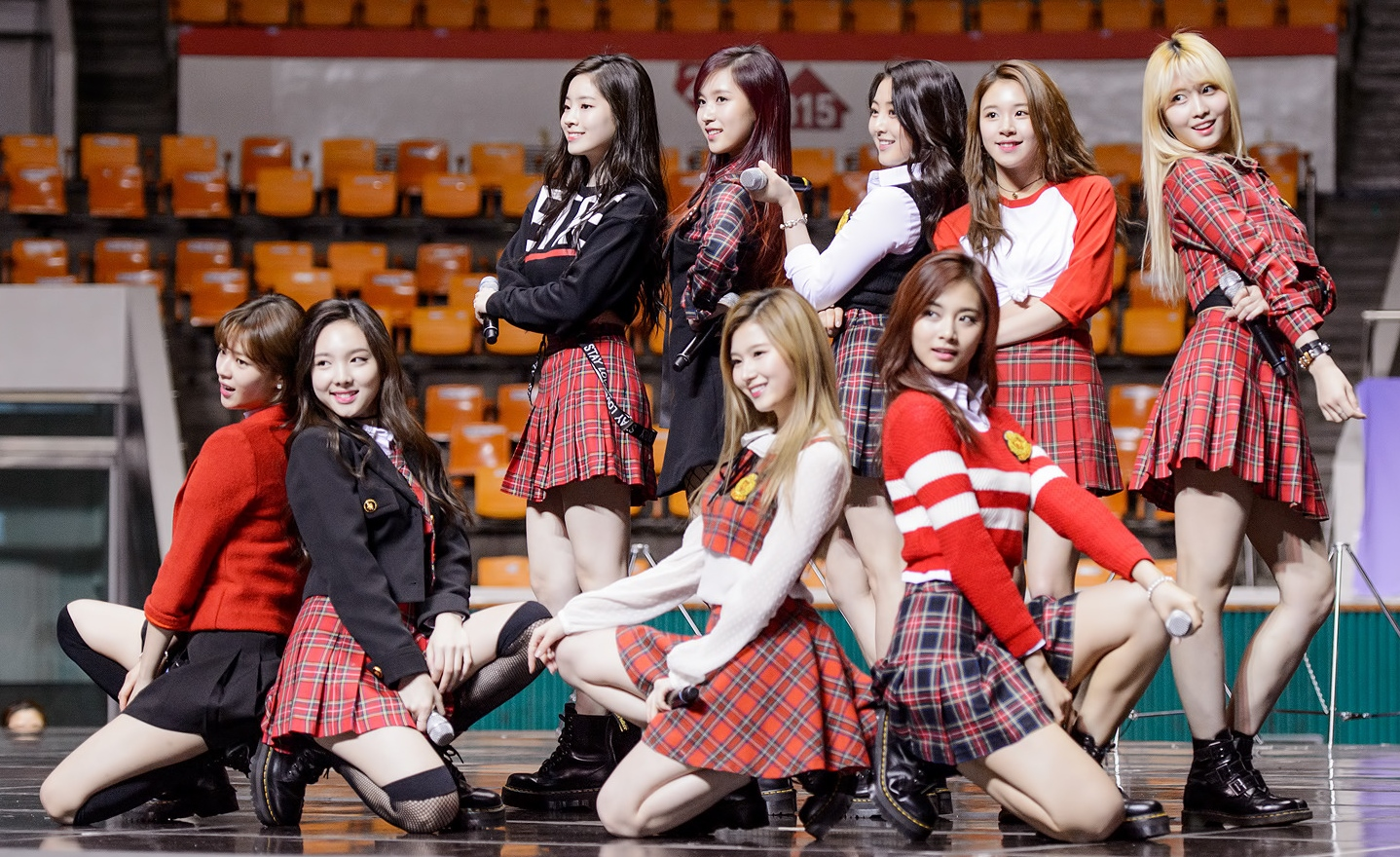
Twice performing at Seoul Arts College in February 2016

On its chart issue dated January 23, 2016, Billboard reported that Twice had entered its World Albums chart, with their debut EP The Story Begins debuting and peaking at number 15, which marked the group's first entry on the chart.

On April 25, 2016, Twice released their second EP, Page Two, which notably included the lead single "Cheer Up", a rearranged version of Park Ji-yoon's 1998 hit "Precious Love", and "I'm Gonna Be a Star", which served as the theme song for Sixteen. The album became a commercial success for the group, debuting at number two on the Gaon Album Chart and number six on the Billboard World Albums chart, with 80,686 units sold during the month of April. With the total first-week sales volume for Page Two reaching approximately 41,800 copies, Twice achieved the highest first-week sales volume by a Korean girl group for the year. By August, Page Two had sold over 150,000 copies, making Twice the first girl group having a sales record of more than 100,000 units that year. Meanwhile, the album's lead single "Cheer Up" became the group's first chart-topper in South Korea, debuting at number 1 on eight real-time music charts immediately after its release, before going on to debut atop both the Gaon Digital Chart and the Billboard K-pop Hot 100 chart. Notably, the song became a viral meme in South Korea due to the "shy shy shy" line sung by Sana. Eventually, the song became the best-performing single in South Korea for the entirety of 2016. "Cheer Up" also received international success, debuting and peaking at number three on the Billboard World Digital Song Sales chart. Additionally, Twice became the only Korean act to place an entry on the U.S. YouTube Music Chart for the year when "Cheer Up" charted at number 25 in May.

Twice won their first music program award with "Cheer Up" on May 5, on M Countdown, exactly one year after the initial airing of Sixteen. This was soon followed by wins on Music Bank and Inkigayo. The group then made their debut performance in the United States with an appearance at the KCON music festival held in Los Angeles on July 31. On August 6–7, Twice and their JYP Entertainment labelmates held a concert at Jamsil Arena in Seoul, titled JYP Nation 2016 "Mix & Match". This was followed by shows at Yoyogi National Gymnasium in Tokyo on September 2–4.

In celebration of Twice's first anniversary since debut on October 20, the group unveiled their new song "One in a Million" from their upcoming third EP, Twicecoaster: Lane 1, through a live broadcast on V Live. Twicecoaster: Lane 1 and the music video of pop dance song "TT" were released online on October 24. In Korea, the album recorded more than 165,000 physical copies sold on the Gaon Chart within a week, exceeding the five-month sales of the group's previous release Page Two in only seven days. Eventually, Twicecoaster: Lane 1 became the bestselling K-pop girl group album for 2016, selling 350,852 copies at year-end. Its lead single "TT" became one of the best-performing songs in 2016, claiming the top spot of the Gaon Digital Chart for four consecutive weeks and becoming the best-performing single in South Korea for the month of November. Internationally, the group's third EP debuted at number 3 on the Billboard World Albums chart, marking their first Top 5 entry, with the album's lead single "TT" debuting at number 2 on the Billboard World Digital Song Sales chart. "TT" then became the first music video by a K-pop female act to surpass 200 million views on May 25, 2017.

On November 11, the music video for their debut single "Like Ooh-Ahh" hit 100 million views on YouTube, making Twice the fourth K-pop girl group to reach 100 million views, as well as the first K-pop group to reach this milestone with a debut music video. On November 19, Twice's "Cheer Up" won Song of the Year at the 8th Melon Music Awards. It was then followed by another Song of the Year award at the 18th Mnet Asian Music Awards on December 2.

=== 2017: First concert tour and debut in Japan ===
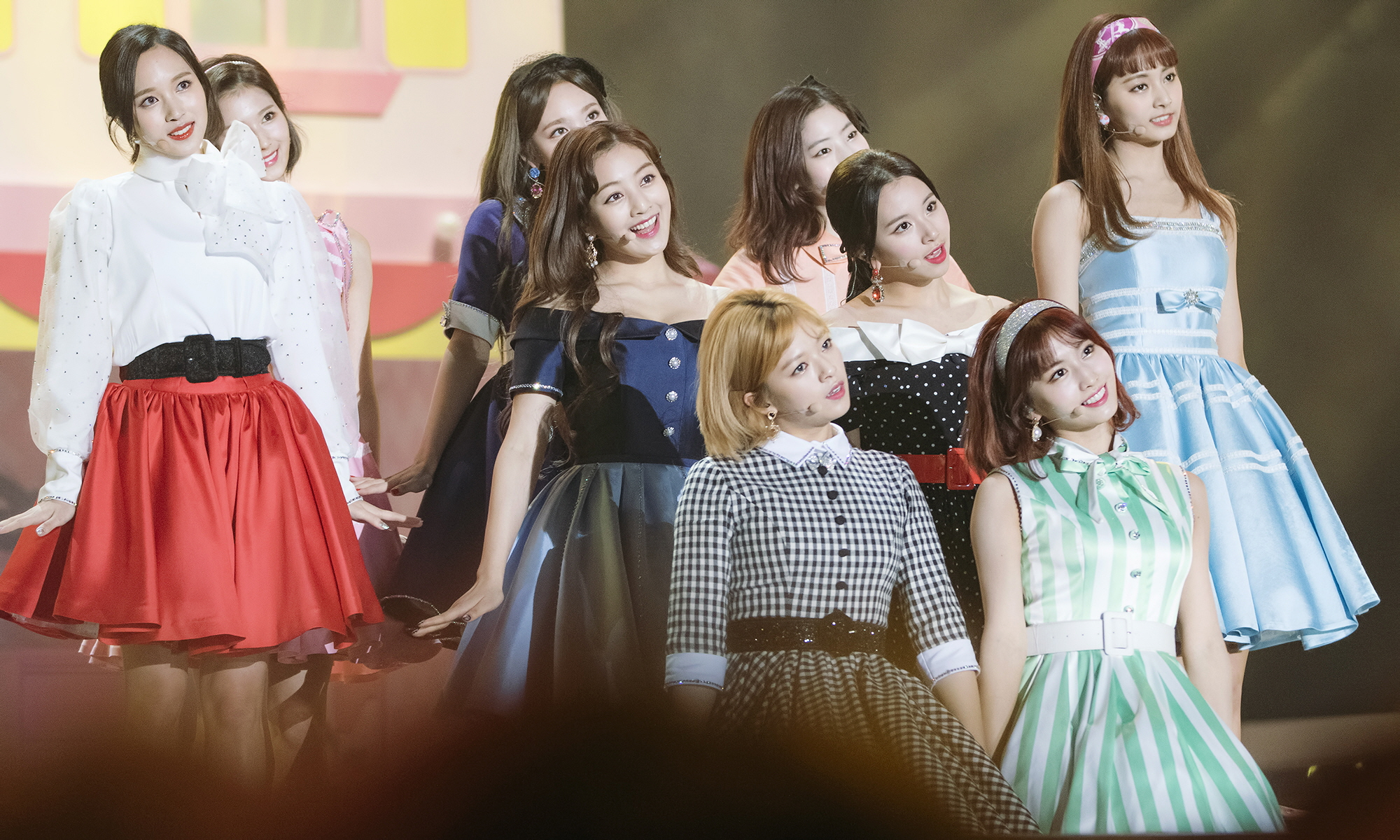
Twice performing at the 2017 Melon Music Awards

On January 10, JYPE announced Twice's first solo concert tour within just a year and four months after debuting in October 2015. The three-day sold-out concert titled "Twice 1st Tour: Twiceland – The Opening" was held on February 17–19 at the SK Olympic Handball Gymnasium. A tour across Thailand and Singapore was also held after the first stop in Seoul. After the Korean leg of the concert tour, Twice released a special album on February 20 titled Twicecoaster: Lane 2, along with its lead single, "Knock Knock". The album was a reissue of Twicecoaster: Lane 1. The album debuted atop the Gaon Album Chart and charted at number four on the Billboard World Albums chart, selling 266,645 copies by the end of February. Its lead single "Knock Knock" debuted atop the Gaon Digital Chart, and peaked at numbers 5 and 15 on the World Digital Song Sales and Japan Hot 100, respectively.

Twice launched their Japanese website and social media channels in early February. On February 24, they officially announced their Japanese debut with a compilation album titled #Twice which was set to be released on June 28. On May 15, Twice released their fourth EP titled Signal with the lead track of the same name, produced by Park Jin-young. This marked the group's first collaboration with Park. The EP contains six tracks, including "Eye Eye Eyes" co-written by members Jihyo and Chaeyoung, and "Only You" written by former Wonder Girls member Ha:tfelt. Signal debuted atop the Gaon Album Chart on the first week of its release, while also entering the Billboard World Albums chart at number three. The album also entered the Billboard Heatseekers Albums Chart, debuting at number 11. By the end of May, it was reported to be the second best-selling album in South Korea for the month, recording sales of 248,550 copies. Meanwhile, the album's eponymous lead single debuted atop the Gaon Digital Chart and the Billboard K-pop Hot 100, and at number three on the Billboard World Digital Song Sales chart. With the commercial success of Signal, it was reported that Twice had reached cumulative sales of over 1 million copies of their five albums, achieving the feat in just one year and seven months after debuting.

On June 14, Twice digitally released "Signal (Japanese ver.)", along with the short version of its music video as a preview and countdown to their Japanese debut album release. One week later, they released the full music video of the Japanese version of "TT". They officially debuted in Japan with the release of #Twice on June 28. It consists of ten songs, including both Korean and Japanese-language versions of their first five singles. On July 2, Twice held their two-part debut showcase titled "Touchdown in Japan" at Tokyo Metropolitan Gymnasium, attended by a total of 15,000 people. #Twice debuted at number 2 on Oricon Albums Chart with 136,157 copies sold within seven days since its release. The commercial success of Twice's debut Japanese album was reported to have the highest first-week album sales by a Korean artist in Japan in two years. Less than two months after the album's release, it recorded sales of over 260,000 copies. On October 6, the group released the music video for their first Japanese single, "One More Time", ahead of its official release on October 18. Selling over 130,000 copies by the second day of its release, the single achieved the biggest first-day sales and became the fastest-selling release of any South Korean girl group in Japan. Both #Twice and "One More Time" earned platinum certifications from the Recording Industry Association of Japan (RIAJ). The RIAJ certifications earned by the group for #Twice and "One More Time" made them the first Korean girl group to earn a platinum certification in Japan for both a single and an album in the same year. "TT (Japanese ver.)", the digital single from #Twice, also earned an RIAJ gold certification for selling 100,000 downloads. #Twice and "TT (Japanese ver.)" then won Album of the Year and Song of the Year by Download for the Asian Region at the 32nd Japan Gold Disc Awards.

Twice released their first full-length Korean album, Twicetagram, on October 30 with its lead single titled "Likey". The music video for the song was filmed in Canada in early September. "Likey" was composed by Black Eyed Pilseung and Jeon Gun, becoming the group's fourth collaboration with Black Eyed Pilseung. Several composers and songwriters participated in the making of this album, including the Korean members of Twice as lyricists and former Wonder Girls member Hyerim, who co-composed the eighth track titled "Look at Me". The album and its lead single debuted atop both Billboard's World Albums and World Digital Song Sales respectively—the group's first number one on both charts, making Twice the first female K-pop act to simultaneously top both Billboard charts. They also rose on the Heatseekers Albums chart as the album debuted at number 10, one position higher than Signal's peak at number 11.

The Christmas-inspired reissue of Twicetagram, titled Merry & Happy, along with its lead single "Heart Shaker" was released on December 11, 2017. The album and its lead single "Heart Shaker" debuted at No. 1 on four charts of Gaon—Album Chart and Digital Chart, Download Chart and Social Chart respectively, while the holiday track "Merry & Happy" entered and peaked at No. 24 on the Gaon Digital Chart.

Twice's successful debut in Japan led them to rank third in the Top Artist category of Billboard Japan's 2017 Year-End Rankings. Twice then performed at 68th Kōhaku Uta Gassen, the top-rated annual year-end musical show in Japan produced by NHK, which marked the first time a Korean artist appeared on the show since 2011.

=== 2018: Continued success and touring ===
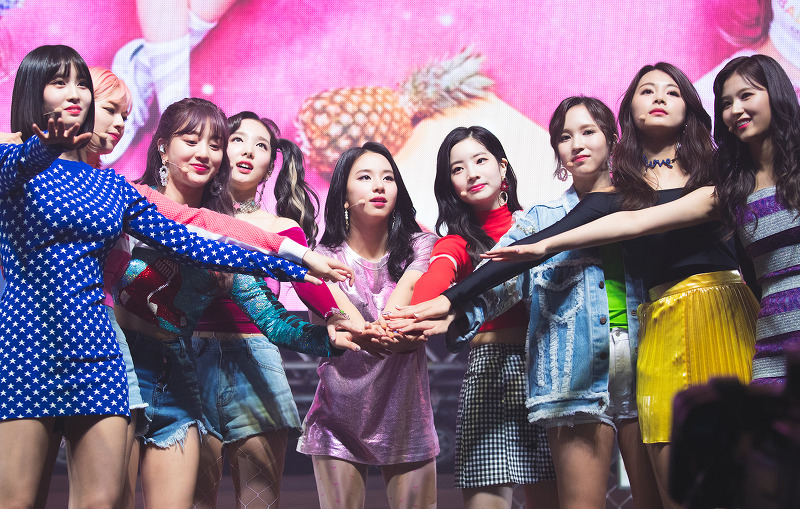
Twice at a showcase for What Is Love? in April 2018

Twice's second Japanese single titled "Candy Pop" was released on February 7, 2018. The single sold 303,746 copies in its first week and topped the Japan Hot 100 chart, while also becoming their second single to earn a platinum certification from the RIAJ. The group also embarked on their first concert tour in Japan titled Twice Showcase Live Tour 2018 "Candy Pop", starting on January 19, 2018, in the Aichi Prefecture. On April 9, they released their fifth EP, What Is Love?, with the single of the same name produced by Park Jin-young. The EP sold 335,235 copies in the first month and made Twice become the first female artist and the fifth act to earn a platinum certification by the Korea Music Content Association (KMCA), for selling over 250,000 copies. Twice's third Japanese single, "Wake Me Up", was released on May 16, and became the first physical single by a foreign female artist to be certified double platinum by the RIAJ. Their second headline tour titled "Twice 2nd Tour: Twiceland Zone 2 – Fantasy Park" began in Seoul on May 18–20. By its conclusion, the group's concert tour had attracted over 90,000 fans in six cities across Asia.

Twice performed a cover of The Jackson 5's "I Want You Back" as the theme song to the Japanese film adaptation of Sensei Kunshu. The song was released as a digital single on June 15, along with the music video. A second version of the music video featuring the cast of the film was released on June 26. On July 9, an expanded reissue of What Is Love? named Summer Nights, along with its lead single "Dance the Night Away", was released. The single surpassed 100 million streams and sold 2,500,000 downloads on Gaon Music Chart, earning the group its first platinum single certification for both streaming and download, and making Twice the second act to earn a platinum certification for streaming, download and album by the KMCA since certifications were introduced in April 2018.

On September 12, Twice released their first Japanese studio album, BDZ. Its lead single of the same name was pre-released as a digital single on August 17. BDZ debuted at number 1 on the daily ranking of Oricon Albums Chart with 89,721 units sold, setting a record for the highest first day sales of albums released by a Korean girl group in Japan. It also topped the weekly ranking with 181,069 units sold, making Twice the fifth foreign female artist in Oricon history to top both the weekly singles and albums chart. The release of the album was followed with their concert tour named Twice 1st Arena Tour 2018 "BDZ", beginning in Chiba on September 29. The studio album was certified platinum by the RIAJ, making it the group's fifth consecutive platinum certification in Japan. Twice released their sixth EP, Yes or Yes, on November 5, with the lead single of the same name. The music video of "Yes or Yes" achieved 31.4 million views on YouTube within the first 24 hours, becoming the seventh-biggest 24-hour YouTube debut of all time.

On December 12, Twice released a special album titled The Year of "Yes", along with its lead single "The Best Thing I Ever Did", as a reissue of Yes or Yes. The group also released a repackage of BDZ with "Stay by My Side", the theme song of the Japanese television drama Shinya no Dame Koi Zukan, on December 26. "Stay by My Side" was released as a digital single on October 22, along with a behind-the-scenes video showing Twice recording the song.

=== 2019: Fancy You, Feel Special, and &Twice ===
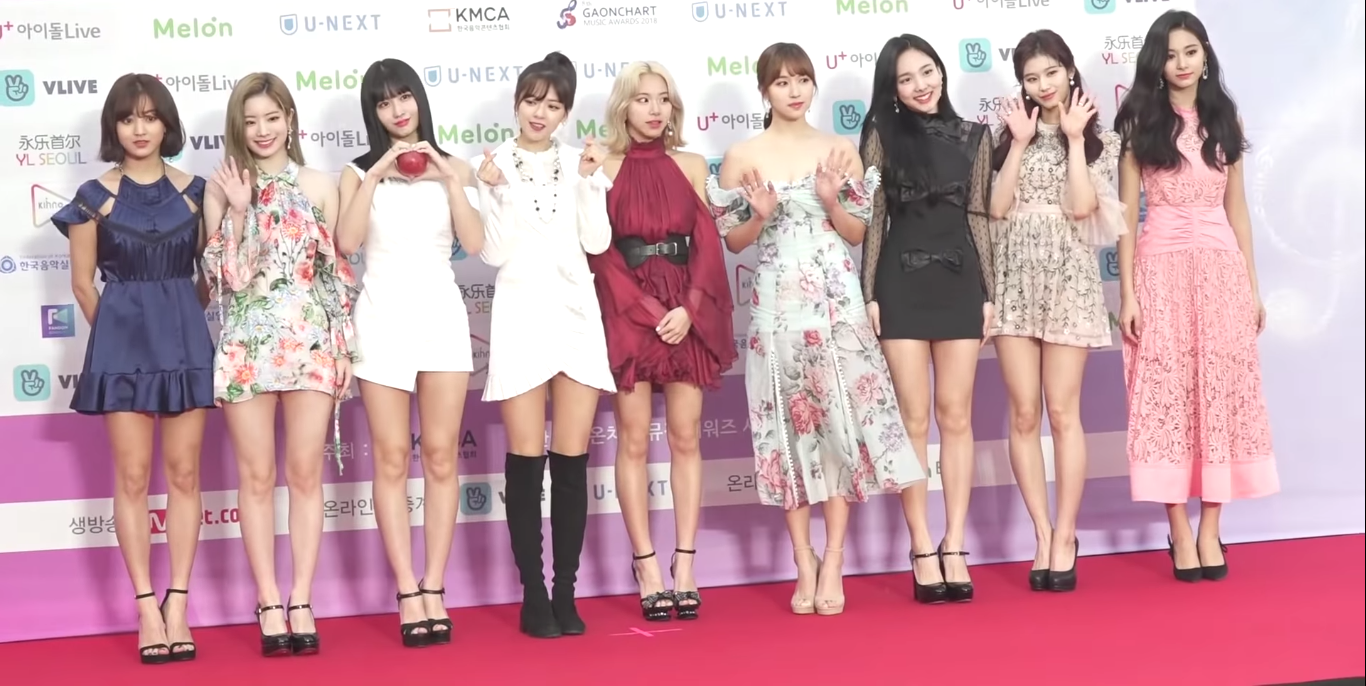
Twice at the 2019 Gaon Chart Music Awards

On March 6, 2019, the group released their second Japanese compilation album #Twice2. The album debuted at number 1 on the daily ranking of the Oricon Albums Chart with 95,825 units sold, breaking the group's own record of the highest first day album sales for K-pop girl groups in Japan. It then became the first album by a foreign female artist to sell more than 200,000 albums in the first week since Kara's Super Girl in 2011.

Twice became the first female K-pop act to hold a Japanese dome tour with Twice Dome Tour 2019 "#Dreamday", held from March to April 2019. The tour garnered a total audience of 220,000 during five shows in Osaka, Tokyo and Nagoya, with tickets selling out within one minute.

On April 22, they released their seventh EP Fancy You. The music video for "Fancy", which garnered over 42.1 million views in a single day, also reached the seventh position in the list of YouTube's biggest debuts during the first 24 hours. Recording 314,323 copies sold on April 25, the release of Fancy You saw Twice exceeding a total of over 3.75 million album copies sold from their twelve Korean releases. Following the release of the album, the group embarked on their first world tour titled "Twicelights" which was first held at a sold-out KSPO Dome in Seoul on May 25–26. Twicelights marked the group's first solo concert tour held in the United States, with the North American leg of their tour recording over 41,000 people in attendance.

On June 12, Twice released two Japanese digital singles, "Happy Happy" and "Breakthrough". On the release day of the digital singles, "Happy Happy" was also released physically, followed by "Breakthrough" a week later. Both singles received a platinum certification from the RIAJ. On July 17, JYP Entertainment announced that the group will hold an additional Japanese tour leg after reaching tens of thousands of fans on the Southeast Asia and North America legs of their Twicelights World Tour. They staged twelve concerts in seven Japanese cities from October 2019 to February 2020.

Twice released their eighth EP, Feel Special, on September 23, along with the music video for the lead single of the same name produced by Park Jin-young. The single scored the group's second number one entry on the Billboard World Digital Song Sales chart. "Feel Special" also increased Twice's popularity across North America, as the single debuted on the Canadian Hot 100 at number 82. The group's first entry made Twice the third K-pop girl group and ninth K-pop act to appear on this chart. Recording sales of over 151,000 copies on September 30, Twice broke their own first-week album sales record with Feel Special.

Twice released their second Japanese studio album &Twice on November 20, which included the group's earlier released singles "Happy Happy" and "Breakthrough". The album's lead single "Fake & True" was pre-released as a digital single on October 18. &Twice debuted at number 1 on the daily ranking of the Oricon Albums Chart with 80,563 copies sold, before going on to top the weekly Oricon Albums Chart with 124,197 copies sold.

In 2019, Twice sold over one million albums on Gaon, achieving this feat for the third consecutive year. In Japan, Twice surpassed 5 billion yen worth of record sales in 2019. The group was the bestselling foreign artist and ranked fourth overall in the Artist Sales category of the 52nd Oricon Annual Ranking. On Billboard Japan, Twice ranked fifth in the Top Artist category of the 2019 year-end rankings, becoming the group's third consecutive year of ranking within the top five. The group also became the fifth most-streamed act on Spotify in the country.

=== 2020: US promotions, More and More, and Eyes Wide Open ===
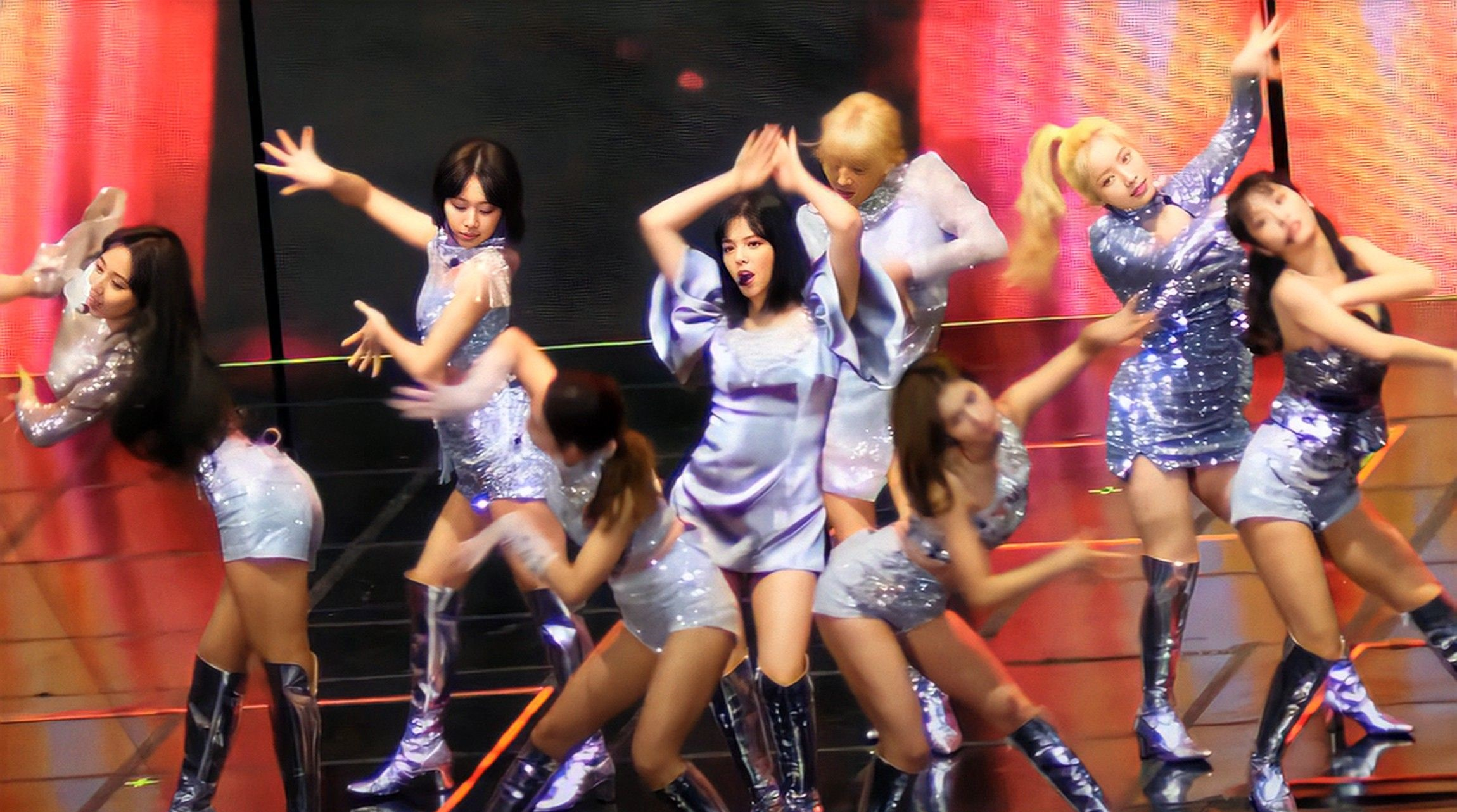
Twice performing at the 2020 Golden Disc Awards

In October 2019, JYP Entertainment announced that the group has added two stops to their world tour "Twicelights" at the Tokyo Dome. The additional concerts were initially scheduled to be held on March 3–4, 2020, with tickets being sold out within three minutes. However, due to concerns regarding the COVID-19 pandemic, the Tokyo concerts were postponed and scheduled on April 15–16, but was eventually canceled altogether. An encore of the tour called the "Twicelights World Tour Finale" was also initially set to be held in Seoul on March 7 and 8, 2020 at the KSPO Dome but was eventually canceled due to the COVID-19 pandemic. On February 24, it was announced that the group had signed with Republic Records for promotion in the United States as part of JYP Entertainment's partnership with the label. The documentary series Twice: Seize the Light first premiered on April 29 through YouTube Originals, which features nine episodes that follow the group's members throughout their journey as trainees to their first world tour "Twicelights". Their ninth Korean EP, More & More, was released on June 1 with a lead single of the same name. A month after its release, the EP recorded over 563,000 sales on Gaon, making it not only Twice's bestselling album to date but also setting a record for having the highest sales volume for a girl group in Gaon Chart history. The EP debuted at number 200 on the Billboard 200, making Twice the fifth South Korean girl group to enter the chart, after Girls' Generation-TTS, Girls' Generation, 2NE1 and Blackpink. Twice also entered the Billboard Artist 100 for the first time, debuting at number 96.

On July 8, Twice released their sixth Japanese single, "Fanfare", which earned a platinum certification from the RIAJ. On August 9, the group held their first online concert titled "Twice: World in a Day" in response to their "Twicelights World Tour Finale" which had been canceled earlier in the year. The group worked with the Beyond Live platform launched by SM Entertainment and Naver for the concert, becoming the first artist outside of SM Entertainment to host an online concert using the platform.

On September 16, Twice released their third Japanese compilation album #Twice3, which became their seventh number 1 album on the Oricon Albums Chart, making Twice the second foreign female artist to achieve the feat following South Korean singer BoA. The group released their second Korean studio album, Eyes Wide Open, on October 26 with the lead single titled "I Can't Stop Me". Two months later after the release of Eyes Wide Open, the album debuted at number 72 on the US Billboard 200, marking the group's highest entry on the chart surpassing More & More, as well as making Twice only the third K-pop girl group to break within the top 100 of the chart, after 2NE1 and Blackpink.

Twice then collaborated with the virtual girl group K/DA, with members Nayeon, Sana, Jihyo, and Chaeyoung being featured on the song "I'll Show You" as part of K/DA's first EP All Out released on November 6. The group's four members performed the song alongside American singer-songwriters Bekuh Boom and Annika Wells. Following this, Twice released their seventh Japanese single titled "Better" on November 11 for digital download and streaming, featuring "Scorpion" as a B-side, and was then released physically on November 18. The single debuted at number 3 on the Billboard Japan Hot 100 recording 93,548 unit sales on November 16–22. The group then made their US television debut with their appearance on the "#PlayAtHome" series of The Late Show with Stephen Colbert on November 30, performing their song "I Can't Stop Me".

On December 1, it was reported that Twice had reached cumulative sales of over 5.81 million albums on Gaon. Taking into consideration the group's sales in Japan, Twice had exceeded 10 million album copies sold in both countries. During their appearance at the 2020 Mnet Asian Music Awards on December 6, Twice gave a surprise performance of their unreleased track titled "Cry for Me" which was described by the group as a present for their fans, and after high demand, the song was officially released as a digital single on December 18. The song debuted atop the Billboard World Digital Song Sales Chart on the chart dated January 2, 2021, and also became the group's third entry on the Billboard Global Excluding US Chart debuting at #122.

=== 2021–2022: International expansion and fourth world tour, "III" ===
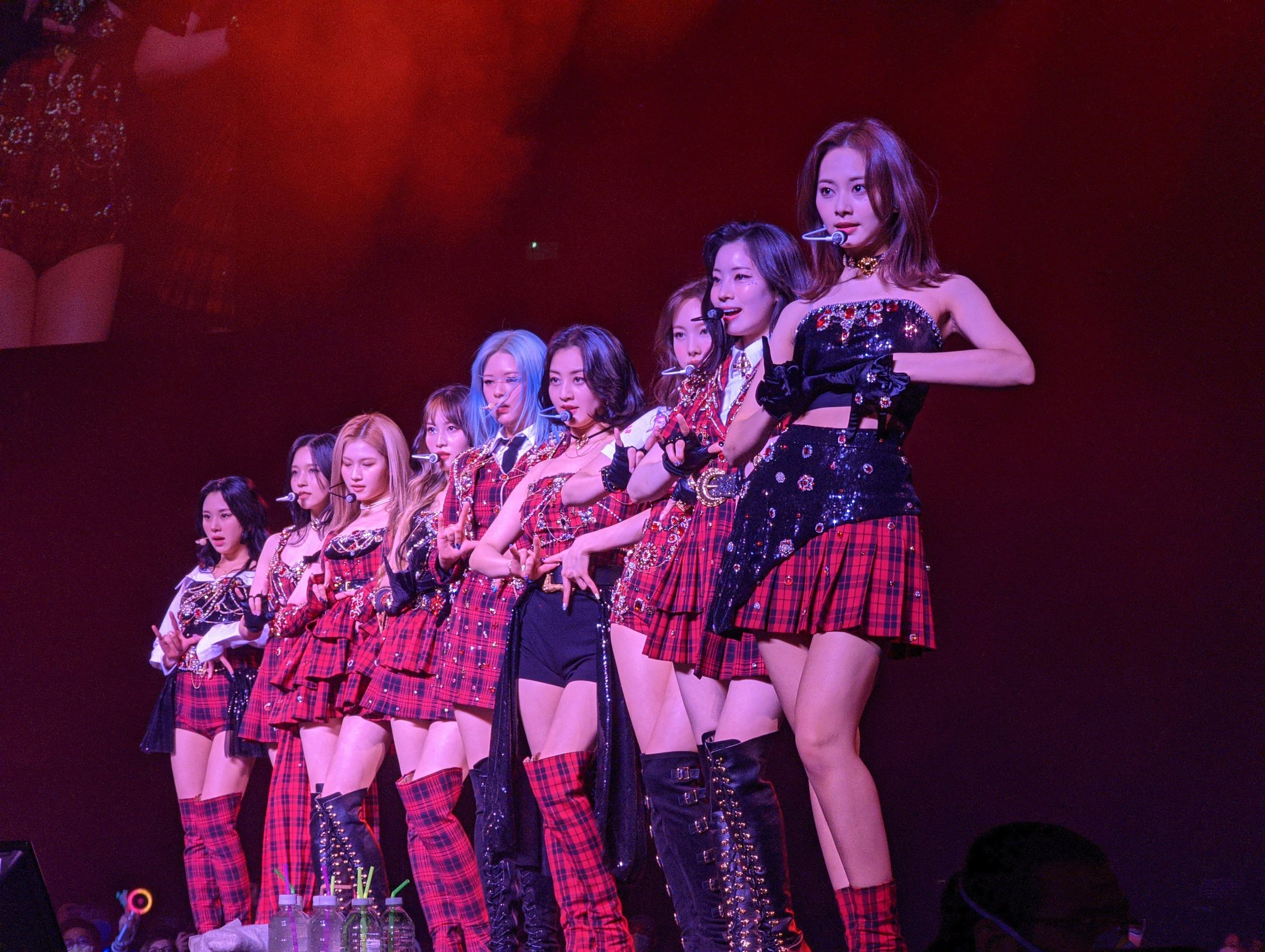
Twice performing at The Forum in Inglewood, California on February 15, 2022

On January 28, 2021, Twice made an appearance on the Time 100 Talks series held by Time magazine via livestream broadcast, with the group delivering a special performance of their track "Depend On You" from their Eyes Wide Open album.

On March 6, the group held their second online concert titled "Twice in Wonderland", which was first announced on January 14. The concert was held in partnership with NTT Docomo and was broadcast using various technologies including AR (augmented reality) and MR (mixed reality). At the end of their online concert, Twice announced the release of their upcoming Japanese single "Kura Kura" to be slated on May 12. "Kura Kura" was pre-released on online streaming platforms on April 20. Its music video was also released on the same date.

On April 28, Twice appeared on The Kelly Clarkson Show with a performance of their single "Cry for Me". The group's tenth Korean EP, Taste of Love, was released on June 11. "Alcohol-Free", the EP's lead single, was pre-released on June 9, along with its music video. After the release of the music video, the number of YouTube views exceeded 20 million in just 24 hours. In the week ending June 17, Taste of Love debuted at number 6 on the Billboard 200, becoming Twice's first top 10 album in the United States with 46,000 album-equivalent units earned. Of that sum, the EP recorded 43,000 physical sales, making it the best selling album in the US for the week. With this, Twice became the first female Korean act to chart an EP within the top ten of the Billboard 200, and just the second female Korean act to have a top 10 album in the chart.

On July 28, the group released their third Japanese studio album, Perfect World, which includes the lead single of the same name. The group released their first official all-English single, "The Feels", on October 1. At the end of the single's music video, their third Korean studio album (sixth overall) and fourth world tour were teased. On October 11, "The Feels" debuted at number 83 on the Billboard Hot 100, marking the group's first appearance on the chart. The song also made its way to the UK Singles Chart, where it peaked at number 80. The group's third Korean studio album, Formula of Love: O+T=<3, was released on November 12 with its lead single, "Scientist". The album peaked at number 3 on the Billboard 200, breaking Taste of Love's record.

On November 15, the group announced five initial North American tour dates of their fourth world tour, "III". They embarked on the tour with a two-day concert in Seoul on December 25–26. On December 3, Twice pre-released their ninth Japanese single, "Doughnut", with an accompanying music video. It was physically released on December 15 in Japan. On March 16, 2022, they released their fourth Japanese compilation album #Twice4, which became their eighth number 1 album on the Oricon Albums Chart, making Twice the first foreign female artist to achieve this feat.

With the successful completion of their seven-date U.S. leg of the "III" World Tour which concluded on February 27, 2022, Twice became the first female K-pop act to hold two separate arena tours in the world's biggest music market, bringing out an audience of approximately 100,000 people. Originally, only one date for Los Angeles and New York was announced, but second shows were quickly added to both cities added due to high demand after the sellout. Following the success of their US tour, Twice announced an encore concert at the Banc of California Stadium in Los Angeles, making them the first female K-pop group to headline a stadium concert in the United States. Initially announcing only one date for May 14, the group decided to hold an additional performance on May 15 following high demand. In addition, the group was scheduled to hold their Tokyo Dome concert in Japan for two days on April 23 and 24, but as the tickets were sold out at the same time as the opening sale, they added a performance on the 25th. With three sold-out dates at the Tokyo Dome, Twice became the first K-pop girl group and the second girl group overall (following AKB48) to hold a three-day concert at the said venue.

=== 2022–2024: Contract renewal and "Ready to Be" tour ===
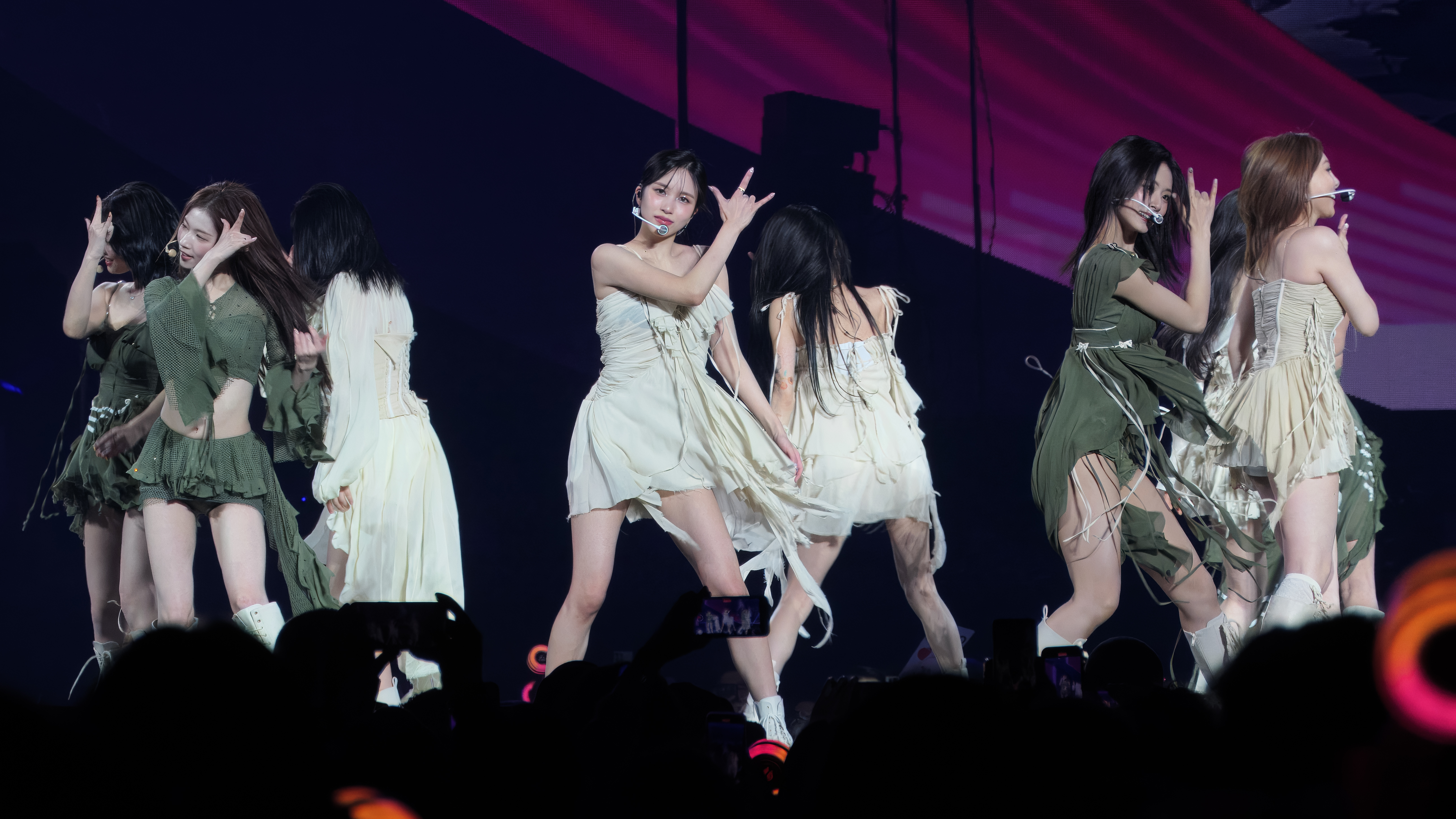
Twice performing at Allegiant Stadium during their Ready to Be World Tour

On July 12, 2022, all members of Twice renewed their contracts with JYP Entertainment. The group's fourth Japanese studio album, Celebrate, was released on July 27 to commemorate the fifth anniversary of their debut in Japan. Its lead single of the same name was pre-released as a digital single on July 15. On August 26, Twice released their eleventh Korean EP, Between 1&2, and its lead single, "Talk That Talk". Between 1&2 was Twice's first album to sell one million copies, and the group surpassed 14 million cumulative album sales by the end of the year.

On January 20, 2023, Twice released a pre-release English single, "Moonlight Sunrise", ahead of their twelfth Korean EP, Ready to Be. The EP and its lead single, "Set Me Free", were released on March 10. Ready to Be had 1.7 million pre-order sales and is Twice's bestselling album to date. The group embarked on their fifth world tour, "Ready to Be", with a two-day concert in Seoul on April 15–16. On May 31, Twice released their tenth Japanese single, "Hare Hare", which was created for their first stadium concerts in Japan. With four sold-out dates at Yanmar Stadium Nagai and Ajinomoto Stadium, Twice became the first K-pop girl group to hold a concert at a stadium in Japan. The North American leg of the "Ready to Be" World Tour concluded on July 9, and included sold-out concerts at SoFi Stadium and MetLife Stadium, a first for any K-pop girl group. They released the single "Dance Again", also featured in their television commercial for FamilyMart in Japan, on December 12.

On February 2, 2024, Twice released the single "I Got You". The song serves as the pre-release single from their thirteenth Korean EP, With You-th, which was released on February 23 along with the lead single "One Spark". The group released their fifth Japanese studio album, Dive, on July 17. That same month, they concluded the "Ready to Be" World Tour with a series of special concerts in Japan, becoming the first foreign female artist to headline a concert at Nissan Stadium. The tour was their largest yet, with 51 shows in 27 cities across Asia, North America, South America, Oceania, and Europe, and 1.5 million attendees in total.

On October 20, Twice held a fan meeting titled "Home 9round" to commemorate the ninth anniversary of their debut. During the event, they performed the unreleased track "Sweetest Obsession" and announced their fourteenth EP, Strategy, which was released on December 6. On October 25, Twice was featured on a remix of Megan Thee Stallion's "Mamushi". In turn, Megan Thee Stallion featured on Strategy's lead single, "Strategy". On November 21, Twice became the first K-pop artist to headline Amazon Music Live, with their performance having the most unique viewers of any Amazon Music production to date on both Twitch and Prime Video. They released "The Wish", their second single to be featured in a FamilyMart television commercial, on December 16.

=== 2025–present: This Is For and departures from JYP ===
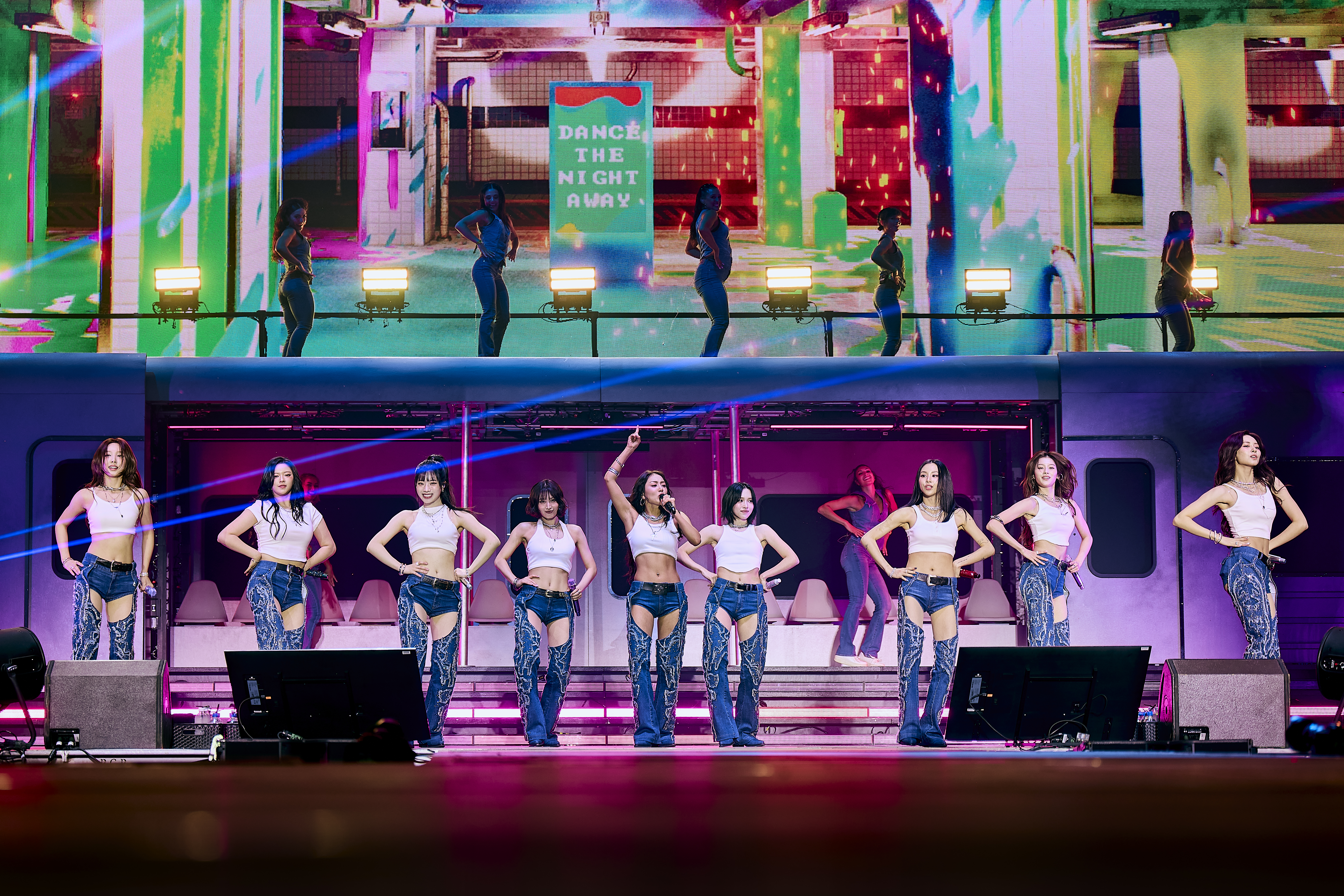
Twice during their headlining performance at Lollapalooza in 2025

In April 2025, Twice opened all six shows of Coldplay's Music of the Spheres World Tour in Seoul as the special guest. They also joined Coldplay on stage to perform a new version of "We Pray", which was released on April 17. Twice released their fifth Japanese compilation album #Twice5 on May 14. Members Jeongyeon, Jihyo and Chaeyoung performed the end credits version of "Takedown" for the Netflix film KPop Demon Hunters, released on June 20. On July 11, Twice released their fourth Korean studio album, This Is For, and its lead single of the same name. In support of the album, they embarked on the This Is For World Tour with a two-day concert in Incheon on July 19–20. On August 2, Twice became the first K-pop girl group to headline the Lollapalooza music festival in Chicago. They released their sixth Japanese studio album, Enemy, on August 27. To commemorate the tenth anniversary of their debut, Twice released the album Ten: The Story Goes On and its lead single "Me+You" on October 10. Members Nayeon, Jihyo, Momo, and Tzuyu headlined the Victoria's Secret Fashion Show 2025 on October 15. The group also released the 10th anniversary documentary film One in a Mill10n on October 20.

Twice concluded the This Is For World Tour in July 2026 with a three-day concert in Seoul. The tour was their largest to date, with 81 shows in 44 cities across Asia, Oceania, North America, and Europe. The tour set a record for the highest overall attendance achieved by a K-pop girl group in North America, with 550,000 spectators. The group also had 640,000 attendees in Japan, including 240,000 in Tokyo's National Stadium, where Twice became the first foreign artist to hold a solo concert. In August 2026, Jeongyeon and Chaeyoung announced they had left JYP Entertainment for their solo careers, though still remaining as members of Twice. In October, Jihyo announced she was also departing from the company while remaining in the group.

== Artistry ==
Twice is most notable for their consistent employment of "cute" concepts which was further supported by the group's bubblegum pop sound, which was seen as a departure from the usual retro style of music that was seen in their predecessor labelmates and fellow girl groups Wonder Girls and Miss A. The group had come to develop a signature "color pop" sonic style described as a combination of rock, R&B, and hip hop coupled with notable hooks in their music. In the group's early years, teen pop represented their discography since teenagers were their target audience. Their "cheerful" musical base was employed alongside a colorful style in terms of the members' fashion. While they have gained notability for emphasizing their youthful image, Twice has since adopted a darker, more mature, and elegant style. This was first seen in 2019 with the release of "Fancy" and "Breakthrough", which saw the group perform more sensual choreography for the former while employing a brassier electro-pop sound in the latter. They have since experimented with EDM, synth-pop, and retro soul among others in their eighth EP Feel Special; tropical house, Latin pop, and new jack swing in their ninth EP More & More; retro-synth, dance-pop, Japanese city-pop, and contemporary R&B in their second Korean studio album Eyes Wide Open; and disco-pop, reggae-pop, and trap in their third Korean studio album Formula of Love: O+T=<3. In addition to the evolution of the group's sound, the members' participation in the creative process has also increased over the years. All nine members have been involved in the creation of the group's music, particularly lyrically, the most prolific songwriters of which being Dahyun, Jihyo, and Chaeyoung.

The group is also known for incorporating modern online culture into their musical releases and their corresponding music videos. For instance, their 2016 single "TT" is named after the crying emoticon which was imitated in the group's point choreography, while their 2017 track "Likey" lyrically alludes to Instagram culture and the struggles of maintaining a beautiful social media image. In the music video for their 2018 single "What Is Love?", the group referenced several movies including The Princess Diaries, Ghost, La Boum, Pulp Fiction, Romeo + Juliet, Love Letter, La La Land, and Leon: The Professional.

== Impact and legacy ==
Regarded as one K-pop's most influential groups, Clash called Twice "the K-pop industry's standard for girl groups since their 2015 debut". The group has since been said to have defined K-pop culture on a global scale. Chase McMullen from Beats Per Minute noted that Twice had "established perhaps just about the strongest girl group discography in K-pop", and the group is regarded as one of the most bankable girl groups in Korean music history. Globally, they are one of the best-selling girl groups of all time. Called "undeniable global icons" by Nylon, the group's music has been credited as having defined an entire generation of K-pop. Forbes proclaimed them to be "juggernauts" in the music industry, pointing to their ability to sell out concerts at some of the world's largest stadiums; the group's dominance in the global music space has also been highlighted by organizations such as The Hollywood Reporter, Rolling Stone, Billboard, and The Recording Academy. They were called "The Biggest K-pop Group in the World" by Harper's Bazaar in 2020, and in 2024, Music Connection declared them to have "cemented themselves as one of the most successful K-pop groups of all time". After the worldwide success of the 2025 animated film KPop Demon Hunters, Director Maggie Kang named Twice as an inspiration for the fictional K-pop girl group Huntrix.

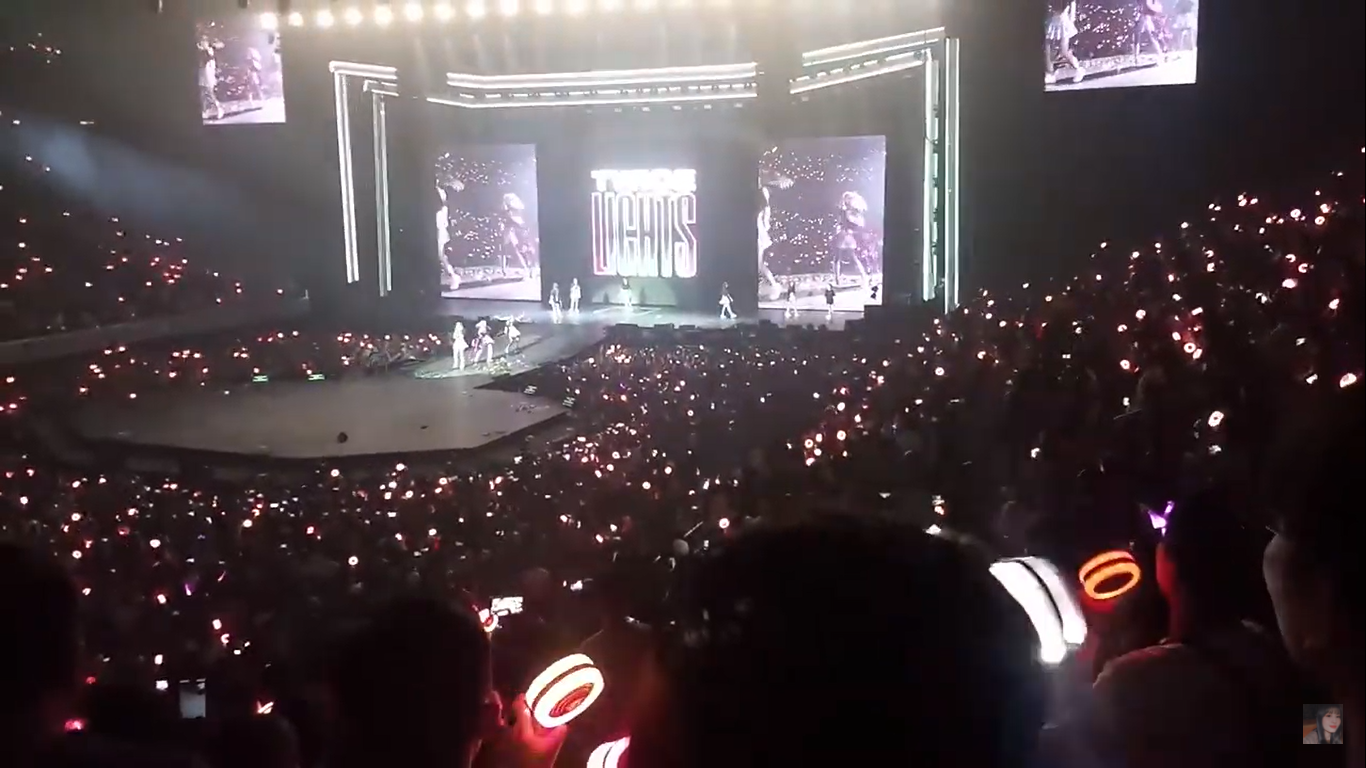
Twice performing in the Philippines in 2019 for their Twicelights World Tour

Twice have been well received in South Korea, deemed a "major force" in the industry, and called the "undisputed leader among idol girl groups", they ranked second in the top ten artists of the Gallup Korea survey for three consecutive years, making them the highest-ranking Korean group in 2016 and 2017, and the highest-ranking girl group in 2018. Since 2016, members regularly have placed in the top 20 of Gallup Korea's annual poll of the nation's favorite idols. In 2017, Twice was included in Forbes Korea Power Celebrity at third overall and first among recording artists. They entered within the top ten of the list again ranking third in 2018, and ninth in 2020. Twice has also been recognized for their brand recognition and marketing power, having topped the "Girl Group Brand Power Ranking" published by the Korean Corporate Reputation Research Institute several times. The group's success and domestic popularity was key in the rise of JYP Entertainment's stock, which increased in value by a factor of seven in less than three years; since the group's debut in 2015, prices rose from ₩4,500 to ₩31,400 in 2018. The group is also credited as among the key reasons for a significant increase in JYP Entertainment's market cap, from ₩1.33 trillion in 2021 to ₩2.24 trillion in 2022. During the 2017 South Korean presidential election, then-candidate Moon Jae-in from the Democratic party and candidate Yoo Seong-min from the Bareun party both used Twice's song "Cheer Up" with modified lyrics as their campaign jingles.

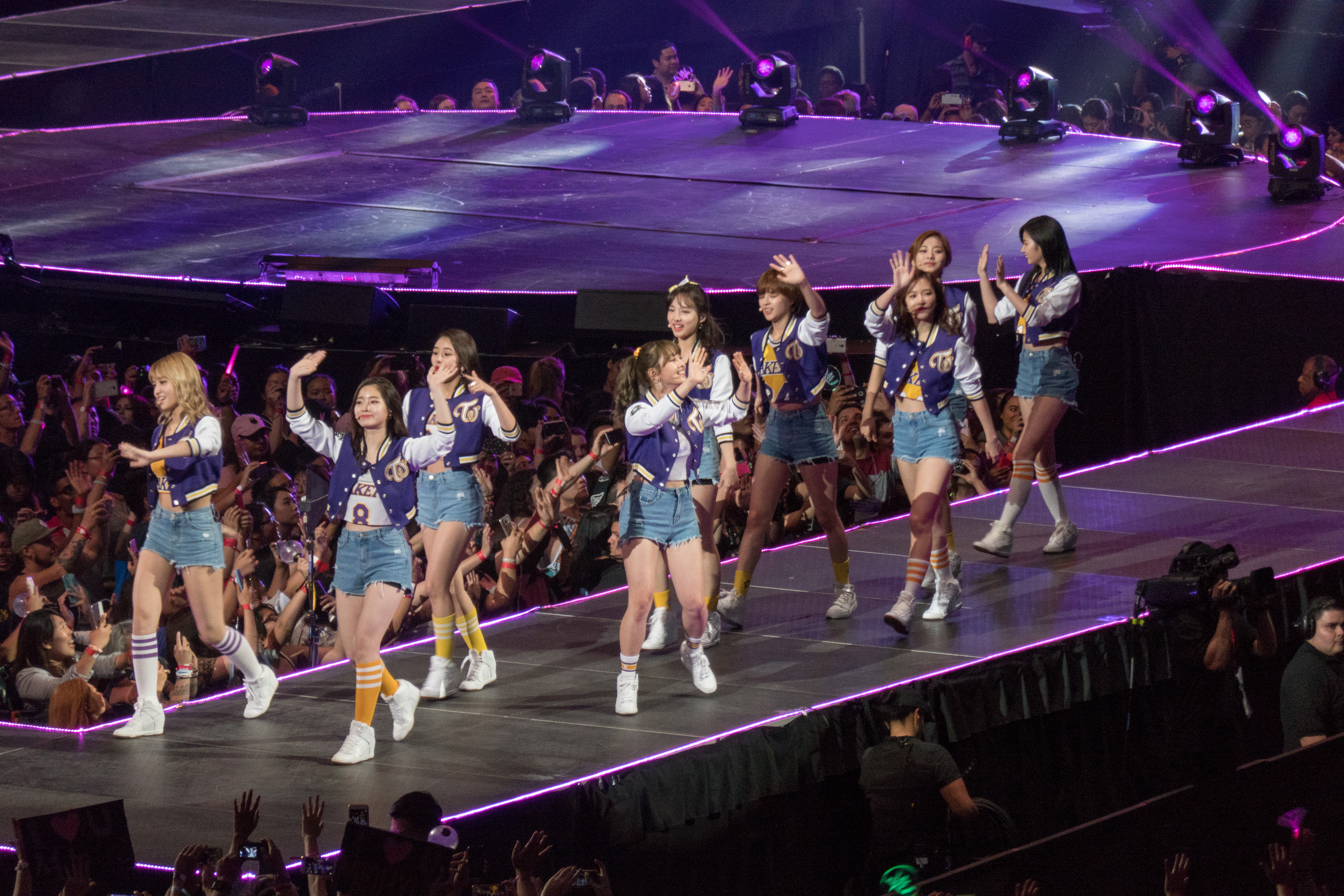
Twice performing at KCON LA in July 2016

Following their consecutive commercial successes in 2016 and 2017 Twice has since been dubbed by Korean media as the "Nation's Girl Group", being cited as a follow-up to previously successful girl groups Girls' Generation and Kara. Music critic Kang Tae-gyu has described Twice as being "one step ahead of the current period" among other girl groups from the same period of their debut. The group's commercial performance following their career breakthrough in 2016 was considered by the media to be 'remarkable' in an industry dominated by all-male music groups. Twice's distinctive point choreography—including for "Cheer Up" (2016), "TT" (2016) and "Signal" (2017)— became dance crazes and viral memes imitated by many celebrities in South Korea. In a survey conducted by media outlet Sports Chosun done in 2020 wherein representatives from several Korean entertainment agencies were surveyed on their choice for the top girl group, Twice was ranked at number 1 with 83 points, with agency officials citing the group's strong digital and physical sales alongside their pan-Asia success. A similar survey was conducted by media outlet Sports Seoul in the same year, with Twice also ranking at number 1 as the best female idol group among Korean entertainment industry officials with 111 points, citing the group's role in leading the re-emergence of girl groups in the Korean wave.

In Japan, the group's positive reputation and relatability amongst fans were attributed by local media to the presence of Japanese members Momo, Sana, and Mina who gained Twice fame in the country even before their debut. NHK News credited the group's commercial success with helping mend relations between Japan and South Korea. An example of Twice's popularity in Japan was seen after the release of their song "TT", in which the track's signature pose was imitated by several Japanese celebrities and idols including AKB48 and Nogizaka46. When Twice officially debuted in Japan through the release of their compilation album #Twice, the Tokyo Tower Observatory commemorated the event by displaying "TT" on the landmark—it was the first time that the Tokyo Tower had collaborated with an artist for a display, and was regarded as an unusual development by local media. Japanese newspaper Yomiuri Shimbun called Twice the "new protagonist in the dominance of Japan's Korean wave content market", while Korean press remarked that the group is "reigniting the heat of K-pop in Japan". Twice is one of two Korean acts that have been credited with leading a third "Hallyu" wave in Japan.

Internationally, Twice's notable bubblegum pop sound and distinctive choreography has led to the group receiving recognition by Time magazine as among the stand-out groups in K-pop. With much of K-pop's success in the United States being attributed to most Korean acts employing either hip-hop or EDM as their sonic base, Billboard has noted the success of Twice in making their bubblegum sound attract Western appeal, following the group's release of their song "Dance The Night Away". The South China Morning Post has named Twice as among three major female K-pop groups who are considered as "game-changers in a boy band-led industry", which was seen when Twice's eighth EP Feel Special became the bestselling girl group album in South Korea in 2019 and their feat of being the first Korean female group to hold a Japanese dome tour. The group's domestic and international success has led to Forbes magazine to include them in their "30 Under 30" list in 2020. Twice was also included in its Asia's inaugural "100 Digital Stars" list, which highlights personalities from the Asia-Pacific region with an established influence in social and digital media. The group was included in Bloomberg's Pop Star Power Rankings for the month of July 2020, ranking at number 12.

== Awards and achievements ==
Twice received its first award at the 2015 Mnet Asian Music Awards as Best New Female Artist, followed by another New Artist Award at the 2016 Golden Disc Awards.

In 2016, Twice won its first music program award with "Cheer Up" on the May 5 episode of M Countdown. The group also won several main and grand prize awards including Song of the Year with "Cheer Up" in two major music awards shows, Melon Music Awards and Mnet Asian Music Awards. Their second EP, Twicecoaster: Lane 1, was the fifth-highest-selling K-pop album of 2016 and the highest among girl groups. In 2017, "Signal" from their fourth extended play of the same name achieved Twice's second Song of the Year award at the 2017 Mnet Asian Music Awards, making them the first artist to consecutively win the grand prize. With a total of 36 music program trophies in 2017, Twice recorded the most wins received in a single year. Twice ranked second on Oricon's Breakout Artists of 2017 and became the first overseas female act to achieve a rookie triple crown on the 50th Oricon Annual Ranking. Twice also placed first in rookie artist total sales in 2017, with sales reaching 1.54 billion yen, as well as first-place among albums and singles for #Twice and "One More Time" respectively.

By May of the following year, they became the first artist to win seven consecutive Triple Crowns on Inkigayo. Twice received their third consecutive Song of the Year award at the 2018 Mnet Asian Music Awards with "What Is Love?" from their fifth extended play of the same name, making them the first group to win the award for three consecutive years. Twice topped the list of Korea's most popular music video on YouTube for two consecutive years with "Cheer Up" (2016) and "Knock Knock" (2017). In 2020, Twice became the K-pop girl group with the most music show wins totaling 106 wins as well as the fastest group to reach that number.

Twice was included in Variety's Youth Impact Report 2016—an annual list of young entertainers who have made an impact in the industry over the past year—at number 54 as the only K-pop group on the list. In 2017, Twice received the Minister of Culture, Sports and Tourism Commendation at the Korean Popular Culture and Arts Awards. They were then recognized as the only Asian act on Billboard's 21 Under 21 2017: Music's Next Generation, an annual ranking that highlights some of the world's most powerful young voices across various music genres.

In 2021, Twice's tenth extended play, Taste of Love, peaked at number-one on the Billboard Top Album Sales chart, making it the first EP from a girl group to do so. It was also the first EP from a girl group to enter the top 10 of the Billboard 200. On March 1, 2023, Twice was awarded the Breakthrough Artist at the 2023 Billboard Women in Music held in Los Angeles. This marks the first time a female K-Pop group has won this award. In 2025, Twice received the Prime Minister's Commendation at the Korean Popular Culture and Arts Awards. In May 2026 Twice won the award for Best Female K-Pop Artist at the 2026 American Music Awards held in Las Vegas, Nevada.

== Other ventures ==
=== Endorsements ===
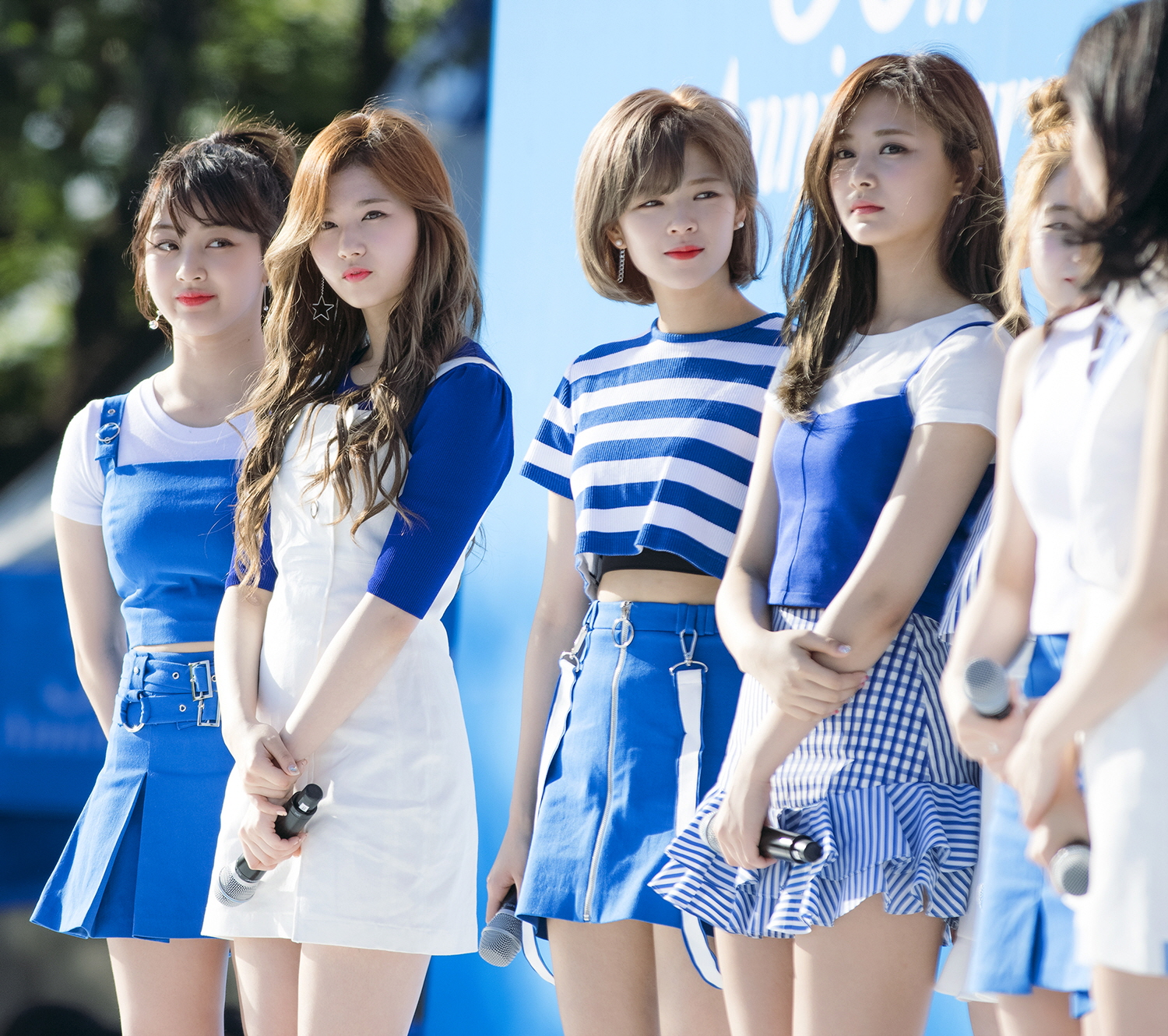
Twice at an event for Pocari Sweat in May 2017

Even before the official debut of Twice, the nine members had signed contracts as exclusive models for school uniform brand Skoolooks, alongside J. Y. Park. By December 2015, Twice had signed ten CF contracts, totaling earnings of ₩1.8 billion. By February 2017, they had one of the fastest growths in the advertising industry as the group's rate charged for endorsement hit ₩200 million for 6 months and ₩300 million for a year.

Twice is one of the celebrity endorsers of Lotte Duty Free. They also collaborated with shoe company Spris and created their own shoe brand called "Twice by Spris". In early 2017, Twice was selected by beverage maker Donga Otsuka to promote the company's flagship sports drink Pocari Sweat on its 30th anniversary. They became the first idol group to model for the brand. Pocari Sweat recorded ₩100 billion in sales for the first half of the year, a 10% increase over 2016's sales.

As of 2017, Twice has represented about 30 different brands including cosmetics, clothing, online and mobile games, food and beverages, credit cards, and more. Twice's first TV commercial in Japan for Ymobile was aired nationwide starting February 2, 2018, incorporating a pop arrangement of "Y.M.C.A." and Twice's signature "TT pose". In 2019, Twice was selected as South Korean ambassador of Estée Lauder. The group also became "Global Benchsetters" for Philippine clothing brand Bench. In March 2021, Kyungnam Pharmaceuticals announced that it had selected Twice as the representatives for its flagship vitamin brand Lemona. Later that year, Nintendo Korea launched a promotional campaign featuring Twice playing various Nintendo Switch video games. In August 2021, the group was chosen to perform for Shopee Philippines's 9.9 Super Shopping Day TV special that was held on September 9. On October 16, 2021, Scarlett Whitening, an Indonesian beauty brand known for its skin whitening products, introduced Twice as their brand ambassadors. The endorsement was, however, criticized by fans, calling JYP Entertainment to withdraw the deal as it would be "unethical" for Twice to endorse a brand with skin whitening products, "knowing that they have fans with darker skin complexions". In 2023, Filipino snack brand Oishi selected Twice as their endorsers. Kombucha brand Teazen named Twice as their new models for the brand on January 6, 2026.

=== Philanthropy ===
In February 2023, Twice donated ₩200 million (equivalent to ₩208.99 million or US$155,929.27 in 2025) to help with the 2023 Turkey–Syria earthquake through Save the Children. In December 2025, they donated HK$1 million (US$128,700.13) through Hong Kong World Vision to support children and families affected by the Wang Fuk Court fire.

== Members ==
- Nayeon (나연) – vocalist, dancer
- Jeongyeon (정연) – vocalist
- Momo (모모) – dancer, vocalist, rapper
- Sana (사나) – vocalist
- Jihyo (지효) – leader, vocalist
- Mina (미나) – dancer, vocalist
- Dahyun (다현) – rapper, vocalist
- Chaeyoung (채영) – rapper, vocalist
- Tzuyu (쯔위) – dancer, vocalist

=== Timeline ===
In July 2019, during the Twicelights World Tour, Mina took a break from activities due to her sudden extreme anxiety and insecurity problems in performing on stage. She rejoined the tour in a limited capacity in October, and fully resumed her activities in February 2020.

In October 2020, Jeongyeon took a break from all activities due to her anxiety disorder. She resumed her activities on January 31, 2021, at the 30th Seoul Music Awards. Between August–November 2021, Jeongyeon went on hiatus again due to panic and anxiety disorder.

Between October–December 2025, Chaeyoung suspended all activities due to health issues after she began experiencing vasovagal syncope. Between February–April 2026, Dahyun suspended all activities after sustaining a stress fracture in her ankle.

=== Sub-unit ===
In 2012, JYP was preparing to debut four Japanese girls, including Sana and Momo in Japan. However, due to the deterioration of the Korean-Japanese relationship, the project was suspended indefinitely. It resurfaced again in February 2023, with Sana, Momo, and Mina forming a sub-unit named MiSaMo. The trio released an original soundtrack titled "Bouquet" for TV Asahi's drama series Liaison: Kodomo no Kokoro Shinryōjo, before the release of their debut extended play of seven tracks, Masterpiece, on July 26, 2023.

== Discography ==
Korean albums

- Twicetagram (2017)
- Eyes Wide Open (2020)
- Formula of Love: O+T=<3 (2021)
- This Is For (2025)
- Ten: The Story Goes On (2025)

Japanese albums

- BDZ (2018)
- &Twice (2019)
- Perfect World (2021)
- Celebrate (2022)
- Dive (2024)
- Enemy (2025)

== Concerts and tours ==
=== Concert tours ===
- Twice 1st Tour: Twiceland – The Opening (2017)
- Twice Debut Showcase "Touchdown in Japan" (2017)
- Twice Showcase Live Tour 2018 "Candy Pop" (2018)
- Twice 2nd Tour: Twiceland Zone 2 – Fantasy Park (2018)
- Twice 1st Arena Tour 2018 "BDZ" (2018)
- Twice Dome Tour 2019 "#Dreamday" (2019)
- Twicelights World Tour (2019–2020)
- Twice 4th World Tour "III" (2021–2022)
- Ready to Be World Tour (2023–2024)
- This Is For World Tour (2025–2026)

=== Online concerts ===
- Twice: World in a Day (2020)
- Twice in Wonderland (2021)

== Filmography ==
- Twice: Seize the Light (2020)

== See also ==
- List of best-selling girl groups
