= Yes or Yes (song) =

Song recorded by South Korean girl group Twice

Single by Twice

from the EP Yes or Yes
- Language: Korean
- Released: November 5, 2018
- Genre: Pop; electropop
- Length: 3:57
- Label: JYP
- Composers: David Amber; Andy Love
- Lyricist: Sim Eun-jee

Twice single singles chronology
"BDZ" (2018)	"Yes or Yes" (2018)	"The Best Thing I Ever Did" (2018)

Music video
- "Yes or Yes" on YouTube

"Yes or Yes" (stylized as "YES or YES") is a song recorded by South Korean girl group Twice. It was released by JYP Entertainment on November 5, 2018, as the lead single from the group's sixth extended play, Yes or Yes.

== Background ==
In early October 2018, advertisements with the phrase "Do you like Twice? Yes or Yes" (Korean: "트와이스 좋아하세요? Yes or Yes") were put up on subway billboards, drawing attention online. On October 11, JYP Entertainment confirmed that Twice planned to release their third Korean album of the year on November 5. The lead single's name, "Yes or Yes", along with the album of the same name, were revealed on October 20 in a short clip which was part of a special video commemorating Twice's third anniversary.

To promote the song, JYP Entertainment released a set of three teasers, composed of three versions "Y", "E" and "S", on October 28, 29 and 30, respectively. The teasers feature connected content, introducing the viewers to a creepy forest where Jeongyeon drives a car toward "Twice Square". Then Mina appears, saying "Hey boy! Look, I'm gonna make this simple for you. You got two choices: Yes, or yes", and the members perform the song's dance. On November 3, another video was released previewing all tracks from the album, including "Yes or Yes".

== Composition ==
"Yes or Yes" was composed by David Amber and Andy Love, with lyrics by Sim Eun-jee. "Yes or Yes" was described as a bright and lively "color pop" song with influences from Motown, reggae and arena pop. Lyrically, it is about only being able to reply "yes" to a confession of love.

== Music video ==
The music video for the song was made by Naive; the team had already produced a number of music videos for Twice at the time. According to YouTube's official report, the video received 31.4 million views on the platform within the first 24 hours of release, the seventh most of all time. Additionally, Twice became the fastest K-pop girl group to reach 10 million views on YouTube, doing so in six hours and two minutes. The video reached 100 million views on December 14, the group's milestone tenth consecutive music video to surpass 100 million views. On April 12, 2021, the video hit 300 million views on YouTube. It reached 400 million views on January 7, 2024.

The video features strong choreography, showing nine girls facing their feelings by means of a fortune-telling crystal ball after the ride driven by Jeongyeon appears on the scene, with the girls dancing at the "Twice Square" fairground. Twice's members are dressed in '90s-inspired outfits, abundant with plaid, argyle and leather.

== Japanese version ==
On January 9, 2019, JYP Entertainment announced Twice's release of their second compilation album, #Twice2, for March 6. The album, containing ten tracks with both Korean and Japanese versions of five songs, includes "Yes or Yes". The lyrics were written by Yuka Matsumoto, as well as the songwriter of the Korean version of the song, Sim Eun-jee.

== Critical reception ==
Professional ratings
Review scores
Source	Rating
IZM	3/5 stars

Paper ranked "Yes or Yes" 11th on their list of the "Top 20 K-Pop Songs of 2018", with writer Jeff Benjamin calling the song a "pop gem" with "one of the year's gummiest earworms". He also highlighted how Twice "took control of what they wanted" in the lyrics, in contrast to their "sweeter" 2018 singles "What Is Love?" and "Dance the Night Away". Kim Ban-ya of IZM gave the song 3 out of 5 stars, praising JYP Entertainment for once again meeting the public's expectations for Twice and delivering "cute and catchy" music.

== Commercial performance ==
"Yes or Yes" debuted on top of the Gaon Digital Chart, becoming Twice's ninth consecutive number-one single. It also peaked at number 2 on the Billboard K-pop Hot 100, number 5 both on Billboard's World Digital Song Sales and Japan Hot 100 charts, and at number 14 on the Oricon Digital Singles chart.

The song surpassed 100 million streams in August 2019, becoming Twice's second single to be certified Platinum for streaming by the Korea Music Content Association (KMCA) since certifications were introduced in April 2018. "Yes or Yes" was certified Silver for streaming by the Recording Industry Association of Japan (RIAJ) after they introduced streaming certifications in April 2020. The song was subsequently certified Gold in November 2020 and Platinum in July 2022. In February 2026, it surpassed 200 million streams in Japan.

== Accolades ==
Year-end lists
Critic/Publication	List	Rank	Ref.
Paper Magazine	Top 20 K-Pop Songs of 2018	11	

Awards
Year	Award	Category	Result	Ref.
2019	8th Gaon Chart Music Awards	Artist of the Year – Digital Music (November)	Nominated	
2020	34th Golden Disc Awards	Digital Daesang	Nominated	
2020	34th Golden Disc Awards	Digital Bonsang	Won	

Music program awards
Program	Date	Ref.
Show Champion	November 14, 2018	
Show Champion	November 21, 2018	
M Countdown	November 15, 2018	
Inkigayo	November 19, 2018	

== Charts ==
=== Weekly charts ===
Weekly chart performance
Chart (2018)	Peak position
Japan (Japan Hot 100)	5
Japan Digital Singles (Oricon)	14
Malaysia (RIM)	17
Singapore (RIAS)	4
South Korea (Gaon)	1
South Korea (K-pop Hot 100)	2
US World Digital Song Sales (Billboard)	5

=== Year-end charts ===
2018 year-end chart performance for "Yes or Yes"
Chart (2018)	Position
South Korean (Gaon)	91

2019 year-end chart performance for "Yes or Yes"
Chart (2019)	Position
Japan (Japan Hot 100)	35
South Korea (Gaon)	47

== Certifications ==
Certifications
Region	Certification	Certified units/sales
South Korea (KMCA)	Platinum	2,500,000^{*}
Streaming
Japan (RIAJ)	Platinum	100,000,000^{†}
South Korea (KMCA)	Platinum	100,000,000^{†}
^{*} Sales figures based on certification alone.^{†} Streaming-only figures based on certification alone.

== See also ==
- List of certified songs in South Korea
- List of Gaon Digital Chart number ones of 2018
- List of M Countdown Chart winners (2018)
