= List of Gaon Digital Chart number ones of 2016 =

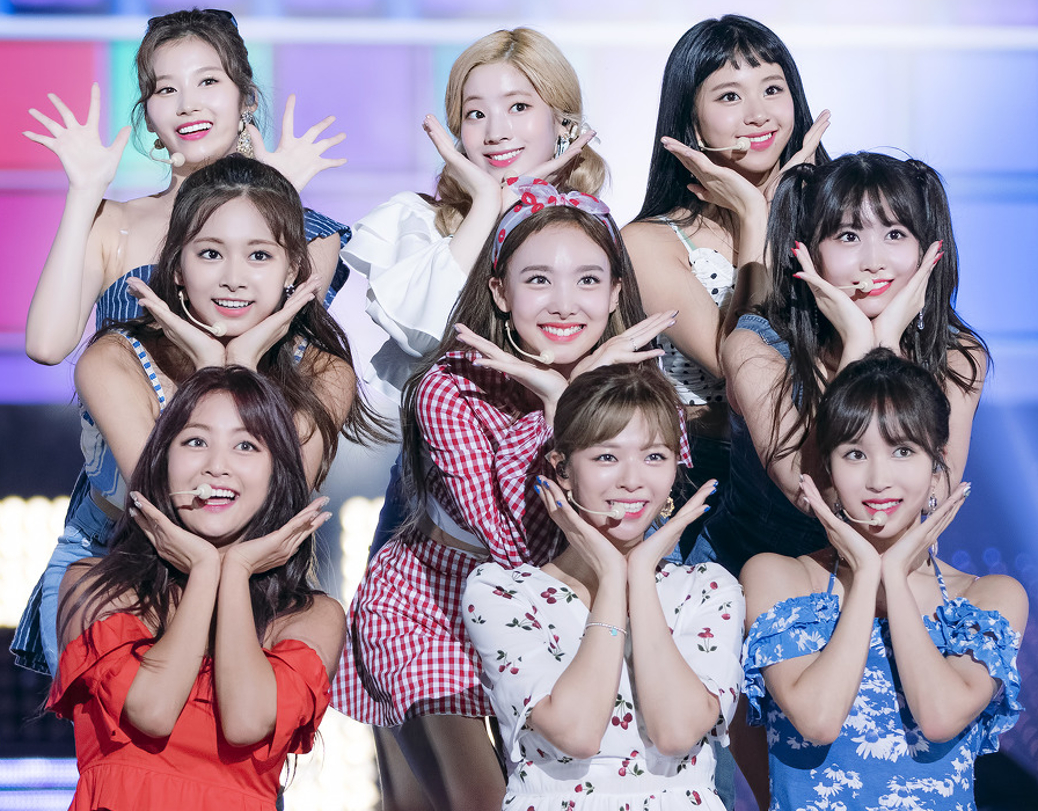
Twice's "Cheer Up" became the best-performing single on the chart of 2016. The group's other song "TT" claimed the top spot for four consecutive weeks.

The Gaon Digital Chart, part of the Gaon Music Chart, is a chart that ranks the best-performing songs in South Korea. The data is collected by the Korea Music Content Association, and it consists of weekly (listed from Sunday to Saturday), monthly, and yearly charts. The Digital Chart ranks songs according to their performance on the Gaon Download, Streaming, and BGM charts. Below is a list of songs that topped the weekly and monthly charts.

== Weekly charts ==
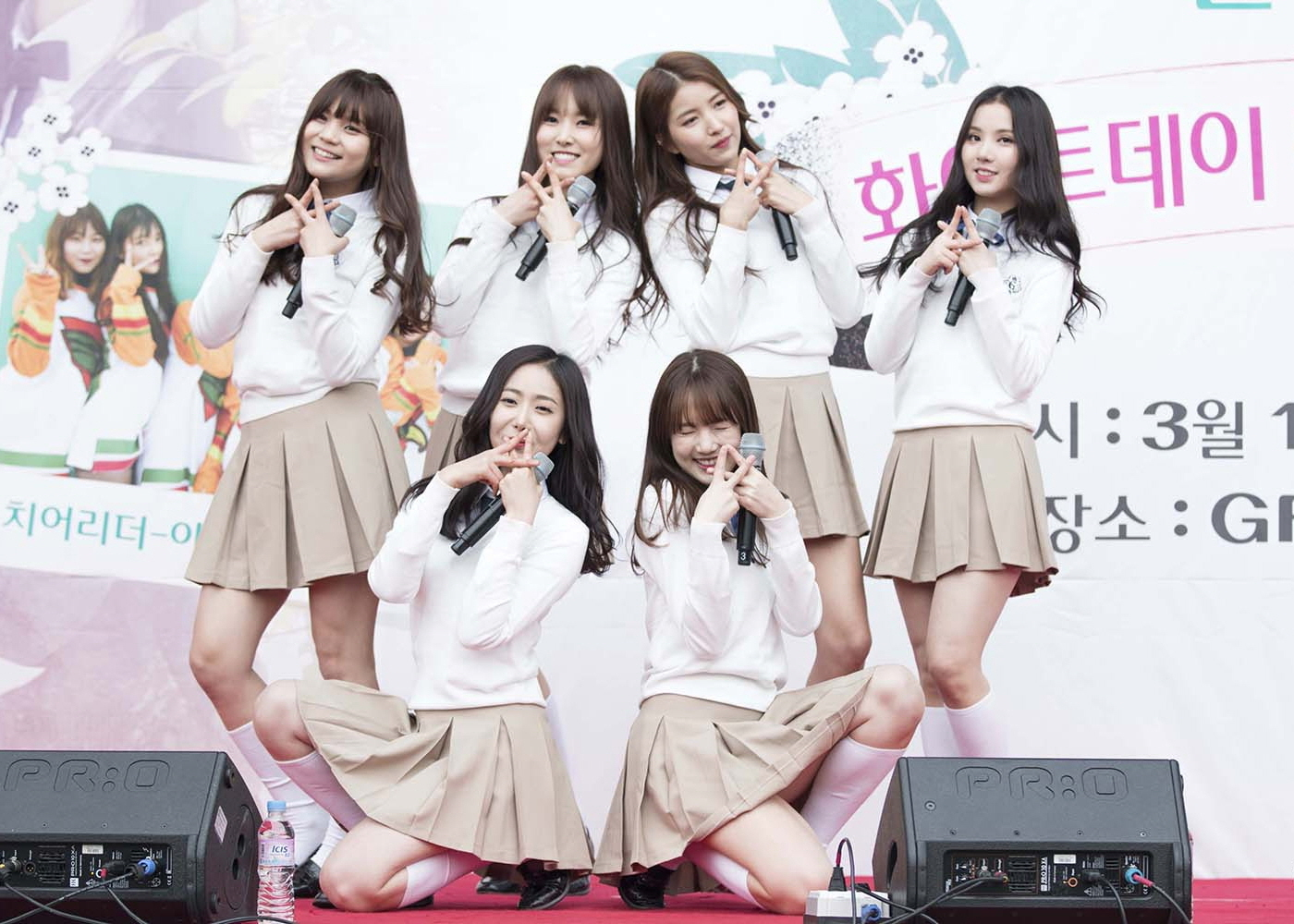
GFriend earned two number-one songs with "Rough" and "Navillera".

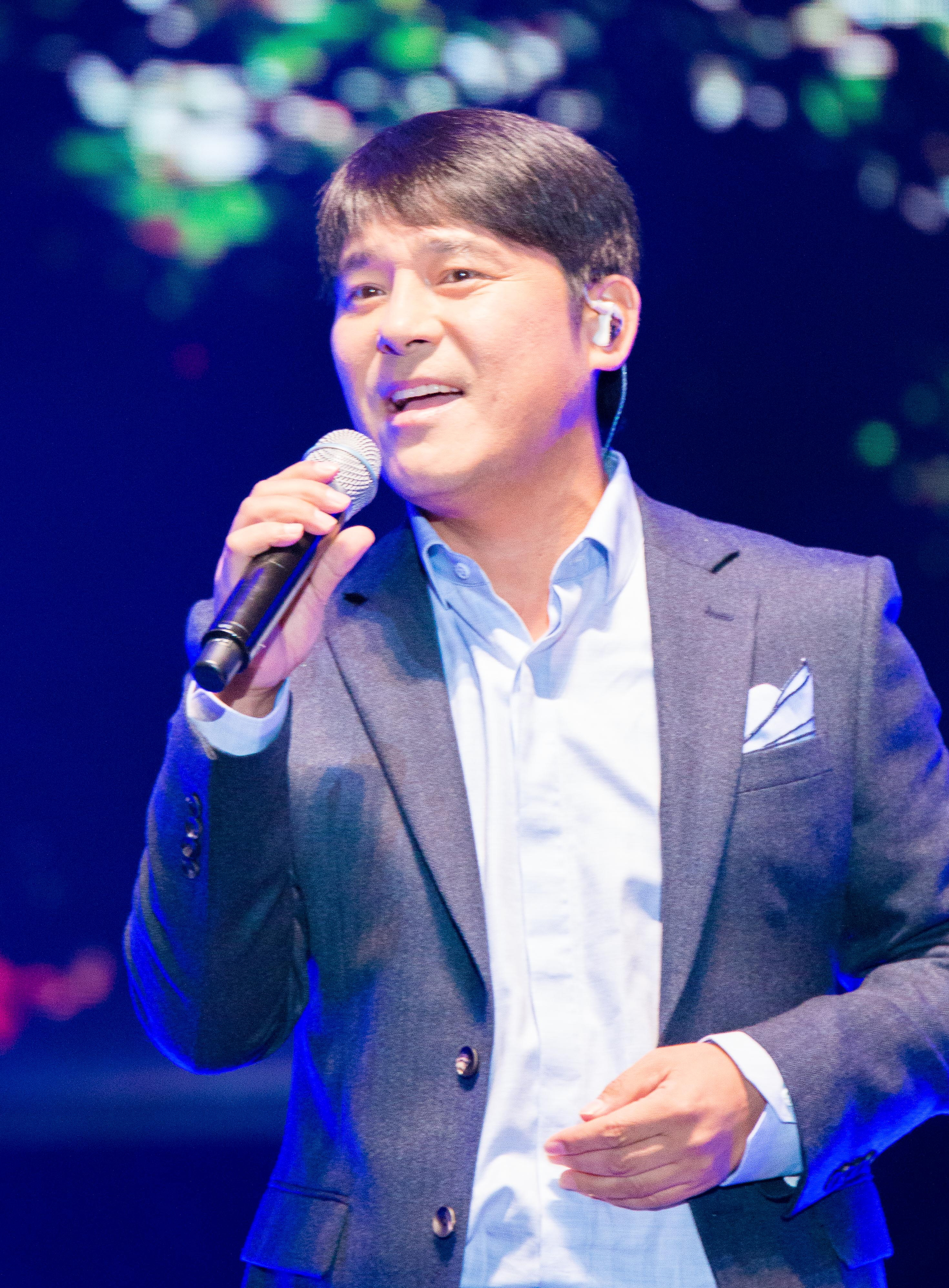
Im Chang-jung's "The Love I Committed" took the top spot for three weeks.

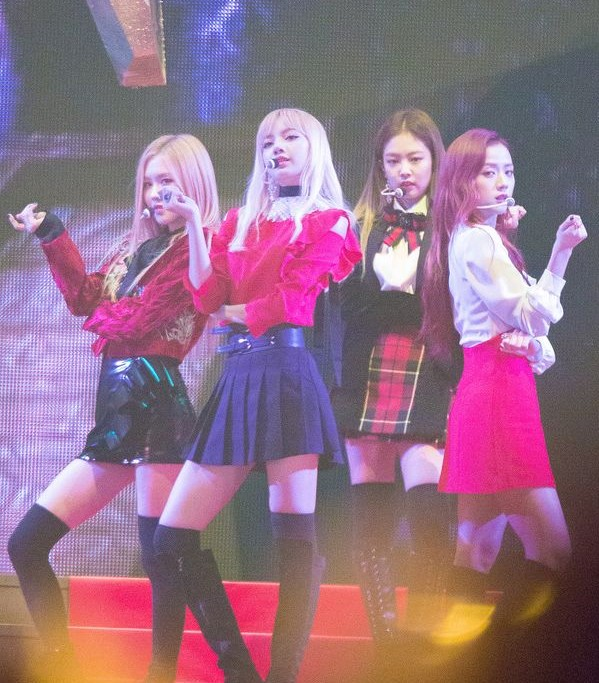
Blackpink topped the chart for two weeks with their debut single "Whistle".

Key
†	Indicates best-performing single of 2016

Week ending date	Song	Artist(s)	Ref.
January 2	"Lonely Night" (또 하루)	Gary featuring Gaeko	
January 9	"Dream"	Suzy and Baekhyun	
January 16	"Dream"	Suzy and Baekhyun	
January 23	"Dream"	Suzy and Baekhyun	
January 30	"I Am You, You Are Me" (너는 나 나는 너)	Zico	
February 6	"Rain"	Taeyeon	
February 13	"Rough" (시간을 달려서)	GFriend	
February 20	"Rough" (시간을 달려서)	GFriend	
February 27	"Everytime"	Chen and Punch	
March 5	"You're the Best" (넌 is 뭔들)	Mamamoo	
March 12	"This Love" (이 사랑)	Davichi	
March 19	"You Are My Everything"	Gummy	
March 26	"Talk Love" (말해! 뭐해?)	K.Will	
April 2	"Fallen in Love (Only With You)" (사랑에 빠졌죠 (당신만이))	Jang Beom-june	
April 9	"What the spring??" (봄이 좋냐??)	10cm	
April 16	"How Can I Love You"	XIA (Junsu)	
April 23	"Hopefully Sky" (하늘바라기)	Jung Eun-ji featuring Hareem	
April 30	"Cheer Up" †	Twice	
May 7	"Re-Bye"	Akdong Musician	
May 14	"Cheer Up" †	Twice	
May 21	"Cheer Up" †	Twice	
May 28	"so-so" (쏘쏘)	Baek A-yeon	
June 4	"I Don't Love You" (널 사랑하지 않아)	Urban Zakapa	
June 11	"Monster"	Exo	
June 18	"Good"	Loco, Gray featuring ELO	
June 25	"I Like That"	Sistar	
July 2	"Comfortable" (맘 편히)	Simon Dominic, Gray & One	
July 9	"Why So Lonely"	Wonder Girls	
July 16	"Navillera" (너 그리고 나)	GFriend	
July 23	"Navillera" (너 그리고 나)	GFriend	
July 30	"Why So Lonely"	Wonder Girls	
August 6	"Summer Night You And I" (여름밤에 우린)	Standing Egg	
August 13	"Whistle" (휘파람)	Blackpink	
August 20	"Whistle" (휘파람)	Blackpink	
August 27	"If You"	Ailee	
September 3	"Making a New Ending for This Story" (이 소설의 끝을 다시 써보려 해)	Han Dong-geun	
September 10	"The Love I Committed" (내가 저지른 사랑)	Im Chang-jung	
September 17	"The Love I Committed" (내가 저지른 사랑)	Im Chang-jung	
September 24	"The Love I Committed" (내가 저지른 사랑)	Im Chang-jung	
October 1	"Breath" (숨)	Park Hyo Shin	
October 8	"Three Words" (세 단어)	Sechs Kies	
October 15	"Blood Sweat & Tears" (피 땀 눈물)	BTS	
October 22	"Very Very Very" (너무너무너무)	I.O.I	
October 29	"TT"	Twice	
November 5	"TT"	Twice	
November 12	"TT"	Twice	
November 19	"TT"	Twice	
November 26	"Sweet Dream" (나비잠)	Heechul and Min Kyung-hoon	
December 3	"The Fool" (이 바보야)	Jung Seung-hwan	
December 10	"Star" (저 별)	Heize	
December 17	"Fxxk It" (에라 모르겠다)	Big Bang	
December 24	"Fxxk It" (에라 모르겠다)	Big Bang	
December 31	"Fxxk It" (에라 모르겠다)	Big Bang	

== Monthly charts ==
Month	Song	Artist(s)	Ref.
January	"Dream"	Suzy and Baekhyun	
February	"Rough"	GFriend	
March	"This Love" (이 사랑)	Davichi	
April	"What the spring??" (봄이 좋냐??)	10cm	
May	"Cheer Up" †	Twice	
June	"I Don't Love You" (널 사랑하지 않아)	Urban Zakapa	
July	"Why So Lonely"	Wonder Girls	
August	"Whistle" (휘파람)	Blackpink	
September	"The Love I Committed" (내가 저지른 사랑)	Im Chang-jung	
October	"Three Words" (세 단어)	Sechs Kies	
November	"TT"	Twice	
December	"Fxxk It" (에라 모르겠다)	BigBang	
