= Yes or Yes =

2018 extended play by Twice

- Digital cover

EP by Twice
- Released: November 5, 2018
- Studios: The Vibe; 821 Sound; Ingrid; U Productions; Feeline; MonoTree; Iconic; JYPE
- Genres: K-pop; dance-pop
- Length: 24:02
- Languages: Korean; English
- Label: JYP
- Producer: J.Y. Park "The Asiansoul"

Twice chronology
BDZ (2018)	Yes or Yes (2018)	The Year of "Yes" (2018)

Singles from Yes or Yes
- 1. "Yes or Yes" Released: November 5, 2018

Yes or Yes (stylized as YES or YES) is the sixth extended play by the South Korean girl group Twice. It was released on November 5, 2018, by JYP Entertainment. It contains seven tracks, including the lead single of the same name and the Korean version of "BDZ". Twice members Jeongyeon, Chaeyoung and Jihyo took part in writing lyrics for three songs on the EP.

The album was a commercial success for the group, topping the Gaon Album Chart and becoming Twice's first Korean album to top Japan's Oricon Albums Chart. It recorded over 500,000 copies sold, and with its release, Twice reached an accumulated number of over 3 million albums sold in South Korea. A reissue, titled The Year of "Yes", was released on December 12, 2018.

== Background and release ==
In early October 2018, advertisements with the phrase "Do you like Twice? Yes or Yes" (Korean: "트와이스 좋아하세요? Yes or Yes") were put up on subway billboards, drawing attention online. On October 11, JYP Entertainment confirmed that Twice planned to release a third Korean album that year on November 5. Yes or Yes was revealed as the album's title on October 20 and a special video commemorating Twice's third anniversary contained a short clip of the album's lead single of the same name.

Twice released their first group teaser photo regarding their comeback on October 23. On October 24, individual teaser posters featuring Nayeon, Jeongyeon, and Momo were uploaded. A track list image for the album's eponymous title track was also posted, revealing that it was written by Sim Eun-jee, who previously worked with Twice as a songwriter for "Knock Knock". On October 25, individual teaser photos featuring Sana, Jihyo, and Mina were posted by the group. On the same day, a second track list image for the album was posted, revealing the titles of three songs written by Twice members: "LaLaLa" penned by Jeongyeon, "Young & Wild" co-written by Chaeyoung, and "Sunset" being written by Jihyo. On October 26, individual teaser photos featuring Dahyun, Chaeyoung, and Tzuyu were uploaded. A third track list image unveiling additional details about the album was also posted, revealing seven songs in total.

On October 27, a second group teaser photo was released by Twice. On October 28, a second set of individual teaser photos featuring each member was uploaded. Twice then revealed their first music video teaser for "Yes or Yes" on October 29. On October 30, Twice unveiled their third group teaser poster. The following day, the group released the second music video teaser for the album's title track, revealing their opening choreography. A full preview of the album's contents was revealed by the group on November 1. On November 2, Twice uploaded their third music video teaser, revealing more of their choreography and opening verse. More parts of the lead track's opening verse was revealed by the group on November 3. A highlight medley featuring snippets from all of the album's tracks was uploaded on November 4.

Yes or Yes alongside its eponymous lead single was officially released on November 5, with Twice holding their live showcase at the KBS Arena Hall in Hwagok-dong, Gangseo-gu, Seoul.

== Composition ==
Yes or Yes is an EP consisting of seven tracks. The title track "Yes or Yes" was composed by David Amber and Andy Love, with Korean lyrics by Sim Eun-jee. Amber previously co-composed "Heart Shaker" and Sim Eun-jee co-wrote lyrics for "Knock Knock". "Yes or Yes" was described as a bright and lively "color pop" song in the synth-pop genre with influences from Motown, reggae and arena pop. Lyrically, it is about only being able to reply "yes" to a confession of love.

"Say You Love Me" is an upbeat song which lyrically describes the feeling of one who is admitting to their romantic interest and waiting for their reply. "LaLaLa" is written by Jeongyeon, and is described as a "quintessential love song". "Young & Wild" is penned by Chaeyoung and lyrically talks about self-confidence. "Sunset", written by Jihyo, features a mono-speaker sound effect with its lyrics comparing one's romantic interest to a sunset. "After Moon" is classified as a ballad track. The album's final track is the Korean version of "BDZ" from their Japanese album BDZ.

== Promotion ==
Two days before the album's release, Twice appeared on the television show Knowing Bros and performed part of "Yes or Yes" for the first time. The group held a showcase for the album on November 5, 2018, at the KBS Arena Hall in Gangseo-gu, Seoul. The first televised performance of "Yes or Yes" was at the 2018 MBC Plus X Genie Music Awards on November 6. Twice also appeared on Idol Room as part of the promotion for the album.

The group promoted the album on several Korean music show programs, first performing the title track and "BDZ" on M Countdown on November 8. They also performed on KBS2's Music Bank on November 9 and 23, SBS' Inkigayo on November 11, MBC M's Show Champion on November 14, and MBC's Show! Music Core on November 17. The title track "Yes or Yes" garnered a total of four music show wins, first getting a win on Show Champion on November 14. It received a music show win on M!Countdown and Inkigayo, and achieved its fourth win on Show Champion for the second week.

Twice also performed "Yes or Yes" at the 39th Blue Dragon Film Awards held on November 23.

== Commercial performance ==
In South Korea, Yes or Yes topped the Gaon Album Chart for the week ending November 10, 2018. It was Twice's first Korean album to rank number 1 on Japan's Oricon Albums Chart and Digital Albums Chart. On November 11, Yes or Yes received a Platinum certification from the Korea Music Content Association (KMCA) for reaching sales of over 250,000 copies. The album then ranked at number three on the monthly Gaon Album Chart for the month of November, recording 322,803 copies sold. In June 2024, the album reached 500,000 sales and received a Double Platinum certification from the KMCA.

With the release of Yes or Yes, Twice reached an accumulated number of over 3 million albums sold in South Korea, achieving the feat within three years of their career.

== Track listing ==
Yes or Yes
No.	Title	Lyrics	Music	Arrangement	Length
1.	"Yes or Yes"	Sim Eun-jee	David Amber; Andy Love	David Amber	3:58
2.	"Say You Love Me"	Sophia Pae; Secret Weapon	Sophia Pae; Secret Weapon	Secret Weapon	3:33
3.	"LaLaLa"	Jeongyeon	Albi Albertsson; Akina Ingold	Mussashi (A. Albertsson)	3:06
4.	"Young & Wild"	Chaeyoung; Kim Hyun-yoo (Flying Lab)	Kim Petras; CJ Abraham; MkX	MkX	3:01
5.	"Sunset"	Jihyo	Maria Marcus; Lisa Desmond; Fast Lane; Secret Weapon	Secret Weapon	3:43
6.	"After Moon"	Iggy (Oreo); C-no (Oreo); Woong Kim (Oreo)	Iggy (Oreo); C-no (Oreo); Woong Kim (Oreo)	Woong Kim (Oreo)	3:24
7.	"BDZ" (Korean ver.)	J.Y. Park "The Asiansoul"	J.Y. Park "The Asiansoul"	J.Y. Park "The Asiansoul"; Lee Hae-sol	3:16
Total length:					24:02

== Content production ==
Credits adapted from album liner notes.

=== Locations ===
Recording

- The Vibe Studio, Seoul, South Korea ("Yes or Yes")
- 821 Sound, Seoul, South Korea ("Yes or Yes")
- Ingrid Studio, Seoul, South Korea ("Yes or Yes", "Young & Wild")
- U Productions, Seoul, South Korea ("Say You Love Me", "LaLaLa", "Young & Wild", "Sunset", "After Moon")
- Feeline Studio, Seoul, South Korea ("Say You Love Me")
- MonoTree Studio, Seoul, South Korea ("LaLaLa")
- Iconic Studio, Seoul, South Korea ("Sunset")
- JYPE Studios, Seoul, South Korea ("BDZ")

Mixing

- Rcave Sound, Seoul, South Korea ("Yes or Yes", "Say You Love Me", "LaLaLa", "Young & Wild", "Sunset", "After Moon")
- Mirrorball Studios, North Hollywood, California ("BDZ")

Mastering

- Sterling Sound, New York City, New York ("Yes or Yes", "BDZ")
- 821 Sound Mastering, Seoul, South Korea ("Say You Love Me", "LaLaLa", "Young & Wild", "Sunset", "After Moon")

Photography

- Miss Yoon in Wonderland, Seoul, South Korea

=== Personnel ===
- J. Y. Park "The Asiansoul" – producer, all instruments (on "BDZ")
- Lee Ji-young – direction and coordination (A&R)
- Jang Ha-na – music (A&R)
- Kim Yeo-joo (Jane Kim) – music (A&R)
- Kim Ji-hyeong – production (A&R)
- Cha Ji-yoon – production (A&R)
- Kang Geon – production (A&R)
- Hwang Hyun-joon – production (A&R)
- Kim Bo-hyeon – design (A&R), album art direction and design, web design
- Kim Tae-eun – design (A&R), album art direction and design
- Seo Yeon-ah – design (A&R), web design
- Lee So-yeon – design (A&R), album art direction and design
- Lee Ga-young – design (A&R), album art direction and design, web design
- Choi Hye-jin – recording engineer (on "Yes or Yes", "Say You Love Me" and "Sunset")
- Eom Se-hee – recording engineer (on "Yes or Yes" and "BDZ")
- Jang Han-soo – recording engineer (on "After Moon")
- Lee Sang-yeop – recording engineer (on "LaLaLa" and "Young & Wild")
- Woo Min-jeong – recording engineer (on "Yes or Yes" and "Young & Wild")
- Sophia Pae – recording engineer, vocal director and background vocals (on "Say You Love Me" and "Sunset")
- Choo Dae-kwon (MonoTree) – recording engineer, vocal director (on "LaLaLa")
- Kim Jeong – recording engineer (on "Sunset")
- Lee Tae-seop – mixing engineer (on "Yes or Yes", "Say You Love Me", "LaLaLa", "Sunset" and "After Moon")
- Lim Hong-jin – mixing engineer (on "Young & Wild")
- Tony Maserati – mixing engineer (on "BDZ")
- Kwon Nam-woo – mastering engineer (on "Say You Love Me", "LaLaLa", "Young & Wild", "Sunset" and "After Moon")
- Chris Gehringer – mastering engineer (on "Yes or Yes" and "BDZ")
- Naive Production – video director
- Kim Young-jo – video executive producer
- Yoo Seung-woo – video executive producer
- Choi Pyeong-gang – video co-producer
- Kwak Gi-gon at TEO Agency – photographer
- Ahn Yeon-hoo – photographer
- Son Eun-hee at Lulu – hair director
- Jung Nan-young at Lulu – hair director
- Choi Ji-young at Lulu – hair director
- Im Jin-hee at Lulu – hair director
- Jo Sang-ki at Lulu – make-up director
- Jeon Dal-lae at Lulu – make-up director
- Zia at Lulu – make-up director
- Won Jung-yo at Bit&Boot – make-up director
- Choi Su-ji at Bit&Boot – make-up director
- Oh Yu-ra – style director
- Shin Hyun-kuk – management and marketing director
- Daseul Kim – choreographer
- Today Art – printing
- David Amber – programming, keyboards, guitars (on "Yes or Yes")
- Sim Eun-jee – vocal director (on "Yes or Yes")
- Twice – background vocals (on "Yes or Yes" and "BDZ")
- Kwon Seon-young – background vocals (on "Yes or Yes" and "Young & Wild")
- Jeong Yu-ra at Anemone Studio – digital editor (on "Yes or Yes" and "Young & Wild")
- Secret Weapon – all instruments, computer programming (on "Say You Love Me" and "Sunset")
- Jiyoung Shin NYC – additional editor (on "Say You Love Me", "LaLaLa", "Sunset" and "BDZ")
- Albi Albertsson – all instruments, computer programming (on "LaLaLa")
- Yoo Young-jin – background vocals (on "LaLaLa")
- Doko – vocal director, background vocals (on "Young & Wild")
- Kim Woong – drum, bass guitar, synthesizer, piano (on "After Moon")
- Kim So-ri – background vocals (on "After Moon")
- Moon Soo-jeong – digital editor (on "After Moon")
- Lee Hae-sol – all instruments, computer programming (on "BDZ")
- Jung Jae-pil – guitars (on "BDZ")
- Dr. Jo – vocal director (on "BDZ")

== Charts ==
=== Weekly charts ===
Chart (2018)	Peak position
French Download Albums (SNEP)	125
Japan Hot Albums (Billboard)	7
Japanese Albums (Oricon)	1
Japanese Digital Albums (Oricon)	1
South Korean Albums (Gaon)	1
US Heatseekers Albums (Billboard)	13
US World Albums (Billboard)	7

=== Year-end charts ===
Chart (2018)	Position
Japanese Albums (Oricon)	60
South Korean Albums (Gaon)	15

Chart (2019)	Position
Japanese Albums (Oricon)	46

== Certifications ==
Certifications for Yes or Yes
Region	Certification	Certified units/sales
South Korea (KMCA)	2× Platinum	500,000^{^}
^{^} Shipments figures based on certification alone.

== Accolades ==
Year	Award	Category	Result	Ref.
2019	8th Gaon Chart Music Awards	Artist of the Year – Physical Album (4th Quarter)	Nominated	
