= Twice singles discography =

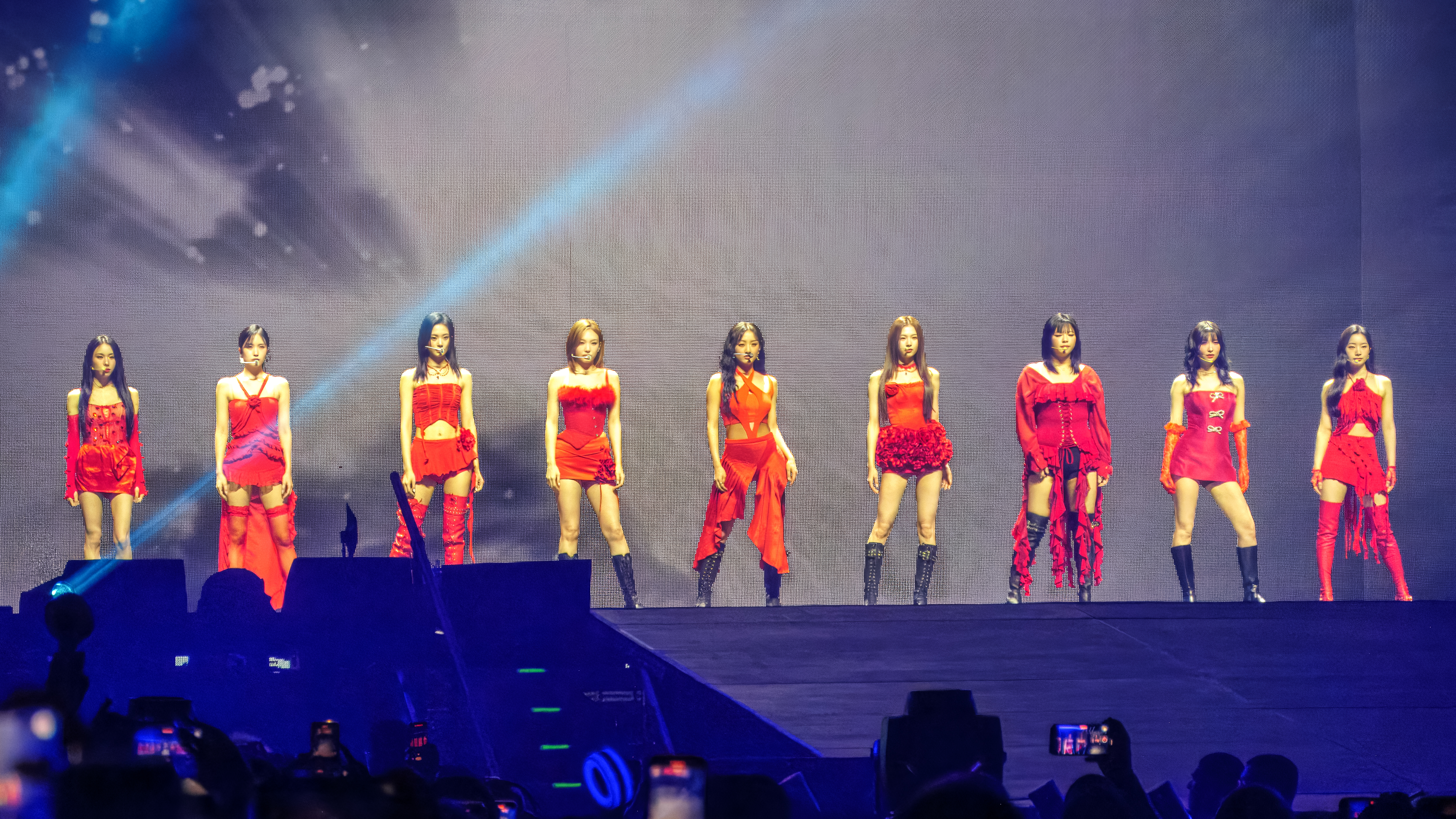
- Twice in 2024
- Singles: 46
- Promotional singles: 15
- Other charted songs: 56

The singles discography of South Korean girl group Twice consists of forty-six singles and fifteen promotional singles. The group composed of nine members; Nayeon, Jeongyeon, Momo, Sana, Jihyo, Mina, Dahyun, Chaeyoung and Tzuyu, was formed by JYP Entertainment in July 2015 through the survival television show Sixteen.

In South Korea, the group debuted in October 2015 with the release of the single "Like Ooh-Ahh", which became their first top ten single on the Gaon Digital Chart. The group would later earn nine consecutive number-ones from 2016 to 2018; "Cheer Up", "TT", "Knock Knock", "Signal", "Likey", "Heart Shaker", "What Is Love?", "Dance the Night Away" and "Yes or Yes". Subsequent Korean singles from 2019 to 2021; "Fancy", "Feel Special", "More & More", "I Can't Stop Me" and "Alcohol-Free", all peaked inside the top ten. Other Korean singles from 2018 to 2024; "The Best Thing I Ever Did", "Cry for Me", "Scientist", "Talk That Talk", "Set Me Free" and "One Spark" charted within the top 200. "What Is Love?", "Dance the Night Away", "Yes or Yes" and "Fancy" also received platinum certifications from the Korea Music Content Association (KMCA) for achieving 100 million streams.

In Japan, the group's first two Japanese singles, "One More Time" and "Candy Pop", were certified platinum by the Recording Industry Association of Japan (RIAJ). Their third Japanese single, "Wake Me Up", became the first physical single by a foreign female artist to earn a double platinum certification. The group's subsequent Japanese singles, "Happy Happy", "Breakthrough" and "Fanfare", also received platinum certifications.

In the United States, the group's English singles, "The Feels", "Moonlight Sunrise", "Strategy" and "Takedown" all charted on the Billboard Hot 100.

To date, Twice has earned nine number-one singles on the Gaon Digital Chart, six number-one singles on the K-pop Hot 100, four number-one singles on the Oricon Singles Chart, five number-one singles on the Billboard Japan Hot 100 and four number-one singles on the World Digital Song Sales.

== Singles ==
=== Korean singles ===
List of Korean singles, showing year released, selected chart positions, sales figures, music recording certifications and originating album
Title	Year	Peak chart positions										Sales (Note: Sales figures for tracks are based on digital downloads, except noted.)	Certifications	Album
Title	Year	KOR	KOR Billb. (Note: Includes the Billboard K-pop Hot 100 (defunct as of 2022), and South Korea Songs (part of Billboard's Hits of the World (2022 onwards)).)	JPN Hot	JPN Dig.	CAN	NZ Hot	SGP	US Bub.	US World	WW	Sales	Certifications	Album
"Like Ooh-Ahh" (Ooh-Ahh하게)	2015	10	—	27	—	—	—	—	—	6	—	KOR: 2,500,000	RIAJ: Gold (Note: Certification for streaming)	The Story Begins
"Cheer Up"	2016	1	53	23	—	—	—	—	—	3	—	KOR: 2,737,015	RIAJ: Gold	Page Two
"TT"	2016	1	36	3	17	—	—	—	—	2	—	KOR: 2,500,000; JPN: 100,000 (Note: Certification for digital downloads); US: 33,000	RIAJ: Platinum (Note: "TT" (Japanese ver.) was certified gold for downloads in February 2018 and platinum for streaming in June 2026. "TT" (Korean ver.) was certified gold for streaming in June 2022.)	Twicecoaster: Lane 1
"Knock Knock"	2017	1	25	15	—	—	—	—	—	5	—	KOR: 2,500,000; US: 3,000	RIAJ: Gold	Twicecoaster: Lane 2
"Signal"	2017	1	1	4	—	—	—	—	—	3	—	KOR: 1,250,964	RIAJ: Gold	Signal
"Likey"	2017	1	1	2	—	—	—	—	—	1	—	KOR: 2,500,000; US: 5,000	RIAJ: Platinum	Twicetagram
"Heart Shaker"	2017	1	1	4	5	—	—	—	—	2	—	KOR: 2,500,000; JPN: 13,333	RIAJ: Platinum	Merry & Happy
"What Is Love?"	2018	1	1	6	5	—	—	5	—	3	—	KOR: 2,500,000; JPN: 15,735	KMCA: Platinum (Note: "What is Love" was certified platinum for streaming in October 2019 and for downloads in August 2020.); RIAJ: Platinum; RMNZ: Gold	What Is Love?
"Dance the Night Away"	2018	1	1	5	11	—	—	13	—	2	—	KOR: 2,500,000; JPN: 12,705	KMCA: Platinum (Note: "Dance the Night Away" was certified platinum for streaming in March 2019 and for downloads in September 2019.); RIAJ: Platinum	Summer Nights
"Yes or Yes"	2018	1	2	5	14	—	—	4	—	5	—	KOR: 2,500,000; JPN: 15,954	KMCA: Platinum (Note: "Yes or Yes" was certified platinum for streaming in August 2019 and for downloads in February 2021.); RIAJ: Platinum	Yes or Yes
"The Best Thing I Ever Did" (올해 제일 잘한 일)	2018	27	22	67	—	—	—	—	—	17	—			The Year of "Yes"
"Fancy"	2019	3	3	4	8	—	17	—	—	4	—	JPN: 16,963; US: 2,000	KMCA: Platinum; RIAJ: 2× Platinum; RMNZ: Gold	Fancy You
"Feel Special"	2019	9	1	4	13	82	8	3	—	1	— (Note: "Feel Special" did not enter the Billboard Global 200; it peaked at number 190 on the Billboard Global Excl. U.S. chart.)	JPN: 8,424; US: 2,000	RIAJ: 3× Platinum; RMNZ: Gold	Feel Special
"More & More"	2020	4	2	3	10	—	12	1	—	2	—	JPN: 10,361	RIAJ: Platinum	More & More
"I Can't Stop Me"	2020	8	5	5	9	—	13	2	—	1	31	JPN: 8,802	RIAA: Gold; RIAJ: 2× Platinum	Eyes Wide Open
"Cry for Me"	2020	164	—	53	—	—	10	12	—	1	— (Note: "Cry for Me" did not enter the Billboard Global 200; it peaked at number 122 on the Billboard Global Excl. U.S. chart.)		RIAJ: Gold	Non-album single
"Alcohol-Free"	2021	6	7	19	—	—	28	7	—	3	41		RIAJ: Gold	Taste of Love
"Scientist"	2021	32	19	25	—	—	27	16	—	7	52		RIAJ: Gold	Formula of Love: O+T=<3
"Talk That Talk"	2022	20	9	7	27	65	6	3	16	4	18		RIAJ: Platinum	Between 1&2
"Set Me Free"	2023	94	19	16	16	75	13	8	7	2	28	JPN: 4,606	RIAJ: Gold	Ready to Be
"One Spark"	2024	126	—	18	29	—	27	23	—	3	93	JPN: 5,942	RIAJ: Gold	With You-th
"—" denotes a recording that did not chart or was not released in that territory.

=== Japanese singles ===
List of Japanese singles, showing year released, selected chart positions, sales figures, music recording certifications and originating album
Title	Year	Peak chart positions						Sales	Certifications	Album
Title	Year	KOR DL	KOR Billb.	JPN	JPN Hot	US World	WW Excl.	Sales	Certifications	Album
"One More Time"	2017	—	—	1	1	8	—	JPN: 267,533 (physical)	RIAJ: Gold; RIAJ: Platinum (Note: Certification for physical sales)	BDZ
"Candy Pop"	2018	— (Note: "Candy Pop" did not enter the Gaon Download Chart; it peaked at number 80 on the international Gaon Digital Chart.)	—	1	1	—	—	JPN: 341,773 (physical); JPN: 29,326 (digital)	RIAJ: Platinum; RIAJ: Gold	BDZ
"Wake Me Up"	2018	—	—	1	1	—	—	JPN: 363,778 (physical); JP: 19,378 (digital)	RIAJ: 2× Platinum	BDZ
"BDZ"	2018	—	—	—	7	23	—		RIAJ: Gold	BDZ
"Happy Happy"	2019	—	—	2	2	—	—	JPN: 316,044 (physical); JPN: 5,653 (digital)	RIAJ: Platinum	&Twice
"Breakthrough"	2019	—	99	2	1	11	—	JPN: 326,794 (physical)	RIAJ: Platinum; RIAJ: Gold	&Twice
"Fake & True"	2019	—	—	—	19	—	—			&Twice
"Fanfare"	2020	—	—	1	1	—	—	JPN: 220,154 (physical)	RIAJ: Platinum; RIAJ: Platinum	Perfect World
"Better"	2020	—	—	2	3	—	—	JPN: 105,821 (physical)	RIAJ: Gold; RIAJ: Gold	Perfect World
"Kura Kura"	2021	—	—	3	3	—	163	JPN: 94,166 (physical); JPN: 3,827 (digital)	RIAJ: Gold; RIAJ: Gold	Perfect World
"Perfect World"	2021	—	—	—	24	—	192		RIAJ: Gold	Perfect World
"Doughnut"	2021	—	—	3	6	—	—	JPN: 62,303 (physical)	RIAJ: Gold	Celebrate
"Celebrate"	2022	174	—	—	10	—	154		RIAJ: Platinum	Celebrate
"Hare Hare"	2023	—	—	2	3	—	—	JPN: 165,046 (physical)	RIAJ: Gold; RIAJ: Gold	Dive
"Dive"	2024	—	—	—	25	—	—	JPN: 2,458 (digital)		Dive
"Enemy"	2025	—	—	—	46	—	—	JPN: 1,318 (digital)		Enemy
"—" denotes a recording that did not chart or was not released in that territory.

=== English singles ===
List of English singles, showing year released, selected chart positions, sales figures, music recording certifications and originating album
Title	Year	Peak chart positions										Sales	Certifications	Album
Title	Year	KOR	JPN Hot	JPN Dig.	AUS	CAN	NZ	SGP	UK	US	WW	Sales	Certifications	Album
"I Want You Back"	2018	—	12	7	—	—	—	—	—	—	—	JPN: 50,332	RIAJ: Gold	BDZ
"The Feels"	2021	94	3	15	—	56	— (Note: "The Feels" did not enter the NZ Top Singles Chart; it peaked at number 4 on the NZ Hot Singles Chart.)	4	80	83	12		RIAA: Gold; RIAJ: 2× Platinum; RMNZ: Gold	Non-album single
"Moonlight Sunrise"	2023	152	5	8	— (Note: "Moonlight Sunrise" did not enter the ARIA Singles Chart; it peaked at number 36 on the ARIA Digital Track Chart.)	62	— (Note: "Moonlight Sunrise" did not enter the NZ Top Singles Chart; it peaked at number 4 on the NZ Hot Singles Chart.)	11	— (Note: "Moonlight Sunrise" did not enter the UK Singles Chart; it peaked at number 39 on the UK Singles Sales Chart.)	84	22	JPN: 12,160	RIAJ: Platinum	Ready to Be
"I Got You"	2024	— (Note: "I Got You" did not enter the Circle Digital Chart; it peaked at number 16 on the Circle Download Chart.)	23	28	—	96	— (Note: "I Got You" did not enter the NZ Top Singles Chart; it peaked at number 31 on the NZ Hot Singles Chart.)	10	— (Note: "I Got You" did not enter the UK Singles Chart; it peaked at number 12 on the UK Singles Sales Chart.)	— (Note: "I Got You" did not enter the Billboard Hot 100; it peaked at number 24 on the Digital Song Sales.)	38	JPN: 4,756		With You-th
"Strategy" (solo or featuring Megan Thee Stallion)	2024	112	43	26	45	48	34	15	32	51	39	JPN: 2,312	BPI: Silver; RIAA: Platinum; RMNZ: Platinum	Strategy
"Takedown" (Note: Performed by Chaeyoung, Jeongyeon and Jihyo.)	2025	38	—	—	28	45	29	22	24	50	30		BPI: Silver; RMNZ: Gold	KPop Demon Hunters (Soundtrack from the Netflix Film)
"This Is For"	2025	102	13	34	—	—	— (Note: "This Is For" did not enter the NZ Top Singles Chart; it peaked at number 16 on the NZ Hot Singles Chart.)	17	—	—	38	JPN: 3,523		This Is For
"Superstars" (with Saweetie)	2025	—	—	—	—	—	—	—	—	—	—			Hella Pressure
"Me+You"	2025	— (Note: "Me+You" did not enter the Circle Digital Chart; it peaked at number 18 on the Circle Download Chart.)	—	—	—	—	—	—	—	—	—			Ten: The Story Goes On
"—" denotes a recording that did not chart or was not released in that territory.

== Promotional singles ==
=== Promotional Japanese singles ===
List of promotional Japanese singles, showing year released, selected chart positions, sales figures and originating album
Title	Year	Peak chart positions		Sales	Album
Title	Year	JPN Hot	JPN Dig.	Sales	Album
"Signal" (Japanese version) (Note: "Signal (Japanese ver.)" was released on June 14, 2017, as a digital single.)	2017	—	—		#Twice
"Stay by My Side" (Note: "Stay by My Side" was released digitally on October 22, 2018, and was featured as a theme song of the television series Shinya no Dame Koi Zukan (2018).)	2018	23	11	JPN: 6,289	BDZ (Repackage)
"Likey" (Japanese version) (Note: "Likey (Japanese ver.)" was released on January 11, 2019, as a digital single.)	2019	—	—		#Twice2
"What Is Love?" (Japanese version) (Note: ""What Is Love?" (Japanese ver.)" was released on February 8, 2019, as a digital single.)	2019	—	—		#Twice2
"Stuck in My Head" (Japanese version)	2020	59	—		#Twice3
"Scientist" (Japanese version)	2022	—	—		#Twice4
"Just Be Yourself" (Note: "Just Be Yourself" was released digitally on March 22, 2022, and was used in Twice's advertisements for Lux Japan hair care products.)	2022	—	—		Celebrate
"Dance Again" (Note: "Dance Again" was released digitally on December 12, 2023, and was featured in the "FamilyMart x Twice Christmas Chicken" advertising campaign.)	2023	77	—		Dive
"The Wish" (Note: "The Wish" was released digitally on December 16, 2024, and was featured in a television commercial for FamilyMart.)	2024	79	—		Enemy
"Talk That Talk" (Japanese version) (Note: "Talk That Talk" (Japanese ver.) was released on April 14, 2025, as a digital single.)	2025	—	—		#Twice5
"Like 1"	2025	59	—		Enemy
"—" denotes a recording that did not chart or was not released in that territory.

=== Promotional English singles ===
List of promotional English singles, showing year released, selected chart positions and originating album
Title	Year	Peak chart positions	Album
Title	Year	KOR DL	Album
"More & More" (English version) (Note: "More & More" (English version) was released as a digital single on August 21, 2020.)	2020	—	Non-album promotional singles
"I Can't Stop Me" (English version) (Note: "I Can't Stop Me" (English version) was released as a digital single on November 30, 2020.)	2020	—	Non-album promotional singles
"We Pray" (Twice version) (Coldplay featuring Twice, Little Simz, Burna Boy, Elyanna and Tini)	2025	54	Non-album promotional singles
"—" denotes a recording that did not chart or were not released in that region.

=== Promotional Korean singles ===
List of promotional Korean singles, showing year released, selected chart positions and originating album
Title	Year	Peak chart positions		Album
Title	Year	KOR	KOR Hot	Album
"I Love You More Than Anyone" (누구보다 널 사랑해)	2021	105	75	Hospital Playlist Season 2

== Other charted songs ==
=== Other charted Korean songs ===
List of other charted Korean songs, showing year released, selected chart positions, sales figures and originating album
Title	Year	Peak chart positions					Sales	Album
Title	Year	KOR	KOR Hot	JPN Hot	NZ Hot	US World	Sales	Album
"Do It Again" (다시 해줘)	2015	127	—	—	—	—	KOR: 19,601	The Story Begins
"Going Crazy" (미쳤나봐)	2015	164	—	—	—	—	KOR: 10,882	The Story Begins
"Precious Love" (소중한 사랑)	2016	73	—	—	—	—	KOR: 44,105	Page Two
"Touchdown"	2016	86	—	—	—	—	KOR: 39,181	Page Two
"Woohoo"	2016	108	—	—	—	—	KOR: 26,187	Page Two
"Tuk Tok" (툭하면 톡)	2016	112	—	—	—	—	KOR: 25,355	Page Two
"My Headphones On" (Headphone 써)	2016	133	—	—	—	—	KOR: 23,058	Page Two
"1 to 10"	2016	35	—	—	—	—	KOR: 51,243	Twicecoaster: Lane 1
"One in a Million"	2016	55	—	—	—	—	KOR: 40,724	Twicecoaster: Lane 1
"Ponytail"	2016	67	—	—	—	—	KOR: 33,140	Twicecoaster: Lane 1
"Jelly Jelly"	2016	68	—	—	—	—	KOR: 33,376	Twicecoaster: Lane 1
"Pit-a-Pat"	2016	75	—	—	—	—	KOR: 30,884	Twicecoaster: Lane 1
"Next Page"	2016	78	—	—	—	—	KOR: 30,583	Twicecoaster: Lane 1
"Ice Cream" (녹아요)	2017	19	—	—	—	18	KOR: 62,170	Twicecoaster: Lane 2
"Only You" (Only 너)	2017	56	—	—	—	—	KOR: 32,978	Signal
"Three Times a Day" (하루에 세번)	2017	57	—	—	—	—	KOR: 31,780	Signal
"Someone Like Me"	2017	78	—	—	—	—	KOR: 27,741	Signal
"Hold Me Tight"	2017	80	—	—	—	—	KOR: 26,658	Signal
"Eye Eye Eyes"	2017	82	—	—	—	—	KOR: 26,411	Signal
"Turtle" (거북이)	2017	26	—	—	—	—	KOR: 48,485	Twicetagram
"Missing U"	2017	46	15	—	—	—	KOR: 35,213	Twicetagram
"Wow"	2017	86	17	—	—	—	KOR: 22,128	Twicetagram
"24/7"	2017	95	18	—	—	—	KOR: 21,665	Twicetagram
"FFW"	2017	97	20	—	—	—	KOR: 20,773	Twicetagram
"You in My Heart" (널 내게 담아)	2017	—	19	—	—	—	KOR: 20,934	Twicetagram
"Look at Me" (날 바라바라봐)	2017	—	21	—	—	—	KOR: 20,725	Twicetagram
"Love Line"	2017	—	22	—	—	—	KOR: 20,313	Twicetagram
"Ding Dong"	2017	—	23	—	—	—	KOR: 20,168	Twicetagram
"Don't Give Up" (힘내!)	2017	—	24	—	—	—	KOR: 19,796	Twicetagram
"Jaljayo Good Night" (잘자요 굿나잇)	2017	—	25	—	—	—	KOR: 19,774	Twicetagram
"Rollin'"	2017	—	16	—	—	—	KOR: 19,552	Twicetagram
"Merry & Happy"	2017	24	21	54	—	12	KOR: 100,322	Merry & Happy
"Sweet Talker"	2018	—	22	—	—	—		What Is Love?
"Ho!"	2018	—	30	—	—	—		What Is Love?
"Chillax"	2018	65	12	—	—	9		Summer Nights
"Shot Thru the Heart"	2018	—	—	—	—	12		Summer Nights
"Stuck"	2018	—	—	59	—	—		Summer Nights
"Rainbow"	2019	—	94	—	—	—		Feel Special
"Get Loud"	2019	—	95	—	—	—		Feel Special
"Trick It"	2019	—	96	—	—	—		Feel Special
"Love Foolish"	2019	—	97	—	—	—		Feel Special
"21:29"	2019	—	98	—	—	—		Feel Special
"Oxygen"	2020	—	90	—	—	—		More & More
"I'll Show You" (with K/DA and Bekuh Boom featuring Annika Wells)	2020	—	—	—	38	10		All Out
"Queen of Hearts"	2022	—	—	—	—	13		Between 1&2
"Basics"	2022	—	—	—	31	15		Between 1&2
"Got the Thrills"	2023	—	—	—	—	10		Ready to Be
"Blame It on Me"	2023	—	—	—	—	12		Ready to Be
"Wallflower"	2023	—	—	—	—	11		Ready to Be
"Crazy Stupid Love"	2023	—	—	—	—	9		Ready to Be
"Rush"	2024	—	—	—	—	10		With You-th
"You Get Me"	2024	—	—	—	—	8		With You-th
"—" denotes a recording that did not chart or was not released in that territory.

=== Other charted Japanese songs ===
List of other charted Japanese songs, showing year released, selected chart positions and originating album
Title	Year	Peak chart positions		Album
Title	Year	JPN Hot	NZ Hot	Album
"Luv Me"	2017	38	—	One More Time
"Brand New Girl"	2018	26	—	BDZ
"Be as One"	2018	94	—	BDZ
"Swing"	2020	42	—	&Twice (Repackage)
"Mamushi" (remix) (Megan Thee Stallion featuring Twice)	2024	—	34	Megan: Act II
"—" denotes a recording that did not chart or was not released in that territory.
