= Twice videography =

Twice video discography
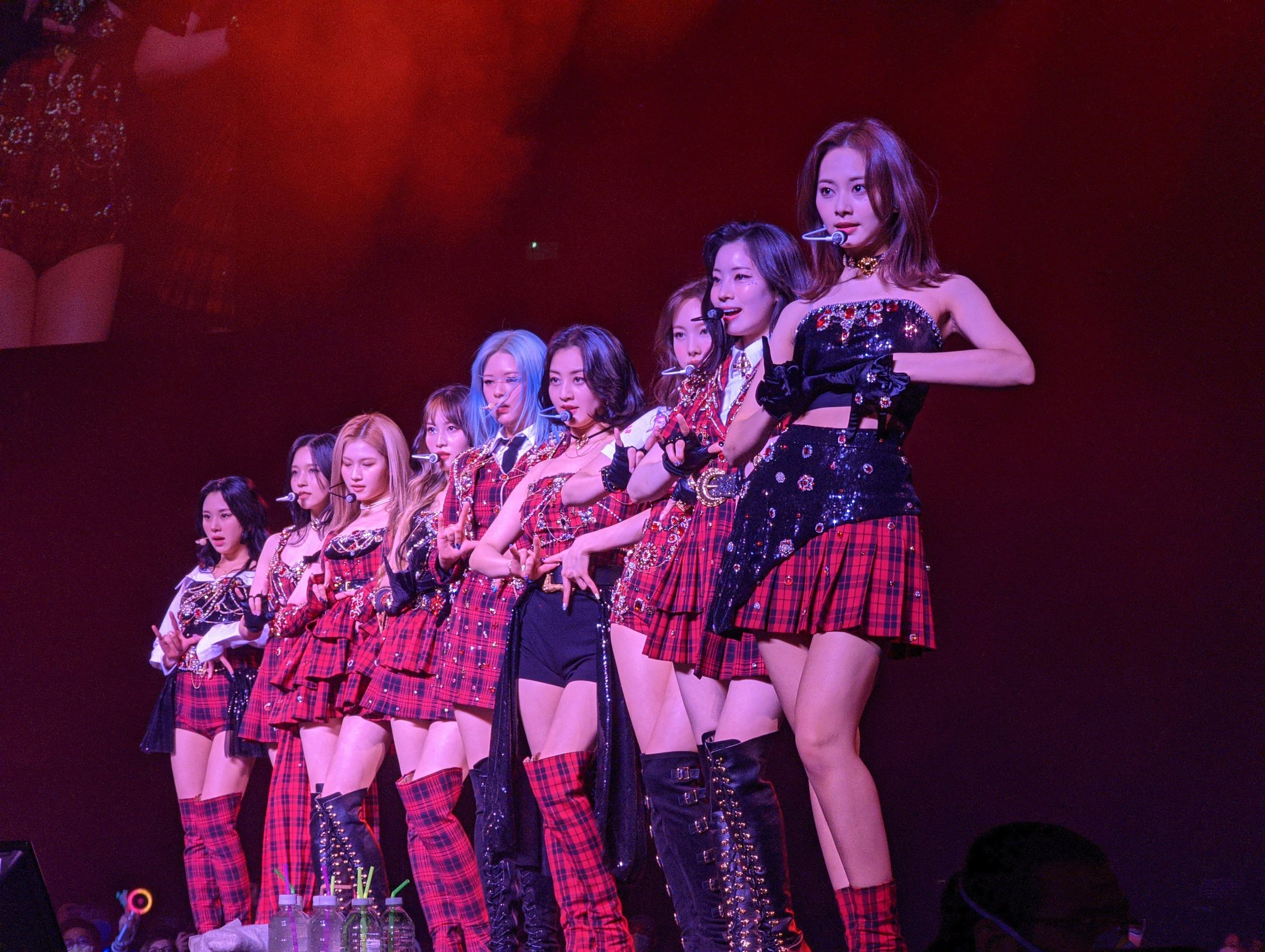
- Twice performing "Fancy" in February 2022
- Music videos: 48
- Films: 2
- Video albums: 22
- DVDs: 35
- Reality shows: 63

The videography of South Korean group Twice consists of forty-eight music videos, two films, twenty-two video albums, thirty-five DVDs and sixty-three reality shows. The group composed of nine members; Nayeon, Jeongyeon, Momo, Sana, Jihyo, Mina, Dahyun, Chaeyoung and Tzuyu, was formed by JYP Entertainment in July 2015 through the survival television show Sixteen.

== Music videos ==
=== Korean music videos ===
List of Korean music videos, showing year released and directors
| Title | Year | Director(s) | Ref. |
|---|---|---|---|
| "Like Ooh-Ahh" (Ooh-Ahh하게) | 2015 | Naive Creative Production | |
| "Cheer Up" | 2016 | Naive Creative Production | |
| "TT" | 2016 | Naive Creative Production | |
| "Knock Knock" | 2017 | Naive Creative Production | |
| "Signal" (Note: The Japanese alternative version was released in 2017.) | 2017 | Naive Creative Production | |
| "Likey" (Note: The Japanese alternative version was released in 2019.) | 2017 | Naive Creative Production | |
| "Heart Shaker" (Note: The Japanese alternative version was released in 2019.) | 2017 | Naive Creative Production | |
| "Merry & Happy" | 2017 | Mustache Films | |
| "What Is Love?" (Note: The Japanese alternative version was released in 2019.) | 2018 | Naive Creative Production | |
| "Dance the Night Away" (Note: The Japanese alternative version was released in 2019.) | 2018 | Naive Creative Production | |
| "Yes or Yes" (Note: The Japanese alternative version was released in 2019.) | 2018 | Naive Creative Production | |
| "The Best Thing I Ever Did" (올해 제일 잘한 일) | 2018 | Mustache Films | |
| "Fancy" (Note: The Japanese alternative version was released in 2020.) | 2019 | Naive Creative Production | |
| "Feel Special" | 2019 | Naive Creative Production | |
| "More & More" (Note: The Japanese alternative version was released in 2020.) | 2020 | Naive Creative Production | |
| "I Can't Stop Me" (Note: The Japanese alternative version was released in 2022.) | 2020 | Lee Gi-baek (Tiger Cave Studio) | |
| "Alcohol-Free" | 2021 | Rima Yoon, Dongju Jang (Rigend Film) | |
| "Scientist" (Note: The Japanese alternative version was released in 2022.) | 2021 | Rima Yoon, Dongju Jang (Rigend Film) | |
| "Talk That Talk" | 2022 | Rima Yoon, Dongju Jang (Rigend Film) | |
| "Merry & Happy" (2022 version) | 2022 | —N/a | |
| "Set Me Free" | 2023 | Yang Soon-shik (YSS Studio) | |
| "One Spark" | 2024 | Seo Dong-hyeok (Flipevil) | |

=== Japanese music videos ===
List of Japanese music videos, showing year released and directors
| Title | Year | Director(s) | Ref. |
|---|---|---|---|
| "TT" (Japanese version) | 2017 | Jimmy (BS Pictures) | |
| "One More Time" | 2017 | Naive Creative Production | |
| "Candy Pop" | 2018 | Naive Creative Production; Takahiko Kyōgoku (animation) | |
| "Brand New Girl" | 2018 | Jimmy (BS Pictures) | |
| "Wake Me Up" | 2018 | Jimmy (BS Pictures) | |
| "BDZ" | 2018 | Naive Creative Production | |
| "Happy Happy" | 2019 | Naive Creative Production | |
| "Breakthrough" | 2019 | Naive Creative Production | |
| "Fake & True" | 2019 | Vishop (Vikings League) | |
| "Fanfare" | 2020 | Jakyoung Kim (Flexible Pictures) | |
| "Better" | 2020 | Beomjin (VM Project Architecture) | |
| "Kura Kura" | 2021 | Yoojeong Ko (Edie Ko) | |
| "Perfect World" | 2021 | Yoojeong Ko (Edie Ko) | |
| "Doughnut" | 2021 | Jeong Nuri (COSMO) | |
| "Celebrate" | 2022 | Rima Yoon, Dongju Jang (Rigend Film) | |
| "Hare Hare" | 2023 | Sunny Visual | |
| "Dive" | 2024 | Saccharin Film | |
| "Enemy" | 2025 | Soze | |

=== English music videos ===
List of English music videos, showing year released and directors
| Title | Year | Director(s) | Ref. |
|---|---|---|---|
| "I Want You Back" | 2018 | Jimmy (BS Pictures) | |
| "The Feels" | 2021 | Oui Kim | |
| "Moonlight Sunrise" | 2023 | Kim In-tae (AFF) | |
| "I Got You" | 2024 | Guzza (Kudo) | |
| "Strategy" (featuring Megan Thee Stallion) | 2024 | Lafic | |
| "Strategy" (Twice-Trategy ver.) | 2024 | —N/a | |
| "This Is For" | 2025 | Hyeongjun Park | |
| "Me+You" | 2025 | Hattrick (Sushi Visual) | |

== Films ==
List of films, showing year released and notes
| Title | Year | Ref. |
|---|---|---|
| Twiceland (Note: ScreenX release.) | 2018 | |
| One in a Mill10n | 2025 | |

== Video albums ==
=== Korean video albums ===
List of Korean video albums
| Title | Details |
|---|---|
| Twice TV 2: One In A Million | Released: July 29, 2016; Label: JYP Entertainment; Formats: DVD |
| Twice TV 3: Jeju Island | Released: November 2, 2016; Label: IMBC, KT Music; Formats: DVD |
| Twice TV 4 | Released: May 1, 2017; Label: IMBC, KT Music; Formats: DVD |
| Twice Super Event DVD | Released: August 25, 2017; Label: JYP Entertainment; Formats: DVD |
| Twiceland -The Opening- | Released: January 30, 2018; Label: JYP Entertainment, Play Company; Formats: DVD, Blu-ray |
| Twice TV 5: Twice in Switzerland | Released: January 31, 2018; Label: JYP Entertainment; Formats: DVD |
| Twiceland - The Opening [Encore] | Released: July 19, 2018; Label: JYP Entertainment, Play Company; Formats: DVD, Blu-ray |
| Twice TV 6: Twice in Singapore | Released: September 11, 2018; Label: IMBC; Formats: DVD |
| Twice Fanmeeting Once Begins | Released: December 21, 2018; Label: JYP Entertainment, Play Company; Formats: DVD, Blu-ray |
| Twice TV 2018 | Released: March 18, 2019; Label: JYP Entertainment, Play Company; Formats: DVD |
| Twice 2nd Tour Twiceland Zone 2: Fantasy Park | Released: August 22, 2019; Label: JYP Entertainment, Play Company; Formats: DVD, Blu-ray |
| Twice World Tour 2019 'Twicelights' in Seoul | Released: June 9, 2020; Label: JYP Entertainment, Play Company; Formats: DVD, Blu-ray |
| Twice 4th World Tour 'III' in Seoul | Released: June 24, 2022; Label: JYP Entertainment, Play Company; Formats: DVD, Blu-ray |
| Twice 5th World Tour 'Ready to Be' in Seoul | Released: July 31, 2024; Label: JYP Entertainment, Play Company; Format: DVD, Blu-ray |
| Twice 'This Is For' World Tour in Incheon | Released: July 13, 2026; Label: JYP Entertainment, Play Company; Format: DVD, Blu-ray |

=== Japanese video albums ===
List of Japanese video albums, with selected peak chart positions and sales
| Title | Details | Peak chart positions | | Sales |
| Title | Details | JPN DVD | JPN Blu-ray | Sales |
|---|---|---|---|---|
| Twice Debut Showcase "Touchdown in Japan" | Released: December 20, 2017; Label: Warner Music Japan; Formats: DVD, Blu-ray | 4 | 7 | JPN: 64,269 |
| Twice Dome Tour 2019 "#Dreamday" in Tokyo Dome | Released: March 4, 2020; Label: Warner Music Japan; Formats: DVD, Blu-ray | 1 | 3 | JPN: 57,795 |
| Twice Japan Debut 5th Anniversary "T・W・I・C・E" | Released: May 25, 2022; Label: Warner Music Japan; Formats: DVD, Blu-ray | 2 | 1 | JPN: 34,353 |
| Twice 4th World Tour 'III' in Japan | Released: February 21, 2023; Label: Warner Music Japan; Formats: DVD, Blu-ray | 1 | 4 | JPN: 33,709 |
| Twice 5th World Tour 'Ready to Be' in Japan | Released: April 24, 2024; Label: Warner Music Japan; Formats: DVD, Blu-ray | 2 | 2 | JPN: 39,907 |
| Twice 5th World Tour 'Ready to Be' in Japan Special | Released: March 19, 2025; Label: Warner Music Japan; Formats: DVD, Blu-ray | 2 | 1 | JPN: 34,495 |
| Twice 'This Is For' World Tour in Japan | Released: August 26, 2026; Label: Warner Music Japan; Formats: DVD, Blu-ray | 3 | 5 | JPN: 21,178 |

== DVDs ==
=== Korean DVDs ===
List of Korean DVDs, showing year released
| Title | Year | Ref. |
|---|---|---|
| Page Two Monograph | 2016 | |
| 2017 Season's Greetings | 2016 | |
| Twicecoaster: Lane 1 Monograph | 2017 | |
| Twice 1st Photo Book "One in a Million" | 2017 | |
| Twice Super Event | 2017 | |
| Twicezine: Jeju Island Edition | 2017 | |
| Signal Monograph | 2017 | |
| 2018 Season's Greetings "First Love" | 2017 | |
| Twiceland: The Opening | 2018 | |
| Twicetagram Monograph | 2018 | |
| Merry & Happy Monograph | 2018 | |
| Twiceland: The Opening (Encore) | 2018 | |
| Once Begins Twice Fanmeeting | 2018 | |
| 2019 Season's Greetings "The Roses" | 2018 | |
| Twiceland Zone 2: Fantasy Park | 2019 | |
| Twice World Tour 2019 – Twicelights in Seoul | 2020 | |
| 2021 Season's Greetings "The Moment Forever" | 2020 | |
| 2022 Season's Greetings "Letters To You" | 2021 | |
| Twice 4th World Tour 'III' in Seoul | 2022 | |
| 2023 Season's Greetings "Secret Life@House" | 2022 | |
| Twice 5th World Tour 'Ready to Be' in Seoul | 2024 | |
| Twice 'This Is For' World Tour in Incheon | 2026 | |

=== Japanese DVDs ===
List of Japanese DVDs, showing year released
| Title | Year | Ref. |
|---|---|---|
| Twice Debut Showcase "Touchdown in Japan" | 2017 | |
| 2019 Japan Season's Greetings "Twice Airlines" | 2018 | |
| 2020 Japan Season's Greetings "Illusion" | 2019 | |
| Twice Dome Tour 2019 "#Dreamday" in Tokyo Dome | 2020 | |
| 2021 Japan Season's Greetings "On & Off" | 2020 | |
| 2022 Japan Season's Greetings "Once-Way" | 2021 | |
| Twice Japan Debut 5th Anniversary "T・W・I・C・E" | 2022 | |
| 2023 Japan Season's Greetings "Secret Life@Office" | 2022 | |
| Twice 4th World Tour 'III' in Japan | 2023 | |
| Twice Japan Season's Greetings 2024 "Circuit24" | 2023 | |
| Twice 5th World Tour 'Ready to Be' in Japan | 2024 | |
| Twice 5th World Tour 'Ready to Be' in Japan Special | 2025 | |
| Twice 'This Is For' World Tour in Japan | 2026 | |

== Reality shows ==
=== Korean reality shows ===
List of Korean reality shows, showing premiere date and number of episodes
| Title | Premiere date | Episodes | Ref. |
|---|---|---|---|
| Sixteen | May 5, 2015 | 10 | |
| Twice TV | July 10, 2015 | 5 | |
| Twice TV2 | October 23, 2015 | 10 | |
| Twice's Private Life | March 1, 2016 | 8 | |
| Twice TV Begins | June 29, 2016 | 8 | |
| Twice TV: School Meal Club's Great Adventure | 2016 | 2 | |
| Twice TV3 | April 29, 2016 | 8 | |
| Twice TV4 | October 31, 2016 | 8 | |
| Twice TV Special | 2016 | 6 | |
| Twice – Lost: Time | January 16, 2017 | 21 | |
| Twice TV5: Twice in Switzerland | May 22, 2017 | 24 | |
| Twice TV6 | November 8, 2017 | 12 | |
| Twice TV 2018 | January 13, 2018 | 14 | |
| Twice TV: "What Is Love?" | April 18, 2018 | 10 | |
| Twice TV: "Dance the Night Away" | July 9, 2018 | 5 | |
| Twice TV: "Yes or Yes" | November 12, 2018 | 12 | |
| Twice TV: "The Best Thing I Ever Did" | December 21, 2018 | 2 | |
| Twice TV: "Fancy" | April 30, 2019 | 15 | |
| Twice TV: Tdoong Entertainment | July 5, 2019 | 5 | |
| Twice TV: "Feel Special" | September 29, 2019 | 11 | |
| Time to Twice | April 3, 2020 | 4 | |
| Twice: Seize the Light | April 29, 2020 | 9 | |
| Finding Twice's MBTI | May 4, 2020 | 9 | |
| Time to Twice: Karaoke Battle | May 15, 2020 | 4 | |
| Twice TV: "More & More" | June 9, 2020 | 8 | |
| Time to Twice: The Great Escape | June 26, 2020 | 3 | |
| Time to Twice: Healing Camping | August 7, 2020 | 5 | |
| Time to Twice: Tdoong High School | September 18, 2020 | 6 | |
| Twice TV: "I Can't Stop Me" | November 3, 2020 | 8 | |
| Time to Twice: Crime Scene | November 20, 2020 | 6 | |
| Time to Twice: Twice New Year | January 8, 2021 | 5 | |
| Time to Twice: Twice and the Chocolate Factory | February 26, 2021 | 4 | |
| Time to Twice: Tdoong Entertainment season 2 | April 4, 2021 | 5 | |
| Time to Twice: Yes or No | May 14, 2021 | 4 | |
| Twice TV: "Alcohol-Free" M/V Behind the Scenes | June 22, 2021 | 4 | |
| Time to Twice: Tdoong Forest | July 2, 2021 | 6 | |
| Time to Twice: Tdoong High School season 2 | August 20, 2021 | 5 | |
| Twice TV: "The Feels" M/V Behind the Scenes | October 11, 2021 | 3 | |
| Twice TV: "Scientist" M/V Behind the Scenes | November 22, 2021 | 4 | |
| Time to Twice: Crime Scene season 2 | December 3, 2021 | 4 | |
| Time to Twice: Twice New Year 2022 | January 7, 2022 | 5 | |
| Time to Twice: Tdoong Tour | February 18, 2022 | 5 | |
| Time to Twice: Soulmate | April 8, 2022 | 4 | |
| Time to Twice: Spring Picnic | May 13, 2022 | 5 | |
| Twice TV: "Talk that Talk" M/V Behind the Scenes | September 13, 2022 | 5 | |
| Time to Twice: Tdoong Cooking Battle | September 23, 2022 | 4 | |
| Time to Twice: Y2K Tdoong Show | November 11, 2022 | 3 | |
| Time to Twice: Healing December | December 9, 2022 | 4 | |
| Time to Twice: Twice New Year 2023 | January 13, 2023 | 4 | |
| Twice TV: "Moonlight Sunrise" M/V Behind the Scenes | February 8, 2023 | 2 | |
| Twice TV: "Set Me Free" M/V Behind the Scenes | April 4, 2023 | 4 | |
| Time to Twice: Tdoong High School season 3 | June 23, 2023 | 4 | |
| Time to Twice: Fake Squid Game | December 1, 2023 | 4 | |
| Time to Twice: Death Note | May 10, 2024 | 4 | |
| Time to Twice: Tdoong Workshop | July 12, 2024 | 4 | |
| Time to Twice: Tdoong Pocha | October 11, 2024 | 3 | |
| Time to Twice: The Part-Timer | November 8, 2024 | 3 | |
| Time to Twice: T.T.T. Again | February 14, 2025 | 4 | |
| Time to Twice: Rank Battle | March 21, 2025 | 4 | |
| Time to Twice: ZZIMBANGZ | April 25, 2025 | 3 | |

=== Japanese reality shows ===
List of Japanese reality shows, showing year released, network and notes
| Title | Season | Premiere date | Episodes | Ref. |
|---|---|---|---|---|
| Twice in Hawaii | —N/a | July 19, 2019 | 3 | |
| Twice Channel | 1 | August 21, 2021 | 6 | |
| Twice Channel | 2 | November 21, 2021 | 6 | |
| Twice Channel | 3 | June 28, 2022 | 4 | |
