= Ready to Be World Tour =

2023–2024 concert tour by Twice

- World tour by Twice
- Associated album: Ready to Be; With You-th; Dive
- Start date: April 15, 2023
- End date: July 28, 2024
- Legs: 7
- No. of shows: 23 in Asia; 16 in North America; 5 in Oceania; 5 in Europe; 2 in South America; 51 in total
- Supporting act: Vcha
- Attendance: 1.5 million
- Box office: $78.4 million (Note: Including $54.2 million in 2023, and $24.2 million in 2024.)

Twice concert chronology
- Twice 4th World Tour "III" (2021–2022); Ready to Be World Tour (2023–2024); This Is For World Tour (2025–2026)

The Ready to Be World Tour was the third worldwide concert tour and the fifth overall concert headlined by South Korean girl group Twice, in support of their twelfth extended play Ready to Be (2023). The tour began on April 15, 2023, at the Olympic Gymnastics Arena in Seoul, and concluded on July 28, 2024, at Nissan Stadium in Yokohama, comprising 51 shows in Asia, North America, South America, Oceania and Europe.

== Background ==
On February 21, 2023, JYP Entertainment announced that Twice would embark on their largest world tour so far, revealing 17 initial tour dates in 14 cities across East Asia, Australia, and North America. On March 24, six additional dates in Australia and North America were added after most tickets sold out. The second part of the tour was announced on April 24, with six shows in Southeast Asia and Europe. Two more shows were then added to the Europe leg "due to popular demand". After the second concert in Tokyo on May 21, it was announced that four more shows would be held in Japan in December. On June 8, a second tour date in Singapore was announced due to "overwhelming demand". On June 17, a second show was added in the Philippines, two days after ticket sales were temporarily suspended due to "suspicious activities detected online". A second show was also added in Thailand on June 20.

The third part of the tour was announced on August 28, with an additional concert in Melbourne, Australia, as well as shows in Indonesia, Mexico, and Brazil. On September 7, a second show was added in Brazil after tickets sold out. A second concert date was also added in Mexico after all tickets quickly sold out on September 14. In December, it was announced that a concert at the Allegiant Stadium in Las Vegas would take place on March 16, 2024. That same month, it was announced that four additional concerts would be held in Japan in July 2024, including two at Nissan Stadium. In January 2024, Vcha was announced as the opening act for five concerts in Mexico City, São Paulo, and Las Vegas. In April 2024, two more Tokyo dates were announced.

== Reception ==
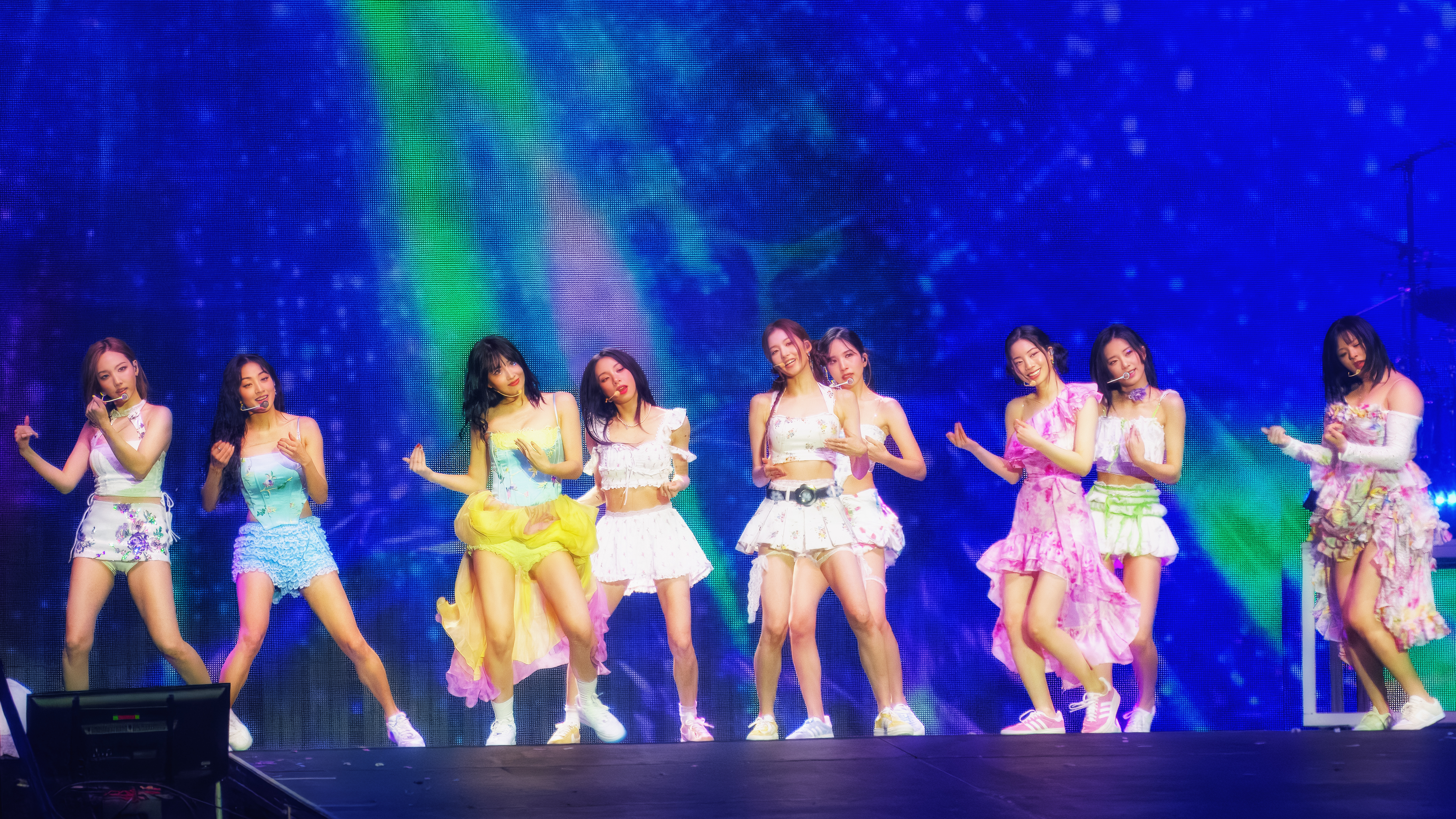
Twice performing "One Spark" at Allegiant Stadium on March 16, 2024

In her review of the SoFi Stadium show, Thania Garcia of Variety praised Twice's "newness", writing, "this year, for the first time, a drummer and guitarist join the girls on stage about mid-way into the set, adding a tinge of freshness to older singles like 'What Is Love?' and 'Queen of Hearts'. And though Twice is known for singing sugary pop songs about love, they certainly deliver one of the edgiest K-pop shows the U.S. has ever seen with Ready to Be." She continued to compliment the group's solo performances and the way the members "unapologetically embrace and celebrate their femininity" while "leaning into their sexuality for the first time".

Similarly, Nylon's Crystal Bell praised the group's solo performances, writing, "it was liberating to finally see the members express themselves freely and give a glimpse of what (possibly) lies ahead." She furthermore complemented the live band version of their hit songs, and called the overall concert atmosphere "silly, carefree, and vibrant".

Reviewing the São Paulo show, Braulio Lorentz from G1 wrote that "Twice's debut in Brazil is proof that the group's K-Pop is even better live", and also praised the structure and visual paraphernalia of the concert, mainly for bringing things little seen in spectacle of this genre: "The team on stage also has a cameraman, who records scenes that go directly to the screen. The idea works [...] giving the impression that we are watching a live clip."

CNN's Arthur Barranco highlighted Twice as "one of the main girl groups in K-pop", praising the delivery of "live vocals, choreography and fireworks" and emphasizing the long wait of the group's Brazilian fandom: "The Allianz Parque Stadium, in São Paulo, was the stage for one of the most anticipated shows by Brazilian k-poppers, who waited nine years to see Twice up close." The journalist also praised the girls' efforts to repay the viewers' immense affection: "Twice tried to repay the fans' love. Member Dahyun, for example, was the one who most risked speaking Portuguese, showing affection for Brazilians."

== Commercial performance ==
Twice became the first K-pop girl group to headline concerts in Japanese stadiums, with four performances in Yanmar Stadium Nagai and Ajinomoto Stadium. The four shows sold 220,000 tickets from more than 1.2 million ticket applications. In the United States, Twice became the first K-pop girl group to sell out and headline SoFi Stadium and MetLife Stadium. On September 7, Twice became the first K-pop girl group to sell out a stadium in São Paulo. Their concert at Marvel Stadium on November 4 was Australia's first K-pop stadium concert, and made Twice the first female group to headline a stadium in Australia. They also became the first K-pop group to headline a concert at the Jakarta International Stadium. In July 2024, Twice became the first foreign female artist to headline a concert at Japan's Nissan Stadium. They were the fourth girl group to hold a concert there, after AKB48, Momoiro Clover Z, and Nogizaka46.

In December 2023, Billboard reported that the tour grossed $54,200,000 with an attendance of 345,000 from 18 reported shows between November 1, 2022 to September 30, 2023. In June 2024, Billboard reported that the tour further grossed $24,200,000 with an attendance of 220,000 from 5 reported shows between October 1, 2023 to March 31, 2024. In total, the tour accumulated over $170 million in revenue with a combined attendance of about 1.5 million.

== Set lists ==
Set list in South Korea

Main Set

1. "Set Me Free"
2. "I Can't Stop Me"
3. "Go Hard"
4. "More & More"
5. "Moonlight Sunrise"
6. "Brave"
7. "Try" (Colbie Caillat cover) (Dahyun solo, with piano)
8. "Done for Me" (Charlie Puth cover) (Tzuyu solo)
9. "New Rules" (Dua Lipa cover) (Sana solo)
10. "Move" (Beyoncé cover) (Momo dance solo)
11. "7 Rings" (Ariana Grande cover) (Mina solo)
12. "Feel Special"
13. "Cry for Me"
14. "Fancy"
15. "The Feels"
16. "My Guitar" (Chaeyoung solo, with guitar)
17. "Nightmare" (Jihyo solo)
18. "Juice" (Lizzo cover) (Jeongyeon solo)
19. "Pop!" (Nayeon solo, dance break version)
20. "Blame It on Me"
21. "Queen of Hearts"
22. "Yes or Yes" / "What Is Love?" / "Cheer Up" / "Likey" / "Knock Knock" / "Scientist" / "Heart Shaker"
23. "Alcohol-Free" (acoustic band version)
24. "Dance the Night Away"
25. "Talk That Talk" (dance break version)
26. "Got the Thrills"
27. "Moonlight"
28. "When We Were Kids"
29. "Crazy Stupid Love"

Encore
April 15 (Day 1)

1. "Signal" (picked by spinning wheel)
2. "Like Ooh-Ahh" (picked by spinning wheel)

April 16 (Day 2)

1. "TT" (picked by spinning wheel)
2. "Wallflower" (picked by spinning wheel)
3. "Basics" (picked by Twice)
4. "Like Ooh-Ahh" (picked by Twice)
Set list in Australia

Main Set

1. "Set Me Free"
2. "I Can't Stop Me"
3. "Go Hard"
4. "More & More"
5. "Moonlight Sunrise"
6. "Brave"
7. "Try" (Colbie Caillat cover) (Dahyun solo, with piano)
8. "Done for Me" (Charlie Puth cover) (Tzuyu solo)
9. "New Rules" (Dua Lipa cover) (Sana solo)
10. "Move" (Beyoncé cover) (Momo dance solo)
11. "7 Rings" (Ariana Grande cover) (Mina solo)
12. "Feel Special"
13. "Cry for Me"
14. "Fancy"
15. "The Feels"
16. "My Guitar" (Chaeyoung solo, with guitar)
17. "Nightmare" / "Killin' Me Good" (Nov 4) (Jihyo solo)
18. "Juice" (Lizzo cover) / "Can't Stop the Feeling!" (Justin Timberlake cover) (Nov 4) (Jeongyeon solo)
19. "Pop!" (Nayeon solo, dance break version)
20. "Queen of Hearts"
21. "Yes or Yes" / "What Is Love?" / "Cheer Up" / "Likey" / "Knock Knock" / "Scientist" / "Heart Shaker"
22. "Alcohol-Free" (acoustic band version)
23. "Dance the Night Away"
24. "Talk That Talk" (dance break version)
25. "When We Were Kids"
26. "Crazy Stupid Love"

Encore
May 2 – Sydney (Day 1)

1. "TT" (picked by Twice)
2. "Candy Pop" (picked by Twice)

May 3 – Sydney (Day 2)

1. "Up No More" (picked by Twice)
2. "Wallflower" (picked by Twice)
3. "Signal" (picked by Twice)

May 6 – Melbourne (Day 1)

1. "Like Ooh-Ahh" (picked by Twice)
2. "Signal" (picked by Twice)

May 7 – Melbourne (Day 2)

1. "Candy Pop" (picked by Twice)
2. "TT" (picked by Twice)
3. "Say Something" (picked by Twice)

November 4 – Melbourne (Encore)

1. "Signal" (picked by spinning wheel)
2. "Perfect World" (picked by Twice)
Set list in Japanese First Leg

Main Set

1. "Set Me Free"
2. "I Can't Stop Me"
3. "Go Hard"
4. "More & More" (Osaka & Tokyo)
5. "Moonlight Sunrise"
6. "Brave"
7. "Try" (Colbie Caillat cover) (Dahyun solo, with piano)
8. "Done for Me" (Charlie Puth cover) (Tzuyu solo)
9. "New Rules" (Dua Lipa cover) (Sana solo)
10. "Move" (Beyoncé cover) (Momo dance solo)
11. "7 Rings" (Ariana Grande cover) (Mina solo)
12. "Feel Special"
13. "Cry for Me"
14. "Fancy"
15. "The Feels"
16. "My Guitar" (Chaeyoung solo, with guitar)
17. "Nightmare" (Osaka & Tokyo) / "Killin' Me Good" (Nagoya & Fukuoka) (Jihyo solo)
18. "Juice" (Osaka & Tokyo) / "Can't Stop the Feeling!" (Justin Timberlake cover) (Nagoya & Fukuoka) (Jeongyeon solo)
19. "Pop!" (Nayeon solo, dance break version)
20. "Queen of Hearts"
21. "Yes or Yes" / "What Is Love?" / "Cheer Up" / "Likey" / "Knock Knock" / "Scientist" / "Heart Shaker"
22. "Alcohol-Free" (acoustic band version)
23. "Dance the Night Away"
24. "Talk That Talk" (dance break version)
25. "Celebrate" (Nagoya & Fukuoka)
26. "Hare Hare"
27. "Dance Again" (Nagoya & Fukuoka)
28. "Happy Happy"
29. "Candy Pop"
30. "When We Were Kids"
31. "Crazy Stupid Love"

Encore
May 13 – Osaka (Day 1)

1. "Celebrate"
2. "Pink Lemonade"
3. "Perfect World"

May 14 – Osaka (Day 2)

1. "BDZ"
2. "Celebrate"
3. "Fanfare"

May 20 – Tokyo (Day 1)

1. "Celebrate"
2. "Pink Lemonade"

May 21 – Tokyo (Day 2)

1. "Strawberry Moon"
2. "BDZ"

December 16 – Nagoya (Day 1)

1. "Wonderful Day"
2. "Merry & Happy"

December 17 – Nagoya (Day 2)

1. "Pink Lemonade"
2. "Wonderful Day"

December 27 – Fukuoka (Day 1)

1. "Breakthrough"
2. "L.O.V.E"

December 28 – Fukuoka (Day 2)

1. "Fanfare"
2. "The Best Thing I Ever Did" (올해 제일 잘한 일)
Set list in USA and Canada

Main Set

1. "Set Me Free" (English ver.)
2. "I Can't Stop Me"
3. "Go Hard"
4. "More & More" (Leg 2023)
5. "Moonlight Sunrise"
6. "Brave"
7. "Try" (Colbie Caillat cover) (Dahyun solo, with piano)
8. "Done for Me" (Charlie Puth cover) (Tzuyu solo)
9. "New Rules" (Dua Lipa cover) (Sana solo)
10. "Move" (Beyoncé cover) (Momo dance solo)
11. "7 Rings" (Ariana Grande cover) (Mina solo)
12. "Feel Special"
13. "Cry for Me"
14. "Fancy"
15. "The Feels"
16. "My Guitar" (Chaeyoung solo, with guitar)
17. "Nightmare" (Leg 2023) / "Killin' Me Good" (Paradise) (Jihyo solo)
18. "Juice" (Lizzo cover) (Leg 2023) / "Can't Stop the Feeling!" (Justin Timberlake cover) (Paradise) (Jeongyeon solo)
19. "Pop!" (Nayeon solo, dance break version)
20. "I Got You" (Paradise)
21. "Queen of Hearts"
22. "Yes or Yes" / "What Is Love?" / "Cheer Up" / "Likey" / "Knock Knock" / "Scientist" / "Heart Shaker"
23. "Alcohol-Free" (acoustic band version)
24. "Dance the Night Away" (Leg 2023) / "One Spark" (Paradise)
25. "Talk That Talk" (dance break version)
26. "When We Were Kids"
27. "Crazy Stupid Love"

Encore
June 10 – Inglewood

1. "Doughnut" (picked by Twice)
2. "Basics" (picked by Twice)
3. "Signal" (picked by Twice)

June 12 – Oakland (Day 1)

1. "Signal" (picked by Twice)
2. "TT" (picked by Twice)

June 13 – Oakland (Day 2)

1. "Blame It on Me" (picked by Twice)
2. "Signal" (picked by Twice)
3. "Basics" (picked by Twice)

June 16 – Tacoma

1. "Doughnut" (picked by Twice)
2. "Like Ooh-Ahh" (picked by Twice)
3. "Basics" (picked by Twice)

June 21 – Arlington

1. "Candy Pop" (picked by Twice)
2. "Got The Thrills" (picked by Twice)
3. "TT" (picked by Twice)

June 24 – Houston (Day 1)

1. "Missing U" (picked by Twice)
2. "TT" (picked by Twice)

June 25 – Houston (Day 2)

1. "Like Ooh-Ahh (picked by Twice)
2. "Candy Pop" (picked by Twice)

June 28 – Chicago (Day 1)

1. "Rollin'" (picked by Twice)
2. "Candy Pop" (picked by Twice)

June 29 – Chicago (Day 2)

1. "Rollin'" (picked by Twice)
2. "Signal" (picked by Twice)

July 2 – Toronto (Day 1)

1. "Like Ooh-Ahh" (picked by Twice)
2. "Celebrate" (picked by Twice)

July 2 – Toronto (Day 2)

1. "Do It Again" (picked by Twice)
2. "Celebrate" (picked by Twice)

July 6 – East Rutherford

1. "Scandal" (picked by Twice)
2. "Like Ooh-Ahh" (picked by Twice)
3. "Firework" (picked by Twice)

July 9 – Atlanta

1. "Firework" (picked by Twice)
2. "Celebrate" (picked by Twice)
3. "TT" (picked by Twice)

March 16 (Once More) – Paradise

1. "Look at Me" (날 바라바라봐) (picked by Twice)
2. "Rush" (picked by Twice)
Set list in Asia

Main Set

1. "Set Me Free" (English ver.)
2. "I Can't Stop Me"
3. "Go Hard"
4. "More & More"(Singapore, Bangkok & Bulacan)
5. "Moonlight Sunrise"
6. "Brave"
7. "Try" (Colbie Caillat cover) (Dahyun solo, with piano)
8. "Done for Me" (Charlie Puth cover) (Tzuyu solo)
9. "New Rules" (Dua Lipa cover) (Sana solo)
10. "Move" (Beyoncé cover) (Momo dance solo)
11. "7 Rings" (Ariana Grande cover) (Mina solo)
12. "Feel Special"
13. "Cry for Me"
14. "Fancy"
15. "The Feels"
16. "My Guitar" (Chaeyoung solo, with guitar)
17. "Killin' Me Good" (Jihyo solo)
18. "Can't Stop the Feeling!" (Justin Timberlake cover) (Jeongyeon solo)
19. "Pop!" (Nayeon solo, dance break version)
20. "Queen of Hearts"
21. "Yes or Yes" / "What Is Love?" / "Cheer Up" / "Likey" / "Knock Knock" / "Scientist" / "Heart Shaker"
22. "Alcohol-Free" (acoustic band version)
23. "Dance the Night Away"
24. "Talk That Talk" (dance break version)
25. "When We Were Kids"
26. "Crazy Stupid Love"

Encore
September 2 (Day 1)

1. "Like Ooh-Ahh" (picked by Twice)
2. "Shot Clock" (picked by Twice)

September 3 (Day 2)

1. "Jelly Jelly" (picked by spinning wheel)
2. "BDZ" (Korean ver.) (picked by Twice)

September 23 - Bangkok (Day 1)

1. "Like Ooh-Ahh" (picked by Twice)
2. "Strawberry" (picked by spinning wheel)

September 24 - Bangkok (Day 2)

1. "Strawberry" (picked by spinning wheel)
2. "Shot Clock" (picked by spinning wheel)

September 30 - Bulacan (Day 1)

1. "Queen of Hearts" (picked by Twice)
2. "BDZ" (Korean ver.) (picked by Twice)
3. "Hot" (picked by spinning wheel)

October 1 - Bulacan (Day 2)

1. "Jelly Jelly" (picked by spinning wheel)
2. "Strawberry" (picked by spinning wheel)
3. "BDZ" (Korean ver.) (picked by Twice)

December 23 - Jakarta

1. "Doughnut" (picked by Twice)
2. "Perfect World" (picked by Twice)
Set list in Europe

Main Set

1. "Set Me Free" (English ver.)
2. "I Can't Stop Me"
3. "Go Hard"
4. "More & More"
5. "Moonlight Sunrise"
6. "Brave"
7. "Try" (Colbie Caillat cover) (Dahyun solo, with piano)
8. "Done for Me" (Charlie Puth cover) (Tzuyu solo)
9. "New Rules" (Dua Lipa cover) (Sana solo)
10. "Move" (Beyoncé cover) (Momo dance solo)
11. "7 Rings" (Ariana Grande cover) (Mina solo)
12. "Feel Special"
13. "Cry for Me"
14. "Fancy"
15. "The Feels"
16. "My Guitar" (Chaeyoung solo, with guitar)
17. "Killin' Me Good" (Jihyo solo)
18. "Can't Stop the Feeling!" (Justin Timberlake cover) (Jeongyeon solo)
19. "Pop!" (Nayeon solo, dance break version)
20. "Queen of Hearts"
21. "Yes or Yes" / "What Is Love?" / "Cheer Up" / "Likey" / "Knock Knock" / "Scientist" / "Heart Shaker"
22. "Alcohol-Free" (acoustic band version)
23. "Dance the Night Away"
24. "Talk That Talk" (dance break version)
25. "When We Were Kids"
26. "Crazy Stupid Love"

Encore
September 7 - London (Day 1)

1. "TT" (picked by spinning wheel)
2. "Signal" (picked by Twice)

September 8 - London (Day 2)

1. "TT" (picked by spinning wheel)
2. "Hare Hare" (picked by Twice)
3. "Espresso" (picked by Twice)

September 11 - Paris

1. "Hare Hare" (picked by spinning wheel)
2. "Signal" (picked by Twice)

September 13 - Berlin (Day 1)

1. "TT" (picked by spinning wheel)
2. "Eye Eye Eyes" (picked by spinning wheel)

September 14 - Berlin (Day 2)

1. "TT" (picked by spinning wheel)
2. "Espresso" (picked by Twice)
Set list in Brazil and Mexico

Main Set

1. "Set Me Free" (English ver.)
2. "I Can't Stop Me"
3. "Go Hard"
4. "Moonlight Sunrise"
5. "Brave"
6. "Try" (Colbie Caillat cover) (Dahyun solo, with piano)
7. "Done for Me" (Charlie Puth cover) (Tzuyu solo)
8. "New Rules" (Dua Lipa cover) (Sana solo)
9. "Move" (Beyoncé cover) (Momo dance solo)
10. "7 Rings" (Ariana Grande cover) (Mina solo)
11. "Feel Special"
12. "Cry for Me"
13. "Fancy"
14. "The Feels"
15. "My Guitar" (Chaeyoung solo, with guitar)
16. "Closer" (Jihyo solo)
17. "Can't Stop the Feeling!" (Justin Timberlake cover) (Jeongyeon solo)
18. "Pop!" (Nayeon solo, dance break version)
19. "I Got You"
20. "Queen of Hearts"
21. "Yes or Yes" / "What Is Love?" / "Cheer Up" / "Likey" / "Knock Knock" / "Scientist" / "Heart Shaker"
22. "Alcohol-Free" (acoustic band version)
23. "Talk That Talk" (dance break version)
24. "When We Were Kids"
25. "Crazy Stupid Love"

February 2 - Mexico City (Day 1)

1. "TT (TAK Remix)" (picked by spinning wheel)
2. "Hello" (picked by spinning wheel)

February 3 - Mexico City (Day 2)

1. "Oxygen" (picked by spinning wheel)
2. "Signal" (picked by spinning wheel)
3. "1, 3, 2" (picked by spinning wheel)

February 6 - São Paulo (Day 1)

1. "Do Not Touch (MiSaMo)" (picked by Twice)
2. "Doughnut" (picked by spinning wheel)

February 7 - São Paulo (Day 2)

1. "I'm Gonna Be a Star" (picked by spinning wheel)
2. "Gone" (picked by spinning wheel)
Final Japanese Leg

Main Set

1. "Perfect World"
2. "Breakthrough"
3. "Go Hard"
4. "Moonlight Sunrise"
5. "Here I Am" (Live debut)
6. "Kawaranai Mono" (Hanako Oku cover) (Dahyun solo, with piano)
7. "Planetarium" (Ai Otsuka cover) (Tzuyu solo)
8. "Behind the Curtain" (MiSaMo)
9. "Do Not Touch" (MiSaMo)
10. "Dive"
11. "Fake & True"
12. "Celebrate"
13. "TT"
14. "One Spark"
15. "Fanfare"
16. "BDZ"
17. "My Guitar" (Chaeyoung solo, with guitar)
18. "Nightmare" (Jihyo solo)
19. "Wherever You Are" (One Ok Rock cover) (Jeongyeon solo)
20. "ABCD" (Nayeon solo, extended version)
21. "I Got You"
22. "Voices of Delight"
23. "Fancy"
24. "Hare Hare" (dancebreak version)

Encore
(Day 1 & 2 at Yanmar Stadium Nagai)

1. "Echoes of Heart"
2. "Knock Knock"
3. "Four-leaf Clover"
4. "Inside of Me"
5. "Dance The Night Away"

(Day 2 at Ajinomoto Stadium) (Note: Day 1 No encore due to caused by weather conditions.)

1. "Peach Soda" (Live Debut)
2. "Look at Me"
3. "Happy Happy
4. "Inside of Me"
5. "Like Ooh-Ahh"

(Day 1 & 2 at Nissan Stadium)

1. "Love Warning" (Live Debut)
2. "Likey"
3. "In the Summer" (Live Debut)
4. "Inside of Me"
5. "Cheer Up"

=== Notes ===
- Jeongyeon and Dahyun were absent from the Tacoma show due to contracting COVID-19.
- Chaeyoung was absent from the Bulacan show due to health issues.

== Tour dates ==
List of shows
Date	City	Country	Venue	Opening act	Attendance	Revenue
April 15, 2023	Seoul	South Korea	KSPO Dome; Beyond Live (Note: April 16 only.)	—N/a	—	—
April 16, 2023	Seoul	South Korea	KSPO Dome; Beyond Live	—N/a	—	—
May 2, 2023	Sydney	Australia	Qudos Bank Arena	—N/a	—	—
May 3, 2023	Sydney	Australia	Qudos Bank Arena	—N/a	—	—
May 6, 2023	Melbourne	Australia	Rod Laver Arena	—N/a	—	—
May 7, 2023	Melbourne	Australia	Rod Laver Arena	—N/a	—	—
May 13, 2023	Osaka	Japan	Yanmar Stadium Nagai	—N/a	220,000	—
May 14, 2023	Osaka	Japan	Yanmar Stadium Nagai	—N/a	220,000	—
May 20, 2023	Tokyo	Japan	Ajinomoto Stadium; Beyond Live / Hulu Japan (Note: May 21 only.)	—N/a	220,000	—
May 21, 2023	Tokyo	Japan	Ajinomoto Stadium; Beyond Live / Hulu Japan	—N/a	220,000	—
June 10, 2023	Inglewood (Note: Labelled as Los Angeles shows in promotional material, disregarding city boundaries.)	United States	SoFi Stadium	—N/a	250,000	$7,966,286
June 12, 2023	Oakland	United States	Oakland Arena	—N/a	250,000	—
June 13, 2023	Oakland	United States	Oakland Arena	—N/a	250,000	—
June 16, 2023	Tacoma (Note: Labelled as Seattle shows in promotional material, disregarding city boundaries.)	United States	Tacoma Dome	—N/a	250,000	—
June 21, 2023	Arlington (Note: Labelled as Dallas shows in promotional material, disregarding city boundaries.)	United States	Globe Life Field	—N/a	250,000	—
June 24, 2023	Houston	United States	Toyota Center	—N/a	250,000	—
June 25, 2023	Houston	United States	Toyota Center	—N/a	250,000	—
June 28, 2023	Chicago	United States	United Center	—N/a	250,000	—
June 29, 2023	Chicago	United States	United Center	—N/a	250,000	—
July 2, 2023	Toronto	Canada	Scotiabank Arena	—N/a	250,000	—
July 3, 2023	Toronto	Canada	Scotiabank Arena	—N/a	250,000	—
July 6, 2023	East Rutherford (Note: Labelled as New York shows in promotional material, disregarding city boundaries.)	United States	MetLife Stadium	—N/a	250,000	$7,557,127
July 9, 2023	Cumberland (Note: Labelled as Atlanta shows in promotional material, disregarding city boundaries.)	United States	Truist Park	—N/a	250,000	—
September 2, 2023	Singapore		Singapore Indoor Stadium	—N/a	9,000	—
September 3, 2023	Singapore		Singapore Indoor Stadium	—N/a	—	—
September 7, 2023	London	England	The O2 Arena	—N/a	—	—
September 8, 2023	London	England	The O2 Arena	—N/a	—	—
September 11, 2023	Paris	France	Accor Arena	—N/a	—	—
September 13, 2023	Berlin	Germany	Mercedes-Benz Arena	—N/a	—	—
September 14, 2023	Berlin	Germany	Mercedes-Benz Arena	—N/a	—	—
September 23, 2023	Pak Kret (Note: Labelled as Bangkok shows in promotional material, disregarding city boundaries.)	Thailand	Impact Arena	—N/a	20,000	—
September 24, 2023	Pak Kret	Thailand	Impact Arena	—N/a	20,000	—
September 30, 2023	Bulacan	Philippines	Philippine Arena	—N/a	81,000	—
October 1, 2023	Bulacan	Philippines	Philippine Arena	—N/a	81,000	—
November 4, 2023	Melbourne	Australia	Marvel Stadium	—N/a	—	—
December 16, 2023	Nagoya	Japan	Vantelin Dome Nagoya	—N/a	150,000 (Note: The attendance figure is combined from the shows held in Nagoya and Fukuoka on December 16, 17, 27, 28, 2023.)	—
December 17, 2023	Nagoya	Japan	Vantelin Dome Nagoya	—N/a	150,000	—
December 23, 2023	Jakarta	Indonesia	Jakarta International Stadium	—N/a	—	—
December 27, 2023	Fukuoka	Japan	Fukuoka PayPay Dome; Hulu Japan (Note: December 28 only.)	—N/a		—
December 28, 2023	Fukuoka	Japan	Fukuoka PayPay Dome; Hulu Japan	—N/a		—
February 2, 2024	Mexico City	Mexico	Foro Sol	Vcha	114,000	$11,100,000
February 3, 2024	Mexico City	Mexico	Foro Sol	Vcha	114,000	$11,100,000
February 6, 2024	São Paulo	Brazil	Allianz Parque	Vcha	66,000	$6,400,000
February 7, 2024	São Paulo	Brazil	Allianz Parque	Vcha	66,000	$6,400,000
March 16, 2024	Paradise (Note: Labelled as Las Vegas in promotional material, disregarding city boundaries.)	United States	Allegiant Stadium	Vcha	39,900	$7,000,000
July 13, 2024	Osaka	Japan	Yanmar Stadium Nagai	—N/a	110,000	—
July 14, 2024	Osaka	Japan	Yanmar Stadium Nagai	—N/a	110,000	—
July 20, 2024	Tokyo	Japan	Ajinomoto Stadium	—N/a	110,000	—
July 21, 2024	Tokyo	Japan	Ajinomoto Stadium	—N/a	110,000	—
July 27, 2024	Yokohama	Japan	Nissan Stadium; Lemino (Note: July 28 only.)	—N/a	140,000	—
July 28, 2024	Yokohama	Japan	Nissan Stadium; Lemino	—N/a	140,000	—
Total					1,500,000	$78.4 million

== See also ==
- List of Twice concert tours
