= List of Hot 100 number-one singles of 2020 (Japan) =

The following is a list of number-one singles on the Billboard Japan Hot 100 chart in 2020.

== Chart history ==
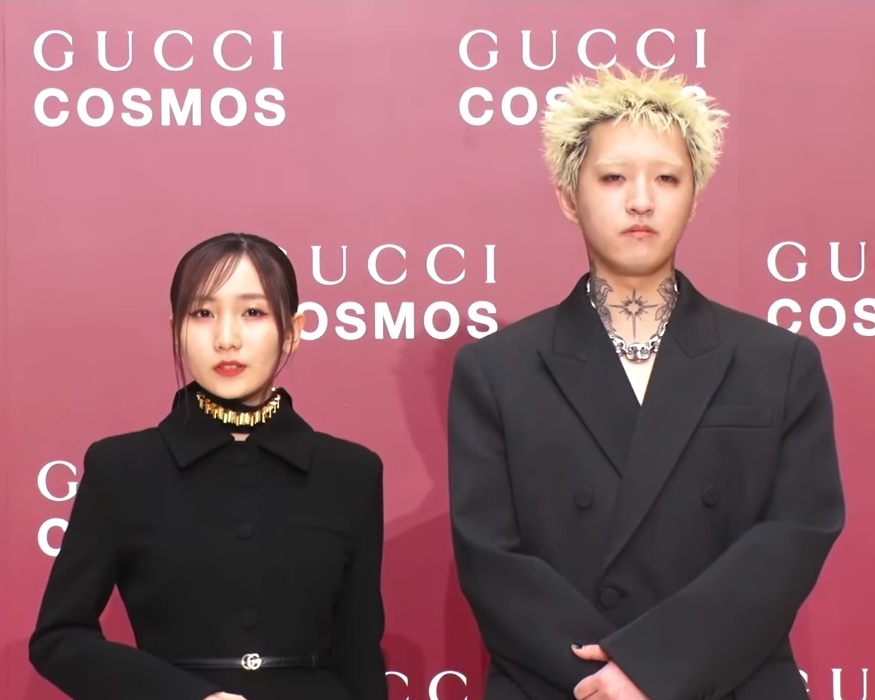
"Yoru ni Kakeru" by Yoasobi topped the chart for six weeks in 2020.The song finished as the year's top Japan Hot 100 song.

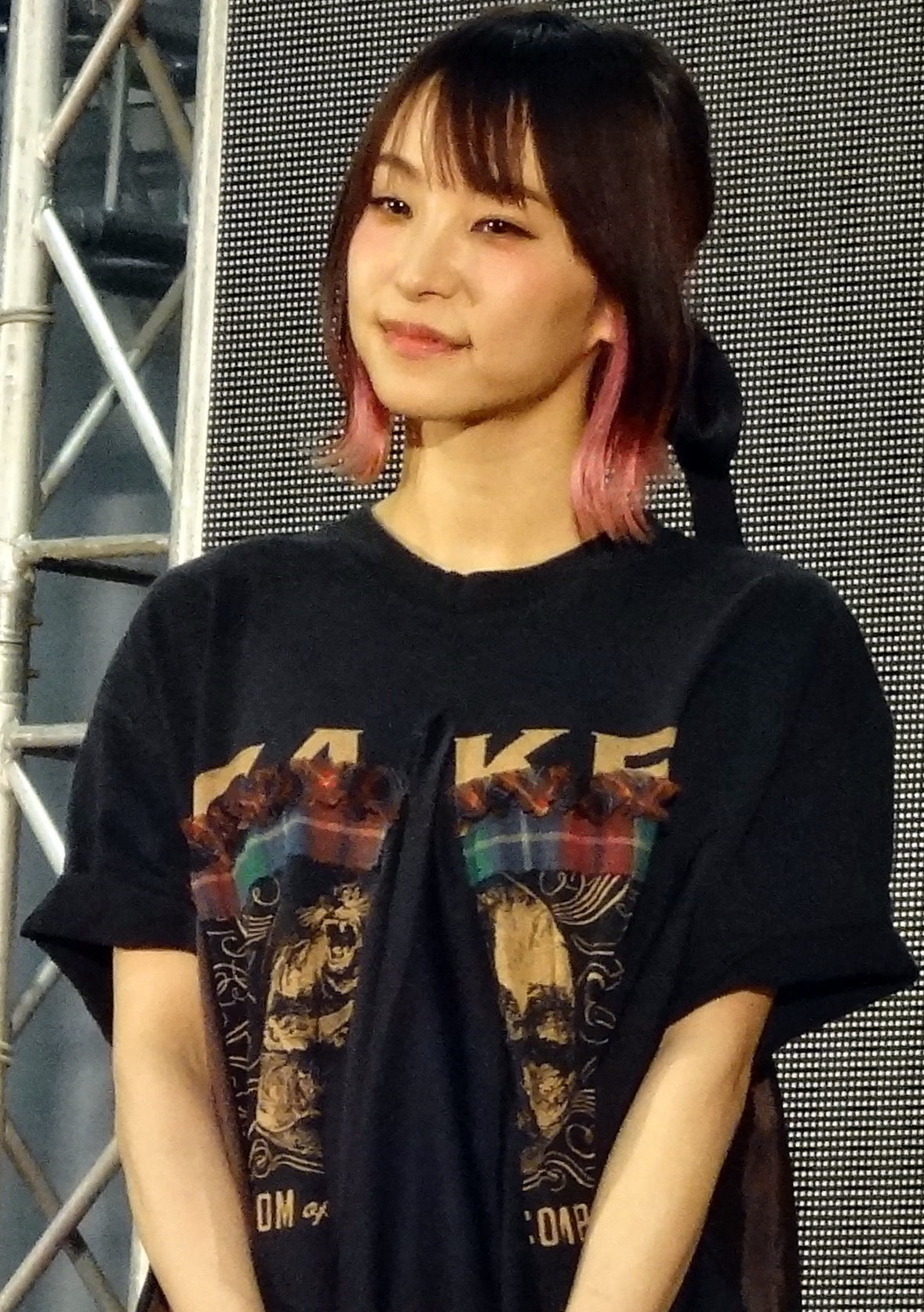
"Homura" by LiSA is the year's longest running number-one song by a solo artist, topping the chart for six weeks.

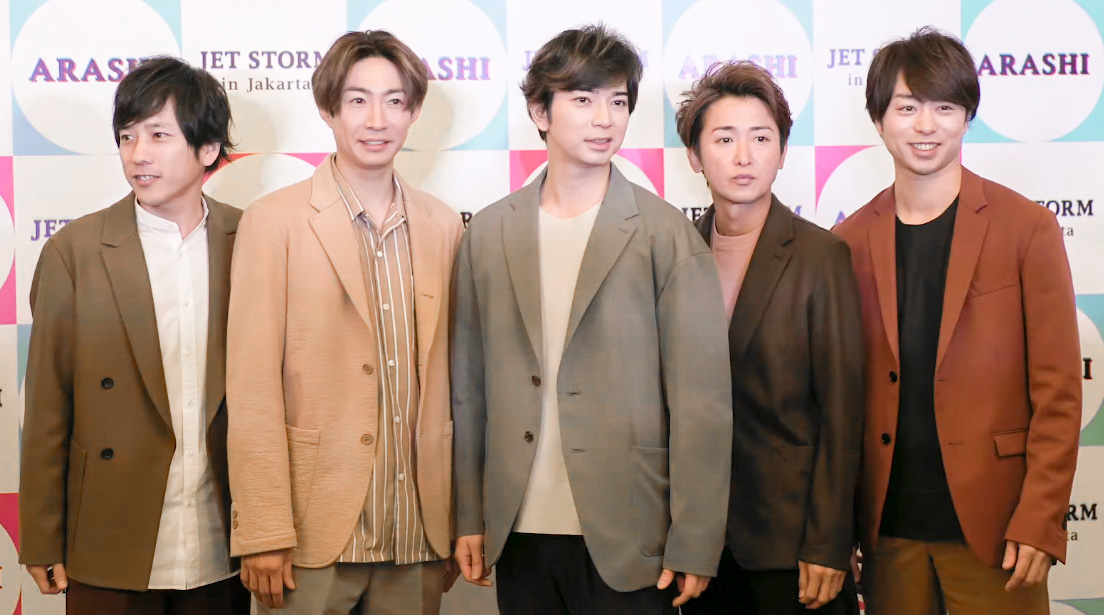
Arashi scored their 37th number-one singles with "Kite" composed by Kenshi Yonezu, expanding the record for the most number-ones songs by a male group.

Issue date	Song	Artist(s)	Ref.
January 6	"Pretender"	Official Hige Dandism	
January 13	"Pretender"	Official Hige Dandism	
January 20	"Pretender"	Official Hige Dandism	
January 27	"Sōyūtoko Aru yo ne?"	SKE48	
February 3	"Imitation Rain"	SixTones	
February 10	"Mubō na Yume wa Sameru Koto ga Nai"	STU48	
February 17	"I Love..."	Official Hige Dandism	
February 24	"I Love..."	Official Hige Dandism	
March 2	"Sonna Koto Nai yo"	Hinatazaka46	
March 9	"I Am"	Hey! Say! JUMP	
March 16	"Infinity"	JO1	
March 23	"I Love..."	Official Hige Dandism	
March 30	"Shitsuren, Arigatō"	AKB48	
April 6	"Shiawase no Hogoshoku"	Nogizaka46	
April 13	"Fallin' Flower"	Seventeen	
April 20	"I Love..."	Official Hige Dandism	
April 27	"I Love..."	Official Hige Dandism	
May 4	"3-2"	HKT48	
May 11	"I Love..."	Official Hige Dandism	
May 18	"I Love..."	Official Hige Dandism	
May 25	"Kōsui"	Eito	
June 1	"Yoru ni Kakeru"	Yoasobi	
June 8	"Yoru ni Kakeru"	Yoasobi	
June 15	"Yoru ni Kakeru"	Yoasobi	
June 22	"Mazy Night"	King & Prince	
June 29	"Kanzai Boya"	KinKi Kids	
July 6	"Shōko"	Johnny's West	
July 13	"Last Mermaid..."	Hey! Say! JUMP	
July 20	"Fanfare"	Twice	
July 27	"Yoru ni Kakeru"	Yoasobi	
August 3	"Navigator"	SixTones	
August 10	"Kite"	Arashi	
August 17	"Run"	Sexy Zone	
August 24	"Smile"	Twenty★Twenty	
August 31	"Re:Live"	Kanjani Eight	
September 7	"Oh-Eh-Oh"	JO1	
September 14	"Omoidaseru Koi wo Shiyō"	STU48	
September 21	"Yoru ni Kakeru"	Yoasobi	
September 28	"Endless Summer"	Kis-My-Ft2	
October 5	"Yoru ni Kakeru"	Yoasobi	
October 12	"Your Song"	Hey! Say! JUMP	
October 19	"Kissin' My Lips"	Snow Man	
October 26	"Homura"	LiSA	
November 2	"Homura"	LiSA	
November 9	"Homura"	LiSA	
November 16	"Homura"	LiSA	
November 23	"New Era"	SixTones	
November 30	"Homura"	LiSA	
December 7	"Homura"	LiSA	
December 14	"Step and a Step"	NiziU	
December 21	"Nobody's Fault"	Sakurazaka46	
December 28	"I Promise"	King & Prince	
