= Twice4 =

2022 compilation album by Twice

#Twice4
- Standard edition cover

Compilation album by Twice
- Released: March 16, 2022
- Genre: J-pop; K-pop
- Language: Japanese; Korean; English
- Label: Warner Music Japan

Twice chronology
Formula of Love: O+T=<3 (2021)	#Twice4 (2022)	Celebrate (2022)

Singles from #Twice4
- 1. "Scientist (Japanese ver)" Released: March 2, 2022

#Twice4 (Hashtag Twice4) is the fourth Japanese compilation album released by South Korean girl group Twice. The album consists of Japanese and Korean versions of "I Can't Stop Me", "Cry for Me", "Alcohol-Free", and "Scientist". It was released on March 16, 2022, under Warner Music Japan.

== Background and release ==
On January 31, 2022, JYP Entertainment announced in an official statement that Twice's fourth compilation album was set to be released on March 16. The Japanese version of "Scientist" was released as a promotional single for the album on March 2, 2022.

The album was officially released on March 16, 2022. The digital and streaming version of #Twice4 was released in EP format, only containing Japanese-language tracks.

== Commercial performance ==
Following its release, #Twice4 debuted atop the Oricon Albums Chart, becoming the group's eighth number-one album on the chart. Twice became the first foreign female artist to achieve this feat, breaking the record set by BoA. The album also peaked at number one on the Billboard Japan Hot Albums chart.

== Track listing ==
#Twice4 — Standard edition
No.	Title	Lyrics	Length
1.	"I Can't Stop Me" (Japanese version)	Natsumi Watanabe	3:30
2.	"Cry for Me" (Japanese version)	Risa Horie	3:28
3.	"Alcohol-Free" (Japanese version)	Yuki Kokubo	3:34
4.	"Scientist" (Japanese version)	Yuki Kokubo	3:17
5.	"I Can't Stop Me"
6.	"Cry for Me"
7.	"Alcohol-Free"
8.	"Scientist"

#Twice4 — Limited edition B (DVD)
No.	Title	Length
1.	"More & More (Japanese ver.) Music Video"
2.	"I Can't Stop Me (Japanese ver.) Music Video"
3.	"Scientist (Japanese ver.) Music Video"
4.	"More & More Music Video"
5.	"I Can't Stop Me Music Video"
6.	"Scientist Music Video"
7.	"More & More (Japanese ver.) Music Video Making Movie"
8.	"I Can't Stop Me (Japanese ver.) Music Video Making Movie"
9.	"Scientist (Japanese ver.) Music Video Making Movie"
10.	"Twice4 Jacket Shooting Making Movie"

#Twice4 — Digital and streaming edition
No.	Title	Length
1.	"I Can't Stop Me" (Japanese version)	3:30
2.	"Cry for Me" (Japanese version)	3:28
3.	"Alcohol-Free" (Japanese version)	3:34
4.	"Scientist" (Japanese version)	3:17

== Charts ==
=== Weekly charts ===
Weekly chart performance for #Twice4
Chart (2022)	Peak position
Japanese Albums (Oricon)	1
Japanese Combined Albums (Oricon)	1
Japanese Hot Albums (Billboard Japan)	1

=== Monthly charts ===
Monthly chart performance for #Twice4
Chart (2022)	Peak position
Japanese Albums (Oricon)	4

=== Year-end charts ===
Year-end chart performance for #Twice4
Chart (2022)	Position
Japanese Albums (Oricon)	46
Japanese Hot Albums (Billboard Japan)	49

== Certifications ==
Region	Certification	Certified units/sales
Japan (RIAJ)	Gold	100,000^{^}
^{^} Shipments figures based on certification alone.

== Release history ==
Release dates and formats for #Twice4
Region	Date	Format(s)	Edition	Label	Ref.
Various	March 16, 2022	Digital download; streaming	Standard Edition	Warner Music Japan	
Japan	March 16, 2022	CD	Standard Edition	Warner Music Japan	
Japan	March 16, 2022	CD + Photo Book	Limited Edition A	Warner Music Japan	
Japan	March 16, 2022	CD + DVD	Limited Edition B	Warner Music Japan	
Japan	September 27, 2023	Vinyl	Limited Edition	Warner Music Japan	
