= Perfect World (Twice album) =

2021 studio album by Twice

- Digital cover

Studio album by Twice
- Released: July 28, 2021
- Genre: J-pop
- Length: 37:00
- Languages: Japanese; English
- Label: Warner Music Japan

Twice chronology
Taste of Love (2021)	Perfect World (2021)	Formula of Love: O+T=<3 (2021)

Singles from Perfect World
- 1. "Fanfare" Released: July 8, 2020; 2. "Better" Released: November 18, 2020; 3. "Kura Kura" Released: May 12, 2021; 4. "Perfect World" Released: June 29, 2021

Perfect World is the third Japanese studio album (fifth overall) by South Korean girl group Twice. It was released on July 28, 2021, by Warner Music Japan. The album features 10 tracks, including the title track, "Perfect World", and three previously released singles, "Fanfare", "Better", and "Kura Kura". Lyrically, the album expresses various forms of love, including love for fans, family, and friends.

== Release and promotion ==
On May 19, 2021, a photo teaser was posted on Twice's Japanese social media accounts. On June 22, the track listing was revealed. Two music video teasers for the title track, "Perfect World", were posted before its release on June 29. The album was released on July 28, and the group held an online event to commemorate the release. To promote the album, they performed "Perfect World" on Music Station Summer Fes, on August 20. Jeongyeon was absent from both events, as she was taking a health-related hiatus due to panic disorder.

== Commercial performance ==
Perfect World debuted at number 2 on the Oricon Albums Chart for the chart issue dated July 26 – August 1, 2021. The album debuted at number 1 on the Billboard Japan Hot Albums for the chart issue dated August 4, 2021.

== Track listing ==
Track listing for Perfect World
No.	Title	Lyrics	Music	Arrangement	Length
1.	"Perfect World"	Risa Horie	Woo Min Lee "collapsedone"; Justin Reinstein; JJean; LACND	Lee; LACND	3:03
2.	"Better"	Lauren Kaori; Mio Jorakuji	Eunsol; Kaori	Eunsol	3:44
3.	"Good at Love"	Mayu Wakisaka	Deez; Yunsu; SAAY	Deez; Yunsu	3:51
4.	"Fanfare"	Chiemi	Louise Frick Sveen; Atsushi Shimada; Kenichi Sakamuro	Shimada; Sakamuro	3:40
5.	"Kura Kura"	J. Y. Park "The Asiansoul"; Yu-ki Kokubo	UTA	UTA	3:48
6.	"Four-leaf Clover"	Wakisaka	earattack; eniac; Anna Timgren	earattack; eniac	3:47
7.	"In the Summer"	Yuka Matsumoto	Andy Gilbert; Nicole Simpson; Charlotte Churchman; Mark Angelico Thomson	Gilbert; Simpson; Churchman; Thomson	3:30
8.	"Pieces of Love"	Kaori	Isaac Han; Ejae; Albin Nordqvist; Walter Pok; Aaron Kim	Han; Pok; Kim	4:01
9.	"Thank You, Family"	Jam9	B-Rock; J-Lin	B-Rock; J-Lin	3:17
10.	"Promise"	Karen Yamaguchi	minGtion; Karen Poole; Ellen Berg	minGtion	4:19
Total length:					37:00

First press limited edition A DVD
No.	Title	Length
1.	"Fanfare" (Music Video)
2.	"Better" (Music Video)
3.	"Better" (Music Video Lip sync ver.)
4.	"Kura Kura" (Music Video)
5.	"Kura Kura" (Music Video another ver.)
6.	"Perfect World" (Music Video Making Movie)
7.	"Perfect World" (Jacket Shooting Making Movie)

== Personnel ==
Credits are adapted from the album's liner notes.

=== Musicians ===
- Twice – vocals, background vocals
- Woo Min Lee "collapsedone" – all instruments, guitar, synthesizer (1)
- LACND – all instruments, synthesizer (1)
- Swan Yoo – guitar (1)
- Sayulee – background vocals (1, 3, 5–7, 9–10)
- Perrie – vocal director (1)
- Eunsol – all instruments (2)
- Kate – background vocals (2, 4)
- Armadillo – vocal director (2)
- Deez – all instruments, background vocals (3)
- Yunsu – all instruments (3)
- SAAY – background vocals (3)
- Sophia Pae – vocal director (3, 6–10)
- Atsushi Shimada – all instruments (4)
- Kenichi Sakamuro – all instruments (4)
- UTA – all instruments (5)
- Red Anne – vocal director (5)
- Kim Jong-sung – guitar (6)
- earattack – all instruments, vocal director (6)
- eniac – all instruments (6)
- Andy Gilbert – all instruments (7)
- Isaac Han – synthesizer, drums, vocal director (8)
- Walter Pok – bass (8)
- Jinwon Lee – guitar (8)
- YHEL – background vocals (8)
- Aaron Kim – vocal director (8)
- B-Rock – piano (9)
- J-Lin – synthesizer (9)
- minGtion – all instruments, vocal director (10)

=== Technical ===
- Woo Min Lee "collapsedone" – digital editing (1)
- Goo Hye-jin – recording (1, 8)
- Tony Maserati – mixing (1–2, 5)
- Kwon Nam-woo – mastering (1, 3, 6–10)
- Park Eun-jung – recording (2), mixing (9–10)
- Chris Gehringer – mastering (2, 5)
- Choi Hye-jin – recording (3–4, 6–10)
- KayOne Lee – digital editing (3, 9)
- Deez – digital editing (3)
- Lim Hong-jin – mixing (3, 8)
- Naoki Yamada – mixing (4, 7)
- Park Jung-un – mastering (4)
- Eom Se-hee – recording (5)
- earattack – recording (6)
- Lee Sang-yeop – recording (6, 10)
- Jiyoung Shin NYC – digital editing (6)
- Lee Tae-sub – mixing (6)
- Ashe Ahn – digital editing (8)
- minGtion – digital editing (10)

== Charts ==
=== Weekly charts ===
Weekly chart performance for Perfect World
Chart (2021)	Peak position
Japan Hot Albums (Billboard Japan)	1
Japanese Albums (Oricon)	2

=== Year-end charts ===
Year-end chart performance for Perfect World
Chart (2021)	Position
Japan Hot Albums (Billboard Japan)	48
Japanese Albums (Oricon)	43

== Certifications ==
Region	Certification	Certified units/sales
Japan (RIAJ)	Gold	100,000^{^}
^{^} Shipments figures based on certification alone.

== Release history ==
Release dates and formats for Perfect World
Region	Date	Format(s)	Edition	Label	Ref.
Various	July 28, 2021	Digital download; streaming	Regular Edition	Warner Music Japan	
Japan	July 28, 2021	CD	Regular Edition	Warner Music Japan	
Japan	July 28, 2021	CD + DVD	Limited Edition A	Warner Music Japan	
Japan	July 28, 2021	CD	Limited Edition B	Warner Music Japan	
Japan	December 6, 2023	Vinyl	Limited Edition	Warner Music Japan	

== See also ==
- List of Billboard Japan Hot Albums number ones of 2021
