= Taste of Love (EP) =

2021 extended play by Twice

- Digital cover

EP by Twice
- Released: June 11, 2021
- Genres: K-pop; dance-pop
- Length: 17:21
- Languages: Korean; English
- Labels: JYP; Republic
- Producers: Lee Hae-sol; Red Triangle; Erik Smaaland; Kristoffer Tømmerbakke; Bloodline; Lee Hyun-do; Ronny Svendsen

Twice chronology
Eyes Wide Open (2020)	Taste of Love (2021)	Perfect World (2021)

Singles from Taste of Love
- 1. "Alcohol-Free" Released: June 9, 2021

Taste of Love is the tenth extended play by South Korean girl group Twice. It was released on June 11, 2021, through JYP Entertainment and Republic Records. Marketed as the group's tenth "mini album" release, it consists of six tracks, including the lead single "Alcohol-Free".

== Background ==
On April 19, 2021, it was reported that Twice were in the final stages of preparing for their comeback slated for June and had plans of filming a music video on Jeju Island. The reports were officially confirmed by the group's Korean label, JYP Entertainment, sharing that official details would be released along with a fixed schedule. It is the group's first comeback as a nine-piece group after member Jeongyeon took a break from activities due to anxiety issues. The lead single, "Alcohol-Free", was pre-released on June 9.

== Composition ==
Taste of Love is a 6-track summer-themed EP that features various genres such as hip hop and bossa nova. The opening track and lead single, "Alcohol-Free", recounts the magical moments of falling in love while comparing it to the feeling of getting drunk. It was written by J. Y. Park and Lee Hae-sol. The seventh track "Cry for Me" (English ver.) was released only in physical editions of "Taste of Love".

== Release and promotion ==
Taste of Love was released worldwide on June 11, 2021, through JYP Entertainment and Republic Records. In celebration of the comeback, the group held an online live broadcast before the release of "Alcohol-Free" to talk about the album, the preparations, and the behind-the-scenes. The EP was preceded by its lead single "Alcohol-Free" and its music video, which was released on June 9, 2021.

=== Marketing ===
On May 3, Twice released the first poster for their upcoming EP, Taste of Love, through the group's various social media accounts. On May 9, a preview of the physical album content was shared and pre-orders began the following day. On May 31, the EP's tracklist was posted along with the album trailer. A series of group teaser images were unveiled on Twice's social media accounts on May 21, while individual teaser images were released from June 1 to 3. On June 7 and 8, the music video teasers for "Alcohol-Free" were published. An album preview with snippets of the EP's tracks was uploaded on June 9. Twice appeared on Melon Station's Today's Music and shared stories behind the making of the EP on June 11. On the same day, Twice released an exclusive playlist on Spotify, guiding listeners through the group's creative process track-by-track.

=== Live performances ===
Twice performed "Alcohol-Free" for the first time on The Ellen DeGeneres Show on June 9. They then began performing the song on South Korean music shows, starting with M Countdown on June 10. This was followed by performances on Music Bank, Show! Music Core, and Inkigayo.

== Critical reception ==
Professional ratings
Aggregate scores
Source	Rating
Metacritic	77/100
Review scores
Source	Rating
AllMusic	4/5 stars
Beats Per Minute	75%
IZM	2.5/5 stars
NME	4/5 stars
Pitchfork	7.3/10
PopMatters	6/10

Upon its release, Taste of Love received positive responses from music critics, who praised Twice's musical growth towards a more mature sound while maintaining their signature catchiness. On Metacritic, which assigns a normalized score out of 100 to ratings from publications, the album received a mean score of 77 based on 5 reviews, indicating "generally favorable reviews".

AllMusic's David Crone called Taste of Love a "bundle of summer anthems with the vivid emotions of summertime passion", which comes as a result of its production, "swooning vocals", and the "breezy yet seductive sonic direction". It was given a 75 out of 100 rating by Beats Per Minute, citing that it is "a set of six slickly-produced songs that take place from sunset into the hazy summer night". In a 7.3 out of ten review for Pitchfork, Joshua Minsoo Kim said that it overflows with "moments of clear, magnetic confidence", and said that the group's devotion to breeziness cements it as one of K-pop's best summer albums.

Angela Patricia Suacillo of NME praised the group's versatility in concept execution and vocal performances. Describing it as an "upbeat, groovy exploration", the reviewer called it one of Twice's "more powerful" releases for showing their growth as artists and involvement in the creative process, yet criticized "Alcohol-Free" for lacking excitement. Similarly, IZM critic Kim Seong-yeop found "Alcohol-Free" lackluster, saying "the simple melody leaves a boring taste", however, the critic was more optimistic of the b-side tracks. In a mixed review, Ana Clara Ribeiro of PopMatters noted that while Taste of Love is a good album, it does not have "enough 'wow' for its own good".

=== Year-end lists ===
Taste of Love on year-end lists
Critic/Publication	List	Rank	Ref.
Beats Per Minute	Top 20 EPs of 2021	Placed	
Rolling Stone India	10 Best K-pop Albums of 2021	7	
Omelete	15 Best K-pop Albums of the Year	15	
Pitchfork	Top Albums and Songs of 2021 - Readers' Poll	4	

== Commercial performance ==
Taste of Love debuted on the weekly Gaon Album Chart with a number 2 position. On June 11, it was reported that it had surpassed 530,000 pre-order sales, becoming a half-million seller before its release and their third release to surpass 500,000 sales. In the United States, Taste of Love debuted at number six on the Billboard 200 chart with 46,000 album-equivalent units, of which 3,000 were calculated from the album's 5.09 million on-demand streams, while 43,000 were pure sales. It was the group's third release to enter the chart and their highest peak. Moreover, the EP claimed the top spot on both Billboard World Albums and Top Album Sales charts, earning their second No. 1 in the former chart. Selling over 500,000 copies, the EP certified double platinum by the Korea Music Content Association (KMCA) in August 2021.

== Track listing ==
Track listing for Taste of Love
No.	Title	Lyrics	Music	Arrangement	Length
1.	"Alcohol-Free"	J. Y. Park "The Asiansoul"	Park	Park; Lee Hae-sol	3:30
2.	"First Time"	Jihyo	Rick Parkhouse; George Tizzard; Jade Thirlwall; Sophie "Frances" Cooke	Red Triangle	3:02
3.	"Scandal"	Dahyun	Kristoffer Tømmerbakke; Erik Smaaland; Alida Garpestad Peck	Erik Smaaland; Kristoffer Tømmerbakke	2:43
4.	"Conversation"	Sana	Chris Mears; Robbie McDade; Rebbi James	Bloodline	2:27
5.	"Baby Blue Love"	Nayeon	Karen Poole; Anne Judith Wik; Ronny Vidar Svendsen; Nermin Harambašić	Ronny Svendsen (Dsign Music)	2:46
6.	"SOS"	Dahyun	Lee Hyun-do; Chloe Latimer; Glow	Lee Hyun-do	2:53
Total length:					17:21

Physical edition track
No.	Title	Lyrics	Music	Arrangement	Length
7.	"Cry for Me" (English version)	Sophia Pae (Note: Signifies a translator.); Heize; Park	Ryan Tedder; Melanie Joy Fontana; Michel "Lindgren" Schulz; A Wright	Lindgren	3:24
Total length:					20:45

== Personnel ==
Credits adapted from Melon and album liner notes.

=== Musicians ===
- Twice – vocals (all tracks)
- Distract – background vocals (tracks 1–2)
- Go Tae-young – guitar (track 6)
- Ham Chun-ho – guitar (track 1)
- Kim Yeon-seo – background vocals (tracks 3–5)
- Lee Hae-sol – instrumentation (track 1)
- Lee Hyun-do – keyboard (track 6)
- Lee Na-il – string arranger and conductor (track 1)
- On the String – strings (track 1)
- Sophia Pae – background vocals (tracks 1–2, 6–7)
- J. Y. Park "The Asiansoul" – instrumentation (track 1)
- Rick Parkhouse – bass (track 2)
- George Tizzard – guitar, keyboard (track 2)

=== Technical ===
- Eastbeam – vocal editing (track 6)
- Eom Se-hee – recording (tracks 1, 4–6)
- Fabiotheasian – vocal editing (track 4)
- Chris Gehringer – mastering (track 7)
- Im Hong-jin – mixing (tracks 2, 4)
- Joo Ye-chan – recording assistant (track 1)
- Ku Hye-jin – recording (tracks 4–5)
- Kwon Nam-woo – mastering (tracks 1–6)
- Lee Hae-sol – programming (track 1)
- Lee Hyun-do – programming (track 6)
- Lee Sang-yeop – digital editing, mixing engineering (tracks 1, 7), recording (tracks 2, 4–7)
- Lee Tae-seop – mixing (tracks 1, 6–7)
- Oh Seong-geun – strings recording (track 1)
- Sophia Pae – vocal director (track 7)
- Park Eun-jung – mixing (tracks 3, 5), recording (tracks 1, 3)
- J. Y. Park "The Asiansoul" – vocal director, digital editing, vocal editing (track 1)
- Rick Parkhouse – programming (track 2)
- Jiyoung Shin – additional editing (tracks 2–3, 7)
- Sim Eun-jee – vocal director, digital editing (tracks 1–2), vocal editing (track 1)

== Charts ==
=== Weekly charts ===
Weekly chart performance for Taste of Love
Chart (2021)	Peak position
Belgian Albums (Ultratop Flanders)	28
Belgian Albums (Ultratop Wallonia)	130
Canadian Albums (Billboard)	38
Finnish Albums (Suomen virallinen lista)	20
Hungarian Albums (MAHASZ)	33
Japan Hot Albums (Billboard Japan)	15
Japanese Albums (Oricon)	2
South Korean Albums (Gaon)	2
UK Album Downloads (Official Charts)	23
US Billboard 200	6
US Indie Store Album Sales (Billboard)	4
US World Albums (Billboard)	1

=== Year-end charts ===
Year-end chart performance for Taste of Love
Chart (2021)	Position
Japanese Albums (Oricon)	49
South Korean Albums (Gaon)	24
US World Albums (Billboard)	15

== Certifications and sales ==
Certifications for Taste of Love
Region	Certification	Certified units/sales
Japan	—	61,760
South Korea (KMCA)	2× Platinum	559,093
United States	—	43,000

== Accolades ==
Nominations for Taste of Love
Year	Award	Category	Result	Ref.
2022	36th Golden Disc Awards	Album Bonsang	Nominated	

== Release history ==
Release formats for Taste of Love
Region	Date	Format	Label	Ref.
Various	June 11, 2021	CD; digital download; streaming	JYP; Republic	

== See also ==
- List of certified albums in South Korea
