= Cry for Me (Twice song) =

2020 single by Twice

Single by Twice
- Language: Korean
- Released: December 18, 2020
- Length: 3:24
- Label: JYP; Republic
- Composers: Ryan Tedder; Melanie Joy Fontana; Michel "Lindgren" Schulz; A Wright
- Lyricists: Park Jin-young; Heize

Twice singles chronology
"Better" (2020)	"Cry for Me" (2020)	"Kura Kura" (2021)

Audio video
- "Cry for Me" on YouTube

"Cry for Me" (stylized in all caps) is a song recorded by South Korean girl group Twice. The song was released by JYP Entertainment on December 18, 2020.

== Background and release ==
On December 6, 2020, Twice revealed and performed the song for the first time during the 2020 Mnet Asian Music Awards. In a 2022 documentary released by Mnet, Jihyo said that their agency, JYP Entertainment, was hesitant to release "Cry for Me", but let Twice perform it at the 2020 Mnet Asian Music Awards after the members insisted.

On December 10, JYP Entertainment announced the release of the song via Twice's Twitter account. The next day, JYPE announced the date of the release of the song on December 18 with a new teaser image as well as the date of the concept photo for the song. On December 14, the concept film for "Cry for Me" was uploaded on JYP Entertainment's YouTube channel. One day later, the first concept photos of members Momo and Mina were revealed. On December 16, JYPE released the concept photos of Dahyun and Jihyo. Then followed the concept photos of members Sana and Tzuyu on December 17. Finally, the last concept photos of Chaeyoung and Nayeon were revealed on December 18. Jeongyeon's concept photo was never revealed as she was on hiatus due to her anxiety.

"Cry for Me" was released on December 18, 2020, for digital download and streaming in various countries. On April 28, 2021, Twice performed the song on The Kelly Clarkson Show.

== English and Japanese versions ==
=== English version ===
The English version of "Cry for Me" was released on June 11, 2021, as the seventh track of the physical edition of Twice's tenth extended play Taste of Love. On November 22, 2023, it was released on streaming platforms as part of Twice's The Remixes album.

=== Japanese version ===
Twice released the fourth compilation album #Twice4, on March 16, 2022, which includes both Korean and Japanese-language versions of "Cry for Me". The Japanese lyrics were written by Risa Horie.

== Composition ==
"Cry for Me" was written by Park Jin-young (J.Y. Park) and Heize, composed by Ryan Tedder, Melanie Joy Fontana, Michel "Lindgren" Schulz and A Wright, and arranged by Lindgren. It is in the key of B-flat major and has a fast tempo of 145 beats per minute, with most of the song following a Cm—F—B♭—D7 chord progression. It runs for a length of three minutes and 24 seconds. Lyrically, it describes a toxic love-hate relationship. JYP Entertainment stated that the song is about "those who walk a thin line between love and hate" and centers on "the moments in which the extremes of love and hate coexist".

== Credits and personnel ==
Credits adapted from Tidal.

- Twice – lead vocals
- Park Jin-young – lyricist
- Heize – lyricist
- A Wright – composer
- Melanie Joy Fontana – composer
- Michel "Lindgren" Schulz – composer
- Ryan Tedder – composer
- Heidi Wang – assistant mixing manager
- Sophia Pae – backing vocals, vocal arranger
- Chris Gehringer – mastering engineer
- Kwon Nam-woo – mastering engineer
- Lee Sang-yeop – recording engineer
- Josh Gudwin – mixing engineer
- Lee Tae-sub – mixing engineer
- Lee Sang-yeop – recording engineer
- Jiyoung Shin NYC – sound editor
- Armadillo – vocal arranger

== Charts ==
Chart performance for "Cry for Me"
Chart (2020–2021)	Peak position
Global Excl. US (Billboard)	122
Japan Hot 100 (Billboard)	53
New Zealand Hot Singles (RMNZ)	10
Singapore (RIAS)	12
South Korea (Gaon)	164
US World Digital Song Sales (Billboard)	1

== Certifications ==
Streaming certifications for "Cry for Me"
Region	Certification	Certified units/sales
Japan (RIAJ)	Gold	50,000,000^{†}
^{†} Streaming-only figures based on certification alone.

== Release history ==
Release dates and formats for "Cry for Me"
Region	Date	Format	Label	Ref.
Various	December 18, 2020	Digital download; streaming	JYP; Republic	
