= Hare Hare =

2023 single by Twice

- Digital and standard edition cover

Single by Twice

from the album Dive
- Language: Japanese
- B-side: "Catch a Wave"
- Released: May 31, 2023
- Genre: J-pop; pop
- Length: 3:24
- Label: Warner Japan
- Composers: Henri Vuortenvirta; JJean; Justin Reinstein
- Lyricists: Seo Yong-won (153/Joombas); Yuki Kokubo

Twice singles chronology
"Set Me Free" (2023)	"Hare Hare" (2023)	"I Got You" (2024)

Twice Japanese singles chronology
"Celebrate" (2022)	"Hare Hare" (2023)	"Dive" (2024)

Music video
- "Hare Hare" on YouTube

"Hare Hare" (from Japanese 晴れ, meaning 'clear weather') is a song by South Korean girl group Twice. It is the group's tenth Japanese maxi single and the first single from their fifth Japanese studio album, Dive. "Hare Hare" was released for streaming and digital download on May 12, 2023, while the CD single was released on May 31, 2023, through Warner Music Japan. The song was written for the group's first stadium performance in Japan as part of their Ready to Be World Tour.

"Hare Hare" was a commercial success, debuting at number two on the Oricon Singles Chart and at number three on the Billboard Japan Hot 100. It also went on to sell over 135,000 physical copies in its first week. It was certified gold in both streaming and physical sales by the Recording Industry Association of Japan.

== Composition ==
The maxi single contains four tracks, including "Hare Hare" and its B-side "Catch a Wave", with instrumental versions of both songs. "Hare Hare" is a pop song written in the key of A minor with a tempo of 128 beats per minute. Its message was described as a story about "turning a clouded heart into a clear one".

== Promotion ==
Twice performed "Hare Hare" for the first time at Yanmar Stadium Nagai in Osaka on May 13–14, 2023. This was followed by performances at Ajinomoto Stadium in Tokyo on May 20–21, as part of their Ready to Be World Tour. The group held live events in Tokyo and Osaka on October 7–8 with 2,000 winners from the "WithLive Meet & Greet" electronic ticket application lottery.

== Music video ==
In the "Hare Hare" music video, Twice performs the song in a stadium under a blue sky. In other scenes, weather-controlling fairies called "1004" (천사; cheonsa; lit. 'angel') appear and work with the members to change rainy weather into sunny weather.

== Track listing ==
"Hare Hare" track listing
No.	Title	Lyrics	Music	Arrangement	Length
1.	"Hare Hare"	Seo Yongwon (153/Joombas); Yu-ki Kokubo	Henri Vuortenvirta; JJean; Justin Reinstein	Henzo	3:24
2.	"Catch a Wave"	Mayu Wakisaka	Kuzzi; JJean; Justin Reinstein	Justin Reinstein	3:34
3.	"Hare Hare" (instrumental)				3:24
4.	"Catch a Wave" (instrumental)				3:34
Total length:					14:00

"Hare Hare" – limited edition A DVD
No.	Title	Length
1.	""Hare Hare" Jacket Shooting Making Movie"
2.	""Hare Hare" Jacket Member Making Video"
Total length:		40:55

== Charts ==
=== Weekly charts ===
Weekly chart performance for "Hare Hare"
Chart (2023)	Peak position
Japan (Japan Hot 100)	3
Japan (Oricon)	2
Japan Combined Singles (Oricon)	2

=== Monthly charts ===
Monthly chart performance for "Hare Hare"
Chart (2023)	Position
Japan (Oricon)	5

=== Year-end charts ===
Year-end chart performance for "Hare Hare"
Chart (2023)	Position
Japan (Oricon)	55
Japan Top Singles Sales (Billboard Japan)	55

== Certifications ==
Certifications for "Hare Hare"
Region	Certification	Certified units/sales
Japan (RIAJ)	Gold	100,000^{^}
Streaming
Japan (RIAJ)	Gold	50,000,000^{†}
^{^} Shipments figures based on certification alone.^{†} Streaming-only figures based on certification alone.

== Release history ==
Release dates and formats for "Hare Hare"
Region	Date	Format	Version	Label	Ref.
Various	May 12, 2023	Digital download; streaming	Pre-release	Warner Music Japan	
Various	May 31, 2023	Digital download; streaming; CD; CD+DVD	Limited A; Limited B; regular; Once Japan	Warner Music Japan	
