= Kura Kura (Twice song) =

- Digital and standard edition cover

Single by Twice

from the album Perfect World
- Language: Japanese
- B-side: "Strawberry Moon"
- Released: May 12, 2021
- Length: 3:48
- Label: Warner Music Japan
- Composer: Uta
- Lyricists: J. Y. Park; Yu-Ki Kokubo

Twice singles chronology
"Cry for Me" (2020)	"Kura Kura" (2021)	"Alcohol-Free" (2021)

Twice Japanese singles chronology
"Better" (2020)	"Kura Kura" (2021)	"Perfect World" (2021)

Music video
- "Kura Kura" on YouTube

"Kura Kura" (lit. 'dizzy') is a song recorded by South Korean girl group Twice. It is the group's eighth Japanese maxi single, featuring three other tracks. It was pre-released for digital download and streaming on April 21, 2021, by Warner Music Japan. The single and its B-side, "Strawberry Moon", were physically released on May 12, 2021, in Japan. The single's lyrics, co-written by Park Jin-young, "express the feelings of two people becoming mesmerized with one another".

== Background and release ==
Twice announced the song and its B-side, "Strawberry Moon", at the end of their online concert "Twice in Wonderland", which was held on March 6, 2021. Its music video was released on April 20, 2021, on YouTube.

== Promotion ==
Twice performed "Kura Kura" for the first time at a special showcase to commemorate the single's release, on May 12, 2021, which was broadcast live through YouTube. The group also performed the song on Music Station on May 14.

== Track listing ==
Digital download EP
No.	Title	Lyrics	Music	Length
1.	"Kura Kura"	J. Y. Park; Yu-Ki Kokubo	Uta	3:48
2.	"Strawberry Moon"	Yuka Matsumoto	Ciara; Trippy	3:23
3.	"Kura Kura" (Instrumental)	Park; Kokubo	Uta	3:48
4.	"Strawberry Moon" (Instrumental)	Matsumoto	Ciara; Trippy; Uta	3:21
Total length:				14:20

First press limited edition A DVD
No.	Title	Length
1.	"Kura Kura" (Music Video Making Movie)
2.	"Kura Kura" (Jacket Shooting Making Movie)

== Credits and personnel ==
Credits adapted from CD single liner notes.

- Twice – lead vocals, background vocals
- J. Y. Park "The Asiansoul" – lyricist (on "Kura Kura")
- Yu-ki Kokubo – lyricist (on "Kura Kura")
- Uta – composer, arranger, all instruments (on "Kura Kura")
- Sayulee – background vocals
- Red Anne – vocal director (on "Kura Kura")
- Eom Sehee – recording engineer (on "Kura Kura")
- Tony Maserati – mixer (on "Kura Kura")
- Chris Gehringer – mastering engineer (on "Kura Kura")
- Yuka Matsumoto – lyricist (on "Strawberry Moon")
- Trippy – composer, arranger, vocal director, keyboard, electric piano, bass, synthesizer, drum programming (on "Strawberry Moon")
- Ciara – composer (on "Strawberry Moon")
- Perrie – vocal director (on "Strawberry Moon")
- Lee Sangyeop – recording engineer (on "Strawberry Moon")
- Yoon Wonkwon – mixer (on "Strawberry Moon")
- Kwon Namwoo – mastering engineer (on "Strawberry Moon")

== Charts ==
=== Weekly charts ===
Weekly chart performance for "Kura Kura"
Chart (2021)	Peak position
Global Excl. US (Billboard)	163
Japan Hot 100 (Billboard)	3
Japan (Oricon)	3
Japan Digital Singles (Oricon)	3

=== Year-end charts ===
Year-end chart performance for "Kura Kura"
Chart (2021)	Position
Japan (Oricon)	59

== Certifications ==
Certifications for "Kura Kura"
Region	Certification	Certified units/sales
Japan (RIAJ)	Gold	100,000^{^}
Streaming
Japan (RIAJ)	Gold	50,000,000^{†}
^{^} Shipments figures based on certification alone.^{†} Streaming-only figures based on certification alone.

== Release history ==
Release dates and formats for "Kura Kura"
Country	Date	Format(s)	Edition	Label	Ref.
Various	April 21, 2021	Digital download; streaming	Standard Edition	Warner Music Japan	
Japan	May 12, 2021	CD single	Standard Edition	Warner Music Japan	
Japan	May 12, 2021	CD + DVD	Limited Edition A	Warner Music Japan	
Japan	May 12, 2021	CD	Limited Edition B	Warner Music Japan	
Japan	May 12, 2021	CD	Fan Club Limited Edition	Warner Music Japan	
