= Better (Twice song) =

2020 song by Twice

- Digital and standard edition cover

Single by Twice

from the album Perfect World
- Language: Japanese
- B-side: "Scorpion"
- Released: November 18, 2020
- Length: 3:44
- Label: Warner Music Japan
- Composers: Eunsol; Lauren Kaori
- Lyricists: Lauren Kaori; Mio Jorakuji

Twice singles chronology
"I Can't Stop Me" (2020)	"Better" (2020)	"Cry for Me" (2020)

Twice Japanese singles chronology
"Fanfare" (2020)	"Better" (2020)	"Kura Kura" (2021)

Music video
- "Better" on YouTube

"Better" is a song recorded by South Korean girl group Twice. It is the group's seventh Japanese maxi single, featuring three other tracks. It was pre-released for digital download and streaming on November 11, 2020, by Warner Music Japan as the second single from their third Japanese studio album, Perfect World. The single and its B-side, "Scorpion", were physically released on November 18 in Japan.

== Background and release ==
On September 23, 2020—a week after Twice released their third Japanese compilation album, #Twice3—the group announced the release of their seventh Japanese single titled "Better", along with several teaser images for the new track. It marked the group's first Japanese single since "Fanfare" (2020). The song was composed by Eunsol and Lauren Kaori, with lyrics written by the latter and Mio Jorakuji. According to JYP Entertainment, the song was "produced with the yearning of Twice members to be able to meet with fans around the world in person".

"Better" was released for digital download and streaming in various countries on November 11 by Warner Music Japan. The single includes the B-side track "Scorpion", and instrumentals of both "Better" and "Scorpion". The accompanying music video was released simultaneously with the single's release. The song was made available as a CD single in Japan on November 18 in four versions: Standard Edition, First Press Limited Edition A, First Press Limited Edition B, and Fan Club Edition (Once Japan Limited Edition). The Standard Edition contains the CD with a trading card. First Press Limited Edition A contains the CD single, a lyric-book of the members, a trading card, and a DVD containing the making of the music video of "Better" and the making of album jacket photos. First Press Limited Edition B contains the CD, a trading card, a jacket design, and an original photo sticker sheet. The Once Japan version contains the CD, two trading cards, and a 3x3 folded poster.

== Promotion ==
Twice performed "Better" for the first time on TV Asahi's Music Station on November 13, 2020. On November 18, the group performed the song at a special showcase to commemorate the single's release, which was broadcast live through YouTube. A dance practice video was also released the same day, featuring the group practicing their choreography.

== Commercial performance ==
The CD single debuted at number two on the daily ranking of the Oricon Singles Chart with 54,152 units sold on its release day. It also ranked number two on the weekly Oricon Singles Chart with 83,764 copies sold. It also debuted at number three on the Billboard Japan Hot 100 chart, recording 93,548 unit sales on November 16–22, 2020.

== Track listing ==
Digital download EP
No.	Title	Lyrics	Music	Length
1.	"Better"	Lauren Kaori; Mio Jorakuji	Eunsol; Lauren Kaori	3:44
2.	"Scorpion"	Kiee	Woo Min Lee "collapsedone"; Krysta Youngs; Julia Ross	3:29
3.	"Better" (Instrumental)		Eunsol; Lauren Kaori	3:44
4.	"Scorpion" (Instrumental)		Woo Min Lee "collapsedone"; Krysta Youngs; Julia Ross	3:29
Total length:				14:22

First press limited edition A DVD
No.	Title	Length
1.	"Better" (Music video making movie)
2.	"Better" (Jacket Shooting making movie)

== Credits and personnel ==
Credits adapted from CD single liner notes.

- Twice – lead vocals, background vocals
- Lauren Kaori – lyricist, composer (on "Better")
- Mio Jorakuji – lyricist (on "Better")
- Eunsol – composer, arranger, all instruments (on "Better")
- Kate – background vocals
- Armadillo – vocal director (on "Better")
- Park Eunjung – recording engineer
- Tony Maserati – mixer (on "Better")
- Chris Gehringer – mastering engineer (on "Better")
- Kiee – lyricist (on "Scorpion")
- Woo Min Lee "collapsedone" – composer, arranger, all instruments (on "Scorpion")
- Krysta Youngs – composer (on "Scorpion")
- Julia Ross – composer (on "Scorpion")
- Emily Yeonseo Kim – vocal director (on "Scorpion")
- Shin Bongwon – mixer (on "Scorpion")
- Park Jung Un – mastering engineer (on "Scorpion")

== Charts ==
Chart performances for "Better"
Chart (2020)	Peak position
Japan (Japan Hot 100)	3
Japan (Oricon)	2

== Certifications ==
Certifications for "Better"
Region	Certification	Certified units/sales
Japan (RIAJ)	Gold	100,000^{^}
Streaming
Japan (RIAJ)	Gold	50,000,000^{†}
^{^} Shipments figures based on certification alone.^{†} Streaming-only figures based on certification alone.

== Release history ==
Release dates and formats for "Better"
Country	Date	Format(s)	Edition	Label	Ref.
Various	November 11, 2020	Digital download; streaming	Standard Edition	Warner Music Japan	
Japan	November 18, 2020	CD single	Standard Edition	Warner Music Japan	
Japan	November 18, 2020	CD + DVD	Limited Edition A	Warner Music Japan	
Japan	November 18, 2020	CD	Limited Edition B	Warner Music Japan	
Japan	November 18, 2020	CD	Fan Club Limited Edition	Warner Music Japan	
