= Dive (Twice album) =

2024 studio album by Twice

- Digital and limited B edition cover

Studio album by Twice
- Released: July 17, 2024
- Length: 32:20
- Languages: Japanese; English
- Label: Warner Music Japan

Twice chronology
With You-th (2024)	Dive (2024)	Strategy (2024)

Singles from Dive
- 1. "Hare Hare" Released: May 12, 2023; 2. "Dive" Released: July 10, 2024

Dive is the fifth Japanese studio album (eighth overall) by South Korean girl group Twice. It was released on July 17, 2024, by Warner Music Japan. The album features ten tracks, including the title track "Dive" and the previously released single "Hare Hare". It also includes "Dance Again", which was previously released as a digital single on December 12, 2023, and was featured in the "FamilyMart x Twice Christmas Chicken" advertising campaign.

== Release and promotion ==
On December 28, 2023, Twice announced that they would release their fifth Japanese studio album during the summer of 2024. On April 30, 2024, it was announced that the album, titled Dive, would be released on July 17, marking the seventh anniversary of Twice's official debut in Japan. The title track "Dive" was pre-released as a digital single on July 10, along with its music video. To promote the album, Twice performed "Dive" and "Here I Am" on TV Asahi's Music Station, on July 19. The group also performed songs from the album during the final leg of the Ready to Be World Tour in Japan.

== Commercial performance ==
Dive debuted at number 2 on the weekly ranking of the Oricon Albums Chart with 104,051 copies sold. It also debuted at number 2 on the Billboard Japan Hot Albums chart, recording 1,329 downloads and 130,009 copies sold from July 15–21, 2024.

== Track listing ==
Track listing for Dive
No.	Title	Lyrics	Music	Arrangement	Length
1.	"Beyond the Horizon"	Yu-ki Kokubo; YHEL	Nils Rulewski Stenberg; Malin Christin	Nils Rulewski Stenberg (Hitfire Production)	3:32
2.	"Dive"	Yoon (153/Joombas); Kelbyul (153/Joombas); Ha Dawon (153/Joombas); Yu-ki Kokubo	Andy Love; Carmen Reece; SB; CR; Sehee Cho		3:01
3.	"Ocean Deep"	Dayoung Jeong (153/Joombas); Yu-ki Kokubo	Alawn; Anne Judith Wik; Nermin Harambašić	Alawn	3:40
4.	"Love Warning"	Masami Kakinuma (Relic Lyric); YHEL	JJean; Justin Reinstein	Justin Reinstein	3:26
5.	"Here I Am"	Masami Kakinuma (Relic Lyric)	Anne Judith Wik; Ronny Svendsen; Pizzapunk	Ronny Svendsen; Pizzapunk	2:50
6.	"Inside of Me"	Co-sho	T-SK; ViiV; Jonna Hall	T-SK	2:53
7.	"Peach Soda"	Rose Blueming	Won Again; Anna Kusakawa	Won Again (The Architects)	3:10
8.	"Echoes of Heart"	Gratia	HotSauce; Mayu Wakisaka; JJean	HotSauce	3:14
9.	"Dance Again"	Co-sho	Alexander Karlsson; Alexej Viktorovitch; Ellen Berg	JeL	3:11
10.	"Hare Hare"	Seo Yongwon (153/Joombas); Yu-ki Kokubo	Henri Vuortenvirta; JJean (Number K); Justin Reinstein	Henzo	3:23
Total length:					32:20

First press limited edition A DVD
No.	Title	Length
1.	"Hare Hare" (Music Video)
2.	"Hare Hare" (Music Video Making Movie)
3.	"Dive" (Jacket Shooting Making Movie)
4.	"Dive" (Jacket Member Making Video)

== Personnel ==
Credits are adapted from the album's liner notes.

- Twice – vocals, background vocals
- Nils Rulewski Stenberg – all instruments, programming (1)
- Elley – background vocals
- Sophia Pae – vocal director (1–2, 5–7)
- SB – song director, piano, drums, bass (1)
- CR – song director, synth (1)
- Sehee Cho – song director, guitar (1)
- Minhun Kang – strings (1)
- Alawn – all instruments, programming (3)
- Adora – vocal director (3–4)
- Justin Reinstein – all instruments, programming (4)
- Ronny Svendsen – all instruments, programming (5)
- Pizzapunk – all instruments, programming (5)
- Hide Kawada – song director (6)
- T-SK – programming (6)
- Won Again – all instruments, programming (7)
- HotSauce – all instruments, programming, vocal director (8)
- Alexej Viktorovitch – all instruments (9)
- Yu-ki Kokubo – vocal director (9–10)

== Charts ==
=== Weekly charts ===
Weekly chart performance for Dive
Chart (2024)	Peak position
Japanese Albums (Oricon)	2
Japanese Combined Albums (Oricon)	2
Japanese Hot Albums (Billboard Japan)	2
UK Album Downloads (Official Charts)	87

=== Monthly charts ===
Monthly chart performance for Dive
Chart (2024)	Position
Japanese Albums (Oricon)	5

=== Year-end charts ===
Year-end chart performance for Dive
Chart (2024)	Position
Japanese Albums (Oricon)	28
Japanese Hot Albums (Billboard Japan)	32

== Certifications ==
Certifications for Dive
Region	Certification	Certified units/sales
Japan (RIAJ)	Gold	100,000^{^}
^{^} Shipments figures based on certification alone.
