= Perfect World (Twice song) =

2021 song by Twice

Single by Twice

from the album Perfect World
- Language: Japanese
- Released: June 29, 2021
- Genre: J-pop; dance
- Length: 3:03
- Label: Warner Music Japan
- Composers: Woo Min Lee "collapsedone"; Justin Reinstein; JJean; LACND
- Lyricist: Risa Horie

Twice singles chronology
"Alcohol-Free" (2021)	"Perfect World" (2021)	"The Feels" (2021)

Twice Japanese singles chronology
"Kura Kura" (2021)	"Perfect World" (2021)	"Doughnut" (2021)

Music video
- "Perfect World" on YouTube

"Perfect World" is a song recorded by South Korean girl group Twice. It was released by Warner Music Japan on June 29, 2021, as a digital single from their third Japanese studio album of the same name (2021).

== Background and release ==
In June 2021, two teasers for "Perfect World" were posted before its release. The song was officially released on June 29, 2021.

== Composition ==
"Perfect World" was composed by Woo Min Lee "collapsedone", Justin Reinstein, JJean and LACND, with lyrics written by Risa Horie. Running for 3 minutes and 3 seconds, the song is composed in the key of D-sharp minor with a tempo of 135 beats per minute. "Perfect World" was described as a fast-paced song that depicts a "strong woman" who is unfazed by any situation.

== Music video ==
The song's music video, directed by Yoojeong Ko, was released on YouTube on June 29, 2021. In the video, Twice perform the song on a luxurious stage in a theatre. The people in the audience become increasingly disoriented as they are drawn in by the members' charms. By the end of the performance, the stage is crashing and burning around them. The dance choreography was created by Rian, Gabee, and Simeez of Lachica.

== Commercial performance ==
The week of July 7, 2021, "Perfect World" debuted and peaked at number twenty-four on the Billboard Japan Hot 100. In March 2023, it was certified gold by the Recording Industry Association of Japan.

== Personnel ==
Credits adapted from Melon.

- Twice – lead vocals
- Risa Horie – lyricist
- Woo Min Lee "collapsedone" – arrangement, composition
- Justin Reinstein – composition
- Jjean – composition
- LACND – arrangement, composition

== Charts ==
Weekly chart performance for "Perfect World"
Chart (2021)	Peak position
Global Excl. US (Billboard)	192
Japan (Japan Hot 100)	24
Japan Digital Singles (Oricon)	21

== Certifications ==
Streaming certifications for "Perfect World"
Region	Certification	Certified units/sales
Japan (RIAJ)	Gold	50,000,000^{†}
^{†} Streaming-only figures based on certification alone.

== Release history ==
Release dates and formats for "Perfect World"
Country	Date	Format(s)	Label	Ref.
Various	July 29, 2021	Digital download; streaming	Warner Music Japan	
