= Fanfare (song) =

2020 single by Twice

- Digital and standard edition cover

Single by Twice

from the album Perfect World
- Language: Japanese
- B-side: "More & More (Japanese ver.)"
- Released: July 8, 2020
- Length: 3:40
- Label: Warner Music Japan
- Composers: Louise Frick Sveen; Atsushi Shimada; Kenichi Sakamuro
- Lyricist: Chiemi

Twice singles chronology
"More & More" (2020)	"Fanfare" (2020)	"I Can't Stop Me" (2020)

Twice Japanese singles chronology
"Fake & True" (2019)	"Fanfare" (2020)	"Better" (2020)

Music video
- "Fanfare" on YouTube

"Fanfare" is a song recorded by South Korean girl group Twice. It is the group's sixth Japanese maxi single, featuring three other tracks. It was pre-released for digital download and streaming on June 19, 2020, by Warner Music Japan as the first single from their third Japanese studio album, Perfect World. The single and its B-side, "More & More" (Japanese version), were physically released on July 8 in Japan.

== Release and promotion ==
On May 5, 2020, Twice announced the release of their sixth Japanese single titled "Fanfare", describing it as "an upbeat song that hopes to add a bright energy to everyone around the world". "Fanfare" was pre-released as a digital single on various online music portals on June 19, and the music video was released online the same day. On July 4, Twice performed "Fanfare" for the first time on NHK's music program Shibuya Note. The CD single was released on July 8 in four different versions: Standard Edition, Limited Edition A, Limited Edition B, and Once Japan Limited Edition.

== Commercial performance ==
The CD single debuted at number 2 on the daily ranking of the Oricon Singles Chart with 108,796 units sold on July 7, 2020. It topped the weekly Oricon Singles Chart with 176,725 copies sold. It also debuted atop the Billboard Japan Hot 100 with 208,778 copies sold, 5,529 downloads, and 2,198,665 streams recorded July 6–12.

== Track listing ==
CD, digital download, streaming
No.	Title	Lyrics	Music	Arrangement	Length
1.	"Fanfare"	Chiemi	Louise Frick Sveen; Atsushi Shimada; Kenichi Sakamuro	Atsushi Shimada; Kenichi Sakamuro	3:40
2.	"More & More" (Japanese version)	Natsumi Watanabe	Uzoechi Emenike; Justin Tranter; Julia Michaels; Zara Larsson	MNEK; J.Y. Park "The Asiansoul"; Lee Hae-sol	3:20
3.	"Fanfare (Lee Hae-sol remix)"			Lee Hae-sol	3:50
4.	"Fanfare" (instrumental)				3:40

DVD - A
No.	Title	Length
1.	"Fanfare" (music video)
2.	"Fanfare" (music video making movie)

DVD - B
No.	Title	Length
1.	"Jacket Shooting Making Movie"

== Charts ==
=== Weekly charts ===
Chart performance for "Fanfare"
Chart (2020)	Peak position
Japan (Japan Hot 100)	1
Japan (Oricon)	1

=== Year-end charts ===
2020 year-end chart performance for "Fanfare"
Chart (2020)	Position
Japan (Japan Hot 100)	41

== Certifications ==
Certifications for "Fanfare"
Region	Certification	Certified units/sales
Japan (RIAJ)	Platinum	250,000^{^}
Streaming
Japan (RIAJ)	Platinum	100,000,000^{†}
^{^} Shipments figures based on certification alone.^{†} Streaming-only figures based on certification alone.

== See also ==
- List of Hot 100 number-one singles of 2020 (Japan)
- List of Oricon number-one singles of 2020
