= Alcohol-Free =

2021 song by Twice

Single by Twice

from the EP Taste of Love
- Language: Korean
- Released: June 9, 2021
- Studio: JYP Studios; Studio T
- Genre: Bossa nova
- Length: 3:30
- Label: JYP; Republic
- Songwriters: J. Y. Park "The Asiansoul"; Lee Hae-sol
- Producers: Lee Hae-sol; J. Y. Park "The Asiansoul"

Twice singles chronology
| "Kura Kura" (2021) | "Alcohol-Free" (2021) | "Perfect World" (2021) |

Music video
- "Alcohol-Free" on YouTube

"Alcohol-Free" is a song recorded by South Korean girl group Twice. It was released on June 9, 2021, through JYP Entertainment and Republic Records. It serves as the lead single from the group's tenth extended play, Taste of Love, which was released two days after.

== Background and release ==
On April 19, 2021, it was reported that Twice were in the final stages of preparing for their comeback slated for June and were planning to film a music video on Jeju Island. The group revealed the track listing to the EP, revealing "Alcohol-Free" as the lead single. On June 7 and 8, the music video teasers for its accompanying video were published. "Alcohol-Free" was released for digital download and streaming on June 9, alongside an accompanying music video. To promote "Alcohol-Free", Twice performed the song on The Ellen DeGeneres Show on the day of its release.

== Composition ==
Written by J. Y. Park, "Alcohol-Free" is a bossa nova summer track with some hip hop elements, expressing Twice's "unique colors". Chaeyoung and Jihyo said that it reminded them of the group's earlier summer song, "Dance the Night Away". Lyrically, the song recounts the magical moments of falling in love, with references to alcoholic drinks and cocktails. Running for 3 minutes and 30 seconds, the song is composed in the key of G♯ major with a tempo of 97 beats per minute.

== Reception ==
Billboard ranked "Alcohol-Free" the 89th best song of 2021, writing that "Music history is littered with classic booze bangers, but far rarer is the pop jewel that sings of sobriety while remaining absolutely intoxicating." The song was ranked at number 83 on Pitchfork's readers polls for the 100 best songs of the year. It also appeared in unranked lists of the best K-pop songs of 2021 by CNN Philippines, Marie Claire, The National, and Teen Vogue.

Commercially, "Alcohol-Free" peaked at number 41 on the Billboard Global 200 and spent 8 weeks on the chart. In Japan, the song peaked at number 19 on the Billboard Japan Hot 100. In South Korea, it peaked at number 6 on the Gaon Digital Chart and at number 7 on the K-pop Hot 100.

== Music video ==
The music video for "Alcohol-Free" was released on June 9, 2021. Directed by Rima Yoon and Dongju Jang of Rigend Film, it was filmed on location in Jeju Island. In the music video, the Twice members throw a beach party at a tropical resort, dressed in colorful outfits. Eleven days after release, the music video surpassed 100 million views, Twice's fastest music video to reach that milestone.

== Versions in other languages ==
Twice released the fourth compilation album #Twice4, on March 16, 2022, which includes both Korean and Japanese-language versions of "Alcohol-Free". The Japanese lyrics were written by Yuki Kokobo. An English version of the song was released as part of Twice's The Remixes album on November 22, 2023. The English lyrics were co-written by Melanie Fontana and Lindgren.

== Accolades ==
Nominations for "Alcohol-Free"
| Year | Organization | Award | Result | Ref. |
|---|---|---|---|---|
| 2021 | Gaon Chart Music Awards | Artist of the Year – Digital Music (June) | Nominated | |
| 2021 | Mnet Asian Music Awards | Best Dance Performance – Female Group | Nominated | |
| 2021 | Mnet Asian Music Awards | Song of the Year | Nominated | |
| 2021 | MTV Video Music Awards | Best K-Pop | Nominated | |
| 2022 | Golden Disc Awards | Digital Bonsang | Nominated | |
| 2022 | Joox Thailand Music Awards | Korean Song of the Year | Nominated | |

Music program awards for "Alcohol-Free"
| Program | Date | Ref. |
|---|---|---|
| Inkigayo | June 20, 2021 | |
| Inkigayo | June 27, 2021 | |
| M Countdown | June 17, 2021 | |
| M Countdown | June 24, 2021 | |

== Credits and personnel ==
Credits adopted from Melon.

Studios

- JYPE Studios – recording, digital editing, mixing
- Studio T – strings recording
- 821 Sound – mastering

personnel

- Twice – vocals
- Sophia Pae – background vocals
- Distract – background vocals
- Shim Eun-ji – vocal director, digital editing
- JY Park “The Asiansoul” – lyricist, composition, arrangement, vocal director, all instruments, digital editing
- Lee Hae-sol – arrangement, all instruments, sessions computer programming
- Chun-ho Ham – guitar
- ON the string – string
- Lee Na-il – string arranged & conducted
- Lee Sang-yeop– digital editing, mixing
- Tae-seop Lee – mixing
- Eom Se-hee – recording engineer
- Park Eun-jung – recording engineer
- Oh Seong-geun – strings recording
- Joo Ye-chan – recording asstinst
- Kwon Nam-woo – mastering

== Charts ==
=== Weekly charts ===
Weekly chart performance
| Chart (2021) | Peak position |
|---|---|
| Global 200 (Billboard) | 41 |
| Japan Hot 100 (Billboard) | 19 |
| Japan Combined Singles (Oricon) | 19 |
| Malaysia (RIM) | 11 |
| Netherlands (Dutch Global Top 40) | 25 |
| New Zealand Hot Singles (RMNZ) | 28 |
| Singapore (RIAS) | 7 |
| South Korea (Gaon) | 6 |
| South Korea (K-pop Hot 100) | 7 |
| US World Digital Song Sales (Billboard) | 3 |

=== Monthly charts ===
Monthly chart performance
| Chart (2021) | Peak position |
|---|---|
| South Korea (Gaon) | 12 |
| South Korea (K-pop 100) | 9 |

=== Year-end charts ===
Year-end chart performance
| Chart (2021) | Position |
|---|---|
| South Korea (Gaon) | 68 |

== Certifications ==
Streaming certifications for "Alcohol-Free"
| Region | Certification | Certified units/sales |
|---|---|---|
| Japan (RIAJ) | Gold | 50,000,000^{†} |
^{†} Streaming-only figures based on certification alone.

== See also ==
- List of Inkigayo Chart winners (2021)
- List of M Countdown Chart winners (2021)
