= Set Me Free (Twice song) =

2023 song by Twice

- Remixes artwork

Single by Twice

from the EP Ready to Be
- Language: Korean
- Released: March 10, 2023
- Recorded: 2022
- Studio: JYP Studios
- Genre: Disco
- Length: 3:02
- Label: JYP; Republic
- Composers: Melanie Fontana; Lindgren; Marty Maro
- Lyricists: Star Wars (Galactika); Jvde (Galactika)
- Producer: Lindgren

Twice singles chronology
| "Moonlight Sunrise" (2023) | "Set Me Free" (2023) | "Hare Hare" (2023) |

Music video
- "Set Me Free" on YouTube

"Set Me Free" is a song recorded by South Korean girl group Twice. It was released as the lead single of their twelfth extended play Ready to Be on March 10, 2023. It is a disco song characterized by a groovy, synth, bass line, with lyrics revolving around the protagonists finding their own courage to confess their love to a crush. It was written by Melanie Fontana, Marty Maro, Star Wars, Jvde and Lindgren who also handled the production.

"Set Me Free" peaked at number 28 on the Billboard Global 200 and number 94 on South Korea's Circle Digital Chart. It also entered charts in Canada, Hong Kong, Japan, Malaysia, Philippines, and Vietnam, and the top ten in Singapore and Taiwan. In the United States, the song debuted at number seven on the Bubbling Under Hot 100 chart.

== Background ==
On February 3, 2023, the group officially announced the single release for March 10. Individuals concept photos, as well as the group's concept photos for the song, were released on their official YouTube account. In an interview with KBS News, Jeongyeon revealed that they had been working on the song since the previous year. Nayeon noted that the new song shows a different side of Twice, saying "Since this is our first comeback in 7 months and our first comeback in 2023, we prepared hard to show our fans a new side of us…I am excited because I think I will be able to show a different concept and performance from my previous work."

== Composition ==
"Set Me Free" is a disco track that takes a retro-futuristic approach, characterized by groovy, synth, bass line, "simple yet powerful sound", and liberating lyrics. The lyrics revolve around the protagonists finding the courage to confess their love to a crush, with lines such as "I've been hiding how I feel for you forever" and "Now that it's off my chest there's room for you and me". Member Jihyo explained that "Set Me Free" holds the meaning of "Let's break away from everything that binds us and love freely, to our heart's content."

== Music video ==
A scene in the music video where Twice is dancing in a planet in outer space

The music video alternates between two sets, a lonely planet in outer space where they perform the song's choreography and a soundstage designed to look like a small town. After the rap, a false ending is implemented, where the Twice's end screen (consisting of the logos of the group and their entertainment company JYP) is revealed to be shown on a cinema screen that the members watch.

Mina explained the meaning behind the music video, saying "it captures the image of Twice becoming more free". She also explained that each member expressed a different kind of freedom.

== Promotion ==
On February 20, a snippet of "Set Me Free" was revealed on TikTok before the song's official release. On March 4 and 5, Twice opened "Twice Pop-up Experience" in Los Angeles to communicate and celebrate the release of "Set Me Free" with their fans, where they teased part of the song's choreography. Twice performed the song for the first time on The Tonight Show Starring Jimmy Fallon on the same day of its release. The group also performed the song on the South Korean music programs M Countdown, Music Bank, Show! Music Core, and Inkigayo.

== Accolades ==
Award and nominations for "Set Me Free"
| Year | Organization | Award | Result | Ref. |
|---|---|---|---|---|
| 2023 | Asian Pop Music Awards | Song of the Year (Overseas) | Nominated | |
| 2023 | Asian Pop Music Awards | Best Producer (Overseas) (Note: Producer: Lindgren) | Nominated | |
| 2023 | The Fact Music Awards | Best Music – Spring | Nominated | |

Music program awards
| Program | Date | Ref. |
|---|---|---|
| Music Bank | March 17, 2023 | |
| Show Champion | March 22, 2023 | |

== Track listing ==
- Remixes
1. "Set Me Free" (English version) – 3:01
2. "Set Me Free" – 3:01
3. "Set Me Free" (Lindgren remix) [English version] – 3:31
4. "Set Me Free" (Lindgren remix) – 3:31
5. "Set Me Free" (Tommy "TBHits" Brown remix) [English version] – 2:50
6. "Set Me Free" (Tommy "TBHits" Brown remix) – 2:50
7. "Set Me Free" (ARMNHMR remix) [English version] – 2:58

== Credits and personnel ==
Credits adopted from Melon.

- Twice – vocals
- Stars Wars (Galactika) – lyricist
- Jvde (Galactika) – lyricist, vocals director
- Melanie Fontana – composer, background vocals
- Marty Maro – composer
- Lindgren – composer, arranger, producer
- Friday (Galactika) – vocals director
- Nicole Neely – strings
- Lee Kyung-won – digital editing
- Gu Hye-jin – recording
- Im Chan-mi – recording
- Curtis Douglas – mixing
- Kwon Nam-woo – mastering
- Haneul Lee – immersive mix engineer
- Jung-hoon Choi – immersive mix engineer

== Charts ==
=== Weekly charts ===
Weekly chart performance
| Chart (2023) | Peak position |
|---|---|
| Canada Hot 100 (Billboard) | 75 |
| Global 200 (Billboard) | 28 |
| Hong Kong (Billboard) | 19 |
| Japan (Japan Hot 100) | 16 |
| Japan Combined Singles (Oricon) | 25 |
| Malaysia (Billboard) | 19 |
| New Zealand Hot Singles (RMNZ) | 13 |
| Philippines (Billboard) | 12 |
| Singapore (RIAS) | 8 |
| South Korea (Circle) | 94 |
| Taiwan (Billboard) | 2 |
| UK Singles Downloads (Official Charts) | 95 |
| UK Singles Sales (OCC) | 100 |
| US Bubbling Under Hot 100 (Billboard) | 7 |
| US Digital Song Sales (Billboard) | 22 |
| US World Digital Song Sales (Billboard) | 2 |
| Vietnam (Vietnam Hot 100) | 47 |

=== Monthly charts ===
Monthly chart performance
| Chart (2023) | Position |
|---|---|
| South Korea (Circle) | 117 |

== Certifications ==
Streaming certifications for "Set Me Free"
| Region | Certification | Certified units/sales |
|---|---|---|
| Japan (RIAJ) | Gold | 50,000,000^{†} |
^{†} Streaming-only figures based on certification alone.

== Release history ==
Release dates and formats
| Region | Date | Format(s) | Version | Label | Ref. |
|---|---|---|---|---|---|
| Various | March 10, 2023 | Digital download; streaming | Original | JYP; Republic | |
| United States | March 14, 2023 | Digital download | Lindgren remix (Korean and English) | JYP; Republic | |
| United States | March 15, 2023 | Digital download | Tommy "TBHits" Brown remix (Korean and English) | JYP; Republic | |
| United States | March 16, 2023 | Digital download | ARMNHMR remix (English) | JYP; Republic | |
| Various | March 17, 2023 | Digital download; streaming | Remixes | JYP; Republic | |

== See also ==
- List of Music Bank Chart winners (2023)
- List of Show Champion Chart winners (2023)
