= The Remixes (Twice album) =

2023 remix album by Twice

Remix album by Twice
- Released: November 22, 2023
- Genre: Pop
- Length: 21:19
- Language: English
- Label: JYP

Twice chronology
Ready to Be (2023)	The Remixes (2023)	With You-th (2024)

The Remixes is the first remix album by South Korean girl group Twice, released on November 22, 2023, through JYP Entertainment. An English-language album, it includes seven tracks, including four remixes of the group's songs by various producers, the English versions of "Alcohol-Free" and "Cry for Me", and a version of "I Can't Stop Me" with the American pop-punk band Boys Like Girls.

== Promotion ==
Jonas Blue's dance-pop remix of "Moonlight Sunrise" was issued as a pre-release song in the week before the album's release.

== Track listing ==
The Remixes track listing
No.	Title	Lyrics	Music	Arrangement	Length
1.	"Moonlight Sunrise" (Jonas Blue remix)	Earattack; Nina Ann Nelson; Kaedi Dalley; Lee Woo-hyun	Earattack; Nelson; Dalley; Lee Woo-hyun	Earattack; Lee Woo-hyun; Jonas Blue	2:47
2.	"The Feels" (Ian Asher remix)	Lee Woo-min "collapsedone"; Justin Reinstein; Anna Timgren; Boy Matthews	collapsedone; Reinstein; Timgren	collapsedone; Reinstein; Ian Asher	2:51
3.	"Set Me Free" (Carneyval remix)	Star Wars (Galactika); Jvde (Galactika); Melanie Fontana; Lindgren	Fontana; Lindgren; Marty Maro	Lindgren; Carneyval	2:57
4.	"Alcohol-Free" (English version)	J. Y. Park "The Asiansoul"; Fontana; Lindgren	Park	Park; Lee Hae-sol	3:30
5.	"Cry for Me" (English version)	Heize; Park; Sophia Pae	Ryan Tedder; Fontana; Lindgren; A Wright	Lindgren	3:24
6.	"I Can't Stop Me" (with Boys Like Girls)	Park; Sim Eunjee; Pae	Fontana; Lindgren; A Wright	Lindgren	3:26
7.	"More & More" (Lee Hae Sol sped-up remix)	Park; Bibi	Uzoechi Emenike; Justin Tranter; Julia Michaels; Zara Larsson	MNEK; Park; Lee Hae-sol	2:25
Total length:					21:19

== Charts ==
Chart performance for The Remixes
Chart (2023)	Peak position
Japanese Digital Albums (Oricon)	19
Japanese Hot Albums (Billboard Japan)	73
