= Ready to Be =

2023 extended play by Twice

- Digital cover

EP by Twice
- Released: March 10, 2023
- Studio: JYPE Studios (Seoul)
- Genre: Pop
- Length: 20:24
- Languages: Korean; English
- Labels: JYP; Republic
- Producers: Lee Woo-hyun; Lee Woo-min "Collapsedone"; Lenno Linjama; Lindgren; Lostboy

Twice chronology
Between 1&2 (2022)	Ready to Be (2023)	The Remixes (2023)

Singles from Ready to Be
- 1. "Moonlight Sunrise" Released: January 20, 2023; 2. "Set Me Free" Released: March 10, 2023

Ready to Be is the twelfth extended play by South Korean girl group Twice. It was released on March 10, 2023, through JYP Entertainment and Republic Records. It consists of seven tracks, including the group's second English single "Moonlight Sunrise" and lead single "Set Me Free". The album sound draws mostly from pop and retro production, with its songs incorporating eclectic styles ranging from disco and pop-rock to Miami bass and balearic beats. Lyrically, the album discusses themes of maturity, confidence, love, and heartbreak.

The album was met with generally favorable reviews from critics, who praised the sophisticated retro, pop production and the EP's mature themes. Commercially, it debuted at number one on the Circle Album Chart with over one million physical copies in its first week. In the United States, the album debuted at number two on the Billboard 200 with 145,500 pure physical sales, making Twice the first female K-pop act to have three top-three albums and four top-ten albums in the country. The album sold 18,000 vinyl copies, achieving the highest first week vinyl sales in the United States for any all-female group since 1991. It also reached the top ten in Japan, Germany, Portugal, Poland, Hungary and Croatia.

== Background ==
After the group's contract was renewed with JYP Entertainment in July 2022, they released Between 1&2 in August of the same year, which served as a celebration of Twice's eighth year as a group. It received generally positive reviews from contemporary critics and was their first album to sell one million copies. In December 2022, it was announced on the group's SNS that they would release an English single and a mini album in January and March 2023. The announcement was accompanied by a poster with the date and the phrase "Twice Our Youth", which led internet users to assume that the phrase would be the title of their new album. In January 2023, Twice released "Moonlight Sunrise", their second English single after "The Feels". In the following month, they confirmed the title of the mini album, Ready to Be, and its lead single, "Set Me Free".

== Composition ==
Ready to Be is twenty minutes long and consists of seven songs. It is a primarily a pop record that heavily incorporates retro sounds. It features genres such as disco, pop-rock, blues, Miami bass, R&B, and dance-pop, with heavy influences from house, dream-pop, latin, and balearic beats. Lyrically, the album revolves around the themes of maturity, confidence, love, and heartbreak. Member Dahyun wrote the lyrics for "Blame It on Me" and "Crazy Stupid Love". A variety of songwriters and producers also participated, including Melanie Fontana, LDN Noise, Tayla Parx, Lindgren, Lostboy, Earattack, and Lee Woo-min "Collapsedone".

=== Songs ===
The opening track "Set Me Free" is a disco track characterized by a groovy bass line, a "common yet powerful sound", and liberating lyrics. The lyrics revolve around the protagonists finding the courage to confess their love to a crush, with lines such as "I've been hiding how I feel for you forever" and "Now that it's off my chest there's room for you and me". The second track is pre-release single "Moonlight Sunrise", an upbeat Miami bass, R&B, and pop song. The track incorporates a synth-pop arrangement with house influences, a dreamy melody, and lyrics that "explore the urgency of love." "Got the Thrills" is a Balearic beat-influenced dance-pop song. Some critics noted that "Got the Thrills" could be considered a sequel to "Talk That Talk" due to its similar synths and chord progression. "Got the Thrills" is followed by a rock and blues-inspired track, "Blame It on Me," whose lyrics were written by Twice member Dahyun. It is characterized by a "loud strum" of electric guitar, and a consistent chord progression throughout the track. Its lyrics talk about one-sided obsession with "a subtle touch of lust." Some critics described the song as an "ode to unrequited love and the consequences of not being reciprocated." The fifth song, "Wallflower," is a Latin-influenced track. Lyrically, it is about "confidently suggesting an intimate night and sharing a dance with one another." Dahyun also wrote the lyrics for the closing track, "Crazy Stupid Love." It is a pop-rock song describing a break-up and the "raging emotions of not wanting to deal with trivial lies and the toxicity that love can carry."

== Release and promotion ==
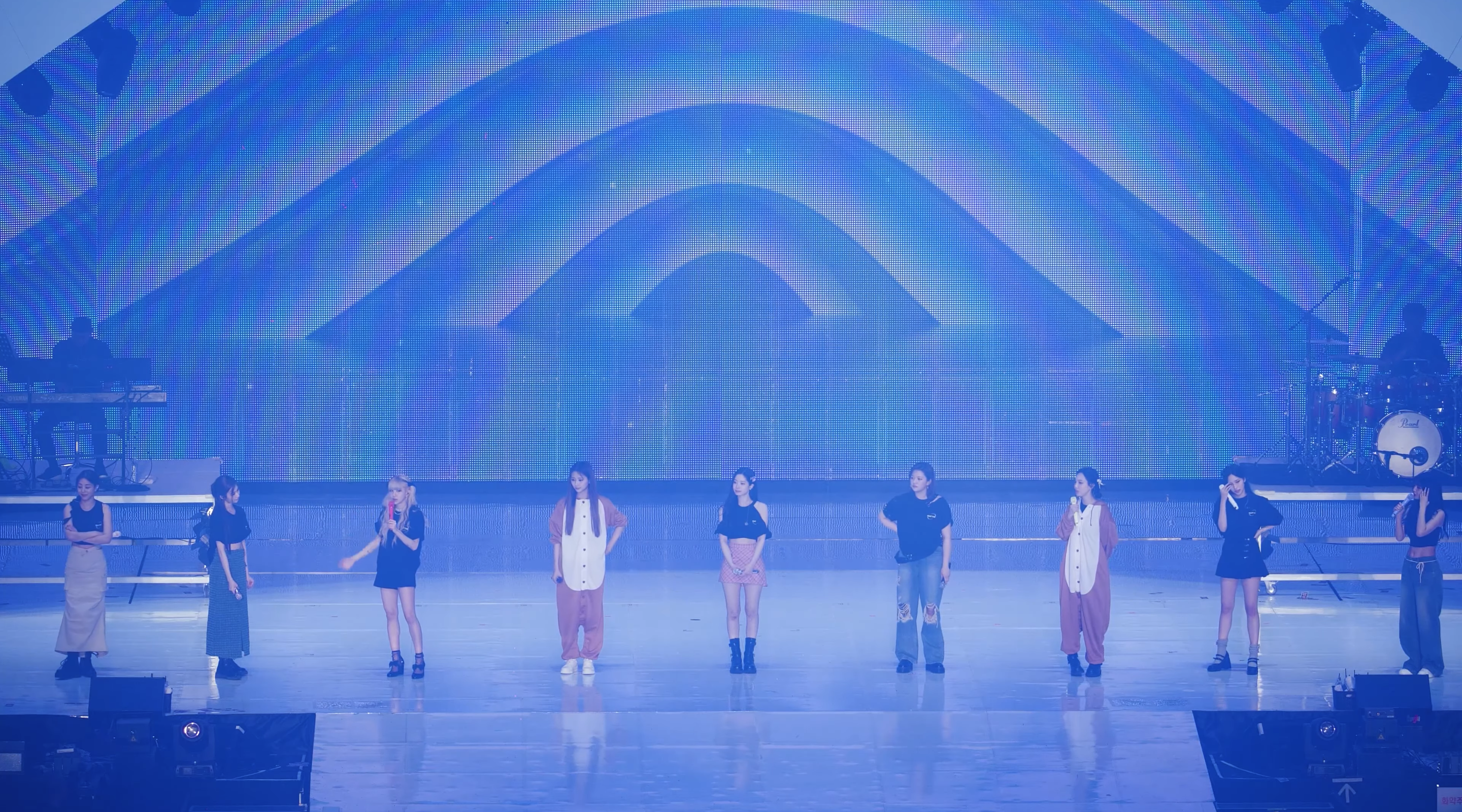
Twice on their fifth world tour

On February 3, 2023, Twice officially revealed the album's title and cover, and announced its release date of March 10, 2023. The group revealed the official tracklist on February 17. On March 4, a pop-up experience was held in Los Angeles in support of the album's release, with Twice personally selling merchandise to fans. On March 6 and 7, the group released two teasers for the music video.

To promote the album, Twice performed "Set Me Free" on The Tonight Show Starring Jimmy Fallon on March 9, and "Moonlight Sunrise" on The Kelly Clarkson Show on March 14. On the album's release date, the Empire State Building was lit up in Twice's official colors in collaboration with non-profit organization Musicians On Call, celebrating the "healing power of music". In April, the group embarked on their fifth world tour in support of the album.

== Critical reception ==
Professional ratings
Review scores
Source	Rating
AllMusic	4/5 stars
IZM	3.5/5 stars
NME	4/5 stars

Rolling Stone's Tim Chan gave the album a positive review, stating that Twice "blows up the tired stereotypes and smashes through barriers with a seven-song set that’s as brash and compelling as anything in the pop music landscape today". Rhian Daly of NME gave the album a rating of four out of five stars, noting that it further refines Twice's sophisticated and retro-inspired sound, despite some "awkward junctures". Lai Frances, writing for Uproxx, praised the group's "newfound image of bringing sophisticated pop with mature themes." AllMusic's Neil Z. Yeung concluded his review by saying Ready to Be keeps "the energy and euphoria at a peak" and "is another serving of addictive pop moments from the confident and stylish nine-piece". Han Seong-hyun from IZM wrote that "while the impressions left by 'Set Me Free' and 'Moonlight Sunrise' are somewhat flat, the rest of the tracks that follow succeed in immediately engaging and immersing the ear". Han nevertheless felt that while Ready to Be "may not be the best", it is "the best result that a 7-year-old group can show."

In June, Rolling Stone included the album on their list of the best albums of 2023 so far. Uproxx included the EP on a similar list, complimenting its production, versatility, as well as the group's live performances. Paste ranked it the 8th best K-pop album of the year, who called it "more sophisticated and mature than ever before with assertive claims of control and defiance made throughout the lyrics".

== Commercial performance ==
On March 8, it was reported that pre-order sales of Ready to Be had surpassed 1.7 million copies, breaking the group's previous album pre-order record. The album debuted at number two on the United States' Billboard 200 with 153,000 album-equivalent units, including 145,500 pure album sales. It marks Twice's fourth US top-10 album and their highest-charting album in the US to date, as well as their biggest week by units sold. The album became the group's fourth best-selling album with over 286,000 pure physical units sold. With this Twice became the first female K-pop act to have three top-three albums and four top-ten albums in the country. The vinyl version sold 18,000 copies, achieving the highest first week vinyl sales in the United States for any all-female group since 1991.

== Track listing ==
Track listing for Ready to Be
No.	Title	Lyrics	Music	Arrangement	Length
1.	"Set Me Free"	Star Wars (Galactika); Jvde (Galactika)	Melanie Fontana; Lindgren; Marty Maro	Lindgren	3:01
2.	"Moonlight Sunrise"	Earattack; Nina Ann Nelson; Kaedi Dalley; Lee Woo-hyun	Earattack; Nina Ann Nelson; Kaedi Dalley; Lee Woo-hyun	Earattack; Lee Woo-hyun	3:00
3.	"Got the Thrills"	MRCH	Lee Woo-min "Collapsedone"; MRCH	Lee Woo-min "Collapsedone"	2:53
4.	"Blame It on Me"	Dahyun	Lee Won-jong; Ciara Muscat	Lee Won-jong	2:40
5.	"Wallflower"	JQ	Peter Rycroft; Tayla Parx; Lara Andersson	Lostboy	2:56
6.	"Crazy Stupid Love"	Dahyun	Young Chance; Shorelle; Greg Bonnick; Hayden Chapman; Lenno Linjama; Sla	LDN Noise; Lenno Linjama	2:49
7.	"Set Me Free" (English version)	Star Wars (Galactika); Jvde (Galactika); Melanie Fontana; Lindgren	Melanie Fontana; Lindgren; Marty Maro	Lindgren	3:01
Total length:					20:24

== Personnel ==
Credits adapted from Melon and album liner notes.

Musicians

- Twice – vocals
  - Dahyun – lyricist (tracks 4 and 6)
- Nicole Neely – strings (tracks 1, 7)
- Earattack – bass, drum programming, keyboard, producer (track 2)
- LDN Noise – producer (track 6)
- Lee Won-jong (이원종) – guitar, producer, keyboard, synthesizer (track 4)
- Lee Woo-hyun (이우현) – bass, drum programming, keyboard, producer (track 2)
- Lee Woo-min "Collapsedone" – electric guitar, keyboards, producer (track 3)
- Lenno Linjama – producer (track 6)
- Lindgren – producer (tracks 1, 7)
- Lostboy – producer (track 5)
- Melanie Fontana – background vocals (tracks 1, 7)
- MRCH – background vocals (track 3)
- Peter Rycroft – all instruments (track 5)
- Shorelle – background vocals (track 6)
- Sophia Pae – background vocals (tracks 2, 4–5, 7)
- Sound Kim – background vocals (track 6)
- Young Chance – background vocals (track 6)

Technical

- Curtis Douglas – mixing (tracks 1, 7)
- Earattack – vocal directing (tracks 2, 5), recording (track 5)
- Friday (Galactika) – vocal directing (track 1)
- Gu Hye-jin (구혜진) – recording (tracks 1–2, 4–5, 7)
- Haneul Lee (이하늘) – immersive mixing
- Im Chan-mi (임찬미) – recording (tracks 1–3, 6–7)
- Jung-hoon Choi (최정훈) – immersive mixing
- Jvde (Galactika) – vocal directing (track 1)
- Kang Sun-young (강선영) – digital editing (track 6)
- Kwon Nam-woo (권남우) – mastering
- Lee Kyung-won (이경원) – digital editing (tracks 1–2, 5, 7)
- Lee Tae-seop (이태섭) – mixing (tracks 2, 4–6)
- Lee Won-jong (이원종) – digital editing, vocal directing (track 4)
- Lee Woo-min "Collapsedone" – computer programming (track 3)
- Nicole Neely – sessions (track 1)
- Park Nam-joon (박남준) – digital editing, mixing (track 3)
- Shin Bong-won (신봉원) – mixing (track 3)
- Sophia Pae – vocal directing (track 7)
- Young Chance – digital editing, vocal directing (track 6)

== Charts ==
=== Weekly charts ===
Weekly chart performance
Chart (2023)	Peak position
Austrian Albums (Ö3 Austria)	11
Belgian Albums (Ultratop Flanders)	14
Belgian Albums (Ultratop Wallonia)	14
Canadian Albums (Billboard)	11
Croatian International Albums (HDU)	2
Finnish Albums (Suomen virallinen lista)	15
French Albums (SNEP)	15
German Albums (Offizielle Top 100)	8
Greek Albums (IFPI)	36
Hungarian Albums (MAHASZ)	7
Italian Albums (FIMI)	72
Japanese Albums (Oricon)	3
Japanese Combined Albums (Oricon)	3
Japanese Hot Albums (Billboard Japan)	15
Polish Albums (ZPAV)	3
Portuguese Albums (AFP)	2
South Korean Albums (Circle)	1
Spanish Albums (Promusicae)	16
Swedish Physical Albums (Sverigetopplistan)	7
Swiss Albums (Schweizer Hitparade)	19
UK Album Downloads (Official Charts)	17
US Billboard 200	2
US World Albums (Billboard)	1

=== Monthly charts ===
Monthly chart performance
Chart (2023)	Peak position
Japanese Albums (Oricon)	6
South Korean Albums (Circle)	1

=== Year-end charts ===
Year-end chart performance
Chart (2023)	Position
Japanese Albums (Oricon)	59
South Korean Albums (Circle)	14
US Billboard 200	178
US World Albums (Billboard)	6

== Certifications and sales ==
Certifications and sales
Region	Certification	Certified units/sales
South Korea (KMCA)	Million	1,000,000^{^}
United States	—	303,000
^{^} Shipments figures based on certification alone.

== Release history ==
Release history and formats for Ready to Be
Region	Date	Format(s)	Label	Ref.
Various	March 10, 2023	CD; digital download; streaming	JYP; Republic	
United States	March 10, 2023	Vinyl	JYP; Republic	
United States	November 17, 2023	Vinyl	JYP; Republic	

== See also ==
- List of 2023 albums
- List of best-selling albums in South Korea
- List of Circle Album Chart number ones of 2023
- List of best-selling girl group albums
- List of K-pop albums on the Billboard charts
