= Talk That Talk (Twice song) =

2022 song by Twice

Single by Twice

from the album Between 1&2
- Language: Korean
- Released: August 26, 2022
- Studio: JYPE Studios (Seoul)
- Genre: Pop; bubblegum pop; dance-pop
- Length: 2:57
- Label: JYP; Republic
- Composers: Lee Woo-min "Collapsedone"; Like (MRCH)
- Lyricist: Danke

Twice singles chronology
"Celebrate" (2022)	"Talk That Talk" (2022)	"Moonlight Sunrise" (2023)

Music video
- "Talk That Talk" on YouTube

"Talk That Talk" is a song recorded by South Korean girl group Twice for their eleventh extended play, Between 1&2 (2022). The song was released on August 26, 2022, by JYP Entertainment and Republic Records as the album's lead single. It is a pop, bubblegum pop, and dance-pop song that incorporates 80s newtro-inspired production, composed by longtime collaborator Lee Woo-min "Collapsedone" and Like (MRCH). Written by Danke, the song revolves around a protagonist encouraging the other person to share everything on their mind.

"Talk That Talk" received generally favorable reviews from critics for its mature, bubblegum, and retro production. The song peaked at number 20 on the Circle Digital Chart, at number 18 on the Billboard Global 200, and within the top-10 in numerous countries, including Japan, Hong Kong, Taiwan, Malaysia, Singapore, the Philippines and Vietnam. To promote the single, the group performed it on MTV's show Fresh Out Live and on South Korean music programs such as Music Bank, Show! Music Core, and Inkigayo.

== Background and composition ==
"Talk That Talk" was composed by Lee Woo-min "Collapsedone", who previously co-composed some of Twice's singles, such as "Knock Knock" and "The Feels". It is a pop, bubblegum pop, and dance-pop track that incorporate 80s newtro-inspired sound and "lush" synths production. The song starts with a melody similar to "TT," while the rest of the song "dive[s] into an exciting future with dizzying speed, culminating in a captivating chorus". In terms of musical notation, the song is written in the key of E-flat minor with a tempo of 120 beats per minute. Member Dahyun described it as an "addictive" retro pop song "that reminds you of the year 2000". Jeongyeon noted that the song's concept is Y2K, and the track embodies the retro concept.

The lyrics, written by the lyricist team Danke, are about "trying to get the other person to say everything on their mind", which relates to the theme of the music video, where Twice undertakes a mission to make their fandom, Once, say "I love you" to Twice. Danke explained that with "Talk That Talk", they aimed for listeners to immediately recognize it as a quintessential Twice song. They wanted to express a simple love story in an intuitive and charming way, imagining how the character of "Do It Again", from Twice's debut album The Story Begins (2015), would behave in a relationship seven years later. While the character in "Do It Again" excitedly declares "You finally said you like me!", the speaker in "Talk That Talk" reflects a more mature understanding of love, encouraging open communication. By comparing these perspectives, they hope that listeners will appreciate the evolution in Twice's music.

== Release and promotion ==
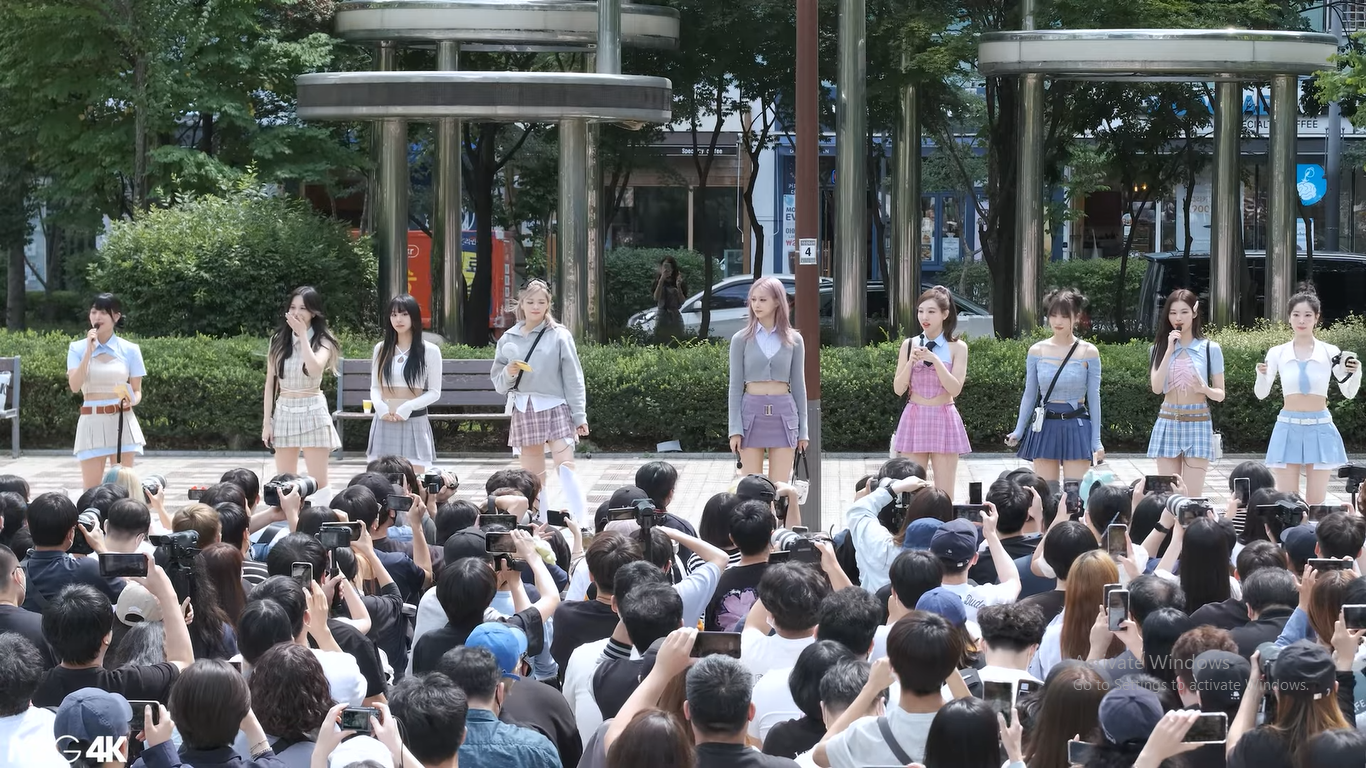
Twice speaking to fans after recording "Talk That Talk" for Show! Music Core on September 3, 2022

In July 2022, Twice announced they would release their eleventh EP, Between 1&2, on August 26, 2022. On July 26, the track list was released, revealing "Talk That Talk" as the lead single. On August 9, the group released a concept video along with a snippet of the single on TikTok. The EP was released on August 26, along with a music video for "Talk That Talk". Twice held a livestream on the afternoon of August 26 to communicate with fans. Additionally, Twice performed "Talk That Talk" on the MTV show Fresh Out Live on the same day. This was followed by performances on Music Bank, Show! Music Core and Inkigayo to promote the song. Jihyo was not present during the first week of promotion after she tested positive for COVID-19.

The Japanese version of "Talk That Talk" was released as a digital single on April 14, 2025, ahead of Twice's fifth compilation album #Twice5.

== Reception ==
Professional ratings
Review scores
Source	Rating
IZM	3/5 stars

IZM's Kim Seong-wook rated the song 3 out of 5 stars, noting the group's contract renewal after overcoming "the 7-year jinx". Kim highlights their blend of past musical elements like the synth sounds of "I Can't Stop Me" (2020) and "Scientist" (2021) with the funky groove of "The Feels" (2021), which pairs nostalgic lyrics and strong vocals with a retro melody. Tanu I. Raj of NME retro-pop track showcasing Twice's evolution, blending a nostalgic "TT" (2016) like intro with a fresh, fast-paced and "sweet as it is seductive" production. Billboard's Glenn Rowley highlighted the song as one of the top K-pop songs of 2022, praising its Y2K-themed video, fizzy production, and explosive chorus that further solidifies the group's reputation as masters of bubblegum pop. Teen Vogue included the song in their year-end list, recognizing Twice's seven-year journey in the industry and their musical growth. "Talk That Talk" was highlighted for enhancing Twice's signature synth sounds with charisma and boldness, embodying their funky style. Additionally, the song reflects the group's diverse musical evolution, marking a departure from their earlier, more innocent image to reveal a more refined and confident image. In 2023, the single received a nomination at the Circle Chart Music Awards in the category Artist of the Year – Global Digital Music (August).

Year-end lists for "Talk That Talk"
Critic/Publication	List	Rank	Ref.
Billboard	The 25 Best K-Pop Songs of 2022	16	
Teen Vogue	The 79 Best K-Pop Songs of 2022	Placed	
The Telegraph	Top 20 K-Pop Hits of the Year	11	
CNN Philippines	CNN Philippines' 25 Favorite K-pop Songs of 2022	Placed	
Cosmopolitan	The 15 Best K-pop Songs of 2022	7	
Dazed	The Best K-pop Tracks of 2022	9	
GQ Korea	Songs That Tore Up TikTok in 2022	Placed	
Her Campus	15 Best K-Pop Girl Group Songs Of 2022	8	

== Commercial success ==
"Talk That Talk" achieved notable chart success across various countries.The song peaked at number 20 on the Circle Digital Chart, and number 18 on the Billboard Global 200. It also achieved top-10 positions in several countries, including Japan, Hong Kong, Taiwan, Malaysia, Singapore, the Philippines, and Vietnam.

== Music video ==
On August 24 and 25, 2022, Twice released two teasers for the music video of "Talk That Talk". The next day, on August 26, both the song and music video were released.

A scene in the music video where Twice is dancing in an abstract Y2K-themed set.

The music video is about Twice looking for codes, on a mission to confess their love to their fandom, Once. The concept of the video is Y2K and features fragments of Y2K-themed images and styles. At the end of the music video, a QR code appears that directs fans to a photo and "heartfelt message" on the group's Instagram account from November 3, 2015 – the day the official fan club name, Once, was decided. This symbolic gesture reflects Twice's appreciation for their fans and their journey together since the group's debut.

One of the scenes in the music video shows Chaeyoung running with a sledgehammer and then turning to Nayeon swinging the sledgehammer into the screen of cats. This particular scene is a parody of Apple's famous 1984 commercial.

== Credits and personnel ==
Credits adapted from Melon.

- Twice – vocals
- Danke (Lalala Studio) – lyricist
- Lee Woo-min "Collapsedone" – composer, arranger, synthesizer, bass, guitar, computer programming, vocal director
- MRCH – background vocals, composer, arranger, computer programming, vocal director
- Eom Se-hee – recording
- Lee Sang-yeop – recording
- Goo Hye-jin – recording
- Tony Maserati – mixing
- Kwon Nam-woo – mastering

== Charts ==
=== Weekly charts ===
Weekly chart performance
Chart (2022)	Peak position
Australia (ARIA)	68
Canada Hot 100 (Billboard)	65
Hong Kong (Billboard)	4
Global 200 (Billboard)	18
Japan Hot 100 (Billboard)	7
Japan Combined Singles (Oricon)	10
Malaysia (Billboard)	4
Netherlands (Global 40)	22
New Zealand Hot Singles (RMNZ)	6
Philippines (Billboard)	4
Singapore (Billboard)	2
Singapore (RIAS)	3
South Korea (Circle)	20
Taiwan (Billboard)	2
UK Indie (Official Charts)	31
US Bubbling Under Hot 100 (Billboard)	16
US World Digital Song Sales (Billboard)	4
Vietnam (Vietnam Hot 100)	7

=== Monthly charts ===
Monthly chart performance
Chart (2022)	Peak position
South Korea (Circle)	25

=== Year-end charts ===
Year-end chart performance
Chart (2022)	Position
South Korea (Circle)	161

== Certifications ==
Streaming certifications for "Talk That Talk"
Region	Certification	Certified units/sales
Japan (RIAJ)	Platinum	100,000,000^{†}
^{†} Streaming-only figures based on certification alone.

== Release history ==
Release dates and formats
Region	Date	Format(s)	Label(s)	Ref.
Various	August 26, 2022	Digital download; streaming	JYP; Republic	
