= Between 1&2 =

2022 extended play by Twice

- Digital cover

EP by Twice
- Released: August 26, 2022
- Studio: JYPE Studios (Seoul)
- Genre: K-pop
- Length: 22:07
- Languages: Korean; English
- Labels: JYP; Republic

Twice chronology
Celebrate (2022)	Between 1&2 (2022)	Ready to Be (2023)

Singles from Between 1&2
- 1. "Talk That Talk" Released: August 26, 2022

Between 1&2 (stylized as BETW9EN 1&2) is the eleventh extended play (EP) by South Korean girl group Twice. It was released on August 26, 2022, by JYP Entertainment and Republic Records and consists of seven tracks, including the lead single "Talk That Talk", which reached the top 20 of the Circle Digital Chart and the Billboard Global 200.

The album was a commercial success, exceeding 1 million pre-orders, making Twice the third female K-pop group to do so at the time after Blackpink and Aespa. In South Korea, the album debuted at number two on the Circle Album Chart with nearly 1 million physical copies sold. In the United States, it debuted at number three on the Billboard 200 with 100,000 equivalent album units and became the sixth best-selling album of 2022 in CD album sales. The album also reached the top ten in Japan, Finland, Poland, Sweden, Uruguay, and Croatia.

== Background ==
Between 1&2 followed Celebrate, Twice's fourth Japanese studio album, and served as the group's first Korean release in 2022. On May 16, after concluding their second worldwide concert tour in Los Angeles, a cryptic post featuring the dates "2022.06.24" and "2022.08.26" (Note: Signifying June 24, 2022, and August 26, 2022.) circulated Twice's social media accounts, leading to fan speculation. June 24 was later revealed as the release date for Nayeon's solo debut EP, Im Nayeon.

On July 2, while hosting an episode of MBC's Show! Music Core, Twice member Dahyun announced that Twice would be making a comeback, stating that "it is planned, so please look forward to it". On July 12, all members of Twice renewed their contracts with JYP Entertainment. One day later, the label announced a "mini album" titled Between 1&2 with a planned release date of August 26.

== Title and composition ==
Similar to Formula of Love: O+T=<3, the EP's title, Between 1&2, represents the connection of Twice with their fandom, Once. Members Chaeyoung, Dahyun, and Jihyo wrote lyrics of some songs on Between 1&2, with the latter also being credited as a composer on the song "Trouble". The EP's second track, "Queen of Hearts", an English song, features a drum beat and guitar sound mixed with Twice's "cool" vocals in harmony. "Brave" was described as a dance-pop track centered on the group's fandom, called Once, which "gives Twice the courage to become themselves". Lyrically, the song expresses "the sincerity of Twice members".

== Release and promotion ==
A promotional poster with the phrase "Tell Me What You Want" written above a light switch was posted onto Twice's social media accounts on July 13, 2022. On July 26, the tracklist of Between 1&2 was released. On August 5, JYP Entertainment released a timetable for the EP. On August 9, Twice released an opening trailer for the EP and a snippet of lead single "Talk That Talk". On August 17 and 18, individual teasers and group photos demonstrating the concept of the album were posted on Twice's official social media accounts. On August 19, the group released snippets of the second track, "Queen of Hearts", and fifth track, "Brave". On August 23, the group released a sneak peek to the album. On August 24 and 25, the group released two teasers for the music video of "Talk That Talk".

== Critical reception ==
Professional ratings
Review scores
Source	Rating
AllMusic	3.5/5 stars
NME	3/5 stars
The Quietus	Favorable

Writing for NME, Tanu I. Raj noted that while Between 1&2 looks back on Twice's "growth with fondness and pride, and leave[s] us with the promise of better things to come", it suffers from some "road bumps".

== Commercial performance ==
On August 25, 2022, it was reported that pre-order sales of Between 1&2 had surpassed 1 million copies, exceeding Twice's previous career high of 700,000 pre-orders for Formula of Love: O+T=<3, and making Twice the third female K-pop group to exceed 1 million pre-orders after Blackpink and Aespa. Between 1&2 debuted at number 2 on South Korea's Circle Album Chart with 995,614 units sold. In Japan, it debuted at number 4 on Oricon's Digital Albums Chart and at number 10 on Billboard Japan's Hot Albums chart. In October 2022, it became Twice's first album to be certified Million by the Korea Music Content Association.

In the United States, the EP peaked at number 3 on the Billboard 200 with over 100,000 equivalent album units. Of these, 94,000 were pure sales, 6,000 were streaming-equivalent units, and a negligible number were track-equivalent units. It is their fifth and best selling album on the chart after Formula of Love: O+T=<3. According to Luminate's Year-End U.S. Report, Between 1&2 was the sixth best-selling CD album of 2022 in the United States, with 199,000 copies sold.

== Track listing ==
Track listing for Between 1&2
No.	Title	Lyrics	Music	Arrangement	Length
1.	"Talk That Talk"	Danke	Lee Woo-min "Collapsedone"; MRCH	Collapsedone; MRCH	2:57
2.	"Queen of Hearts"	Greg Bonnick; Hayden Chapman; Paulina Cerrilla; Kyler Niko	Bonnick; Chapman; Cerrilla; Niko	LDN Noise	3:06
3.	"Basics"	Chaeyoung	Barry Cohen; Gray Trainer; Kelsey Klingensmith; Musikality	Gingerbread; Trainer	2:56
4.	"Trouble"	Jihyo	Jihyo; Earattack; Chan's; Justin Reinstein; JJean; Darm	Earattack; Chan's; Darm	3:35
5.	"Brave"	Lee Seu-ran; Jo Yoon-kyung; Slow Rabbit; No Ju-hwan	Slow Rabbit; Melanie Fontana; Lindgren; Louise Frick Sveen; Maria Marcus; Ollipop; Jonna Hall; Sophia Pae; Kyler Niko; Paulina Cerrilla	Slow Rabbit	3:09
6.	"Gone"	Dahyun	Natalie Dunn; Ella McMahon; Shakka Philip; Yannick Rastogi; Zacharie Raymond	Banx & Ranx	3:15
7.	"When We Were Kids"	Dahyun	Christian Fast; Johannes Willinder; Malin Johansson	Fast; Willinder; Johansson	3:09
Total length:					22:07

== Personnel ==
Credits are adapted from the album's liner notes.

Musicians

- Twice – vocals (All tracks)
  - Jihyo – vocal director, background vocals (Track 4)
- Lee Woo-min "collapsedone" – synth, bass, guitar (Track 1)
- MRCH – background vocals (Track 1)
- Sophia Pae – background vocals (Track 2, 3, 5, 6, 7)
- Graux – guitar (Track 2)
- Gray Trainer – guitar (Track 3)
- Gingerbread – percussion (Track 3)
- earattack – all instruments, synthesizer, piano, drum programming (Track 4)
- chAN's – all instruments, synthesizer, piano, drum programming (Track 4)
- Darm – all instruments, synthesizer, piano, drum programming (Track 4)
- Slow Rabbit – keyboard, synthesizer (Track 5)
- Young – guitar (Track 5)
- Yannick Rastogi – all instruments, synths, bass, drums (Track 6)
- Zacharie Raymond – all instruments, synths, bass, drums (Track 6)
- Johannes Willinder – keyboards (Track 7)

Technical

- Lee Woo-min "collapsedone" – programming, vocals directing (Track 1)
- MRCH – programming, vocals directing (Track 1)
- Eom Se-hee – recording (All tracks)
- Lee Sang-yeop – recording (All tracks)
- Goo Hye-jin – recording (All tracks)
- Tony Maserati – mixing (Track 1)
- David K. Younghyun – mixing (Track 1)
- Kwon Nam-woo – mastering (All tracks)
- Sophia Pae – vocal director (Track 2, 3, 6, 7)
- Jiyoung Shin – additional editor (Track 2, 6)
- Lee Tae-seop – mixing (Track 2, 4, 6)
- Gingerbread – programming (Track 3)
- Lee Kyung-won – digital editing (Track 3, 4, 7)
- Im Hong-jin – mixing (Track 3, 7)
- earattack – vocal director (Track 4)
- Slow Rabbit – vocal director, digital editing (Track 5)
- YANG GA – mixing (Track 5)
- Yannick Rastogi – programming, recording (Track 6)
- Zacharie Raymond – programming, recording (Track 6)
- Johannes Willinder – programming (Track 7)

== Charts ==
=== Weekly charts ===
Weekly chart performance
Chart (2022–2023)	Peak position
Belgian Albums (Ultratop Flanders)	36
Belgian Albums (Ultratop Wallonia)	141
Croatian International Albums (HDU)	3
Canadian Albums (Billboard)	40
Finnish Albums (Suomen virallinen lista)	6
Hungarian Albums (MAHASZ)	25
Japanese Albums (Oricon)	2
Japanese Combined Albums (Oricon)	3
Japanese Hot Albums (Billboard Japan)	10
Polish Albums (ZPAV)	5
South Korean Albums (Circle)	2
Swedish Physical Albums (Sverigetopplistan)	4
Swiss Albums (Schweizer Hitparade)	72
UK Album Downloads (Official Charts)	23
Uruguayan Albums (CUD)	3
US Billboard 200	3
US World Albums (Billboard)	1

=== Monthly charts ===
Monthly chart performance
Chart (2022)	Peak position
South Korean Albums (Circle)	2

=== Year-end charts ===
Year-end chart performance
Chart (2022)	Position
Japanese Albums (Oricon)	66
South Korean Albums (Circle)	16

== Certifications and sales ==
Certifications and sales
Region	Certification	Certified units/sales
South Korea (KMCA)	Million	1,000,000^{^}
United States	—	199,000
Japan	—	53,170
^{^} Shipments figures based on certification alone.

== See also ==
- List of certified albums in South Korea
