= Pentatonix: The World Tour =

2019–23 concert tour by Pentatonix

- Tour by Pentatonix
- Associated albums: The Lucky Ones; At Home EP; PTX Japan 5th Anniversary Greatest Hits
- Start date: May 11, 2019
- End date: September 16, 2023
- Legs: 6
- No. of shows: 84

Pentatonix concert chronology
- Christmas Is Here! Tour (2018); Pentatonix: The World Tour (2019–23); Pentatonix: The Evergreen Christmas Tour (2021)

Pentatonix: The World Tour was the ninth concert tour by American a cappella group Pentatonix to promote their greatest hits. The tour began on May 11, 2019, in Oakland, and concluded on September 16, 2023, in Puyallup, WA.

== Background and development ==
On February 7, 2019, the group announced they were going on a world tour. Dates were first announced for North America. Rachel Platten was announced as the opening act. On March 10, 2020, the group announced the European leg was postponed to May 1, 2023, amid the coronavirus pandemic.

== Set list ==
This set list is from the concert on May 22, 2023 at the MidFlorida Credit Union in Tampa Bay, Florida. It is not intended to represent all shows from the tour.

1. "Radioactive" (Imagine Dragons cover)
2. "I Rise"
3. "Can't Sleep Love"
4. "Aha!" (Imogen Heap cover)
5. "The Sound of Silence" (Simon and Garfunkel cover)
6. "Love Me When I Don't"
7. "The Lucky Ones Medley" (contains elements of "The Lucky Ones", "Be My Eyes", "Coffee in Bed", "Easy Love" and "Never Gonna Cry Again")
8. "Daft Punk"
9. "Jolene" (Dolly Parton cover) ((with Lauren Alaina))
10. "Creep" (Radiohead cover)
11. "Kevin's Fifth" (Kevin Olusola celloboxing and Matt Sallee drum collaboration)
12. "Dreams" (The Cranberries cover) ((Scott Hoying, Kirstin Maldonado, and Mitch Grassi only))
13. "Always Remember Us This Way/Shallow" (Bradley Cooper and Lady Gaga cover)
14. "Side"
15. "White Winter Hymnal" (Fleet Foxes cover)
16. "Matt and Kevin audience participation" (Kevin Olusola & Matt Sallee only) (contains elements of "My Girl", "Sweet Caroline", "I Want It That Way", "This Is How We Do It", "The Fresh Prince of Bel-Air", "Drop It Like It's Hot", "Don't Stop Believin'", "Livin' on a Prayer", "You Give Love a Bad Name" and "We Will Rock You")
17. "90s Dance Medley"
18. "Hallelujah" (Leonard Cohen cover)
  Encore
19. "My Heart with You" (The Rescues cover)
20. "Bohemian Rhapsody" (Queen cover)

== Tour dates ==
List of concerts, showing date, city, country, venue, tickets sold, number of available tickets and gross revenue
Date	City	Country	Venue	Opening act(s)	Attendance	Revenue
North America
May 11, 2019	Oakland	United States	Oracle Arena	Rachel Platten; Citizen Queen	10,298 / 10,298	$523,605
May 14, 2019	Fresno	United States	Save Mart Center	Rachel Platten; Citizen Queen	—N/a	—N/a
May 16, 2019	Inglewood	United States	The Forum	Rachel Platten; Citizen Queen	—N/a	—N/a
May 19, 2019	Denver	United States	Pepsi Center	Rachel Platten; Citizen Queen	—N/a	—N/a
May 21, 2019	Tulsa	United States	BOK Center	Rachel Platten; Citizen Queen	—N/a	—N/a
May 23, 2019	San Antonio	United States	AT&T Center	Rachel Platten; Citizen Queen	—N/a	—N/a
May 25, 2019	Huntsville	United States	Propst Arena	Rachel Platten; Citizen Queen	—N/a	—N/a
May 26, 2019	Louisville	United States	KFC Yum! Center	Rachel Platten; Citizen Queen	—N/a	—N/a
May 30, 2019	Greensboro	United States	Greensboro Coliseum	Rachel Platten; Citizen Queen	—N/a	—N/a
June 1, 2019	Orlando	United States	Amway Center	Rachel Platten; Citizen Queen	8,469 / 8,469	$522,697
June 2, 2019	Augusta	United States	James Brown Arena	Rachel Platten; Citizen Queen	—N/a	—N/a
June 4, 2019	Allentown	United States	PPL Center	Rachel Platten; Citizen Queen	—N/a	—N/a
June 6, 2019	New York City	United States	Madison Square Garden	Rachel Platten; Citizen Queen	8,246 / 8,246	$530,426
June 8, 2019	Worcester	United States	DCU Center	Rachel Platten; Citizen Queen	7,213 / 7,213	$429,494
June 9, 2019	Atlantic City	United States	Hard Rock Live	Rachel Platten; Citizen Queen	—N/a	—N/a
June 11, 2019	Montreal	Canada	Bell Centre	Rachel Platten; Citizen Queen	—N/a	—N/a
June 13, 2019	Uncasville	United States	Mohegan Sun Arena	Rachel Platten; Citizen Queen	—N/a	—N/a
June 15, 2019	Grand Rapids	United States	Van Andel Arena	Rachel Platten; Citizen Queen	9,366 / 9,366	$589,717
June 16, 2019	Columbus	United States	Nationwide Arena	Rachel Platten; Citizen Queen	9,192 / 9,192	$453,450
June 18, 2019	Milwaukee	United States	Fiserv Forum	Rachel Platten; Citizen Queen	9,694 / 9,694	$474,141
June 20, 2019	Nashville	United States	Bridgestone Arena	Rachel Platten; Citizen Queen	—N/a	—N/a
June 22, 2019	Moline	United States	TaxSlayer Center	Rachel Platten; Citizen Queen	—N/a	—N/a
June 23, 2019	Green Bay	United States	Resch Center	Rachel Platten; Citizen Queen	6,701 / 6,701	$552,044
June 25, 2019	Saint Paul	United States	Xcel Energy Center	Rachel Platten; Citizen Queen	11,549 / 11,549	$699,863
June 26, 2019	Fargo	United States	Fargodome	Rachel Platten; Citizen Queen	—N/a	—N/a
June 28, 2019	Calgary	Canada	Scotiabank Saddledome	Rachel Platten; Citizen Queen	—N/a	—N/a
June 30, 2019	Edmonton	Canada	Rogers Place	Rachel Platten; Citizen Queen	—N/a	—N/a
July 2, 2019	Vancouver	Canada	Rogers Arena	Rachel Platten; Citizen Queen	—N/a	—N/a
July 3, 2019	Tacoma	United States	Tacoma Dome	Rachel Platten; Citizen Queen	—N/a	—N/a
July 6, 2019	Las Vegas	United States	Mandalay Bay Events Center	Rachel Platten; Citizen Queen	—N/a	—N/a
July 7, 2019	Stateline	United States	Lake Tahoe Outdoor Arena	Rachel Platten; Citizen Queen	—N/a	—N/a
August 11, 2019	Maryland Heights	United States	Hollywood Casino Amphitheatre	Rachel Platten	8,756 / 8,756	$363,320
August 13, 2019	Kansas City	United States	Starlight Theatre	Rachel Platten	7,048 / 7,048	$472,527
August 14, 2019	Springfield	United States	Illinois State Fair	Rachel Platten	—N/a	—N/a
August 15, 2019	Highland Park	United States	Ravinia Pavilion	Rachel Platten	—N/a	—N/a
August 17, 2019	Des Moines	United States	Iowa State Fairgrounds	Rachel Platten	—N/a	—N/a
August 19, 2019	Brandon	United States	Brandon Amphitheater	Rachel Platten	—N/a	—N/a
August 20, 2019	Orange Beach	United States	The Amphitheater at The Wharf	Rachel Platten	—N/a	—N/a
August 22, 2019	Tuscaloosa	United States	Tuscaloosa Amphitheater	Rachel Platten	—N/a	—N/a
August 24, 2019	Jacksonville	United States	Daily's Place	Rachel Platten	4,599 / 4,599	$394,166
August 26, 2019	Columbia	United States	Merriweather Post Pavilion	Rachel Platten	7,837 / 7,837	$485,985
August 27, 2019	Hopewell	United States	Marvin Sands Amphitheater	Rachel Platten	7,100 / 7,100	$371,664
August 29, 2019	Gilford	United States	Bank of New Hampshire Pavilion	Rachel Platten	—N/a	—N/a
August 31, 2019	Bethel	United States	Bethel Woods Center for the Arts	Rachel Platten	—N/a	—N/a
September 1, 2019	Canfield	United States	Canfield Fairgrounds	Rachel Platten	—N/a	—N/a
Latin America
October 15, 2019	Mexico City	Mexico	Teatro Metropólitan	—N/a	—N/a	—N/a
October 16, 2019	Guadalajara	Mexico	Teatro Diana	—N/a	—N/a	—N/a
October 20, 2019	Buenos Aires	Argentina	Teatro Vorterix	—N/a	—N/a	—N/a
October 22, 2019	Curitiba	Brazil	Teatro Positivo	Giulia Be	—N/a	—N/a
October 24, 2019	Rio de Janeiro	Brazil	Vivo Rio	Giulia Be	—N/a	—N/a
October 26, 2019	São Paulo	Brazil	Tom Brasil	Giulia Be	—N/a	—N/a
Asia
January 30, 2020	Yokohama	Japan	National Convention Hall	—N/a	—N/a	—N/a
February 1, 2020	Sapporo	Japan	Sapporo Cultural Arts Theater	—N/a	—N/a	—N/a
February 3, 2020	Nagoya	Japan	Nagoya Century Hall	—N/a	—N/a	—N/a
February 4, 2020	Tokyo	Japan	Tokyo International Forum	—N/a	—N/a	—N/a
February 6. 2020	Osaka	Japan	Osaka Festival Hall	—N/a	—N/a	—N/a
February 8, 2020	Quezon City	Philippines	Smart Araneta Coliseum	—N/a	—N/a	—N/a
February 11, 2020	Singapore		The Star Performing Arts Centre	—N/a	—N/a	—N/a
Oceania
February 15, 2020	Auckland	New Zealand	Spark Arena	—N/a	—N/a	—N/a
February 17, 2020	Brisbane	Australia	BCEC Great Hall	—N/a	—N/a	—N/a
February 19, 2020	Adelaide	Australia	AEC Theatre	—N/a	—N/a	—N/a
February 20, 2020	Melbourne	Australia	Margaret Court Arena	—N/a	—N/a	—N/a
February 22, 2020	Sydney	Australia	First State Super Theatre	—N/a	—N/a	—N/a
Asia
March 6, 2023	Singapore		The Star Performing Arts Centre	—N/a	—N/a	—N/a
March 8, 2023	Osaka	Japan	Grand Cube Osaka	—N/a	—N/a	—N/a
March 9, 2023	Tokyo	Japan	Tokyo Garden Theater	—N/a	—N/a	—N/a
March 11, 2023	Tokyo	Japan	Tokyo Garden Theater	—N/a	—N/a	—N/a
March 14, 2023	Nagoya	Japan	Nagoya Century Hall	—N/a	—N/a	—N/a
Oceania
March 18, 2023	Adelaide	Australia	AEC Theatre	Bella Taylor Smith	—N/a	—N/a
March 20, 2023	Perth	Australia	HBF Stadium	Bella Taylor Smith	—N/a	—N/a
March 22, 2023	Brisbane	Australia	Brisbane Entertainment Centre	Bella Taylor Smith	—N/a	—N/a
March 25, 2023	Sydney	Australia	Aware Super Theatre	Bella Taylor Smith	—N/a	—N/a
March 26, 2023	Melbourne	Australia	Margaret Court Arena	Bella Taylor Smith	—N/a	—N/a
March 28, 2023	Auckland	New Zealand	Spark Arena	Georgia Lines	—N/a	—N/a
Europe
May 1, 2023	Manchester	England	O_{2} Apollo Manchester	Ellie Dixon	—N/a	—N/a
May 3, 2023	London	England	Eventim Apollo	Ellie Dixon	—N/a	—N/a
May 4, 2023	London	England	Eventim Apollo	Ellie Dixon	—N/a	—N/a
May 7, 2023	Brussels	Belgium	Forest National	Ellie Dixon	—N/a	—N/a
May 8, 2023	Esch-sur-Alzette	Luxembourg	Rockhal	Ellie Dixon	—N/a	—N/a
May 10, 2023	Amsterdam	Netherlands	AFAS Live	Ellie Dixon	—N/a	—N/a
May 11, 2023	Amsterdam	Netherlands	AFAS Live	Ellie Dixon	—N/a	—N/a
May 13, 2023	Zürich	Switzerland	The Hall	Ellie Dixon	—N/a	—N/a
May 15, 2023	Warsaw	Poland	Arena COS Torwar	Ellie Dixon	—N/a	—N/a
May 17, 2023	Vienna	Austria	Wiener Stadthalle	Ellie Dixon	—N/a	—N/a
May 18, 2023	Linz	Austria	TipsArena Linz	Ellie Dixon	—N/a	—N/a
May 20, 2023	Graz	Austria	Stadthalle Graz	Ellie Dixon	—N/a	—N/a
May 22, 2023	Budapest	Hungary	Budapest Sports Arena	Ellie Dixon	—N/a	—N/a
May 23, 2023	Prague	Czech Republic	O_{2} Arena	Ellie Dixon	—N/a	—N/a
May 25, 2023	Milan	Italy	Mediolanum Forum	Ellie Dixon	—N/a	—N/a
May 27, 2023	Berlin	Germany	Columbiahalle	Ellie Dixon	—N/a	—N/a
May 28, 2023	Cologne	Germany	Palladium	Ellie Dixon	—N/a	—N/a
May 30, 2023	Paris	France	Salle Pleyel	Ellie Dixon	—N/a	—N/a
May 31, 2023	Paris	France	Salle Pleyel	Ellie Dixon	—N/a	—N/a
June 3, 2023	Reykjavík	Iceland	Laugardalshöll		—N/a	—N/a
North America
August 9, 2023	Jacksonville	United States	Daily's Place	Lauren Alaina	—N/a	—N/a
August 10, 2023	Tampa	United States	MidFlorida Credit Union Amphitheatre	Lauren Alaina	—N/a	—N/a
August 12, 2023	Bristow	United States	Jiffy Lube Live	Lauren Alaina	—N/a	—N/a
August 13, 2023	Charlotte	United States	PNC Music Pavlion	Lauren Alaina	—N/a	—N/a
August 15, 2023	Alpharetta	United States	Ameris Bank Amphitheatre	Lauren Alaina	—N/a	—N/a
August 17, 2023	Cuyahoga Falls	United States	Blossom Music Center	Lauren Alaina	—N/a	—N/a
August 19, 2023	Raleigh	United States	Coastal Credit Union Park	Lauren Alaina	—N/a	—N/a
August 20, 2023	Holmdel	United States	PNC Bank Arts Center	Lauren Alaina	—N/a	—N/a
August 22, 2023	Toronto	Canada	Budweiser Stage	Lauren Alaina	—N/a	—N/a
August 23, 2023	Saratoga	United States	Saratoga Performing Arts Center	Lauren Alaina	—N/a	—N/a
August 24, 2023	Syracuse	United States	St. Joesph's Health Amphitheater at Lakeview	Lauren Alaina	—N/a	—N/a
August 26, 2023	Noblesville	United States	Ruoff Music Center	Lauren Alaina	—N/a	—N/a
August 28, 2023	Maryland Heights	United States	Hollywood Casino Amphitheatre	Lauren Alaina	—N/a	—N/a
August 29, 2023	Cincinnati	United States	Riverbend Music Center	Lauren Alaina	—N/a	—N/a
August 31, 2023	Milwaukee	United States	American Family Insurance Amphitheater	Lauren Alaina	—N/a	—N/a
September 2, 2023	Tinley Park	United States	Hollywood Casino Amphitheatre	Lauren Alaina	—N/a	—N/a
September 3, 2023	Clarkston	United States	Pine Knob Music Theatre	Lauren Alaina	—N/a	—N/a
September 6, 2023	Dallas	United States	Dos Equis Pavilion	Lauren Alaina	—N/a	—N/a
September 7, 2023	The Woodlands	United States	Cynthia Woods Mitchell Pavilion	Lauren Alaina	—N/a	—N/a
September 9, 2023	Phoenix	United States	Talking Stick Resort Amphitheatre	Lauren Alaina	—N/a	—N/a
September 11, 2023	Irvine	United States	FivePoint Amphitheatre	Lauren Alaina	—N/a	—N/a
September 12, 2023	Mountain View	United States	Shoreline Amphitheatre	Lauren Alaina	—N/a	—N/a
September 14, 2023	Ridgefield	United States	RV Inn Style Resorts Amphitheater	Lauren Alaina	—N/a	—N/a
September 16, 2023	Puyallup	United States	Washington State Fair Events Center	Lauren Alaina	—N/a	—N/a
Total					116,068 / 116,068 (100%)	$6,863,099
