= Moonlight Sunrise =

2023 song by Twice

Single by Twice

from the EP Ready to Be
- Released: January 20, 2023
- Studio: JYPE Studios (Seoul)
- Genre: Miami bass; R&B; pop
- Length: 3:00
- Label: JYP; Republic
- Songwriters: Earattack; Nina Ann Nelson; Kaedi Dalley; Lee Woo-hyun
- Producers: Earattack; Lee Woo-hyun

Twice singles chronology
"Talk That Talk" (2022)	"Moonlight Sunrise" (2023)	"Set Me Free" (2023)

Twice English singles chronology
"The Feels" (2021)	"Moonlight Sunrise" (2023)	"I Got You" (2024)

Music video
- "Moonlight Sunrise" on YouTube

"Moonlight Sunrise" is a song recorded by South Korean girl group Twice. It was released as their second original English-language single on January 20, 2023, through JYP Entertainment and Republic Records. It serves as a pre-release single of the group's twelfth extended play, Ready to Be, released in March. It is primarily an upbeat Miami bass, R&B and pop track that incorporates house, synth-pop, and dreamy elements in its production.

"Moonlight Sunrise" received generally favorable reviews from critics, who praised the song's sultry lyrics and its fun, miami bass production, showing a new side of Twice. The track peaked at number 22 on the Billboard Global 200, number 84 on the Billboard Hot 100, and number 152 on South Korea's Circle Digital Chart. It also became a top-ten charting song in Hungary, Japan, and Taiwan.

== Background and release ==
On December 21, 2022, Twice posted a poster showing the text "Twice / Our Youth" with the caption "First, 1/4 of 2023", revealing that they would release the second all-English single in January 2023, their first since "The Feels" in 2021, and their twelfth extended play in March of the same year. On January 3, 2023, Twice shared their new English single title on their social media account, called "Moonlight Sunrise", to be released on January 20. Individual and group concept photos were posted between January 10 and 15. The music video teaser was released through Twice's YouTube account on January 17. They performed the song for the first time at the 2023 Billboard Women in Music event held in Los Angeles on March 1.

== Composition ==
"Moonlight Sunrise" was co-produced by Earattack and Lee Woo-hyun, and co-written by Nina Ann Nelson and Kaedi Dalley of Citizen Queen. It is an upbeat Miami bass, R&B, and pop song. The track incorporates a synth-pop arrangement with house influences, a dreamy melody, and lyrics that "explore the urgency of love" In terms of musical notation, the song is written in the key of C-sharp major and has a tempo of 125 beats per minute.

In an interview with People, Jihyo said the inspiration for the song came from the final concert of Twice 4th World Tour III at Banc of California Stadium: "During the tour, we had performed under the moonlight and we were dancing, and the composer for this song was there. He found our performance so beautiful, so that was what the inspiration of this song." Tzuyu shared the meaning of "Moonlight Sunrise" during an appearance on The Kelly Clarkson Show, explaining that the song is about "wanting to know the other person's heart, and they use the metaphor of 'moonlight' and 'sunrise' to parallel that fluttering heart feeling when you're in love."

== Critical reception ==
Professional ratings
Review scores
Source	Rating
IZM	3/5 stars
NME	3/5 stars

Rolling Stone India reviewed the song and stated that "it exudes romance with a synth-pop arrangement, further intensified with house influences. The dreamy melody breathes life into the lyrics that explore the urgency of love. The dizzying love confession sees the members of Twice boldly confess their ardor; 'Baby, I don't really mean to rush/ But I'ma really need your touch/ If I'ma make it through the night/ I got the moonlight/ Tequila sunrise/ Uh, come take a shot on me, I got ya'". Joshua Minsoo Kim, writing for NPR Music, said the song was "one of the most thrilling English songs from a K-pop group ever" and praised its "faithful interpretation" of the Atlanta bass genre. Tim Chan writing for Rolling Stone stated that "'Moonlight Sunrise,' a serious contender for pop song of the year. No longer the wide-eyed group that burst onto the scene as teenagers in 2015, Twice get downright sultry and seductive on the Atlanta bass-inspired track. In just three minutes, 'Moonlight' perfectly encapsulates the sheer joy of Twice's music, brimming with sing-along melodies and playful lyrics that get people talking". Lai Frances, writing for Uproxx, "the song's flirtatious lyrics ('I've got the moonlight, tequila sunrise, come take a shot on me, I got ya') on top of a bed of Miami-bass is an invitation to the new side of Twice." Rolling Stone included the song in their list of best song of 2023, praising the group's change in sound and image writing, "Twice underscored their maturity by showing an artistic range beyond their signature bubblegum pop, with a Miami bass-infused R&B track."

== Commercial performance ==
"Moonlight Sunrise" marks the group's second entry on the Billboard Hot 100, making Twice the fourth K-pop group to have two or more songs on the chart, joining BTS, Blackpink, and New Jeans.

== Track listing ==
- Remixes EP
1. "Moonlight Sunrise" – 3:00
2. "Moonlight Sunrise" (House remix) – 3:38
3. "Moonlight Sunrise" (Club remix) – 3:51
4. "Moonlight Sunrise" (R&B remix) – 3:13
5. "Moonlight Sunrise" (instrumental) – 3:00

== Credits and personnel ==
- Twice – vocals
- Sophia Pae – background vocals
- Earattack – songwriter, producer, arranger, keyboard, bass, drum programming, vocal director, recording
- Nina Ann Nelson – songwriter
- Kaedi Dalley – songwriter
- Lee Woo-hyun – songwriter, producer, arranger, keyboard, bass, drum programming
- Lee Kyeong-won – digital editing
- Goo Hye-jin – recording
- Lim Chan-mi – recording
- Lee Tae-sub – mixing
- Kwon Nam-woo – mastering
- Haneul Lee – immersive mix engineering
- Jung-hoon Choi – immersive mix engineering

== Charts ==
Chart performance for "Moonlight Sunrise"
Chart (2023)	Peak position
Australia Digital Tracks (ARIA)	36
Canada Hot 100 (Billboard)	62
Global 200 (Billboard)	22
Hong Kong (Billboard)	22
Hungary (Single Top 40)	6
Japan Hot 100 (Billboard)	5
Japan Combined Singles (Oricon)	7
Malaysia (Billboard)	19
New Zealand Hot Singles (RMNZ)	4
Philippines (Billboard)	11
Singapore (RIAS)	11
South Korea (Circle)	152
Taiwan (Billboard)	6
UK Indie (OCC)	31
UK Singles Downloads (OCC)	39
UK Singles Sales (OCC)	39
US Billboard Hot 100	84
Vietnam (Vietnam Hot 100)	27

== Certifications ==
Streaming certifications for "Moonlight Sunrise"
Region	Certification	Certified units/sales
Japan (RIAJ)	Platinum	100,000,000^{†}
^{†} Streaming-only figures based on certification alone.

== Release history ==
Release dates and formats for "Moonlight Sunrise"
Region	Date	Format(s)	Version	Label	Ref.
Various	January 20, 2023	Digital download; streaming	Original	JYP; Republic	
Various	January 24, 2023	Digital download; streaming	The Remixes	JYP; Republic	
Various	November 17, 2023	Digital download; streaming	Jonas Blue remix	JYP; Republic	
