= Scientist (song) =

2021 song by Twice

Single by Twice

from the album Formula of Love: O+T=<3
- Language: Korean
- Released: November 12, 2021
- Studio: JYPE Studios (Seoul)
- Genre: Dance-pop; deep house
- Length: 3:14
- Label: JYP; Republic
- Composers: Anne-Marie; Melanie Fontana; Michel "Lindgren" Schulz; Tommy Brown; Steven Franks; 72
- Lyricist: Sim Eun-jee
- Producers: Tommy Brown; Steven Franks; Michel "Lindgren" Schulz

Twice singles chronology
"The Feels" (2021)	"Scientist" (2021)	"Doughnut" (2021)

Music video
- "Scientist" on YouTube

"Scientist" is a song recorded by South Korean girl group Twice. It was released on November 12, 2021, by JYP Entertainment and Republic Records as the second single of the group's third Korean and overall sixth studio album, Formula of Love: O+T=<3 (2021).

"Scientist" peaked at number 52 on the Billboard Global 200 and number 32 on South Korea's Circle Digital Chart.

== Background and release ==
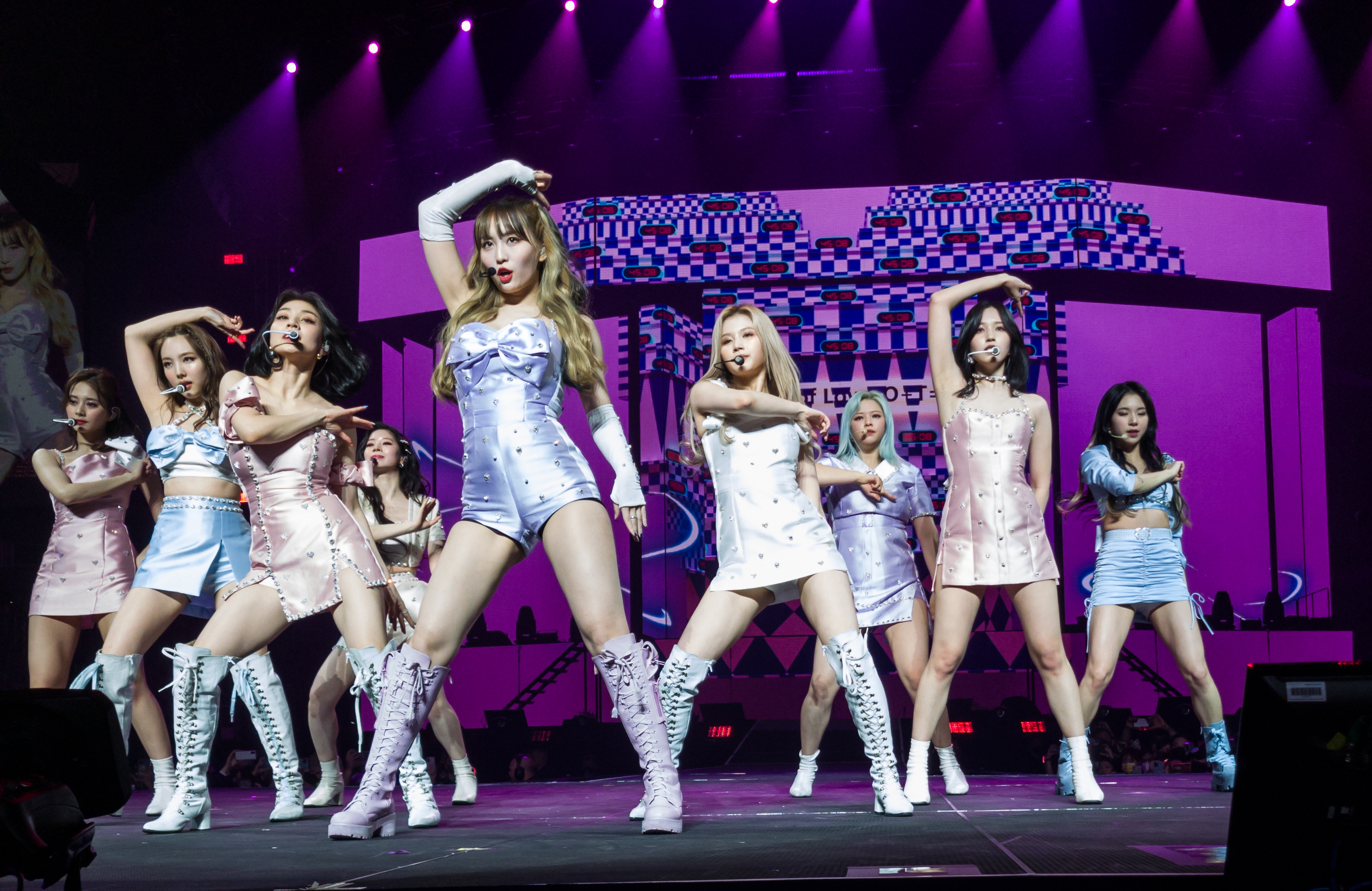
Twice performing "Scientist" at the Dickies Arena in Fort Worth, Texas on February 22, 2022

On October 1, 2021, Twice released their first English single, "The Feels". At the end of the song's music video, an upcoming full-length album and tour were teased. On October 24, JYP Entertainment released a trailer featuring Twice members dressed up as scientists at the "Twice Love Lab", a laboratory where they conduct "love experiments". On November 5, a snippet of the song was uploaded to Twice's TikTok account.

The Japanese version of "Scientist" was released as a digital single on March 2, 2022, ahead of Twice's fourth compilation album #Twice4. The Japanese lyrics were written by Yuki Kokubo.

== Composition ==
"Scientist" has its lyrics written by Sim Eun-jee and music composed by Anne-Marie, Melanie Fontana, Michel "Lindgren" Schulz, Tommy Brown, Steven Franks, and 72. The song has been described as a blend of deep house and dance-pop with 80s synth beats. Lyrically, it expresses that "love is not something you can calculate, study and try to find an answer to but is something you should follow with your heart". Running for more than 3 minutes, the song is composed in the key of F♯ mixolydian and has a tempo of 113 beats per minute.

== Critical reception and accolades ==
Bailey Kanthatham of the New University acknowledged the song's "innocent approach to love", contrasting it with Twice's most recent singles, "Alcohol-Free", "Perfect World", and "The Feels". It was ranked amongst the best K-pop Songs of the year by Billboard (19th), Dazed (9th), and Paper (9th).

"Scientist" received two music program awards on Music Bank on November 19 and Inkigayo on November 28, 2021. It won the Artist of the Year – Digital Music (November) award at the 11th Gaon Chart Music Awards.

== Music video and promotion ==
"Scientist" was released on November 12 with an accompanying music video. Directed and produced by Rima Yoon and Dongju Jang of Rigend Film – who previously worked with Twice on Formula of Love: O+T=<3's album trailer and "Alcohol-Free"'s music video – the music video is primarily set in a laboratory where the members of Twice are depicted as scientists researching about love. Its dance was choreographed by La Chica, a dance trio who have worked with Aespa, BoA, Chungha, and CLC.

JYP Entertainment released several concept photos and video teasers to promote Formula of Love: O+T=<3 and "Scientist". Twice performed "Scientist" on several music shows in South Korea, including KBS2's Music Bank, MBC's Show! Music Core, and SBS's Inkigayo. In the United States, the group appeared on the MTV news show Fresh Out Live on November 13 with a performance of "Scientist".

== Credits and personnel ==
Credits adapted from Twice's official website.

=== Recording ===
- Recorded at JYPE Studios (Seoul, South Korea)
- Mixed at JYPE Studios (Seoul, South Korea)
- Mastered at 821 Sound Mastering (South Korea)

=== Personnel ===
- Twice – vocals
- 72 – composer
- Anne-Marie – composer
- Kwon Nam-woo – masterer
- Lee Tae-seop – mixer
- Melanie Fontana – composer, background vocals
- Michel "Lindgren" Schulz – composer, producer
- Tommy Brown – composer, producer
- Sim Eun-jee – lyricist, vocal director
- Sophia Pae – background vocals
- Steven Franks – composer, producer

== Charts ==
=== Weekly charts ===
Weekly chart performance for "Scientist"
Chart (2021)	Peak position
Global 200 (Billboard)	52
Japan Hot 100 (Billboard)	25
Japan Combined Singles (Oricon)	24
Netherlands (Dutch Global Top 40)	23
New Zealand Hot Singles (RMNZ)	27
Singapore (RIAS)	16
South Korea (Gaon)	32
South Korea (K-pop Hot 100)	19
US World Digital Song Sales (Billboard)	7

=== Monthly charts ===
Monthly chart performance for "Scientist"
Chart (2021)	Peak position
South Korea (Gaon)	53
South Korea (K-pop Hot 100)	23

== Certifications ==
Streaming certifications for "Scientist"
Region	Certification	Certified units/sales
Japan (RIAJ)	Gold	50,000,000^{†}
^{†} Streaming-only figures based on certification alone.

== See also ==
- List of Inkigayo Chart winners (2021)
- List of Music Bank Chart winners (2021)
