= Formula of Love: O+T=＜3 =

Formula of Love: O+T=<3
- Digital cover

Studio album by Twice
- Released: November 12, 2021
- Studio: JYPE Studios (Seoul)
- Genres: Disco-pop; synth-pop
- Length: 48:31
- Languages: Korean; English
- Labels: JYP; Republic

Twice chronology
Perfect World (2021)	Formula of Love: O+T=<3 (2021)	#Twice4 (2022)

Singles from Formula of Love: O+T=<3
- 1. "The Feels" Released: October 1, 2021; 2. "Scientist" Released: November 12, 2021

Formula of Love: O+T=<3 (Note: Read as "O plus T equals heart". For its definition, see § Title.) is the third Korean studio album (sixth overall) by South Korean girl group Twice. It was released on November 12, 2021, by JYP Entertainment and Republic Records. It consists of sixteen tracks, including the group's first English single, "The Feels", and lead single "Scientist". The album is primarily a disco-pop and synth-pop record that also incorporates other genres such as Latin pop, hip hop, and R&B.

Formula of Love: O+T=<3 received universal acclaim and was a commercial success. The album sold over 700,000 units during its pre-order period and became Twice's best-selling album to date, surpassing a record previously held by More & More (2020). It debuted at number three on the Billboard 200 with 66,000 album-equivalent units, becoming the group's fourth and highest entry on the chart.

== Background ==
Formula of Love: O+T=<3 is Twice's third Korean-language studio album, following Eyes Wide Open (2020). It was the group's third release in 2021, following their tenth Korean extended play, Taste of Love, and third Japanese album, Perfect World.

Formula of Love: O+T=<3 was first teased by Twice member Chaeyoung on September 13, 2021, in the behind-the-scenes video for her photoshoot with OhBoy! magazine. At the end of the music video of Twice's first English single, "The Feels", a full-length album scheduled to be released in November 2021 was teased. The name of the album and its release date was revealed on October 8. A preview showing the four versions (Note: Study About Love, Break It, Explosion, and Full of Love.) of the physical album was posted on October 12, and pre-orders began later that day. On October 29, the album's track listing was announced.

== Composition ==
Formula of Love: O+T=<3 is a fifteen-track (Note: The digital edition of Formula of Love: O+T=<3 features 16 tracks. See § Track listing.) album that features genres such as dance-pop, soul-pop, synth-pop, disco-pop, hip-hop, trap and R&B that takes influence from city pop, deep house, disco, Latin pop, nu-disco, reggaeton, and pop rock. Twice members Nayeon, Jihyo, Dahyun, and Chaeyoung took part in writing some songs from the album. In addition to the members, a variety of notable Western and JYP in-house songwriter-producers also participated, including The Stereotypes, Melanie Fontana, Tommy Brown, Anne-Marie, Lee Woo-min "collapsedone," Sim Eun-jee, Sophia Pae, and Earattack.

=== Songs ===
Formula of Love: O+T=<3 opens with its lead single, "Scientist", a song blending elements of dance-pop and deep house, and featuring '80s-inspired synths with "groovy" bass lines in its production. Lyrically, it delves into the theme of love and studying the fundamentals of romance, and by using science-related word play, they declare there is no right answer to love. It is followed by English track "Moonlight", a disco-pop song that incorporates "funky" orchestration reminiscent of the 1980s. Ana Clara Ribeiro of PopMatters noted that the song's "drum pattern, bassline, marimba, and percussions resemble soul-pop classics of the 1980s, like DeBarge's 'Rhythm of the Night', or Lionel Richie's 'All Night Long'." Another English song, "Icon", is a "hard-hitting" and "sensual" synth-pop track with elements of reggae-pop. Lyrically, Mina said the song is about "expressing the iconic side of you without hesitation". Tanu I. Raj of NME noted that "the track carries the determination of 'Fancy' and the irreverence of 'Don't Call Me Again', wrapping them up neatly in the confidence of an act absolutely secure in their vision and position." In his review for Sputnikmusic, Raul Stanciu proclaimed "Icon" as the "most swag [track that] Twice can offer".

The fourth track "Cruel", written by Dahyun, is a fast-paced song with lyrics about "turning the tables on someone while still maintaining innocence". Raj compared it to Twice's song "Scandal" (Taste of Love), for having "the same calculated and dangerous allure". The fifth track, "Real You", written by Jihyo, is a disco-pop song characterized by a bouncy rhythm and "catchy" bass line on top of a "trendy" funky sound. Jihyo noted that the song is about "asking for truthfulness and sincerity from a person who is full of his/herself and doesn't realize what pure love is". The sixth track "F.I.L.A. (Fall In Love Again)", written by Nayeon, is a dance-pop and disco-pop track that explores the conflict of a relationship with no future.

The seventh track, "Last Waltz", is a Latin pop-inspired song that includes an interpolation of Tchaikovsky's "Waltz of the Flowers". It features an acoustic guitar riff on top of a trap-based rhythm and violins that "channel the feeling of classical music that the song title suggests". Momo explained the meaning behind the lyrics, saying "it is a sad story about wanting to make the day you break up with someone the best, perfect day. It's about two people wanting to make the sad ending happy." This is followed by R&B and hip-hop infused track "Espresso", built around a bass line, a heavy beat, and a whisper-like chorus. Lyrically, Twice compares their charm to espresso and the "coffee" in question can be interpreted with a sexual connotation.

The ninth track, "Rewind", is an R&B ballad with lo-fi sounds and swing rhythm. The song's lyrics are about heartbreak after a break up. The tenth track, "Cactus" (선인장), written and composed by Jihyo, is a ballad that incorporates pop-rock elements. In an interview with the Associated Press, Jihyo revealed that the death of a houseplant was her inspiration for writing the song, and it was written from the plant's perspective, "seeing its owner walking in and out of the room and ignoring it". She also noted that the song is about "the feeling of uneasiness from the uncertain future of a relationship".

The eleventh track, "Push & Pull" is the first of three sub-unit tracks, and is performed by Jihyo, Sana, and Dahyun. The song's genre was variously described as city pop-inspired, dance-pop and future funk, and disco-pop, accompanied by elements of 1980s soul and hip-hop. It features some of Twice's "melodic trademarks", such as their "cute rap" in the post-chorus. The song's lyrics are about playful pushing and pulling in a relationship "to bring the other person closer". "Hello", a trap song performed by Nayeon, Momo, and Chaeyoung, has lyrics devoted to Twice's "powerful and cool appearance onstage". "1, 3, 2", performed by Jeongyeon, Mina, and Tzuyu is a medium-tempo reggae-pop song. Lyrically, "it tells a story of a relationship that is going bad due to the mismatching tempos between the two people". The closing track, "Candy", is a pop song dedicated to Twice's fanbase, Once.

== Title ==
The album's title, Formula of Love: O+T=<3, has two meanings according to Twice. The letters O and T represent the initials of Once—the group's official fandom's name—and Twice, respectively, while the heart symbol (<3) represents love; thus, the "formula of love" can be verbalized as "Once plus Twice equals love". The letters O and T also represent the initials of numbers 1 (one) and 2 (two), respectively, while the number 3 in the heart symbol (<3) represents the position of Formula of Love: O+T=<3 in Twice's Korean albums chronology.

== Release and promotion ==
On October 20, 2021, during the group's sixth anniversary week, Twice held a livestreaming event titled H6me Party with 6nce, where they sang "Candy", an English song from the album dedicated to their fans. On October 24, JYP Entertainment released a mockumentary-style trailer featuring Twice members dressed up as scientists at the "Twice Love Lab". Twice released several concept photos to promote the album and its lead single, "Scientist". In addition to these, teasers for the music video of "Scientist" were released days ahead of its release. Hours before the official release of Formula of Love: O+T=<3, the group went live on YouTube and V Live to discuss the making-of the album.

== Critical reception ==
Professional ratings
Aggregate scores
Source	Rating
Metacritic	88/100
Review scores
Source	Rating
AllMusic	4/5 stars
Beats Per Minute	82%
NME	5/5 stars
PopMatters	8/10
Sputnikmusic	3.8/5

Formula of Love: O+T=<3 received widespread acclaim from music critics who complimented its cohesiveness, consistency, and diversity. On Metacritic, which assigns a normalized rating out of 100 to reviews from professional publications, it received a mean score of 88 based on 5 reviews, indicating "universal acclaim"; it is one of the highest-rated K-pop albums on the website.

Writing for Sputnikmusic, Raul Stanciu gave Formula of Love: O+T=<3 a 3.8 out of 5 rating, praising Twice and the album's producers for presenting a "cohesive record", but stressed that it "could have been trimmed to 10 strong cuts". Stanciu also addressed the album's "slight drop in quality" in its second half. Tanu I. Raj of NME gave the album a five-star rating, citing it as a "masterful win befitting [Twice's] global expansion". Raj added that the group's "absolute and unapologetic embracing of their concept has led them to the point where they can subvert it and still be considered credible". South China Morning Post's Tamar Herman noted that "throughout it all, [the album] is a groovy, bouncy addition that feels true to the group while still trying new things." For Beats Per Minute, Chase McMullen rated the album 82 out of 100, applauding Twice's "ability to crank out pop bliss with nearly superhuman speed" and the album's "irresistible eclecticism on display, with each and every track serving as a unique adventure into some different corner." PopMatters critic Ana Clara Ribeiro wrote that the album is a proof for "anyone who ever thought of Twice as one-dimensional or that their 'cute' brand would limit them." AllMusic's David Crone concluded his review by saying the album is Twice's best release to date and that it "surpasses expectations, infusing the group's love-centric lyricism with newfound confidence and creative flair." Rolling Stone Korea called Formula of Love: O+T=<3 "the pinnacle of Twice's career history" and considered it as one of K-pop's best album of 2021. Idology also said it was Twice's best album to date, and noted that the group's attempts to move beyond bubblegum pop, noticeable since Feel Special (2019), had finally borne fruit.

=== Year-end lists ===
Formula of Love: O+T=<3 on year-end lists
Critic/Publication	List	Rank	Ref.
Beats Per Minute	Top 50 Albums of 2021	48	
Idology	Top 10 Albums of 2021	Placed	
Nylon	10 Best K-pop Albums of 2021	Placed	
Omelete	15 Best K-pop Albums of the Year	9	
PopMatters	Top 20 Best K-pop Albums of 2021	5	
South China Morning Post	25 Best K-pop Albums of 2021	7	
Time	Best K-pop Songs and Albums of 2021	Placed	

== Commercial performance ==
On November 10, 2021, it was reported that Formula of Love: O+T=<3 had gained over 630,000 pre-order sales by November 8, becoming Twice's most pre-ordered and best-selling album of all time before its release. By November 10, it had reached over 700,000 pre-order sales. In its first week, MRC Data reported that the album had sold 66,000 album-equivalent units in the United States. Of these, 58,000 were pure sales, 8,000 were streaming-equivalent units, and a negligible number were track-equivalent units. On May 12, 2022, the Korea Music Content Association (KMCA) certified the album 3× Platinum after it sold more than 750,000 units.

Formula of Love: O+T=<3 debuted at number 1 on South Korea's Gaon Album Chart, making it Twice's tenth number-one album on the chart, following More & More (2020). In Japan, it peaked at number 17 on Billboard Japan's Hot Albums chart and at number 2 on Oricon's Albums Chart. The album became Twice's highest-charting album in the US and Canada to date, peaking at numbers 3 and 17 on the Billboard 200 and the Canadian Albums Chart, respectively. In addition to this feat, the album spent 8 consecutive weeks on the Billboard 200. Moreover, on other Billboard charts, the album peaked at numbers 7, 2, and 1 on Tastemakers, Top Album Sales, and World Albums, respectively. In Europe, the album appeared on Belgium's Ultratop Flanders and Wallonia 200 Albums, Finland's Top 50 Albums, Lithuania's Top 100 Albums, the Netherlands' Album Top 100, and the United Kingdom's Album Downloads Chart.

== Track listing ==
Track listing for Formula of Love: O+T=<3
No.	Title	Lyrics	Music	Arrangement	Length
1.	"Scientist"	Sim Eun-jee	Anne-Marie; Melanie Fontana; Michel "Lindgren" Schulz; Tommy Brown; Steven Franks; 72	Brown; Franks; Lindgren	3:14
2.	"Moonlight"	Michael Pollack; Jake Torrey; Destiny Rogers	Jonathan Yip; Ray Romulus; Jeremy Reeves; Ray Charles McCullough II	The Stereotypes	3:39
3.	"Icon"	Melanie Fontana; GG Ramirez	Fontana; Lindgren; Ramirez	Lindgren	2:56
4.	"Cruel"	Dahyun	Cutfather; Jeppe London Bilsby; Brooke Tomlinson; Alma Gudmundsdottir; Lauritz Emil Christiansen	Cutfather; Bilsby; Christiansen	3:31
5.	"Real You"	Jihyo	Earattack; Sophia Pae; Gongdo; Master Key	Earattack; Gongdo	3:07
6.	"F.I.L.A. (Fall in Love Again)"	Nayeon	Anne Judith Stokke Wik; Sonny J Mason; Karen Poole; Ronny Svendsen	Stokke Wik; Mason; Poole; Svendsen	3:11
7.	"Last Waltz"	Sim Eun-jee	Sim; Lee Hae-sol; Ejae	Lee	2:50
8.	"Espresso"	MosPick; Young Chance	MosPick; Young Chance	MosPick	3:07
9.	"Rewind" (알고 싶지 않아; Algo sipji ana; 'I Don't Want to Know')	Jeong Ho-hyun (e.one)	Jeong	Jeong	3:00
10.	"Cactus" (선인장; Seoninjang)	Jihyo	Jihyo; Coke Paris	Coke Paris	3:37
11.	"Push & Pull" (Jihyo, Sana, Dahyun)	Lee Seu-ran	Justin Reinstein; Anna Timgren	Reinstein	3:25
12.	"Hello" (Nayeon, Momo, Chaeyoung)	Jed; Luke; Davidior	Davidior; Jed	Davidior	3:03
13.	"1, 3, 2" (Jeongyeon, Mina, Tzuyu)	Sim Eun-jee	Marcus Van Wattum; Jenson Vaughan; Lauren Dyson; Alexander Pavelich	Van Wattum; Vaughan; Dyson; Pavelich	3:18
14.	"Candy"	Lewis Shay "Shift K3Y" Jankel	Shift K3Y	Shift K3Y	3:15

Physical edition only
No.	Title	Lyrics	Music	Arrangement	Length
15.	"The Feels" (Korean version)	Chaeyoung; Lee Woo-min "collapsedone"; Reinstein; Timgren; Boy Matthews	collapsedone; Reinstein; Timgren	collapsedone; Reinstein	3:18
Total length:					48:31

Digital edition only
No.	Title	Lyrics	Music	Arrangement	Length
15.	"The Feels"	collapsedone; Reinstein; Timgren; Matthews	collapsedone; Reinstein; Timgren	collapsedone; Reinstein	3:18
16.	"Scientist" (R3hab remix)	Sim Eun-jee	Anne-Marie; Fontana; Lindgren; Brown; Franks; 72	Brown; Franks; Lindgren; R3hab	3:28
Total length:					51:59

Result File version
No.	Title	Lyrics	Music	Arrangement	Length
15.	"The Feels" (Korean version)	Chaeyoung; collapsedone; Reinstein; Timgren; Matthews	collapsedone; Reinstein; Timgren	collapsedone; Reinstein	3:18
16.	"The Feels"	collapsedone; Reinstein; Timgren; Matthews	collapsedone; Reinstein; Timgren	collapsedone; Reinstein	3:18
Total length:					51:49

== Personnel ==
Credits adapted from Melon and album liner notes.

=== Studios ===
- JYPE Studios – recording (All tracks), mixing (Tracks 1, 3–6, 11, 13)
- Beach Wave Sound – mixing (Tracks 2)
- Klang Studio – mixing (Tracks 7, 12, 14)
- Joe Lab – mixing (Tracks 8–9)
- Glab Studios – mixing (Track 10)
- 821 Sound – mastering (All tracks)

=== Musicians ===
- Twice – vocals (all tracks)
  - Chaeyoung – background vocals (track 12)
  - Momo – background vocals (track 12)
  - Nayeon – background vocals (track 12)
- Choi Joon-yeong – bass (track 10)
- Ejae – background vocals (track 7)
- Melanie Fontana – background vocals (tracks 1, 3, 17)
- Jeong Ho-hyun – keyboard, background vocals (track 9)
- Kang Dong-ha – piano (track 8)
- Kim Jong-sung – guitar (track 5)
- Kim Myeong-gwan – guitar (track 10)
- Kim So-hyun – background vocals (track 9)
- Sound Kim – background vocals (track 8)
- Lee Eun-seong – chorus vocals (track 10)
- Lee Hae-sol – instrumentation, keyboard, synthesizer (track 7)
- Lee Woo-min "collapsedone" – bass, guitar, instrumentation, synthesizer (tracks 15–16)
- Sonny J Mason – producer (track 6)
- No Hui-chang (Coke Paris) – guitar, MIDI programmer, piano (track 10)
- Sophia Pae – background vocals (tracks 1–6, 11, 13–17)
- Park Woo-jeong – guitar (track 8)
- Justin Reinstein – instrumentation (track 11), synthesizer (tracks 15–16)
- Michel "Lindgren" Schulz – vocal producer (tracks 1, 17)
- Ronny Svendsen – producer (track 6)
- Anna Timgren – background vocals (tracks 15–16)
- Young Chance – electric piano (track 8)

=== Technical ===
- Choi Hye-jin – recording (tracks 8, 12)
- Kevin "KD" Davis – mixing (track 2)
- earattack – vocal director (track 12)
- Eom Se-hee – recording (tracks 1–10, 13–17)
- Gene Grimaldi – mastering (track 2)
- John Hanes – immersive mixing (track 16)
- Im Hong-jin – mixing (track 4, 13)
- Jeong Yu-ra – digital editing (tracks 5, 12)
- Kang Dong-ho – assistant mixing (tracks 8–9)
- Koo Jong-pil – mixing (tracks 7, 12, 14)
- Koo Hye-jin – recording (tracks 1–2, 5, 7, 9–11, 14, 17)
- Kwon Nam-woo – mastering (tracks 1, 3–16)
- Lee Sang-yeop – recording (tracks 3–4, 6, 14–16)
- Lee Tae-seop – mixing (tracks 1, 3, 5)
- Lee Woo-min "collapsedone" – programmer, vocal director, vocal editing (tracks 15–16)
- Tony Maserati – mixing (tracks 15–16)
- No Hui-chang (Coke Paris) – vocal editing (track 10)
- Sophia Pae – vocal director (tracks 2–4, 6, 14–17)
- Park Eun-jeong – mixing (tracks 6, 11)
- Justin Reinstein – programmer (tracks 11, 15–16)
- Shin Bong-won – mixing (track 11)
- Jiyoung Shin NYC – additional editing (tracks 2–4, 6, 11, 14), digital editing (track 13)
- Sim Eun-jee – digital editing, vocal director (tracks 1, 7, 13, 17)
- Uncle Joe (조씨아저씨) – mixing (tracks 8–9)
- David K. Younghyun – assistant mixing (tracks 15–16)

== Charts ==
=== Weekly charts ===
Weekly chart performance
Chart (2021–2022)	Peak position
Belgian Albums (Ultratop Flanders)	64
Belgian Albums (Ultratop Wallonia)	132
Canadian Albums (Billboard)	17
Croatian International Albums (HDU)	16
Dutch Albums (Album Top 100)	77
Finnish Albums (Suomen virallinen lista)	10
Hungarian Albums (MAHASZ)	21
Japanese Albums (Oricon)	2
Japanese Hot Albums (Billboard Japan)	17
Lithuanian Albums (AGATA)	100
South Korean Albums (Gaon)	1
UK Album Downloads (Official Charts)	39
US Billboard 200	3
US Indie Store Album Sales (Billboard)	7
US World Albums (Billboard)	1

Weekly chart performance (Result File version)
Chart (2021)	Peak position
South Korean Albums (Gaon)	2

=== Monthly charts ===
Monthly chart performance
Chart (2021)	Peak position
South Korean Albums (Gaon)	2

=== Year-end charts ===
Year-end chart performance
Chart (2021)	Position
Japanese Albums (Oricon)	80
South Korean Albums (Gaon)	19

== Certifications and sales ==
Certifications
Region	Certification	Certified units/sales
Japan	—	68,975
South Korea (KMCA)	3× Platinum	894,416
United States	—	58,000

== Release history ==
Release dates and formats
Region	Date	Format(s)	Label	Ref.
Various	November 12, 2021	CD; digital download; streaming	JYP; Republic	
United States	November 12, 2021	CD (Target exclusive)	JYP; Republic	
South Korea	December 17, 2021	CD (Result File version)	JYP	

== See also ==
- List of certified albums in South Korea
- List of Gaon Album Chart number ones of 2021
- List of K-pop albums on the Billboard charts
