= Citizen Queen =

American girl group

- Origin: Los Angeles, California, U.S.
- Genres: Pop; R&B; a cappella
- Years active: 2018–present
- Label: RCA Records
- Members: Kaedi Dalley; Cora Isabel; Nina Ann Nelson
- Past members: Hannah Mrozak; Kaylah Sharve'
- Website: citizenqueen.com

Citizen Queen is an American girl group formed in 2018 under the auspices of RCA Records, with mentorship from Pentatonix member Scott Hoying. Originally a five-member group, Citizen Queen consists of vocalists Kaedi Dalley, Cora Isabel, and Nina Ann Nelson.

== Members ==
- Cora Isabel (Beatboxer/Alto) (born February 24, 2001)
- Kaedi Dalley (Contralto) (born December 2, 2000)
- Nina Ann Nelson (Soprano) (born March 25, 1998)

=== Former members ===
- Hannah Mrozak (Mezzo-soprano) (born July 27, 1998) Mrozak announced her departure on social media in May 2022. The group then announced that it would continue as a quartet, and thereafter released new material as a quartet.
- Kaylah Sharve' (Alto) (born January 6, 1999) On May 4, 2024, Sharve' announced her departure on the group's Instagram page. The rest of the group confirmed they will continue as a trio.

== Formation ==
Pentatonix member Scott Hoying, along with arrangers and producers Ben Bram and Shams Ahmed, "hand-selected" the original five members of the group. The members of the band "come from different states and different ethnic backgrounds".

Singer and beatboxer Cora Isabel was the first member chosen, after sending audition videos to the arrangers. Bram first saw Hannah Mrozak on season 13 of The Voice "where she made it to the playoffs in 2017 as a member of Adam Levine's and Jennifer Hudson's teams". Bram "reached out to Mrozak" and "encouraged her to audition" for Citizen Queen. The members of the group were "complete strangers before the group's founding", except for SoCal VoCals members Nelson and Sharve'. Bram had been music director of the SoCal VoCals before participating in the formation of Pentatonix and Citizen Queen. Sharve' had also previously released an album and performed in her home state of Texas.

The group has been identified as playing a part in the revival of girl groups in the United States. Refinery29 stated that the group "kicks down the doors with their powerful official debut, and the perfectly placed harmonies, bass, and vocal percussion on the original song all but promise a top spot for the talented newbies. Forget what you heard — girl groups ain't dead, y'all". Nylon described the group as "Modern representation plus Danity Kane-levels of pop ear-worminess? This is the girl group we deserve!" The group has been described as "unique because they tend to rely more on their voices rather than singing along to a beat". Cosmopolitan compared the group to Fifth Harmony, and their origin to the movie, Pitch Perfect, noting that "after going through a cappella boot camps and auditions, the girls joined forces to create pop anthems and covers". Fringe noted that the group had "received praise from the likes of everyone from Ariana Grande to Meghan Trainor".

== Song production and touring ==
The group reportedly first worked out of an Airbnb in Los Angeles, recording "four fully produced songs and music videos" in the course of a week. Their first popular video was "Evolution of Girl Groups", a six-minute medley of 25 songs, which was posted to YouTube in January 2019. It had received nearly 10 million views by June 2019, and over 18 million views by August 2020, passing 20 million views in December 2020.

In July 2019, the group opened for Pentatonix on a nine-week world tour, with the tour also featuring Rachel Platten. The group went on to record well-viewed videos for "No Tears Left to Cry" by Ariana Grande, "Lost in Japan" by Shawn Mendes, and "Never Enough" from The Greatest Showman. In June 2020, the group performed an arrangement of "Free Your Mind" by En Vogue for the 2020 Pride Benefit Concert put on by RCA Records and the Human Rights Campaign. In December 2020, the group released their first original song, "Call Me Queen", written by Justin Tranter, Nova Wav, and Shawn Wasabi, and accompanied by a music video produced by Lauren Dunn. The group also performed that month at TheWrap's 2020 Power Women Summit. In January 2021, the group released an official remix of "Call Me Queen" by Armada Music artist Frank Pole.

The group's next original song was "No Ego", written by Justin Tranter and songwriting duo Nova Wav and released in March 2021. In April 2021, the group released the original ballad, "Y", reported by the group to have been inspired by a bad breakup experienced by Mrozak. Shortly after the posting of a video on TikTok introducing the song, it was reported that the video had received "almost four million views and over nine thousand comments".

In June 2022, the group released their original single, “XO”, written by Nova Wav, Kiana Ledé, Amiyah “AJ” Brown, Nina Nelson, Kaedi Dalley, Kaylah Sharve', and Cora Isabel, and accompanied by a music video directed by Jadagrace. Two weeks later, they released another original, "Waste My Time", reviewed by Billboard as "effortlessly harmonizing and recalling the past eras of girl groups, with Dalley's impossibly rich tone on full display". In December 2022, Fifth Harmony member Dinah Jane released a collaboration with the group, that being a "holiday medley of Justin Bieber's "Mistletoe", Ariana Grande's "Santa Tell Me, and Fifth Harmony's "Can You See" from holiday film The Star".

Nelson and Dalley were also writers on the Twice song "Moonlight Sunrise", released in January 2023.

== Chart performance ==
In December 2020, Citizen Queen had three songs on the South African iTunes Pop 100, these being their covers of "No Tears Left to Cry" at #48, "Slow Burn" at #96, and "Lost in Japan" at #100.

In May 2021, the original song "Y" reached #48 on the Nigerian iTunes Pop 100.

== Discography ==
=== Extended plays ===
Title	Details
Clique	Released: September 15, 2023; Label: Self-released; Formats: Digital download, streaming

=== Singles ===
Title	Year	Album or EP
"Call Me Queen"	2020	Non-album singles
"No Ego"	2021	Non-album singles
"Y"	2021	Non-album singles
"XO"	2022	Clique
"Waste My Time"	2022	Clique
"Break Up"	2022	Clique
"So Special"	2023	Clique
"Whatchu Want"	2023	Clique
"Love the Way I Love You"	2024	Non-album singles
"Crush"	2025	Non-album singles

==== Covers ====
Year	Song	Original artist
2018	"No Tears Left to Cry"	Ariana Grande
2018	"This Christmas"	Donny Hathaway
2018	"Lost in Japan"	Shawn Mendes
2019	"Evolution of Girl Groups"	Various Artists
2019	"Never Enough"	The Greatest Showman OST
2019	"Best Part"	Daniel Caesar feat. H.E.R.
2019	"Good as Hell"	Lizzo
2019	"Señorita"	Shawn Mendes and Camila Cabello
2019	"Bad Guy"	Billie Eilish
2020	"Whack World Medley"	Tierra Whack
2020	"Slow Burn"	Kacey Musgraves
2020	"Free Your Mind"	En Vogue
2020	"Everybody Business"	Kehlani
2022	"Killing Me Softly with His Song"	Lori Lieberman
2022	"Don't Call Me Angel"	Ariana Grande, Lana Del Rey and Miley Cyrus

== Music videos ==
Title	Year	Director(s)
"Call Me Queen"	2020	Lauren Dunn
"No Ego"	2021	Ethan Lader
"Y"	2021	Ethan Lader
"XO"	2022	Jadagrace
"Waste My Time"	2022	Jadagrace
"Break Up"	2022	Jadagrace
"So Special"	2023	Lindsey Blaufarb & Craig Hollamon
"Whatchu Want"	2023	Lindsey Blaufarb & Craig Hollamon
"Love the Way I Love You"	2024	Shams Ahmed, Scott Hoying & Mark Hoying
"Crush"	2025	Lindsey Blaufarb & Craig Hollamon

== Tours ==
=== Opening Act ===
- Pentatonix: The World Tour (2019–2022)

== Awards and nominations ==
Award ceremony	Year	Category	Nominee(s)/work(s)	Result	Ref.
Contemporary A Cappella Recording Awards	2019	Best Holiday Song	"This Christmas"	Nominated	
Contemporary A Cappella Recording Awards	2019	Best Pop Song	"No Tears Left to Cry"	Runner-up	
