= The Feels (song) =

2021 song by Twice

Single by Twice

from the album Formula of Love: O+T=<3
- Released: October 1, 2021
- Studio: JYPE (Seoul)
- Genre: Disco; pop
- Length: 3:18
- Label: JYP; Republic
- Songwriters: Anna Timgren; Boy Matthews; Justin Reinstein; Woo Min Lee "Collapsedone"
- Producers: Collapsedone; Justin Reinstein

Twice singles chronology
"Perfect World" (2021)	"The Feels" (2021)	"Scientist" (2021)

Twice English singles chronology
"The Feels" (2021)	"Moonlight Sunrise" (2023)

Music video
- "The Feels" on YouTube

"The Feels" is a song by South Korean girl group Twice from their third Korean studio album, Formula of Love: O+T=＜3 (2021). The song was co-written and produced by the group's longtime collaborator Woo Min Lee "Collapsedone". It was released on October 1, 2021, through JYP Entertainment and Republic Records as the group's first original English single for the album. (Note: For other English-language songs by Twice, see § Background.) A disco-pop song that incorporates elements of groovy bass sounds and disco synth beats, its lyrics are about the protagonist's feeling of happiness after falling in love at first sight.

"The Feels" received acclaim from music critics, who praised its fun lyrics and production. The song was included in 2022 year-end best-of lists by the likes of Insider, Rolling Stone and Pitchfork. It peaked at number 94 on South Korea's Circle Digital Chart, number 12 on the Billboard Global 200, number 83 on the US Billboard Hot 100, and charted at the top 10 in Japan, Malaysia, Singapore, and on Spain Digital Song Sales. In 2022, the song was certified gold by the Recording Industry Association of America. In Japan, it was certified double platinum by the Recording Industry Association of Japan.

An accompanying music video was uploaded to YouTube simultaneously with the single's release. The video features a retro prom theme, with the girls receiving an invitation, getting ready, and performing at the prom. It was praised for its production quality and storyline and was nominated for Best K-Pop at the 2022 MTV Video Music Awards. To promote the song, the group performed on American talk shows like The Tonight Show Starring Jimmy Fallon, GMA3: What You Need to Know, and The Late Show with Stephen Colbert.

== Background ==
Prior to the release of "The Feels", Twice has released songs recorded in English, including the English versions of "I Can't Stop Me", "More & More", and "Cry for Me". On June 15, 2018, they released a cover of the Jackson 5's 1969 single "I Want You Back". It was released as a digital single and recorded in its original English lyrics. The cover later appeared on the group's first Japanese album, BDZ, as the tenth and final track. On November 20, 2019, they released their second Japanese album, &Twice, which features the group's first original English-language track, "What You Waiting For".

Following the release of their tenth EP, Taste of Love, Twice announced on June 25, 2021, that their first official English single will be released on a Friday in September. The single's title was not revealed until August 6, when they posted a photo teaser showing someone holding a letter. On August 23, 2021, JYP Entertainment announced October 1 to be the release date of "The Feels" through an 11-second videoclip. After the release, the group shared their excitement in exclusive interviews. Bollywood Hungama noted how happy they were to reconnect with fans shortly after their last release, Taste of Love. In another interview with Bustle, the group talked about their wish to connect with their U.S. fans, whom they hadn't seen since their Twicelights World Tour (2019–2020) due to the COVID-19 lockdowns. Nayeon mentioned that they wanted to communicate better with these fans.

== Music and lyrics ==
"The Feels"
An 18-second sample of the intro part of "The Feels", a fast-tempo disco-pop song.

Musically, "The Feels" is a fast-tempo 90s disco-pop track that consists of groovy bass sound and synth percussions. Driven by a rolling funk bass and drums, the song evokes a jubilant disco vibe. Atwood Magazine noted its saccharine production, which gives the track a hint of hyperpop quality. NME highlighted the song's blend of the group's signature bright, bubbly energy with a more mature edge. The review noted the song's vibrant production, joyous handclaps, shining synths, and syncopated rhythms. In terms of musical notation, it is composed in the key of B minor (while borrowing from the parallel Dorian mode) with a tempo of 120 beats per minute.

We’ve been developing ‘The Feels’ thinking of how we can bring back the essential nature of Twice’s bright energy. I kept on brainstorming ways to perform ‘The Feels’ in Twice’s truthful nature so that the song can capture our one and only bright energy, nature, and gestures.

— Nayeon talking about the inspiration behind "The Feels" via, Bollywood Hungama

The track aim to captures the excitement of falling in love with infectious refrains and self-assured delivery. In an interview with Bustle, group member Chaeyoung explained the song's message, saying, "The song is about falling in love at first sight and how we should stay true to our feelings when we're struck with love." Member Momo referred to "The Feels" as a bold introduction to a new chapter in their career. Chaeyoung mentioned that the song is not only highly addictive with its great hooks but also reveals who they are, showcasing their colors and style. They also noted that it is a mixture of two of their previous songs, "Like Ooh-Ahh" (2015) and "Cheer Up" (2016).

== Release and promotion ==
The first set of concept photos for "The Feels" was uploaded on September 3, 2021, announcing the release date of October 1, 2021. Twice held a question and answer event on Twitter on the day of the single's release. Jeongyeon, who went on hiatus due to panic and anxiety disorder, was not able to join the group during the song's promotion. Twice appeared on The Tonight Show Starring Jimmy Fallon, GMA3: What You Need to Know, and The Late Show with Stephen Colbert with performances of "The Feels". A Korean version of the song served as the fifteenth track for the physical edition of Formula of Love: O+T=<3, Twice's third Korean studio album. The Korean lyrics were written by Chaeyoung.

== Reception ==
"The Feels" was met with generally positive reviews from music critics. Rhian Daly of NME gave it a five-star rating, describing the song as "an infectiously fun bop" and hoped that Twice would get the attention that they deserve in the West. For Atwood Magazine, Danny Vagnoni contrasted "The Feels" with Twice's second Korean studio album, Eyes Wide Open (2020), as it took an opposite direction from the album—which he described as a "catalogue of darker, minor key tracks"—and gave something that resembles the optimism of their earlier work. The Harvard Crimson's Allison S. Park praised its upbeat, relatable depiction of first love. Despite using clichéd phrases, the song's high-quality production and consistent bass beat effectively convey the fluttering feelings of love. Park highlights the song's relatability and Twice's dependable character as a top K-pop group, noting that this single is their first all-English release aimed at expanding their international presence. Mashable named "The Feels" as "[one] of the best, most influential K-pop performances of 2021". Likewise, NME included the song in their list, with Daly calling it a "perfect soundtrack" and complimenting the members' "confident" vocal delivery and attitude. Similarly, Rolling Stone's Kristine Kwak praised the "slick" bass line and vocal production; they continue to call the song's chorus "one of the year's most effervescent choruses".

"The Feels" on year-end lists
Critic/Publication	List	Rank	Ref.
Insider	Best K-pop Songs of 2021	7	
NME	25 Best K-pop Songs of 2021	4	
Pitchfork	Top Albums and Songs of 2021	71	
Rolling Stone	50 Best Songs of 2021	50	
South China Morning Post	20 Best K-pop Songs of 2021	15	

=== Commercial performance ===
In South Korea, "The Feels" peaked at number 94 on the Gaon Digital Chart, and at number 56 on the K-pop Hot 100. In Japan, it peaked at number three on both the Billboard Japan Hot 100, and Oricon Combined Singles Chart. The single ultimately received a double platinum certification from the Recording Industry Association of Japan for surpassing 200 million streams. In the United States, it debuted at number 83 on the Billboard Hot 100, making Twice the 4th K-pop group to chart there, after Wonder Girls, BTS, and Blackpink, and garnered 4.7 million streams, 208,000 radio impressions, and 10,400 digital sales in its first week. In January 2022, the song landed at number 40 on the US Mainstream Top 40, marking Twice's first appearance on the chart. In November 2022, it received a gold certification from the Recording Industry Association of America for selling over 500,000 certified units. The song also charted in New Zealand, Malaysia, Singapore, the UK Singles Chart, and Canada. Worldwide, it accumulated 50.9 million global streams and 8,800 global downloads in its first week, debuted at number 12 on the Billboard Global 200, making it Twice's highest performing song on the chart.

== Music video ==
=== Background ===
A scene in the music video shows the members performing the song's choreography in a deluxe wardrobe.

"The Feels" music video was uploaded to YouTube on October 1, 2021. It was preceded by a teaser released on JYP Entertainment's official YouTube channel on August 23, 2021, featuring the girls singing and dancing in a dressing room, wearing plaid coats and dresses reminiscent of the 1995 film Clueless. On September 27, 2021, another teaser was released on their official social media channels. Prior to this, snippets of the song had been shared through the group's TikTok content. At the end of the music video, they teased their third Korean studio album (sixth overall) and fourth world tour.

=== Synopsis and reception ===
The music video was described as a "glittery, retro prom-themed" spectacle by People, and as a "technicolor" visual feast by Billboard. It starts with a prom's invitation being passed underneath the door of the "deluxe wardrobe" that Twice appear in. The members are excited to see they've been invited to prom. The video then shows the girls getting ready and talking about their romantic interests. In the second half, their prom fantasy comes to life with a sea blue theme, big balloon arches, decorated tables, and a prom queen throne. The Twice members take a break from the party to perform, dancing to the song's chorus. Rolling Stone India included the music video in their list of the 21 Best Korean Music Videos of 2021, praising its production quality, compelling storyline, and the group's magnetic personalities. The video received a nomination for Best K-Pop at the 2022 MTV Video Music Awards.

== Track listing ==
- Digital download / streaming
1. "The Feels" – 3:18
2. "The Feels" (The Stereotypes Remix) – 3:22
3. "The Feels" (Yves V Remix) – 2:15
4. "The Feels" (Instrumental) – 3:18
5. "The Feels" (The Stereotypes Remix Instrumental) – 3:22
6. "The Feels" (Yves V Remix Instrumental) – 2:15
- Remixes EP
1. "The Feels" (Benny Benassi Remix) – 3:05
2. "The Feels" – 3:18
3. "The Feels" (The Stereotypes Remix) – 3:22
4. "The Feels" (Yves V Remix) – 2:15
5. "The Feels" (Instrumental) – 3:18
6. "The Feels" (Benny Benassi Remix Extended) – 4:09
7. "The Feels" (The Stereotypes Remix Instrumental) – 3:22
8. "The Feels" (Yves V Remix Instrumental) – 2:15
9. "The Feels" (Benny Benassi Remix Instrumental) – 3:04

== Credits and personnel ==
Credits adapted from Melon

Recording

- Recorded at JYPE Studios (Seoul, South Korea)
- Mixed at Mirrorball Studios (North Hollywood, California)
- Mastered at 821 Sound Mastering (South Korea)
- Immersive mixed at MixStar Studios (Virginia Beach, VA)

Personnel

- Twice – vocals
- Sophia Pae – background vocals, vocal director
- Anna Timgren – lyricist, composition
- Boy Matthews – lyricist
- Justin Reinstein – lyricist, composition, arrangement, synth, sessions Programming
- Woo Min Lee "collapsedone" – lyricist, composition, arrangement, synth, guitar, bass, vocal director, vocal editing, sessions Programming
- Sehee Eom – recording engineer
- Lee Sang-yeop – recording engineer
- Tony Maserati – mixer
- David K Younghyun – assistant mixer
- Kwon Namwoo – mastering engineer
- John Hanes – immersive mix engineering

== Charts ==
=== Weekly charts ===
Chart performance
Chart (2021–2022)	Peak position
Canada Hot 100 (Billboard)	56
Global 200 (Billboard)	12
Japan Hot 100 (Billboard)	3
Japan Combined Singles (Oricon)	3
Malaysia (RIM)	8
New Zealand Hot Singles (RMNZ)	4
Singapore (RIAS)	4
South Korea (Gaon)	94
South Korea (K-pop Hot 100)	56
Spain Digital Song Sales (Billboard)	10
UK Singles (Official Charts)	80
UK Indie (Official Charts)	16
US Billboard Hot 100	83
US Pop Airplay (Billboard)	40

=== Year-end charts ===
Year-end chart performance
Chart (2022)	Position
Global Excl. US (Billboard)	130
Japan (Japan Hot 100)	38

== Certifications ==
Certifications
Region	Certification	Certified units/sales
New Zealand (RMNZ)	Gold	15,000^{‡}
United States (RIAA)	Gold	500,000^{‡}
Streaming
Japan (RIAJ)	2× Platinum	200,000,000^{†}
^{‡} Sales+streaming figures based on certification alone.^{†} Streaming-only figures based on certification alone.

== Release history ==
Release dates and formats
Country	Date	Format(s)	Version	Label	Ref.
Various	October 1, 2021	Digital download; streaming	Original	JYP; Republic	
Various	February 4, 2022	Digital download; streaming	Benny Benassi remix	JYP; Republic	
