= Kep1er discography =

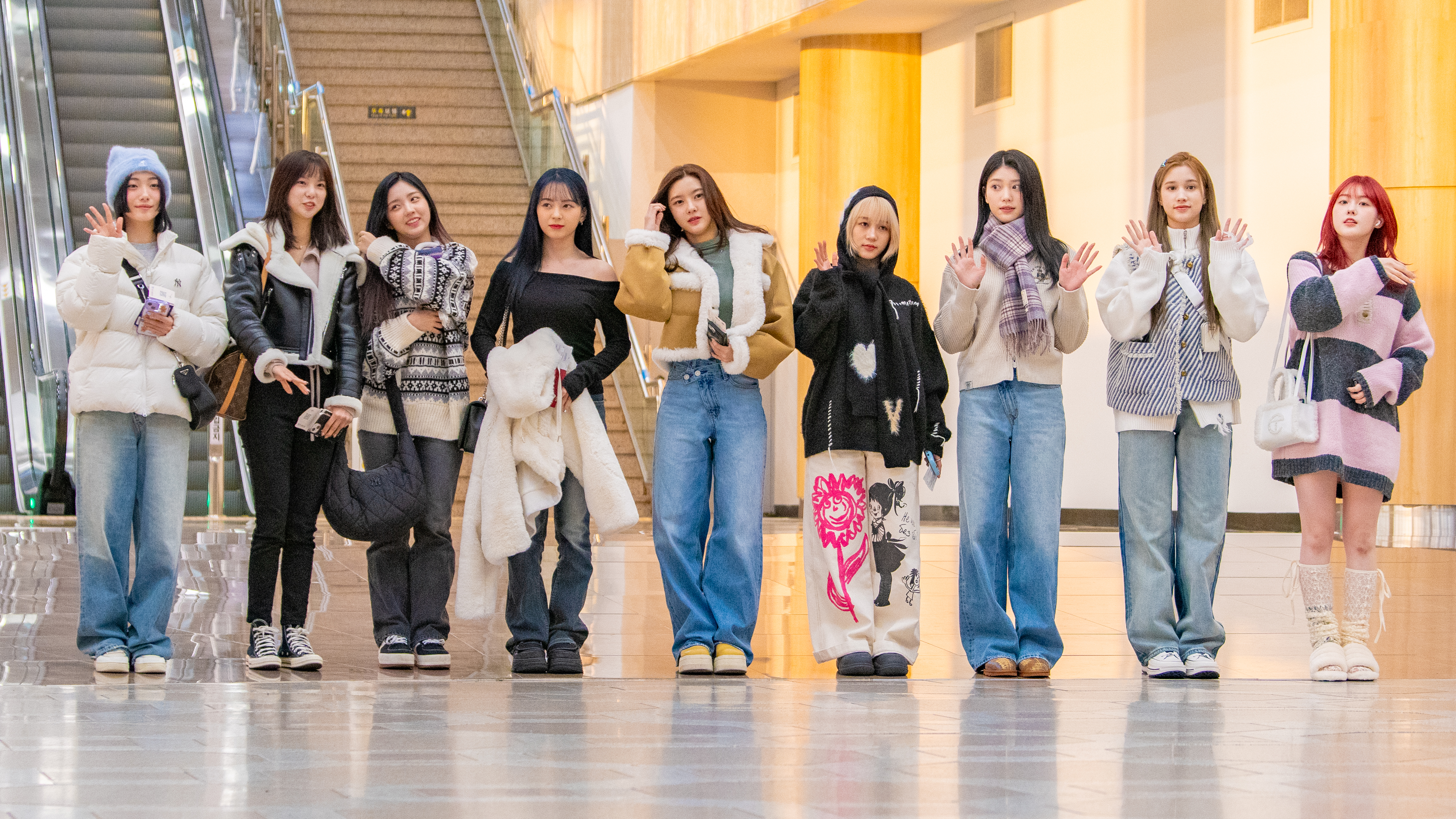
- Kep1er in November 2023
- Studio albums: 2
- EPs: 9
- Singles: 14
- Promotional singles: 4

South Korean girl group Kep1er has released two studio albums, nine extended plays, fourteen singles, and four promotional singles. As of June 2025, Kep1er has sold over 2.1 million combined albums.

The group made their debut with the extended play First Impact. The EP sold approximately 400,000 copies and received a platinum certification in South Korea. Its title track, "Wa Da Da", peaked at number 75 on the Circle Digital Chart in South Korea and was also certified platinum for streaming in Japan.

The group's Japanese debut single, "Fly-Up", was released on September 7, 2022, under the Sony Music Entertainment Japan subsidiary Ariola Japan.

Kep1er's first Japanese studio album, Kep1going, debuted and peaked at number 2 on the Billboard Japan Hot Albums chart and number 3 on the Oricon Albums Chart. It received a gold certification in Japan, with approximately 100,000 copies sold. This is then followed by their first Korean studio album, Kep1going On, which debuted at number 5 on the Circle Album Chart.

== Studio albums ==
=== Korean studio albums ===
List of Korean studio albums, showing selected details, chart positions and sales figures
Title	Details	Peak chart positions			Sales
Title	Details	KOR	JPN	JPN Hot	Sales
Kep1going On	Released: June 3, 2024; Labels: Swing, WakeOne; Formats: CD, digital download, streaming	5	13	39	KOR: 119,600; JPN: 8,395

=== Japanese studio albums ===
List of Japanese studio albums, showing selected details, chart positions, sales figures, and certifications
Title	Details	Peak chart positions		Sales	Certifications
Title	Details	JPN	JPN Hot	Sales	Certifications
Kep1going	Released: May 8, 2024; Labels: WakeOne, Ariola Japan; Formats: CD, digital download, streaming	3	2	JPN: 69,678	RIAJ: Gold (phy.)

== Extended plays ==
=== Korean extended plays ===
List of Korean extended plays, showing selected details, selected chart positions, sales figures, and certifications
Title	Details	Peak chart positions						Sales	Certifications
Title	Details	KOR	FIN	JPN	JPN Hot	US	US World	Sales	Certifications
First Impact	Released: January 3, 2022; Labels: Swing, WakeOne; Formats: CD, digital download, streaming	1	19	2	10	—	—	KOR: 396,102; JPN: 37,625	KMCA: Platinum
Doublast	Released: June 20, 2022; Labels: Swing, WakeOne; Formats: CD, digital download, streaming	2	— (Note: Doublast did not peak on the Official Finnish Albums Chart, but it peaked at number 7 on the Physical Albums Chart.)	9	24	—	—	KOR: 353,401; JPN: 33,056	KMCA: Platinum
Troubleshooter	Released: October 13, 2022; Labels: Swing, WakeOne; Formats: CD, digital download, streaming	2	—	6	21	—	—	KOR: 267,476; JPN: 21,935	KMCA: Platinum
Lovestruck!	Released: April 10, 2023; Labels: Swing, WakeOne; Formats: CD, digital download, streaming	2	—	7	29	—	—	KOR: 195,786; JPN: 14,438	—N/a
Magic Hour	Released: September 25, 2023; Labels: Swing, WakeOne; Formats: CD, digital download, streaming	3	—	7	61	—	—	KOR: 141,529; JPN: 18,803	—N/a
Tipi-tap	Released: November 1, 2024; Labels: WakeOne, Klap; Formats: CD, digital download, streaming	3	—	13	77	147	4	KOR: 184,308; JPN: 4,908	—N/a
Bubble Gum	Released: August 19, 2025; Labels: WakeOne, Klap; Formats: CD, NFC, digital download, streaming	3	—	46	— (Note: Bubble Gum did not peak on the Billboard Japan Hot Albums chart, but it peaked at number 13 on the Download Albums chart.)	—	—	KOR: 127,905; JPN: 784	—N/a
Crack Code	Released: March 31, 2026; Labels: WakeOne, Klap; Formats: CD, digital download, streaming; Track listing: 1. "I Am Kep1"; 2. "Killa (Face the Other Me)"; 3. "Mic Check"; 4. "Lowkey" (있지...); 5. "Addicted 2 Ya"	5	—	20	—	—	—	KOR: 77,979; JPN: 2,522	—N/a
"—" denotes a recording that did not chart or was not released in that territory.

=== Japanese extended plays ===
List of Japanese extended plays, showing selected details, selected chart positions, and sales figures
Title	Details	Peak chart positions		Sales
Title	Details	JPN	JPN Hot	Sales
Against the World	Released: April 30, 2025; Labels: WakeOne, Ariola Japan; Formats: CD, digital download, streaming	2	10	JPN: 37,131

== Singles ==
=== Korean singles ===
List of Korean singles, showing year released, selected chart positions, certifications, and name of the album
Title	Year	Peak chart positions									Certifications	Album
Title	Year	KOR	KOR Songs	JPN Comb.	JPN Hot	NZ Hot	SGP	VIE (Note: The Billboard Vietnam Hot 100 chart was temporarily suspended between January 2024 and May 2025.)	US World	WW	Certifications	Album
"Wa Da Da"	2022	75	70	7	9	24	11	73	13	77	RIAJ: Platinum (st.)	First Impact
"Up!"	2022	— (Note: "Up! " did not enter the Gaon Digital Chart, but peaked at number 14 on the component Download Chart.)	—	36	27	—	29	—	—	— (Note: "Up! " did not enter the Billboard Global 200, but peaked at number 167 on the Global Excl. US.)	—N/a	Doublast
"We Fresh"	2022	— (Note: "We Fresh" did not enter the Circle Digital Chart, but peaked at number 38 on the component Download Chart.)	—	—	— (Note: "We Fresh" did not enter the Billboard Japan Hot 100, but peaked at number 76 on the component Download Songs.)	—	—	—	—	—	—N/a	Troubleshooter
"Giddy"	2023	— (Note: "Giddy" did not enter the Circle Digital Chart, but peaked at number 30 on the component Download Chart.)	—	—	—	—	—	—	—	—	—N/a	Lovestruck!
"Galileo"	2023	— (Note: "Galileo" did not enter the Circle Digital Chart, but peaked at number 31 on the component Download Chart.)	—	—	96	—	—	—	—	—	—N/a	Magic Hour
"Shooting Star"	2024	— (Note: "Shooting Star" did not enter the Circle Digital Chart, but peaked at number 12 on the component Download Chart.)	—	—	— (Note: "Shooting Star" did not enter the Billboard Japan Hot 100, but peaked at number 72 on the Download Songs.)	—	—	—	—	—	—N/a	Kep1going On
"Tipi-tap"	2024	— (Note: "Tipi-tap" did not enter the Circle Digital Chart, but peaked at number 33 on the component Download Chart.)	—	—	—	—	—	—	—	—	—N/a	Tipi-tap
"Bubble Gum"	2025	— (Note: "Bubble Gum" did not enter the Circle Digital Chart, but peaked at number 7 on the component Download Chart.)	—	—	—	—	—	—	—	—	—N/a	Bubble Gum
"Killa (Face the Other Me)"	2026	— (Note: "Killa (Face the Other Me)" did not enter the Circle Digital Chart, but peaked at number 15 on the component Download Chart.)	—	—	—	—	—	—	—	—	—N/a	Crack Code
"—" denotes a recording that did not chart or was not released in that territory. "*" denotes a chart did not exist at that time.

=== Japanese singles ===
List of Japanese singles, showing year released, selected chart positions, sales figures, certifications, and name of the album
Title	Year	Peak chart positions		Sales	Certifications	Album
Title	Year	JPN	JPN Hot	Sales	Certifications	Album
"Wing Wing"	2022	2	3	JPN: 88,911	RIAJ: Gold (phy.)	Kep1going
"I Do! Do You?"	2023	3	3	JPN: 65,592 (phy.)	RIAJ: Gold (phy.)	Kep1going
"Grand Prix"	2023	2	6	JPN: 68,448 (phy.)	RIAJ: Gold (phy.)	Kep1going
"Straight Line"	2024	—	—	—N/a	—N/a	Kep1going
"Yum"	2025	—	—	—N/a	—N/a	Against the World
"—" denotes a recording that did not chart or was not released in that territory.

== Promotional singles ==
List of promotional singles, showing year released, selected chart positions, and name of the album
Title	Year	Peak chart position	Album
Title	Year	KOR DL	Album
"Sugar Rush"	2022	82	Non-album single
"Rescue Tayo"	2023	160	Non-album single
"I Stay"	2026	115	Ne Zha 2 OST

== Other charted songs ==
List of other charted songs, showing year released, selected chart positions, and name of the album
Title	Year	Peak chart position		Album
Title	Year	KOR DL	US World	Album
"See the Light"	2022	128	—	First Impact
"MVSK"	2022	96	—	First Impact
"Shine" (Kep1er version)	2022	118	—	First Impact
"Another Dream" (Kep1er version)	2022	143	—	First Impact
"OOO" (Kep1er version)	2022	135	—	First Impact
"Don't Go" (나비소녀) (with Loona as Sun and Moon)	2022	—	14	<Queendom 2> Position Unit Battle Part.1-1
"Purr" (with Viviz as Kev1z)	2022	118	—	<Queendom 2> Position Unit Battle Part 1-2
"The Girls (Can't Turn Me Down)"	2022	154	—	<Queendom 2> Final
"Le Voya9e"	2022	65	—	Doublast
"Attention"	2022	75	—	Doublast
"Good Night"	2022	78	—	Doublast
"Rewind"	2022	79	—	Doublast
"Lion Tamer"	2022	182	—	Troubleshooter
"Dreams"	2022	185	—	Troubleshooter
"Downtown"	2022	186	—	Troubleshooter
"The Girls (Can't Turn Me Down)" (Remastered)	2022	198	—	Troubleshooter
"Back to the City"	2023	79	—	Lovestruck!
"LVLY"	2023	85	—	Lovestruck!
"Why"	2023	88	—	Lovestruck!
"Happy Ending"	2023	90	—	Lovestruck!
"The Door"	2023	146	—	Magic Hour
"Love on Lock"	2023	152	—	Magic Hour
"Tropical Light"	2023	160	—	Magic Hour
"Tape"	2023	167	—	Magic Hour
"Double Up! "	2024	83	—	Kep1going On
"Curious"	2024	87	—	Kep1going On
"Last Carnival"	2024	90	—	Kep1going On
"Straight Line" (Korean version)	2024	91	—	Kep1going On
"Problem"	2024	92	—	Kep1going On
"Grand Prix" (Korean version)	2024	93	—	Kep1going On
"Push Button"	2024	95	—	Kep1going On
"Dear Diary"	2024	97	—	Kep1going On
"Flowers, Flutter, Your Heart"	2024	98	—	Kep1going On
"Sync-love"	2024	156	—	Tipi-tap
"Drip"	2024	169	—	Tipi-tap
"Heart Surf"	2024	170	—	Tipi-tap
"Bitter Taste"	2024	174	—	Tipi-tap
"Don't Be Dumb"	2025	111	—	Bubble Gum
"Ice Tea"	2025	116	—	Bubble Gum
"Yum" (Korean version)	2025	117	—	Bubble Gum
"Taste Better"	2025	126	—	Bubble Gum
"—" denotes a recording that did not chart or was not released in that territory
