= List of South Korean girl groups =

South Korean girl groups refer to the all-female idol groups who are part of the K-pop industry. South Korean girl groups have aided in the globalization of Korean culture. The Jeogori Sisters and The Kim Sisters have been noted as the origins of South Korean girl groups.

== First generation ==
The term "first generation" refers to South Korean idol groups which debuted from 1996 to 2002.

- As One (1999–2017, 2019)
- Baby Vox (1997–2006, 2024)
- Chakra (2000–06)
- Cleo (1999–2005)
- Diva (1997–2005)
- Fin.K.L (1998–2005, 2019, 2026)
- Isak N Jiyeon (2002–04)
- Jewelry (2001–15, 2018)
- Kiss (2001–02, 2016)
- Luv (2002–03)
- M.I.L.K. (2001–03)
- Papaya (2000–01)
- S.E.S. (1997–2002, 2016–17)
- Shinvi (2002–03)
- Sugar (2001–06)
- T.T.Ma (1999–2002)

== Second generation ==
The term "second generation" refers to South Korean idol groups which debuted from 2003 to 2011.

=== Best-selling girl groups ===
Best-selling generation two South Korean girl groups
Group and years active	Notable singles	Platinum-certified albums
2NE1 (2009–15, 2024–25)	"Clap Your Hands" (2010) (Note: Top-ten song on South Korea's Circle Digital Chart, formerly Gaon Digital Chart.); "Go Away" (2010) (Note: Number-one song on South Korea's Circle Digital Chart, formerly Gaon Digital Chart.); "Can't Nobody" (2010); "It Hurts (Slow)" (2010); "Lonely" (2011); "I Am the Best" (2011) (Note: The song is certified Gold in streaming, by the Recording Industry Association of Japan.); "Hate You" (2011); "Ugly" (2011); "I Love You" (2012) (Note: Top-ten song on Japan's Oricon Singles Chart.); "Falling in Love" (2013); "Do You Love Me" (2013); "Missing You" (2013); "Come Back Home" (2014); "Gotta Be You" (2014)	—N/a
4Minute (2009–16)	"HuH" (2010); "I My Me Mine" (2010); "Heart to Heart" (2011); "Mirror Mirror" (2011); "Volume Up" (2012); "What's Your Name" (2013); "Is It Poppin'?" (2013); "Gain Weight" (2014); "Whatcha Doin' Today" (2014); "Crazy" (2015)	—N/a
After School (2009–15, 2021)	"Because of You" (2009); "Bang!" (2010); "Love Love Love" (2010); "Shampoo" (2011); "In the Night Sky" (2011); "Rambling Girls" (2012); "Lady Luck" (2012); "Dilly Dally" (2012); "First Love" (2013); "Heaven" (2013)	—N/a
Apink (since 2011)	"NoNoNo" (2013); "Good Morning Baby" (2014); "Mr. Chu" (2014); "Luv" (2014); "Remember" (2015); "Sunday Monday" (2015); "Only One" (2016); "Summer Time" (2016); "Five" (2017); "Bye Bye" (2017); "More Go! Go!" (2017); "Orion" (2017); "I'm So Sick" (2018); "Dumhdurum" (2020)	—N/a
Brave Girls (2011–13, 2016–18, 2020–23)	"Rollin'" (2017); "We Ride" (2020); "Chi Mat Ba Ram" (2021)	—N/a
Brown Eyed Girls (2006–15, 2019)	"Hot Shot" (2011); "Sixth Sense" (2011); "Cleansing Cream" (2011); "One Summer Night" (2012); "Recipe" (2013); "Kill Bill" (2013); "Brave New World" (2015)	—N/a
Davichi (since 2008)	"Time, Please Stop" (2010); "From Me to You" (2010); "Wonder Woman" (2010); "Don't Say Goodbye" (2011); "We Were in Love" (2011); "I'll Think of You" (2012); "Do Men Cry" (2012); "Turtle" (2013); "Just Two of Us" (2013); "Be Warmed" (2013); "Missing You Today" (2013); "The Letter" (2013); "Again" (2014); "Cry Again" (2015); "Sorry, I'm Happy" (2015); "Two Lovers" (2015); "White" (2015); "Beside Me" (2016); "You Call It Romance" (2016); "Unspoken Words" (2019) (Note: The song is certified Platinum in streaming, by the Korea Music Content Association.); "Dear." (2019); "Just Hug Me" (2021); "Everyday Christmas" (2021); "Time Capsule" (2025)	—N/a
f(x) (2009–16, 2019)	"Nu ABO" (2010); "Pinocchio (Danger)" (2011); "Hot Summer" (2011); "Electric Shock" (2012); "Rum Pum Pum Pum" (2013); "Red Light" (2014); "4 Walls" (2015)	—N/a
Girl's Day (2010–15, 2017–18)	"Twinkle Twinkle" (2011); "Expect" (2013); "Female President" (2013); "Please Tell Me" (2013); "Something" (2014); "Darling" (2014); "I Miss You" (2014); "Ring My Bell" (2015); "I'll Be Yours" (2017)	—N/a
Girls' Generation (2007–17, 2021–22)	"Gee" (2009) (Note: The song is certified Gold in physical sales, by the Recording Industry Association of Japan.); "Genie" (2009); "Oh!" (2010) (Note: Number-one song on Japan's Oricon Singles Chart.); "Run Devil Run" (2010); "Hoot" (2010); "Mr. Taxi" (2011); "The Boys" (2011); "Paparazzi" (2012); "All My Love is for You" (2012); "Flower Power" (2012); "Dancing Queen" (2012); "I Got a Boy" (2013); "Love & Girls" (2013); "Galaxy Supernova" (2013); "Mr.Mr." (2014); "Catch Me If You Can" (2015); "Party" (2015); "Lion Heart" (2015); "Forever 1" (2022)	Girls' Generation (2011); Girls & Peace (2012); Forever 1 (2022)
Kara (2007–15, since 2022)	"Mister" (2009); "Lupin" (2010); "Jumping" (2010); "Jet Coaster Love" (2011); "Go Go Summer!" (2011); "Step" (2011); "Winter Magic" (2011); "Speed Up" (2012); "Girl's Power" (2012); "Pandora" (2012); "Electric Boy" (2012); "Bye Bye Happy Days!" (2013); "Thank You Summer Love" (2013); "Runaway" (2013); "Damaged Lady" (2013); "French Kiss" (2013); "Mamma Mia!" (2014); "Summer☆Gic" (2015); "Sunshine Miracle" (2015); "Sunny Days" (2015); "I Do I Do" (2024)	Kara Best 2007–2010 (2010); Girl's Talk (2010); Super Girl (2011); Girls Forever (2012)
Miss A (2010–13, 2015)	"Bad Girl Good Girl" (2010); "Breathe" (2010); "Love Alone" (2011); "Good-bye Baby" (2011); "Touch" (2012); "I Don't Need a Man" (2012); "Hush" (2013); "Only You" (2015)	—N/a
Secret (2009–14, 2026)	"Magic" (2010); "Madonna" (2010); "Shy Boy" (2011); "Starlight Moonlight" (2011); "Love Is Move" (2011); "Poison" (2012); "Talk That" (2012); "Yoohoo" (2013)	—N/a
Sistar (2010–17)	"Push Push" (2010); "Shady Girl" (2010); "How Dare You" (2010); "So Cool" (2011); "Amazed" (2011); "Alone" (2012); "Loving U" (2012); "Give It to Me" (2013); "Touch My Body" (2014); "I Swear" (2014); "Shake It" (2015); "I Like That" (2016); "Lonely" (2017)	—N/a
T-ara (2009–17, 2020–22, since 2024)	"Bo Peep Bo Peep" (2009); "Like the First Time" (2009); "You Drive Me Crazy" (2010); "Why Are You Being Like This?" (2010); "Yayaya" (2010); "Roly-Poly" (2011); "Cry Cry" (2011); "We Were in Love" (2011); "Lovey-Dovey" (2012); "Day by Day" (2012); "Sexy Love" (2012); "Bunny Style!" (2013); "Number Nine" (2013); "Lead the Way" (2014); "La'boon" (2014)	Jewelry Box (2012)
Wonder Girls (2007–17)	"2 Different Tears" (2010); "Be My Baby" (2011); "The DJ Is Mine" (2012); "Like This" (2012); "I Feel You" (2015); "Why So Lonely" (2016)	—N/a

=== Other girl groups ===
- 2NB (2006–12, 2016–18) (Note: Since Son-yoona's departure from the group in 2018, Kim Hyo-jin promotes as 2NB as a solo act.)
- Big Mama (2003–12, 2021–24)
- Black Pearl (2007–12)
- Blady (2011–17)
- C-REAL (2011–14)
- Chocolat (2011–17)
- Dal Shabet (2011–16, 2019)
- F-ve Dolls (2011–15)
- Gavy NJ (2005–22)
- Girl Friends (2006–07)
- GP Basic (2010–15)
- The Grace (2005–10)
- JQT (2009–12)
- LPG (2005–16)
- Miss S (2008–16)
- Nine Muses (2010–19, 2025)
- Rainbow (2009–16, 2019)
- Rania (2011–15)
- SeeYa (2006–11, 2020, 2026)
- Skarf (2011–14)
- Stellar (2011–18)
- Sorea Band (2005–14)
- Sunny Hill (since 2007)

== Third generation ==
The term "third generation" refers to South Korean idol groups which debuted from 2012 to 2017.

=== Best-selling girl groups ===
Generation three South Korean girl groups that have a million-seller single on Circle Digital Chart, formerly Gaon Digital Chart.

Best-selling generation three South Korean girl groups
Group and years active	Notable singles	Platinum-certified albums
AOA (2012–19)	"Short Hair" (2014); "Like a Cat" (2014); "Heart Attack" (2015); "Give Me the Love" (2016); "Good Luck" (2016); "Bingle Bangle" (2018)	—N/a
Blackpink (since 2016)	"Whistle" (2016); "Boombayah" (2016); "Playing with Fire" (2016); "Stay" (2016); "As If It's Your Last" (2017); "Ddu-Du Ddu-Du" (2018) (Note: The song is certified Platinum in download, by the Korea Music Content Association.) (Note: The song is certified Gold, by the Recording Industry Association of America.) (Note: The song is certified Platinum by the Australian Recording Industry Association; Gold by the Recording Industry Association of Japan, France's Syndicat National de l'Édition Phonographique, and the Polish Society of the Phonographic Industry; and Silver by the British Phonographic Industry.); "Kill This Love" (2019) (Note: The song is certified Platinum by the Australian Recording Industry Association, and the Recording Industry Association of Japan; Gold by France's Syndicat National de l'Édition Phonographique, Portugal's Associação Fonográfica Portuguesa, and the Polish Society of the Phonographic Industry; and Silver by the British Phonographic Industry.); "How You Like That" (2020) (Note: The song is certified 2× Platinum by Music Canada; Platinum by the Australian Recording Industry Association, and the Recording Industry Association of Japan; Gold by France's Syndicat National de l'Édition Phonographique, Portugal's Associação Fonográfica Portuguesa, and the Polish Society of the Phonographic Industry; and Silver by the British Phonographic Industry.); "Ice Cream" (2020) (Note: Top-ten song on the Billboard Global 200.) (Note: The song is certified Platinum by the Australian Recording Industry Association and Gold by the Recording Industry Association of Japan, Music Canada, and International Federation of the Phonographic Industry.); "Lovesick Girls" (2020) (Note: The song is certified Platinum by the Recording Industry Association of Japan, and Gold by the Australian Recording Industry Association.); "Pink Venom" (2022) (Note: Number-one song on the Billboard Global 200.) (Note: The song is certified Platinum by Music Canada, and Gold by the Australian Recording Industry Association and the Recording Industry Association of Japan.); "Shut Down" (2022); "Jump" (2025); "Go" (2026)	Square Up (2018); Kill This Love (2019); How You Like That (2020); The Album (2020); Born Pink (2022); Deadline (2026)
Bolbbalgan4 (2016–20) (Note: Since Woo Ji-yoon's departure from the group in April 2020, Ahn Ji-young promotes as Bolbbalgan4 as a solo act.)	"Galaxy" (2016); "Tell Me You Love Me" (2016); "Some" (2017); "Lost Without You" (2017); "Mohae" (2017); "To My Youth" (2017); "#First Love" (2018); "Travel" (2018); "Born" (2019); "Stars Over Me" (2019); "Workaholic" (2019); "Leo" (2020)	—N/a
EXID (2012–20, 2022, 2024–25)	"Up & Down" (2014); "Ah Yeah" (2015); "Hot Pink" (2015); "L.I.E." (2016); "Night Rather than Day" (2017); "DDD" (2017)	—N/a
GFriend (2015–21, 2024–25)	"Me Gustas Tu" (2015); "Rough" (2016); "Navillera" (2016); "Fingertip" (2017); "Love Whisper" (2017); "Time for the Moon Night" (2018); "Sunny Summer" (2018) (Note: Top-ten song on the K-pop Hot 100.); "Memoria" (2018); "Sunrise" (2019); "Flower" (2019)	—N/a
I.O.I (2016–17, 2026)	"Dream Girls" (2016); "Whatta Man" (2016); "Very Very Very" (2016); "Downpour" (2017); "Suddenly" (2026)	—N/a
Mamamoo (2014–24, 2026)	"Peppermint Chocolate" (2014); "Um Oh Ah Yeh" (2015); "I Miss You" (2016); "Taller Than You" (2016); "You're the Best" (2016); "New York" (2016); "Décalcomanie" (2016); "Yes I Am" (2017); "Starry Night" (2018); "Rainy Season" (2018); "Egotistic" (2018); "Wind Flower" (2018); "Gogobebe" (2019); "Hip" (2019); "Dingga" (2020)	—N/a
Momoland (2016–23, since 2025)	"Bboom Bboom" (2018); "Baam" (2018); "I'm So Hot" (2019)	—N/a
Oh My Girl (since 2015)	"Secret Garden" (2018); "Nonstop" (2020); "Dun Dun Dance" (2021)	—N/a
Red Velvet (since 2014)	"Happiness" (2014); "Ice Cream Cake" (2015); "Dumb Dumb" (2015); "One of These Nights" (2016); "Russian Roulette" (2016); "Rookie" (2017); "Red Flavor" (2017); "Peek-a-Boo" (2017); "Bad Boy" (2018); "Power Up" (2018); "RBB (Really Bad Boy)" (2018); "Psycho" (2019); "Queendom" (2021); "Feel My Rhythm" (2022)	The ReVe Festival: Day 1 (2019); The ReVe Festival: Finale (2019); Queendom (2021); The ReVe Festival 2022 – Feel My Rhythm (2022); The ReVe Festival 2022 – Birthday (2022); Chill Kill (2023)
Twice (since 2015)	"Like Ooh-Ahh" (2015); "Cheer Up" (2016); "TT" (2016); "Knock Knock" (2017); "Signal" (2017); "One More Time" (2017) (Note: The song is certified Platinum in physical sales, by the Recording Industry Association of Japan.); "Likey" (2017) (Note: The song is certified Platinum in streaming, by the Recording Industry Association of Japan.); "Heart Shaker" (2017); "Candy Pop" (2018); "What Is Love?" (2018); "Wake Me Up" (2018) (Note: The song is certified 2× Platinum in physical sales, by the Recording Industry Association of Japan.); "I Want You Back" (2018); "Dance the Night Away" (2018); "BDZ" (2018); "Yes or Yes" (2018); "Fancy" (2019); "Happy Happy" (2019); "Breakthrough" (2019); "Feel Special" (2019) (Note: The song is certified 2× Platinum in streaming, by the Recording Industry Association of Japan.); "More & More" (2020); "Fanfare" (2020); "I Can't Stop Me" (2020); "Better" (2020); "Cry for Me" (2020); "Kura Kura" (2021); "Alcohol-Free" (2021); "Perfect World" (2021); "The Feels" (2021); "Scientist" (2021); "Doughnut" (2021); "Celebrate" (2022); "Talk That Talk" (2022); "Moonlight Sunrise" (2023); "Set Me Free" (2023); "Hare Hare" (2023); "One Spark" (2024); "Strategy" (2024)	#Twice (2017); What Is Love? (2018); Summer Nights (2018); BDZ (2018); Yes or Yes (2018); The Year of "Yes" (2018); #Twice2 (2019); Fancy You (2019); Feel Special (2019); &Twice (2019); More & More (2020); Eyes Wide Open (2020); Taste of Love (2021); Formula of Love: O+T=<3 (2021); Between 1&2 (2022); Ready to Be (2023); With You-th (2024); Strategy (2024); This Is For (2025); Enemy (2025); Ten: The Story Goes On (2025)

=== Other girl groups ===
- 2Eyes (2013–18)
- 15& (2012–15)
- 4L (2014–16)
- 4Ten (2014–16)
- April (2015–22)
- Alice (Note: Formerly known as Elris.) (2017–24)
- Badkiz (2014–20)
- The Barberettes (2012–19)
- Berry Good (2014–21)
- Bestie (2013–16)
- Busters (2017–23)
- Bob Girls (2014–15)
- CLC (2015–22)
- Crayon Pop (2012–17)
- D-Unit (2012–13)
- D.Holic (2014–17)
- DIA (2015–22)
- Dreamcatcher (2017–25)
- EvoL (2012–15)
- Favorite (2017–20)
- Fiestar (2012–18, since 2024)
- Gangkiz (2012–14)
- GI (2013–16)
- Glam (2012–15)
- Good Day (2017–19)
- Gugudan (2016–20)
- HashTag (2017–19, 2023)
- Hello Venus (2012–19)
- Hi Suhyun (2014)
- I.B.I (2016)
- Laboum (2014–22)
- Ladies' Code (2013–20)
- Laysha (2015–19, since 2023)
- Lip Service (2014–17)
- Loona (2016–23)
- Lovelyz (2014–21, 2024–25)
- MyB (2015–16)
- Melody Day (2012–18)
- P.O.P (2017–18)
- Playback (2015–17)
- Pristin (2016–19)
- Pungdeng-E (2013–19)
- Puretty (2012–14)
- Rubber Soul (2015–17)
- The SeeYa (2012–15)
- Sonamoo (2014–21)
- Spica (2012–17)
- S.I.S (2017–21)
- She'z (2012–14)
- Sunny Days (2012–16)
- Tahiti (2012–18)
- Tiny-G (2012–15)
- Two X (2012–17)
- Unicorn (2015–17)
- Wassup (2013–19)
- Weki Meki (2017–24)
- WJSN (since 2016)
- Year 7 Class 1 (2014–18)

== Fourth generation ==
The term "fourth generation" refers to South Korean idol groups which debuted from 2018 to present day.

=== Best-selling girl groups ===
Generation four South Korean girl groups that have multiple platinum-certified albums from Korea Music Content Association.

Best-selling generation four South Korean girl groups
Group and years active	Notable singles	Platinum-certified albums
Aespa (since 2020)	"Black Mamba" (2020); "Next Level" (2021); "Savage" (2021); "Dreams Come True" (2021); "Girls" (2022); "Spicy" (2023); "Drama" (2023); "Supernova" (2024); "Armageddon" (2024); "Hot Mess" (2024); "Whiplash" (2024); "Dirty Work" (2025); "Rich Man" (2025); "Lemonade" (2026)	Savage (2021); Girls (2022); My World (2023); Drama (2023); Armageddon (2024); Whiplash (2024); Dirty Work (2025); Rich Man (2025); Lemonade (2026)
Babymonster (since 2023)	"Sheesh" (2024); "Drip" (2024)	Babymons7er (2024); Drip (2024); We Go Up (2025); Choom (2026)
I-dle (Note: Formerly known as (G)I-dle.) (since 2018)	"Hann (Alone)" (2018); "Dumdi Dumdi" (2020); "Hwaa" (2021); "Tomboy" (2022); "Nxde" (2022); "Queencard" (2023); "Super Lady" (2024); "Klaxon" (2024)	I Burn (2021); I Never Die (2022); I Love (2022); I Feel (2023); 2 (2024); I Sway (2024); We Are (2025); We Made (2026)
Hearts2Hearts (since 2025)	"Rude!" (2026); "Lemon Tang" (2026)	The Chase (2025); Focus (2025); Lemon Tang (2026)
Illit (since 2024)	"Magnetic" (2024); "Toki Yo Tomare" (2025); "Not Cute Anymore" (2025); "It's Me" (2026); "You're Under Arrest" (2026)	Super Real Me (2024); I'll Like You (2024); Bomb (2025); Not Cute Anymore (2025); Mamihlapinatapai (2026)
Itzy (since 2019)	"Dalla Dalla" (2019) (Note: The song is certified Silver in streaming, by the Recording Industry Association of Japan.); "Icy" (2019); "Wannabe" (2020); "Not Shy" (2020); "In the Morning" (2021); "Voltage" (2022); "Sneakers" (2022); "Blah Blah Blah" (2022); "Algorhythm" (2024)	Not Shy (2020); Guess Who (2021); Crazy in Love (2021); Checkmate (2022); Cheshire (2022); Kill My Doubt (2023); Born to Be (2024); Gold (2024); Girls Will Be Girls (2025); Tunnel Vision (2025); Motto (2026)
Ive (since 2021)	"Eleven" (2021); "Love Dive" (2022); "After Like" (2022); "Kitsch" (2023); "I Am" (2023); "Either Way" (2023); "Baddie" (2023); "Heya" (2024); "Rebel Heart" (2025); "Attitude" (2025); "XOXZ" (2025); "Bang Bang" (2026); "Blackhole" (2026); "Looks Can Kill" (2026)	Eleven (2021); Love Dive (2022); After Like (2022); I've Ive (2023); I've Mine (2023); Ive Switch (2024); Ive Empathy (2025); Ive Secret (2025); Revive+ (2026)
Iz*One (2018–21)	"La Vie en Rose" (2018); "Suki to Iwasetai" (2019); "Bueno Aires" (2019); "Vampire" (2019); "Fiesta" (2020); "Secret Story of the Swan" (2020); "Panorama" (2020)	Color*Iz (2018); Heart*Iz (2019); Bloom*Iz (2020); Oneiric Diary (2020); One-reeler / Act IV (2020)
Kep1er (since 2022)	"Wa Da Da" (2022); "Wing Wing" (2022); "I Do! Do You?" (2023); "Grand Prix" (2023)	First Impact (2022); Doublast (2022); Troubleshooter (2022); Kep1going (2024)
Le Sserafim (since 2022)	"Fearless" (2022); "Antifragile" (2022); "Unforgiven" (2023); "Eve, Psyche & the Bluebeard's Wife" (2023); "Perfect Night" (2023); "Easy" (2024); "Smart" (2024); "Crazy" (2025); "Hot" (2025); "Different" (2025); "Spaghetti" (2025)	Fearless (2022); Antifragile (2022); Unforgiven (2023); Easy (2024); Crazy (2024); Hot (2025); Spaghetti (2025); Pureflow Pt. 1 (2026); Made My Night (2026)
NewJeans (2022–25)	"Attention" (2022); "Hype Boy" (2022); "Cookie" (2022); "Ditto" (2022) (Note: Top-ten song on the Billboard Global 200.); "OMG" (2023); "Super Shy" (2023); "ETA" (2023); "How Sweet" (2024); "Supernatural" (2024)	New Jeans (2022); OMG (2023); Get Up (2023); How Sweet (2024); Supernatural (2024)
Nmixx (since 2022)	"Blue Valentine" (2025); "Heavy Serenade" (2026)	Ad Mare (2022); Entwurf (2022); Expérgo (2023); A Midsummer Nmixx's Dream (2023); Fe3O4: Break (2024); Fe3O4: Stick Out (2024); Fe3O4: Forward (2025); Blue Valentine (2025); Heavy Serenade (2026)
STAYC (since 2020)	"ASAP" (2021); "Run2U" (2022); "Teddy Bear" (2023); "Lit" (2023); "Cheeky Icy Thang" (2024); "Meow" (2024)	Young-Luv.com (2022); We Need Love (2022); Teddy Bear (2023); Teenfresh (2023)

=== Other girl groups ===
- 3YE (2019–24)
- A2O Lite (since 2026)
- Ablume (since 2025)
- Ariaz (2019–22)
- Artms (since 2023)
- AtHeart (since 2025)
- Baby Dont Cry (since 2025)
- Badvillain (since 2024)
- BB Girls (since 2023)
- Billlie (since 2021)
- Blackswan (since 2020)
- Botopass (2020)
- BugAboo (2021–22)
- Bvndit (2019–22)
- Candy Shop (since 2024)
- Celeb Five (2018–19)
- Cherry Bullet (2019–24)
- Cignature (2020–24)
- Classy (since 2022)
- Craxy (since 2020)
- CSR (since 2022)
- Dodree (since 2026)
- DreamNote (2018–25)
- El7z Up (2023)
- Eternity (since 2021)
- Everglow (since 2019)
- Fanatics (2019–21)
- Fifty Fifty (since 2022)
- Fromis 9 (since 2018)
- Geenius (since 2024)
- Girlkind (2018–22)
- Golden Girls (2023–25)
- Got the Beat (2022–23)
- GWSN (2018–21)
- H1-Key (since 2022)
- Hiipe Princess (since 2026)
- Hinapia (2019–20)
- HITGS (since 2025)
- Honey Popcorn (2018–20)
- Hot Issue (2021–22)
- Ichillin' (since 2021)
- Ifeye (since 2025)
- ILY:1 (since 2022)
- Irris (2022–24)
- Izna (since 2024)
- Keyveatz (since 2026)
- KiiiKiii (since 2025)
- Kiiras (since 2025)
- Kiss of Life (since 2023)
- Lapillus (2022–24)
- Latency (since 2025)
- Lightsum (since 2021)
- Loossemble (2023–24)
- Lunarsolar (2020–22)
- Madein (Note: Formerly known as LimeLight.) (since 2022)
- Mave: (2023–24)
- Maywish (2018–19)
- Meovv (since 2024)
- Mimiirose (2022–26)
- Nature (2018–24)
- NeonPunch (2018–20)
- Ourbirthday (since 2026)
- OWIS (since 2026)
- Pink Fantasy (2018–23)
- Pixy (2021–23)
- Primrose (since 2023)
- Purple Kiss (2020–25)
- Purplebeck (2019–20)
- QWER (since 2023)
- Redsquare (2020–22)
- Refund Sisters (2020)
- Rescene (since 2024)
- Rocket Punch (2019–24)
- Saturday (2018–24)
- Say My Name (since 2024)
- Secret Number (since 2020)
- TDYA (2025)
- Tri.be (2021–24)
- TripleS (since 2022)
- Tuide (since 2026)
- Unchild (since 2026)
- Uni.T (2018)
- Unis (2024–26)
- Viviz (since 2022)
- VVUP (since 2024)
- Weeekly (2020–25)
- We Girls (2018–22)
- Wooah (since 2020)
- X:IN (since 2023)
- Young Posse (since 2023)

== See also ==
- List of girl groups
- List of best-selling girl groups
- List of South Korean boy bands
- List of South Korean idol groups
