= Kep1going =

- Digital cover

Studio album by Kep1er
- Released: May 8, 2024
- Genre: J-pop
- Length: 57:54
- Language: Japanese
- Label: WakeOne; Ariola Japan

Kep1er chronology
Magic Hour (2023)	Kep1going (2024)	Kep1going On (2024)

Singles from Kep1going
- 1. "Wing Wing" Released: September 7, 2022; 2. "I Do! Do You?" Released: March 15, 2023; 3. "Grand Prix" Released: November 22, 2023; 4. "Straight Line" Released: April 24, 2024

Kep1going is the first Japanese studio album and first studio album overall by South Korean girl group Kep1er. It was released by WakeOne and Ariola Japan on May 8, 2024. The regular and Type A edition of the album contains fifteen tracks, including the lead single "Straight Line" and the previous three Japanese singles recorded by the group—"Wing Wing", "I Do! Do You?" and "Grand Prix", while the Type B edition of the album features three additional tracks.

== Background ==
On February 13, 2024, WakeOne released a teaser image revealing plans for Kep1er to release a Japanese and Korean album within the year. Later that day, WakeOne announced the release of the group's first full Japanese album titled Kep1going. The track listing of the digital album was released on March 26.

== Commercial performance ==
On the day of release, Kep1going sold approximately 116,000 copies in Japan as recorded by Billboard Japan.

== Promotion ==
Prior to the release of the album, Kep1er performed the album's lead single "Straight Line" during their second Japanese concert tour Kep1er Japan Concert Tour 2024 'Fly-High' in February and March, and on CDTV Live! Live! on May 6.

== Track listing ==
Digital download and CD Type B edition track listing
No.	Title	Lyrics	Music	Length
1.	"Straight Line"	Ellie Love; Mashiro; Rose Blueming; Yu Sena	Jung Hohyeon (E.one); Jjean; Andy Love	2:45
2.	"Grand Prix"	Rose Blueming; Yu Sena; Hiyori Nara	Geek Boy; Caroline Gustavsson; Kyler Niko	3:07
3.	"We Fresh" (Japanese version)	KZ; B.O	KZ; Nthonius; Meisobo; B.O	3:16
4.	"Up!" (Japanese version)	Glory Face (Full8loom); Jinli (Full8loom)	Glory Face (Full8loom); Jinli (Full8loom)	3:12
5.	"Wa Da Da" (Japanese version)	BuildingOwner (PrismFilter); Elum (PrismFilter); Shannon; Danke; Hwang Yu-bin (XYXX); Odal Park; Lee Seu-ran; Kako; Elley; Ryo Ito	BuildingOwner (PrismFilter); Elum (PrismFilter); Shannon	3:04
6.	"MVSK" (Japanese version)	Jeong Ho-hyeon (E.one)	Jeong Ho-hyeon (E.one)	3:11
7.	"Celebrate (performed by Dayeon, Hikaru and Youngeun)"	Yu Sena	Willie Weeks; Paulina "Pau" Cerrilla; Kyler Niko	3:21
8.	"Highlight (performed by Mashiro, Chaehyun and Huening Bahiyyih)"	Minami; Hiyori Nara	Johan Gustafsson; Maia Wright; BLVSH	3:33
9.	"Cruise (performed by Yujin, Xiaoting and Yeseo)"	Hiyori Nara	FLUM3N; Maria Marcus; Chegim	3:19
10.	"Giddy" (Japanese version)	Hwang Yu-bin (Verygoods); Hiyori Nara	Stainboys (Room01); Alina Smith (Lyre); Annalise Morelli (Lyre); Gino Barletta; Justin Reinstein; Anna Timgren; Charlotte Wilson; Jjean; Isa Guerra	3:40
11.	"Galileo" (Japanese version)	Seo Ji-eum; Yu Sena; Rose Blueming; Kana Koizumi	Yejune Synne (SNNNY); Josh Fountain; Lauren Aquilina; Marcus Andersson; Hero (SNNNY); Deeno (SNNNY)	3:09
12.	"Wing Wing"	KZ; B.O	KZ; B.O; Nthonius; Meisobo	3:15
13.	"I Do! Do You?"	Tsingtao; Ryo Ito	Jonatan Gusmark; Emily Yeonseo Kim; Moa "Cazzi Opeia" Carlebecker; Ellen Berg; Moonshine	3:35
14.	"Sugar"	Hiyori Nara	Matthew Tishler; Cozi Zuehlsdorff	2:34
15.	"Don't Lose Your Smile"	Yu Sena; Mashiro	KZ; Kim Taeyeong; DINT; Charlotte Wilson; Rachael Chevlin	3:27
16.	"Wa Da Da" (Japanese version; Imlay remix)	BuildingOwner (PrismFilter); Elum (PrismFilter); Shannon; Danke; Hwang Yu-bin (XYXX); Odal Park; Lee Seu-ran; Kako; Elley; Ryo Ito	BuildingOwner (PrismFilter); Elum (PrismFilter); Shannon	3:16
17.	"Daisy"	Tsingtao; Aaron Kim	Ejae; Nicole "Kole" Cohen; Isaac Han; Aaron Kim; Ghostchild Ltd; Ashe Ahn	2:57
18.	"Together Forever"	Jinli (Full8loom); Minami	Gloryface (Full8loom); Kim Ga-yeong	3:32
Total length:				57:54

CD regular, Type A and Kep1ian edition track listing
No.	Title	Length
1.	"Straight Line"	2:45
2.	"Grand Prix"	3:07
3.	"We Fresh" (Japanese version)	3:16
4.	"Up!" (Japanese version)	3:12
5.	"Wa Da Da" (Japanese version)	3:04
6.	"MVSK" (Japanese version)	3:11
7.	"Giddy" (Japanese version)	3:40
8.	"Galileo" (Japanese version)	3:09
9.	"Wing Wing"	3:15
10.	"I Do! Do You?"	3:35
11.	"Sugar"	2:34
12.	"Don't Lose Your Smile"	3:27
13.	"Wa Da Da" (Japanese version; Imlay remix)	3:16
14.	"Daisy"	2:57
15.	"Together Forever"	3:32
Total length:		47:34

== Charts ==
=== Weekly charts ===
Weekly chart performance for Kep1going
Chart (2024)	Peak position
Japanese Albums (Oricon)	3
Japanese Combined Albums (Oricon)	3
Japanese Hot Albums (Billboard Japan)	2

=== Monthly charts ===
Monthly chart performance for Kep1going
Chart (2024)	Peak position
Japanese Albums (Oricon)	4

=== Year-end charts ===
Year-end chart performance for Kep1going
Chart (2024)	Position
Japanese Albums (Oricon)	62
Japanese Hot Albums (Billboard Japan)	42

== Certifications ==
Certifications for Kep1going
Region	Certification	Certified units/sales
Japan (RIAJ)	Gold	100,000^{^}
^{^} Shipments figures based on certification alone.

== Release history ==
Release history and formats for Kep1going
Region	Date	Format	Label
Various	May 8, 2024	Digital download; streaming	WakeOne; Ariola
Japan	May 8, 2024	CD	WakeOne; Ariola
