= Against the World (EP) =

- Digital cover

EP by Kep1er
- Released: April 30, 2025
- Genre: J-pop
- Length: 14:23
- Language: Japanese
- Labels: WakeOne; Ariola Japan; Klap

Kep1er chronology
Tipi-tap (2024)	Against the World (2025)	Bubble Gum (2025)

Singles from Against the World
- 1. "Yum" Released: April 9, 2025

Against the World is the first Japanese extended play and seventh overall by South Korean girl group Kep1er. It was released by WakeOne and Ariola Japan on April 30, 2025, and contains five tracks including the title track "Yum".

== Background ==
On January 6, 2025, WakeOne announced Kep1er's then untitled first Japanese EP, which will be released on April 30. On January 15, it was announced that the EP will contain five tracks, including two original Japanese tracks, and the Japanese version of "Shooting Star" and "Problem" from their first Korean studio album Kep1going On, and "Tipi-tap" from their sixth EP of the same name. Pre-order for the EP began on the same day. The name of the EP, Against the World, was unveiled on February 3. On February 17, the names of the two original Japanese songs, "Yum" and "Hell or Heaven", were revealed, with "Yum" serving as the title track. "Yum" was released on April 9.

== Track listing ==
Track listing for Against the World
No.	Title	Lyrics	Music	Arrangement	Length
1.	"Yum"	Yumika Kondo; Tsingtao; Kana Koizumi; Rose Blueming	Nthonius; Meisobo; KZ; Dint; Coomo	Nthonius; Meisobo	2:29
2.	"Hell or Heaven"	Sorano; Jinli (Full8loom)	Jinli (Full8loom); Glory Face; Bang Gun Woo (Full8loom); Keejun (Full8loom)	Glory Face; Bang Gun Woo (Full8loom); Keejun (Full8loom)	2:54
3.	"Tipi-tap" (Japanese version)	Se.A; 1Zone; Rid Kruger; Spoon (153/Joombas); Youha; B&NAz (153/Joombas); Ee-hwa (MUMW); Ee-mog (Jamfactory); Subbit (ARTiffect); Maria Marcus; Arineh Karmi	Se.A; Lee Won-jong; Kruger; Youha	Lee W.; Kruger	2:52
4.	"Shooting Star" (Japanese version)	Kevin_D (D_answer); Im Su-ran; Lee Seu-ran; Dayeon	Kevin_D (D_answer); Ddank (D_answer); Zamun (D_answer); Livy	Kevin_D (D_answer); Ddank (D_answer); Zamun (D_answer)	3:04
5.	"Problem" (Japanese version)	Charlie (153/Joombas)	Kevin_D (D_answer); Ddank (D_answer); Zamun (D_answer); Christian Fast; Julie Yu	Kevin_D (D_answer); Ddank (D_answer); Zamun (D_answer)	3:02
Total length:					14:23

== Charts ==
=== Weekly charts ===
Weekly chart performance for Against the World
Chart (2025)	Peak position
Japanese Albums (Oricon)	2
Japanese Combined Albums (Oricon)	2
Japanese Hot Albums (Billboard Japan)	10

=== Monthly charts ===
Monthly chart performance for Against the World
Chart (2025)	Position
Japanese Albums (Oricon)	13

=== Year-end charts ===
Year-end chart performance for Against the World
Chart (2025)	Position
Japanese Top Albums Sales (Billboard Japan)	89

== Release history ==
Release history and formats for Against the World
Region	Date	Format	Label
Various	April 30, 2025	Digital download; streaming	WakeOne; Ariola; Klap
Japan	April 30, 2025	CD	WakeOne; Ariola
