= Bubble Gum (EP) =

- Digital cover

EP by Kep1er
- Released: August 19, 2025
- Genre: K-pop
- Length: 12:19
- Language: Korean
- Labels: WakeOne; Klap

Kep1er chronology
Against the World (2025)	Bubble Gum (2025)	Crack Code (2026)

Singles from Bubble Gum
- 1. "Bubble Gum" Released: August 19, 2025

Bubble Gum is the seventh Korean extended play (EP) and eighth EP overall by South Korean girl group Kep1er. It was released by WakeOne and Klap Entertainment on August 19, 2025, and contains five tracks, including the lead single of the same name.

== Background ==
In June 2025, it was reported that Kep1er is preparing a new album slated for an August release. The following month, Kep1er member Young-eun went on a hiatus due to health issues, and thus will not be participating in promoting the new album.

On August 4, WakeOne announced Kep1er's seventh Korean EP Bubble Gum. Pre-orders for the EP began the following day, and its track listing was unveiled on August 10.

== Composition ==
The EP's second track and its title track was described as a house-based EDM dance-pop song. The fifth track, "Yum", is the Korean version of the lead single of Kep1er's first Japanese EP Against the World.

== Track listing ==
Track listing for Bubble Gum
No.	Title	Lyrics	Music	Arrangement	Length
1.	"Taste Better"	Beatie (Newtype); 1Take (Newtype)	1Take (Newtype); Beatie (Newtype)	1Take (Newtype); Beatie (Newtype)	1:02
2.	"Bubble Gum"	Lee Seu-ran; Kevin D (D_answer); Blue D (D_answer); Song Chae-ri (Artiffect); Chae Ji-hyo (Artiffect); Bay (153/Joombas); Choi Bo-ra (153/Joombas)	Alma Goodman; Alida Garpestad Peck; Godboy (Daniel Kim); Marc Sibley; Nathan Cunningham	Space Primates; Godboy	2:37
3.	"Don't Be Dumb"	KZ; Kim Tae-yeong; Dint; Charlotte Wilson; Isa Guerra; Coomo	KZ; Kim Tae-yeong; Dint; Charlotte Wilson; Isa Guerra	KZ; Kim Tae-yeong	2:42
4.	"Ice Tea"	Youra (Full8loom); Heido (MUMW); Jang Jeong-won (Jam Factory); Oh Min-joo (Jam Factory); Scott Russell Stoddart; JJean	Scott Russell Stoddart; JJean; Ryan S. Jhun	Scott Russell Stoddart; Ryan S. Jhun	3:16
5.	"Yum" (Korean version)	Seion; KZ; Nthonius; Meisobo; Dint; Coomo	KZ; Nthonius; Meisobo; Dint; Coomo	Nthonius; Meisobo	2:42
Total length:					12:19

== Charts ==
=== Weekly charts ===
Weekly chart performance for Bubble Gum
Chart (2025)	Peak position
Japanese Albums (Oricon)	46
Japanese Download Albums (Billboard Japan)	13
South Korean Albums (Circle)	3

=== Monthly charts ===
Monthly chart performance for Bubble Gum
Chart (2025)	Position
South Korean Albums (Circle)	8

== Release history ==
Release history and formats for Bubble Gum
Region	Date	Format	Label(s)
Various	August 19, 2025	Digital download; streaming	WakeOne; Klap
South Korea	August 19, 2025	CD; NFC	WakeOne
