= Lovestruck! =

- Digital cover

EP by Kep1er
- Released: April 10, 2023
- Genre: K-pop
- Length: 15:43
- Language: Korean
- Label: WakeOne; Swing

Kep1er chronology
Troubleshooter (2022)	Lovestruck! (2023)	Magic Hour (2023)

Singles from Lovestruck!
- 1. "Giddy" Released: April 10, 2023

Professional ratings
Review scores
Source	Rating
NME	3/5 stars

Lovestruck! is the fourth extended play by South Korean girl group Kep1er. It was released by WakeOne on April 10, 2023, and contains five tracks, including the lead single "Giddy".

== Background and release ==
On March 20, 2023, Wake One Entertainment announced that Kep1er would be releasing their fourth extended play titled Lovestruck! on April 10. Two days later, the promotional schedule was released. On March 23, the track listing was released with "Giddy" announced as the lead single. On March 31, the mood clip teaser video for "Giddy" was released.

== Track listing ==
Track listing for Lovestruck!
No.	Title	Lyrics	Music	Arrangement	Length
1.	"Giddy"	Hwang Yu-bin (Verygoods)	Stainboys (Room01); Alina Smith (Lyre); Annalise Morelli (Lyre); Gino Barletta; Justin Reinstein; Anna Timgren; Charlotte Wilson; JJean; Isa Guerra	Stainboys (Room01)	3:04
2.	"Lvly"	Danke; Liljune (153/Joombas); Zaya (153/Joombas)	Park Woo-sang; Sophia Brenan; Elle Campbell	Park Woo-sang	3:20
3.	"Back to the City"	JulY (Verygoods); Choi Ji-yoon (153/Joombas); Lee Su-jeong (Verygoods); Janey (MUMW)	Justin Reinstein; JJean	Justin Reinstein	3:20
4.	"Why"	Kim So-yoon	Park Soo-seok; Seo Ji-eun; Moon Kim (Room01)	Park Soo-seok; Seo Ji-eun	3:01
5.	"Happy Ending"	Park Woo-sang	Park Woo-sang; Livy	Park Woo-sang	2:58
Total length:					15:43

== Charts ==
=== Weekly charts ===
Weekly chart performance for Lovestruck!
Chart (2023)	Peak position
Japanese Albums (Oricon)	7
Japanese Combined Albums (Oricon)	7
Japanese Hot Albums (Billboard Japan)	29
South Korean Albums (Circle)	2

=== Monthly charts ===
Monthly chart performance for Lovestruck!
Chart (2023)	Peak position
Japanese Albums (Oricon)	14
South Korean Albums (Circle)	10

== Release history ==
Release history for Lovestruck!
Region	Date	Format	Label
South Korea	April 10, 2023	CD	WakeOne; Swing
Various	April 10, 2023	Digital download; streaming	WakeOne; Swing
