= Kep1going On =

- Digital cover

Studio album by Kep1er
- Released: June 3, 2024
- Genre: K-pop
- Length: 29:12
- Language: Korean
- Labels: WakeOne; Swing

Kep1er chronology
Kep1going (2024)	Kep1going On (2024)	Tipi-tap (2024)

Singles from Kep1going On
- 1. "Shooting Star" Released: June 3, 2024

Professional ratings
Review scores
Source	Rating
IZM	3/5 stars

Kep1going On is the first Korean studio album and second studio album overall by South Korean girl group Kep1er. It was released by WakeOne on June 3, 2024, and contains ten tracks, including the lead single "Shooting Star" and the Korean version of their Japanese singles "Grand Prix" and "Straight Line". This album marks the group's last release as a nine-member ensemble, with members Yeseo and Mashiro departing from the group in July 2024.

== Background ==
On February 13, 2024, WakeOne released a teaser image revealing plans for Kep1er to release a Japanese and Korean album within the year. Later that year, Kep1er released their Japanese album Kep1going on May 8.

On May 13, WakeOne officially announced Kep1er's first Korean studio album Kep1going On. The track listing was released on May 16, with "Shooting Star" announced as the album's lead single. Teasers for the music video of "Shooting Star" were released on May 30 and 31.

== Track listing ==
Track listing for Kep1going On
No.	Title	Lyrics	Music	Arrangement	Length
1.	"Last Carnival"	Park Woo-sang (Logos); Livy	Park Woo-sang (Logos); Kurtz (Logos); Livy	Park Woo-sang (Logos); Kurtz (Logos)	1:32
2.	"Shooting Star"	Kevin_D (D_answer); Im Su-ran; Lee Seu-ran; Dayeon	Kevin_D (D_answer); Ddank (D_answer); Zamun (D_answer); Livy	Kevin_D (D_answer); Ddank (D_answer); Zamun (D_answer)	3:03
3.	"Curious"	Lee Yi-jin; Mashiro	Geek Boy; Paulina "Pau" Cerrilla; Kyler Niko	Geek Boy	3:05
4.	"Flowers, Flutter, Your Heart"	Lee Aeng-du (153/Joombas)	C'SA; Saimon; RoseInPeace	Saimon; RoseInPeace	3:00
5.	"Double Up!"	Wkly	Melange (Inhouse); JJean; Ezit (Inhouse); Voll (Inhouse)	Melange (Inhouse); Ezit (Inhouse); Voll (Inhouse)	3:11
6.	"Push Button"	Neung So-hwa (Inhouse)	C-Young; JJean; Andy Love; Charlotte Wilson; Isa Guerra; Ebenezer; Blue.D (D_answer)	C-Young	3:18
7.	"Problem"	Charlie (153/Joombas)	Kevin_D (D_answer); Ddank (D_answer); Zamun (D_answer); Christian Fast; Julie Yu	Kevin_D (D_answer); Ddank (D_answer); Zamun (D_answer)	3:02
8.	"Dear Diary"	Jinli (Full8loom); Youra (Full8loom); Ayelle; Jamie Pascal Harper	Glory Face (Full8loom); Harry (Full8loom); Jinli (Full8loom); Youra (Full8loom); Ayelle; Jamie Pascal Harper; Hautboi Rich	Glory Face (Full8loom); Harry (Full8loom)	3:06
9.	"Grand Prix" (Korean version)	Minami	Geek Boy; Caroline Gustavsson; Kyler Niko	Geek Boy	3:06
10.	"Straight Line" (Korean version)	Ellie Love	Jung Hohyeon (E.one); JJean; Andy Love	Jung Hohyeon (E.one)	2:44
Total length:					29:12

== Charts ==
=== Weekly charts ===
Weekly chart performance for Kep1going On
Chart (2024)	Peak position
Japanese Albums (Oricon)	13
Japanese Combined Albums (Oricon)	17
Japanese Hot Albums (Billboard Japan)	39
South Korean Albums (Circle)	5

=== Monthly charts ===
Monthly chart performance for Kep1going On
Chart (2024)	Position
Japanese Albums (Oricon)	26
South Korean Albums (Circle)	16

== Release history ==
Release history and formats for Kep1going On
Region	Date	Format	Label
Various	June 3, 2024	Digital download; streaming	WakeOne; Swing
South Korea	June 3, 2024	CD	WakeOne; Swing
