= Magic Hour (EP) =

- Digital cover

EP by Kep1er
- Released: September 25, 2023
- Genre: K-pop
- Length: 14:53
- Language: Korean
- Labels: WakeOne; Swing

Kep1er chronology
Lovestruck! (2023)	Magic Hour (2023)	Kep1going (2024)

Singles from Magic Hour
- 1. "Galileo" Released: September 25, 2023

Magic Hour is the fifth extended play by South Korean girl group Kep1er. It was released by WakeOne on September 25, 2023, and contains five tracks, including the lead single "Galileo".

== Background ==
On August 4, 2023, it was reported that Kep1er would make a comeback in September, five months after their last release Lovestruck!. On August 29, Wake One Entertainment confirmed that Kep1er would be releasing their fifth extended play titled Magic Hour on September 25 through the release of a teaser poster. A day later, the comeback promotion schedule was released. On September 3, the track listing was released with "Galileo" announced as the lead single.

== Track listing ==
Track listing for Magic Hour
No.	Title	Lyrics	Music	Arrangement	Length
1.	"Galileo"	Seo Ji-eum	Yejune Synne (SNNNY); Josh Fountain; Lauren Aquilina; Marcus Andersson; Hero (SNNNY); Deeno (SNNNY)	SNNNY, Josh Fountain	3:08
2.	"The Door"	Jinli (Full8loom); Youra (Full8loom)	Johan Gustafsson; Teodor Dahlbom; Rebbi James	Johan Gustafsson; Teodor Dahlbom	3:01
3.	"Love on Lock"	Jo Yoon-kyung	JJean; Andy Love; E.one	E.one	2:51
4.	"Tropical Light" (Yujin, Xiaoting, Youngeun, Yeseo)	Imsuho; N!ko	Imsuho; N!ko; Naasim; Dr.Han	Naasim; Dr.Han	3:02
5.	"Tape" (Mashiro, Chaehyun, Dayeon, Hikaru, Huening Bahiyyih)	Skinner Box; Yang Seo-yeon (Jam Factory)	Morgan Connie Smith; Taneisha Jackson; E.one	E.one	2:51
Total length:					14:53

== Charts ==
=== Weekly charts ===
Weekly chart performance for Magic Hour
Chart (2023)	Peak position
Japanese Albums (Oricon)	7
Japanese Combined Albums (Oricon)	7
Japanese Hot Albums (Billboard Japan)	61
South Korean Albums (Circle)	3

=== Monthly charts ===
Monthly chart performance for Magic Hour
Chart (2023)	Position
Japanese Albums (Oricon)	23
South Korean Albums (Circle)	11

== Release history ==
Release history and formats for Magic Hour
Region	Date	Format	Label
South Korea	September 25, 2023	CD	WakeOne; Swing
Various	September 25, 2023	Digital download; streaming	WakeOne; Swing
