= Up! (Kep1er song) =

Single by Kep1er

from the EP Doublast
- Language: Korean; Japanese
- Released: June 20, 2022
- Genre: Funk; house
- Length: 3:12
- Label: WakeOne; Swing
- Composers: Glory Face (Full8loom); Jinli (Full8loom)
- Lyricist: Jinli (Full8loom)

Kep1er singles chronology
"Wa Da Da" (2022)	"Up!" (2022)	"Wing Wing" (2022)

Music video
- "Up!" on YouTube

"Up!" is a song recorded by South Korean girl group Kep1er for their second extended play (EP) Doublast. It was released as the EP's lead single by WakeOne on June 20, 2022.

== Background and release ==
On June 3, Wake One Entertainment announced Kep1er would be releasing their second extended play titled Doublast on June 20. On June 10, the track listing for Doublast was released with "Up!" announced as the lead single. Three days later, the highlight medley teaser video was released. The music video teaser was released on June 16 and 17.

== Composition ==
"Up!" was written by Jinli (Full8loom), who also handled the composition and arrangement alongside Glory Face (Full8loom). Musically, the song was described as a combination of funk and house genres "harmonized by energetic vocals that elevate the refreshing atmosphere of summer to the fullest" with lyrics about "Kep1er journey through a dream island called happiness". "Up!" was composed in the key of F-sharp major, with a tempo of 124 beats per minute.

== Commercial performance ==
"Up!" debuted at number 14 on South Korea's Gaon Download Chart in the chart issue dated June 19–25, 2022. In Japan, the song debuted at number 27 on the Billboard Japan Japan Hot 100 in the chart issue dated June 29, 2022; on its component charts, it debuted at number 34 on the Top Download Songs, and number 46 on the Top Streaming Songs. The song ascended to number 37 on the Top Streaming Songs in the following week. On the Oricon Combined Singles Chart, the song debuted at number 37 in the chart issue dated July 4, 2022, and ascending to number 36 in the following week. In Singapore, the song debuted at number 29 on the RIAS Top Streaming Chart in the chart issue dated June 24–30, 2022. It also debuted at number 28 on the RIAS Top Regional Chart in the chart issue dated June 17–23, 2022, ascending to number nine in the following week. Globally, the song debuted at number 167 on the Billboard Global Excl. U.S. in the chart issue dated July 9, 2022.

== Promotion ==
Prior to the release of Doublast, Kep1er held a live showcase on the same date to introduce the extended play where they performed "Up!". They subsequently performed on four music programs: Mnet's M Countdown on June 23, KBS's Music Bank on June 24, MBC's Show! Music Core on June 25, and SBS's Inkigayo on June 26. On the second week, they performed three music programs: SBS MTV's The Show on June 28, MBC M's Show Champion on June 29, M Countdown on June 30, Music Bank on July 1, where they won first place, Show! Music Core on July 2, and Inkigayo on July 3.

== Charts ==
Chart performance for "Up!"
Chart (2022)	Peak position
Global Excl. US (Billboard)	167
Japan (Japan Hot 100)	27
Japan Combined Singles (Oricon)	36
Singapore (RIAS)	29
South Korea Download (Gaon)	14

== Accolades ==
Music program awards for "Up!"
Program	Date	Ref.
Music Bank	July 1, 2022	

== Release history ==
Release history for "Up!"
Region	Date	Format	Label
Various	June 20, 2022	Digital download; streaming	WakeOne; Swing

== See also ==
- List of Music Bank Chart winners (2022)
