= Troubleshooter (EP) =

- Digital cover

EP by Kep1er
- Released: October 13, 2022
- Genre: K-pop
- Length: 16:14
- Language: Korean
- Label: WakeOne; Swing

Kep1er chronology
Doublast (2022)	Troubleshooter (2022)	Lovestruck! (2023)

Singles from Troubleshooter
- 1. "We Fresh" Released: October 13, 2022

Troubleshooter is the third extended play by South Korean girl group Kep1er. It was released by WakeOne on October 13, 2022, and contains five tracks, including the lead single "We Fresh".

== Background and release ==
On September 26, Wake One Entertainment announced Kep1er would be releasing their third extended play titled Troubleshooter on October 13. A day later, the promotional schedule was released. On September 28, the track listing was released with "We Fresh" announced as the lead single. On October 7, the highlight medley teaser video was released. A day later, the mood film teaser video was released. Music video teasers for "We Fresh" were released on October 11 and 12.

== Commercial performance ==
On the day of its release alone, the EP sold more than 167,000 copies, breaking Kep1er's own record of 153,000 first-day sales achieved with their second EP Doublast.

Troubleshooter debuted at number 2 on South Korea's Circle Album Chart in the chart issue dated October 10–15, with more than 240,000 copies sold, and number 21 on Billboard Japan's Hot 100 in the chart issue dated October 19.

== Promotion ==
Prior to the release of Troubleshooter, on October 10, 2022, the group held their first fan meeting called "2022 Kep1er Fan Meeting 'Kep1anet'" where they performed "Dreams".

== Track listing ==
Track listing for Troubleshooter
No.	Title	Lyrics	Music	Arrangement	Length
1.	"We Fresh"	KZ; B.O	KZ; Nthonius; Meisobo; B.O	Nthonius; Meisobo	3:15
2.	"Lion Tamer"	Bay (153/Joombas)	Daniel Kim; Frankie Day; Charlotte Wilson; The Hub 88	Daniel Kim	3:02
3.	"Downtown"	Mirror Boy (220Volt); D.Ham (220Volt); Moon Hanmiru (220Volt); Strongman; Boran	Mirror Boy (220Volt); D.Ham (220Volt); Moon Hanmiru (220Volt); Strongman; Boran	Mirror Boy (220Volt); D.Ham (220Volt); Moon Hanmiru (220Volt); Strongman	2:37
4.	"Dreams"	Jinli (Full8loom); Moon Yeon (Full8loom)	Glory Face (Full8loom); Harry (Full8loom); Jinli (Full8loom); Moon Yeon (Full8loom); Codename	Glory Face (Full8loom); Harry (Full8loom)	3:22
5.	"The Girls (Can't Turn Me Down)" (Remastered)	Jeong Ha-ri (153/Joombas); Wwwave (Papermaker)	Harold Philippon; Andy Love (THG/Sony)	Alawn (THG/Sony)	3:58
Total length:					16:14

== Charts ==
=== Weekly charts ===
Chart performance for Troubleshooter
Chart (2022)	Peak position
Croatian International Albums (HDU)	32
Japanese Albums (Oricon)	6
Japanese Combined Albums (Oricon)	7
Japanese Hot Albums (Billboard Japan)	21
South Korean Albums (Circle)	2

=== Monthly charts ===
Monthly chart performance for Troubleshooter
Chart (2022)	Peak position
Japanese Albums (Oricon)	14
South Korean Albums (Circle)	6

=== Year-end chart ===
Year-end chart performance for Troubleshooter
Chart (2022)	Peak position
South Korea Albums (Circle)	50

== Sales and certifications ==
Sales and certifications for Troubleshooter
Region	Certification	Certified units/sales
South Korea (KMCA)	Platinum	263,053

== Release history ==
Release history for Troubleshooter
Region	Date	Format	Label
South Korea	October 13, 2022	CD	WakeOne; Swing
Various	October 13, 2022	Digital download; streaming	WakeOne; Swing
