= We Fresh =

Single by Kep1er

from the EP Troubleshooter
- Language: Korean
- Released: October 13, 2022
- Genre: Dance
- Length: 3:15
- Label: WakeOne; Swing
- Composers: KZ; B.O; Nthonius; Meisobo
- Lyricists: KZ; B.O

Kep1er singles chronology
"Wing Wing" (2022)	"We Fresh" (2022)	"I Do! Do You?" (2023)

Music video
- "We Fresh" on YouTube

"We Fresh" is a song recorded by South Korean girl group Kep1er for their third extended play Troubleshooter. It was released as the EP's lead single by WakeOne on October 13, 2022.

== Background and release ==
On September 26, Wake One Entertainment announced Kep1er would be releasing their second extended play titled Troubleshooter on October 13. On September 28, the track listing was released with "We Fresh" announced as the lead single. On October 7, the highlight medley teaser video was released. The music video teasers were released on October 11 and 12. The song was released alongside the extended play and its music video on October 13.

== Composition ==
"We Fresh" was written and composed by KZ alongside B.O with Nthonius, and Meisobo participating in the composition and arrangement. It was described as a dance song with "up-tempo house beat characterized by rock guitar", with lyrics about "achieving anything even if there are difficulties if we are not afraid of challenging ourselves with healthy and bold energy". "We Fresh" was composed in the key of C-sharp major, with a tempo of 127 beats per minute.

== Music video ==
The music video directed by Naive Creative Production was released alongside the song by Wake One Entertainment on October 13. The "eccentric" music video starts off with "the members having breakfast together in an empty diner" before switching into "a futuristic cyberpunk" scenario.

== Promotion ==
Prior to the release of Troubleshooter, on October 13, 2022, the group held a live event to introduce the extended play and its songs, including "We Fresh", and to communicate with their fans. They subsequently performed on Mnet's M Countdown on the same day.

== Charts ==
Chart performance for "We Fresh"
Chart (2022)	Peak position
Japan Download (Billboard Japan)	76
South Korea Download (Circle)	38

== Release history ==
Release history for "We Fresh"
Region	Date	Format	Label
Various	October 13, 2022	Digital download; streaming	WakeOne; Swing
