= Doublast =

- Digital cover

EP by Kep1er
- Released: June 20, 2022
- Genre: Funk; house; minimal pop; moombahton; dance pop; R&B
- Length: 17:06
- Language: Korean
- Label: WakeOne; Swing

Kep1er chronology
| First Impact (2022) | Doublast (2022) | Troubleshooter (2022) |

Singles from Doublast
- 1. "Up!" Released: June 20, 2022

Professional ratings
Review scores
| Source | Rating |
|---|---|
| IZM | 2.5/5 stars |

Doublast is the second extended play by South Korean girl group Kep1er. The EP was released by WakeOne on June 20, 2022, and contains five tracks, including the lead single "Up!".

== Background and release ==
On June 3, Wake One Entertainment announced Kep1er would be releasing their second extended play titled Doublast on June 20. Four days later, the promotional schedule was released. On June 10, the track listing was released with "Up!" announced as the lead single. Three days later, the highlight medley teaser video was released. The music video teaser for lead single "Up!" was released on June 16 and 17.

== Composition ==
Doublast consists of five tracks and incorporates various genres of funk, house, minimal pop, moombahton, dance pop, and contemporary R&B.

== Promotion ==
Following the release of Doublast, Kep1er held a live showcase on the same date to introduce the extended play where they performed "Up!".

== Track listing ==
Track listing for Doublast
| No. | Title | Lyrics | Music | Arrangement | Length |
|---|---|---|---|---|---|
| 1. | "Up!" | Jinli (Full8loom) | Glory Face (Full8loom); Jinli (Full8loom) | Glory Face (Full8loom); Harry (Full8loom) | 3:12 |
| 2. | "Le Voya9e" | Whyminsu | Whyminsu | Whyminsu | 3:36 |
| 3. | "Attention" | Wwwave (PaperMaker) | Tenzo; Samuel Ku; Chloe Latimer; Pippa Glenn; Josh McClelland; Qudo (PaperMaker) | Tenzo; Samuel Ku; Qudo (PaperMaker) | 3:21 |
| 4. | "Good Night" | Jinli (Full8loom) | Glory Face (Full8loom); Jinli (Full8loom) | Glory Face (Full8loom); Yuka | 3:08 |
| 5. | "Rewind" | Lee Seu-ran | Moof (153/Joombas); JJ Evans (153/Joombas); Ashley Alisha (153/Joombas) | Moof (153/Joombas) | 3:49 |
| Total length: | | | | | 17:06 |

== Charts ==
=== Weekly charts ===
Chart performance for Doublast
| Chart (2022) | Peak position |
|---|---|
| Finnish Physical Albums (Suomen virallinen lista) | 7 |
| Japanese Albums (Oricon) | 9 |
| Japanese Hot Albums (Billboard Japan) | 24 |
| South Korean Albums (Gaon) | 2 |

=== Monthly charts ===
Monthly chart performance for Doublast
| Chart (2022) | Peak position |
|---|---|
| Japanese Albums (Oricon) | 28 |
| South Korean Albums (Circle) | 4 |

=== Year-end chart ===
Year-end chart performance for Doublast
| Chart (2022) | Peak position |
|---|---|
| South Korea Albums (Circle) | 43 |

== Release history ==
Release history for Doublast
| Region | Date | Format | Label |
|---|---|---|---|
| South Korea | June 20, 2022 | CD | WakeOne; Swing |
| Various | June 20, 2022 | Digital download; streaming | WakeOne; Swing |
