= Wing Wing =

2022 single by Kep1er

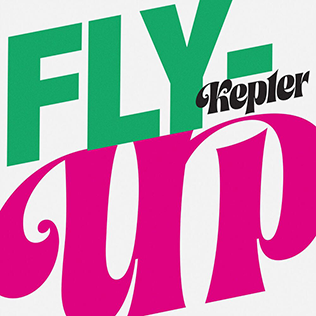
- Digital cover

Single by Kep1er
- Language: Japanese
- B-side: "Daisy"; "Up!" (Japanese version)
- Released: September 7, 2022
- Genre: J-pop
- Length: 3:15
- Label: WakeOne; Ariola Japan
- Composers: B.O; KZ; Nthonius; Meisobo
- Lyricists: KZ; B.O

Kep1er singles chronology
"Up!" (2022)	"Wing Wing" (2022)	"We Fresh" (2022)

Kep1er Japanese singles chronology
"Wing Wing" (2022)	"I Do! Do You?" (2023)

Music video
- "Wing Wing" on YouTube

"Wing Wing" is a song recorded by South Korean girl group Kep1er for their first Japanese maxi single marketed as "Fly-Up". It was pre-released as a digital single on August 3, 2022, and as a CD single featuring three other tracks on September 7, 2022, by WakeOne and Ariola Japan.

== Background and release ==
On July 21, 2022, Wake One Entertainment announced Kep1er would be releasing their Japanese debut maxi single titled "Fly-Up" on September 7. The maxi single features four tracks including "Wing Wing". "Wing Wing" was pre-released alongside its music video on August 3. The maxi single was released on September 7.

== Composition ==
"Wing Wing" was written and composed by KZ, and B.O with Nthonius, and Meisobo participating in the composition. "Wing Wing" was composed in the key of B minor, with a tempo of 128 beats per minute.

== Commercial performance ==
"Wing Wing" debuted at number three on the Billboard Japan Hot 100 in the chart issue dated September 14, 2022; on its component charts, the song debuted at number 40 on the Top Download Songs. It also debuted at number two on the Billboard Japan Top Single Sales in the chart issue dated September 14, 2022. The song debuted at number two on the Oricon Singles Chart, and number two on the Oricon Combined Chart in the chart issue dated September 19, 2022.

== Promotion ==
Following the release of the "Fly-Up", on September 10 and 11, Kep1er held a live event called "Kep1er Japan Debut Showcase LIVE <Fly-Up>" to introduce the maxi single and communicate with their fans. The group also performed the song on CDTV! Live Live and Venue101 on September 3 and 5.

== Track listing ==
CD single / digital download
No.	Title	Lyrics	Music	Length
1.	"Wing Wing"	KZ; B.O	KZ; B.O; Nthonius; Meisobo	3:15
2.	"Daisy"	Tsingtao; Aaron Kim	Ejae; Nicole "Kole" Cohen; Isaac Han; Aaron Kim; Ghostchild Ltd; Ashe Ahn	2:57
3.	"Up!" (Japanese version)	Glory Face (Full8loom); Jinli (Full8loom)	Glory Face (Full8loom); Jinli (Full8loom)	3:12
4.	"Wa Da Da" (Japanese version)	BuildingOwner (PrismFilter); Elum (PrismFilter); Shannon; Danke; Hwang Yu-bin (XYXX); Odal Park; Lee Seu-ran; Kako; Elley; Ryo Ito	BuildingOwner (PrismFilter); Elum (PrismFilter); Shannon	3:04
Total length:				12:28

CD single – Kep1ian edition
No.	Title	Lyrics	Music	Length
1.	"Wing Wing"	KZ; B.O	KZ; B.O; Nthonius; Meisobo	3:15
2.	"Up!" (Japanese version)	Glory Face (Full8loom); Jinli (Full8loom)	Glory Face (Full8loom); Jinli (Full8loom)	3:12
3.	"Wa Da Da" (Japanese version)	BuildingOwner (PrismFilter); Elum (PrismFilter); Shannon; Danke; Hwang Yu-bin (XYXX); Odal Park; Lee Seu-ran; Kako; Elley; Ryo Ito	BuildingOwner (PrismFilter); Elum (PrismFilter); Shannon	3:04
4.	"O.O.O (Over&Over&Over)"	Jeong Ho-hyeon (E.one); Hwang Hyun-hyeon (MonoTree); Girls Planet 999	Jeong Ho-hyeon (E.one); Hwang Hyun-hyeon (MonoTree)	4:07
Total length:				13:38

== Charts ==
=== Weekly charts ===
Weekly chart performance for "Wing Wing"
Chart (2022)	Peak position
Japan (Japan Hot 100)	3
Japan (Oricon)	2
Japan Combined Singles (Oricon)	2

=== Monthly charts ===
Monthly chart performance for "Wing Wing"
Chart (2022)	Position
Japan (Oricon)	6

=== Year-end charts ===
Year-end chart performance for "Wing Wing"
Chart (2022)	Position
Japan Top Singles Sales (Billboard Japan)	64
Japan (Oricon)	60

== Certifications ==
Certifications for "Wing Wing"
Region	Certification	Certified units/sales
Japan (RIAJ)	Gold	100,000^{^}
^{^} Shipments figures based on certification alone.

== Release history ==
Release history for "Wing Wing"
Region	Date	Format	Label
Japan	September 7, 2022	CD; DVD	WakeOne; Ariola Japan
Various	September 7, 2022	Digital download; streaming	WakeOne; Ariola Japan
