= I Do! Do You? =

- Digital cover

Single by Kep1er
- Language: Japanese
- B-side: "Together Forever"; "We Fresh" (Japanese version)
- Released: March 15, 2023
- Genre: Dance
- Length: 3:35
- Label: WakeOne; Ariola Japan
- Composers: Jonatan Gusmark; Emily Yeonseo Kim; Moa "Cazzi Opeia" Carlebecker; Ellen Berg; Moonshine
- Lyricists: Tsingtao; Ryo Ito

Kep1er singles chronology
| "We Fresh" (2022) | "I Do! Do You?" (2023) | "Giddy" (2023) |

Kep1er Japanese singles chronology
| "Wing Wing" (2022) | "I Do! Do You?" (2023) | "Grand Prix" (2023) |

Music video
- "I Do! Do You?" on YouTube

"I Do! Do You?" is a song recorded by South Korean girl group Kep1er for their second Japanese maxi single marketed as "Fly-By". It was pre-released as a digital single on February 21, 2023, and as a CD single featuring three (Note: The digital edition features four other tracks.) other tracks on March 15, 2023, by WakeOne and Ariola Japan.

== Background and release ==
On January 16, 2023, Wake One Entertainment announced Kep1er would be releasing their second Japanese maxi single titled "Fly-By" on March 15. The maxi single features four tracks including "I Do! Do You?". "I Do! Do You?" was pre-released alongside its music video on February 21. The maxi single was released on March 15.

== Composition ==
"I Do! Do You?" was written by Tsingtao, and Ryo Ito, and composed by Jonatan Gusmark, Emily Yeonseo Kim, Moa "Cazzi Opeia" Carlebecker, Ellen Berg, and Moonshine. It was described as a "uptempo" dance song characterized by "funky disco rhythm" with lyrics about "[Kep1er]' members subtle feelings about the person they like and their growing feelings". "I Do! Do You?" was composed in the key of C major, with a tempo of 120 beats per minute.

== Commercial performance ==
"I Do! Do You? debuted at number three on the Billboard Japan Hot 100 in the chart issue dated March 22, 2023; on its component charts, the song debuted at number 86 on the Top Download Songs. The song debuted at number three on the Oricon Singles Chart, and the Oricon Combined Chart in the chart issue dated March 27, 2023.

== Promotion ==
Prior to the release of "Fly-By", on March 6, 2023, Kep1er performed the song on CDTV! Live Live.

== Track listing ==
Digital download
| No. | Title | Lyrics | Music | Length |
|---|---|---|---|---|
| 1. | "I Do! Do You?" | Tsingtao; Ryo Ito | Jonatan Gusmark; Emily Yeonseo Kim; Moa "Cazzi Opeia" Carlebecker; Ellen Berg; Moonshine | 3:35 |
| 2. | "Together Forever" | Jinli (Full8loom); Minami | Gloryface (Full8loom); Kim Ga-yeong | 3:32 |
| 3. | "We Fresh" (Japanese version) | KZ; B.O | KZ; Nthonius; Meisobo; B.O | 3:16 |
| 4. | "MVSK" (Japanese version) | Jeong Ho-hyeon (E.one) | Jeong Ho-hyeon (E.one) | 3:11 |
| 5. | "Wa Da Da" (Japanese version; Imlay remix) | BuildingOwner (PrismFilter); Elum (PrismFilter); Shannon; Danke; Hwang Yu-bin (XYXX); Odal Park; Lee Seu-ran; Kako; Elley; Ryo Ito | BuildingOwner (PrismFilter); Elum (PrismFilter); Shannon | 3:16 |
| Total length: | | | | 16:50 |

CD single – standard edition
| No. | Title | Length |
|---|---|---|
| 1. | "I Do! Do You?" | 3:35 |
| 2. | "We Fresh" (Japanese version) | 3:16 |
| 3. | "Wa Da Da" (Japanese version; Imlay remix) | 3:16 |
| 4. | "I Do! Do You?" (Inst.) | 3:35 |
| Total length: | | 13:42 |

CD single – limited edition
| No. | Title | Length |
|---|---|---|
| 1. | "I Do! Do You?" | 3:35 |
| 2. | "Together Forever" | 3:32 |
| 3. | "We Fresh" (Japanese version) | 3:16 |
| 4. | "MVSK" (Japanese version) | 3:11 |
| Total length: | | 13:34 |

CD single – Kep1ian edition
| No. | Title | Length |
|---|---|---|
| 1. | "I Do! Do You?" | 3:35 |
| 2. | "We Fresh" (Japanese version) | 3:16 |
| 3. | "MVSK" (Japanese version) | 3:16 |
| 4. | "I Do! Do You?" (Inst.) | 3:35 |
| Total length: | | 13:42 |

== Charts ==
=== Weekly charts ===
Weekly chart performance for "I Do! Do You?"
| Chart (2023) | Peak position |
|---|---|
| Japan (Japan Hot 100) | 3 |
| Japan (Oricon) | 3 |
| Japan Combined Singles (Oricon) | 3 |

=== Monthly charts ===
Monthly chart performance for "I Do! Do You?"
| Chart (2023) | Position |
|---|---|
| Japan (Oricon) | 10 |

=== Year-end charts ===
Year-end chart performance for "I Do! Do You?"
| Chart (2023) | Position |
|---|---|
| Japan Top Singles Sales (Billboard Japan) | 69 |
| Japan (Oricon) | 82 |

== Certifications ==
Certifications for "I Do! Do You?"
| Region | Certification | Certified units/sales |
|---|---|---|
| Japan (RIAJ) | Gold | 100,000^{^} |
^{^} Shipments figures based on certification alone.

== Release history ==
Release history for "I Do! Do You?"
| Region | Date | Format | Label |
|---|---|---|---|
| Japan | March 15, 2023 | CD | WakeOne; Ariola Japan |
| Various | March 15, 2023 | Digital download; streaming | WakeOne; Ariola Japan |
