= I'm So Hot =

2019 single by Momoland

Single by Momoland

from the EP Show Me
- Language: Korean; Japanese
- B-side: "Curious"
- Released: March 20, 2019
- Recorded: 2019
- Genre: Electropop; electro swing
- Length: 3:20
- Label: MLD Entertainment; Kakao M (South Korea); King Records (Japan)
- Songwriters: Shinsadong Tiger; Beom x Nang
- Producer: Shinsadong Tiger

Momoland singles chronology
"Baam" (2018)	"I'm So Hot" (2019)	"Pinky Love" (2019)

Japanese CD single cover

Music video
- "I'm So Hot" on YouTube

"I'm So Hot" is a song recorded by South Korean girl group Momoland. It was released on March 20, 2019, by MLD Entertainment and distributed by Kakao M as the lead single from the group's fifth extended play Show Me. The Japanese version of the song was released as a CD single by King Records on May 7, 2019. The track was written by Shinsadong Tiger and Beom x Nang, with Shinsadong Tiger credited as the producer.

The accompanying music video for the song was uploaded onto 1theK's YouTube channel simultaneously with the single's release. To promote the single, the group performed on several South Korean music show programs, such as M Countdown and Inkigayo. Commercially, "I'm So Hot" peaked at number eighty-one on South Korea's Gaon Digital Chart.

== Composition ==
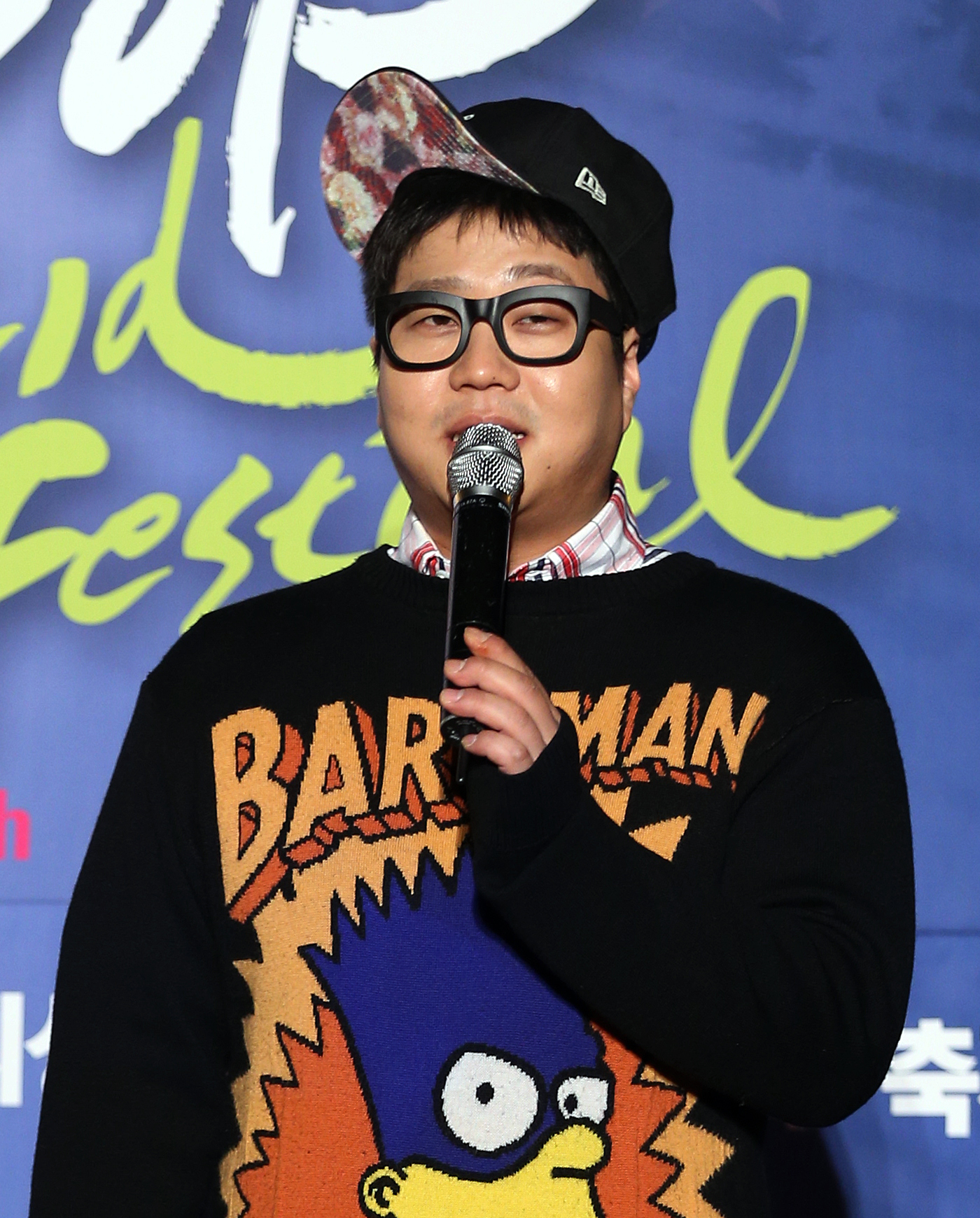
Shinsadong Tiger composer and lyricist of "I'm So Hot" (pictured in 2013).

"I'm so Hot is an electropop song. The song was written, composed and produced by Shinsadong Tiger, while Beom x Nang received writing and composition credits. Described by Tamar Herman of Billboard as a song that "jumps between melodies, throwing in jazzy brass and quirky synths over squelchy Eurodance-inspired beats."

== Background and release ==
Momoland released their fourth extended play Fun to the World with its lead single "Baam" in June 2018. Following the release of "Baam", it was announced on February 12, 2019, by MLD Entertainment that the group would be returning in March 2019 with a new album. On March 14, 2019, it was announced that members Daisy and Taeha will be taking a break due to health and personal issues and not participate for the promotions of "I'm So Hot".

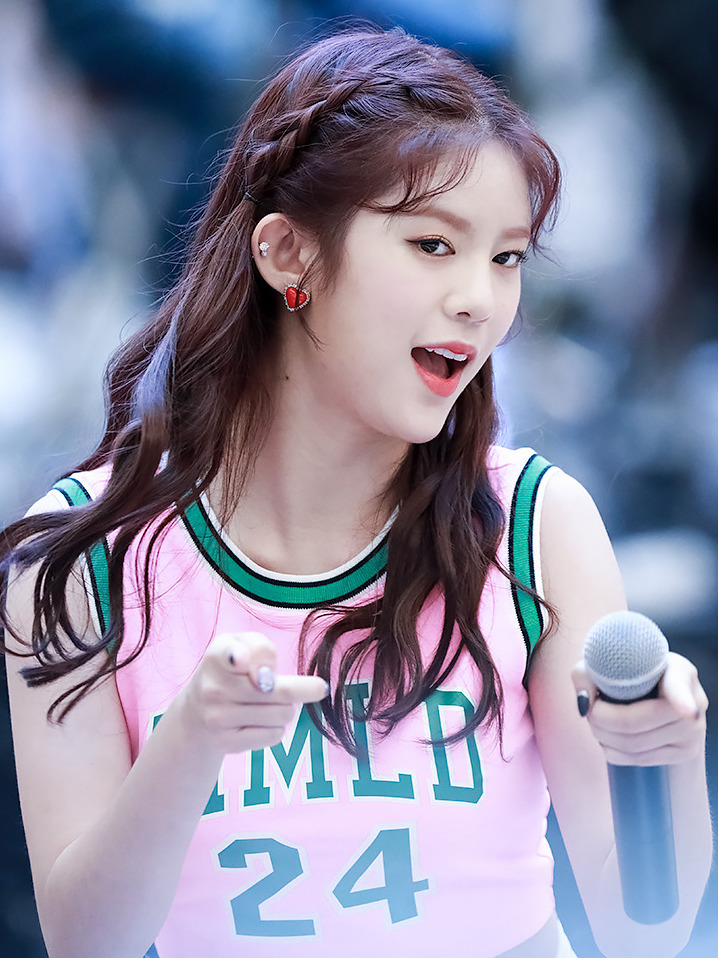
"I'm So Hot" serves as the group's first single since 2016 not to feature Daisy (pictured in 2018).

"I'm So Hot" served as the first single from Momoland without members Daisy and Taeha since their 2016 debut single "Jjan! Koong! Kwang!". Prior to the release of the song, teasers featuring photos of Momoland from the extended play's photoshoot, a snippet of the song and clips from its music video were released online in March 2019. The song was officially released on March 20, 2019, by MLD Entertainment and distributed by Kakao M as the group's sixth single. It served as the lead single of their fifth extended play, Show Me. An instrumental of the song was included in the extended play as the sixth track. The dance practice video was uploaded on March 25, 2019.

The Japanese version was released on May 7, 2019. It was included in the 2019 release of the group's debut studio album, Chiri Chiri.

In January 2020, MLD Entertainment said they decided to exclude Daisy from promotions of "I'm So Hot" in March 2019, after not receiving a "clear" response from Daisy regarding her duties in the group at the time.

== Critical reception ==
Tássia Assis of MTV News stated the track's "brassy, over the top melody pairs well with the flashy confidence and it's the perfect score to play while taking over the stage." Amber Miley of The Kraze Magazine described the song as "full brass and percussion", and that it was "reminiscent of old school burlesque show music."

== Commercial performance ==
In South Korea, "I'm So Hot" debuted in the Gaon Digital Chart at number one hundred nine on the week of March 23, 2019, making it the third song from Momoland to enter the chart. The song peaked at number eighty-one during its second week on the week of March 30, 2019.

In Japan, the Japanese version of "I'm So Hot" peaked at number eight on the Oricon Singles Chart.

== Music videos ==
A scene in the music video where Momoland's Yeonwoo appearing in a fitting room playing around with a wig.

The music video for "I'm So Hot" was uploaded to 1theK's official YouTube channel on March 20, 2019, in conjunction with the release of the single. The video features the group playing around in fitting rooms in between dancing scenes. Other scenes feature the group in a school bus and a dimly-lit hallway.

The music video for the Japanese version of the song was uploaded to J-Rock's official YouTube channel on March 31, 2019.

== Live performances ==
Momoland promoted "I'm So Hot" by performing on several music programs in South Korea including Inkigayo, M Countdown, Music Bank, The Show, Show Champion and Show! Music Core.

== Track listing ==
Digital download / streaming
No.	Title	Lyrics	Music	Arrangement	Length
1.	"I'm So Hot"	Shinsadong Tiger; Beom x Nang	Shinsadong Tiger; Beom x Nang	Shinsadong Tiger	3:20

I'm So Hot - Japanese EP
No.	Title	Lyrics	Music	Length
1.	"I'm So Hot" (Japanese version)	Shinsadong Tiger; Beom x Nang	Shinsadong Tiger; Beom x Nang	3:20
2.	"Curious" (Japanese version)	Monster Factory; ATM	Monster Factory	3:15
3.	"I'm So Hot" (Japanese version instrumental)		Shinsadong Tiger; Beom x Nang	3:20
4.	"Curious" (Japanese version instrumental)		Monster Factory	3:15
Total length:				13:10

== Charts ==
Chart performance for "I'm So Hot"
Chart (2019)	Peak position
Japan (Billboard Japan Hot 100)	51
Japan (Oricon Singles Chart)	8
South Korea (Gaon Digital Chart)	81
South Korea (K-pop Hot 100)	36
US World Digital Songs (Billboard)	13

== Accolades ==
=== Music program awards ===
Music program awards for "I'm So Hot"
Program	Network	Date	Ref.
The Show	SBS MTV	March 26, 2019	
The Show	SBS MTV	April 2, 2019	
Show Champion	MBC M	April 3, 2019	

== Credits and personnel ==
Credits adapted from Melon.

- Momoland – vocals
- Beom x Nang – composer, lyricist
- Shinsadong Tiger – composer, lyricist, arrangement

== Release history ==
Release dates and formats for "I'm So Hot"
Version	Region	Date	Format	Label
Korean	Worldwide	March 20, 2019	Digital download; streaming	MLD Entertainment; Kakao M
Japanese	Worldwide	May 7, 2019	CD single; digital download; streaming	King
