= Kep1er =

South Korean girl group

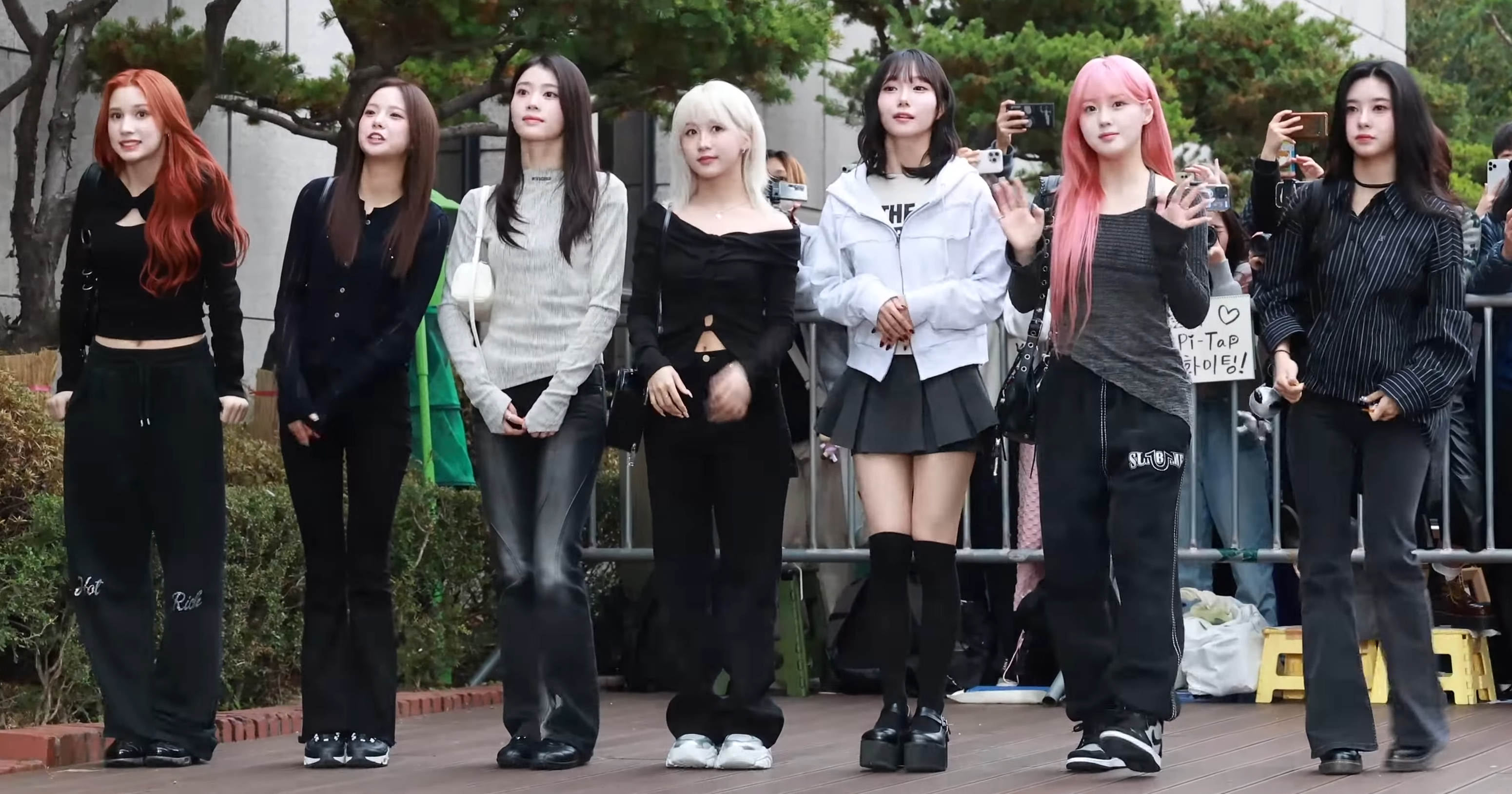
- Kep1er in November 2024; L–R: Huening Bahiyyih, Choi Yu-jin, Shen Xiaoting, Ezaki Hikaru, Seo Young-eun (former), Kim Chae-hyun, and Kim Da-yeon

Background information
- Origin: Seoul, South Korea
- Genres: K-pop; J-pop
- Years active: 2022–present
- Labels: WakeOne; Klap; Ariola Japan; Swing
- Members: Choi Yu-jin; Shen Xiaoting; Kim Chae-hyun; Kim Da-yeon; Ezaki Hikaru; Huening Bahiyyih
- Past members: Sakamoto Mashiro; Kang Ye-seo; Seo Young-eun
- Website: wake-one.com/artists/kep1er

Kep1er (/ˈkɛplər/; Korean: 케플러) is a South Korean girl group formed by CJ ENM through the Mnet reality competition show Girls Planet 999 in 2021. The group consists of six members: Kim Chae-hyun, Huening Bahiyyih, Choi Yu-jin, Kim Da-yeon, Ezaki Hikaru, and Shen Xiaoting. Kep1er was originally a nine-piece ensemble; former members Kang Ye-seo and Sakamoto Mashiro departed from the group in July 2024, and Seo Young-eun departed in March 2026.

The group debuted on January 3, 2022, under the co-management of WakeOne and Swing Entertainment with their first extended play (EP) First Impact. Upon its release, the group received immediate commercial success, selling approximately 400,000 copies and peaking at number 1 on South Korea's Gaon Album Chart. In addition, both the EP and its lead single "Wa Da Da" charted on the Billboard Global 200 and World Digital Songs respectively. The early success subsequently hailed them as the New Wave of the Year at several awards ceremonies, including Asia Artist Awards and Seoul Music Awards.

The group's Japanese debut single, "Fly-Up", was released on September 7, 2022, under the Sony Music Entertainment Japan subsidiary Ariola Japan. Debuting at number two on Oricon Singles Chart and with over 100,000 unit sales, the single was certified gold by the Recording Industry Association of Japan (RIAJ).

Since September 30, 2024, as part of the label reorganization of Swing Entertainment, Klap Entertainment has been co-managing the group alongside WakeOne.

== Name ==
Kep1er's official logo.

"Kep1er" was a name suggested by viewers of Girls Planet 999 through the website Naver. The name is a reference to the planets in the Kepler star systems named after the 16th century astronomer Johannes Kepler.

== History ==
=== Formation through Girls Planet 999 and other activities ===
Kep1er was formed through the Mnet reality survival show Girls Planet 999, which aired from August 6 to October 22, 2021. The show brought 99 contestants from China, Japan, and South Korea to compete to debut in a multinational girl group. Out of initially 99 contestants, only the top nine would make the final lineup.

Before the show began, several group members had already been active in the entertainment industry. Choi Yu-jin made her debut in the Cube Entertainment girl group CLC on March 19, 2015, with the group's extended play (EP) First Love; she was on hiatus from CLC due to activities with Kep1er until their disbandment. In 2010, Kang Ye-seo was a member of the girl group CutieL before joining Busters from 2019 to 2020.

Kim Da-yeon participated in Produce 48 in 2018, representing CNC Entertainment, while Shen Xiaoting participated in Produce Camp 2020, representing Top Class Entertainment. Both were eliminated in the first round, placing 70th and 80th in their respective shows. Mashiro Sakamoto, a trainee at JYP Entertainment from 2016 to 2018, appeared in the first episode of the Mnet reality survival show Stray Kids as part of the female trainee team, but did not progress past the first episode. Following Produce 48, Da-yeon left CNC Entertainment and signed with Stardium Entertainment, only to leave once more after her debut plans fell through. Xiaoting was a competitive ballroom and modern dancer, having won a gold medal in a modern dance sport competition in Shanghai, as well as ranking sixth globally in a British competition.

=== 2021–2022: Debut with First Impact, Queendom 2 ===
Kep1er was originally scheduled to debut on December 14, 2021, with pre-orders for their EP First Impact having begun on November 29. They were also initially scheduled to perform at the 2021 Mnet Asian Music Awards on December 11. However, it was announced that the group's scheduled debut had been delayed to January 3, 2022, after one of their staff members tested positive for COVID-19. Their performance at the 2021 Mnet Asian Music Awards was also cancelled. On December 14, it was revealed that group members Mashiro and Xiaoting tested positive for COVID-19 and were announced to have fully recovered on December 26.

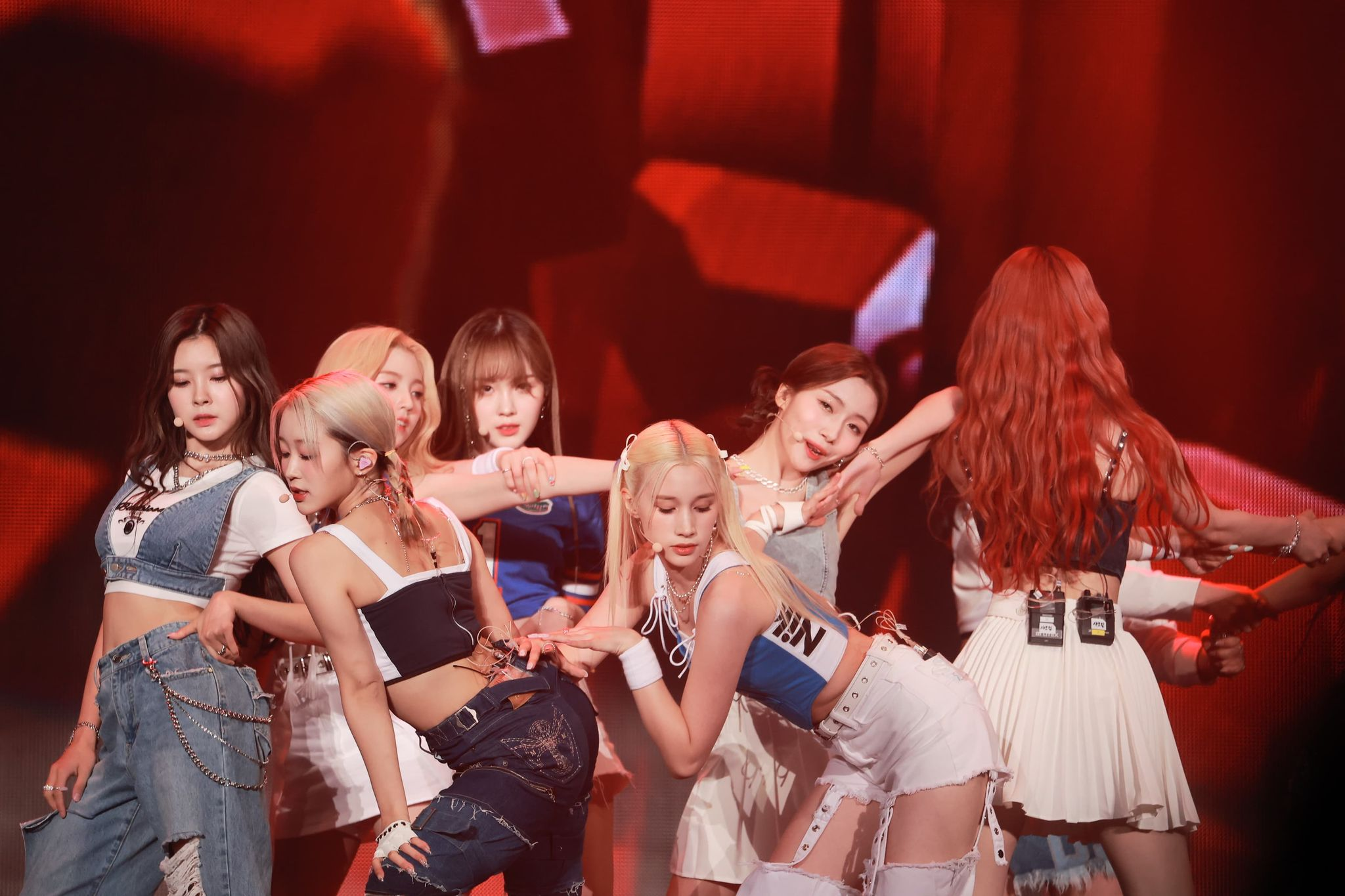
Kep1er in July 2022

On January 3, 2022, Kep1er released their debut EP First Impact, with "Wa Da Da" serving as lead single. On January 10, Chaehyun was announced as the new co-host for SBS MTV's music program The Show alongside Ateez's Yeosang and Cravity's Minhee. On January 13, Kep1er won their first music program award on M Countdown with "Wa Da Da". On February 21, 2022, it was confirmed that Kep1er will participate in the second season of the Mnet reality competition show Queendom, scheduled to premiere in March 2022. On June 20, Kep1er released their second EP Doublast, with "Up!" serving as the lead single. On August 3, Kep1er released their first Japanese single Fly-Up, featuring "Wing Wing" as lead track. It was released on September 7, 2022. On September 23, Kep1er released the promotional single "Sugar Rush" through Universe Music. On October 13, Kep1er released their third EP Troubleshooter, with "We Fresh" serving as the lead single.

=== 2023–2024: Japan tours, first studio album, and contract renewal discussions ===
On February 14, 2023, WakeOne and Swing Entertainment announced the dates for Kep1er Japan Concert Tour 2023 'Fly-By', which were held in Aichi and Hyogo, the first time that the group held a Japanese arena tour since their debut. On March 15, Kep1er released their second Japanese single Fly-By, with "I Do! Do You?" as the lead track. On April 10, The group released their fourth EP Lovestruck!, with "Giddy" as the lead single. Kep1er successfully carried out their concert tour by performing in Tokyo at Yoyogi National Stadium on May 20–21, Aichi Sky Expo on June 2–3 and at Kobe World Memorial Hall in Kobe on June 10–11. On July 6, Kep1er released the promotional single "Rescue Tayo" in collaboration with the YouTube children animation channel Tayo the Little Bus. On September 25, the group released their fifth EP Magic Hour, with "Galileo" as the lead single. On November 22, the group released their third Japanese single Fly-High, with "Grand Prix" as the lead track.

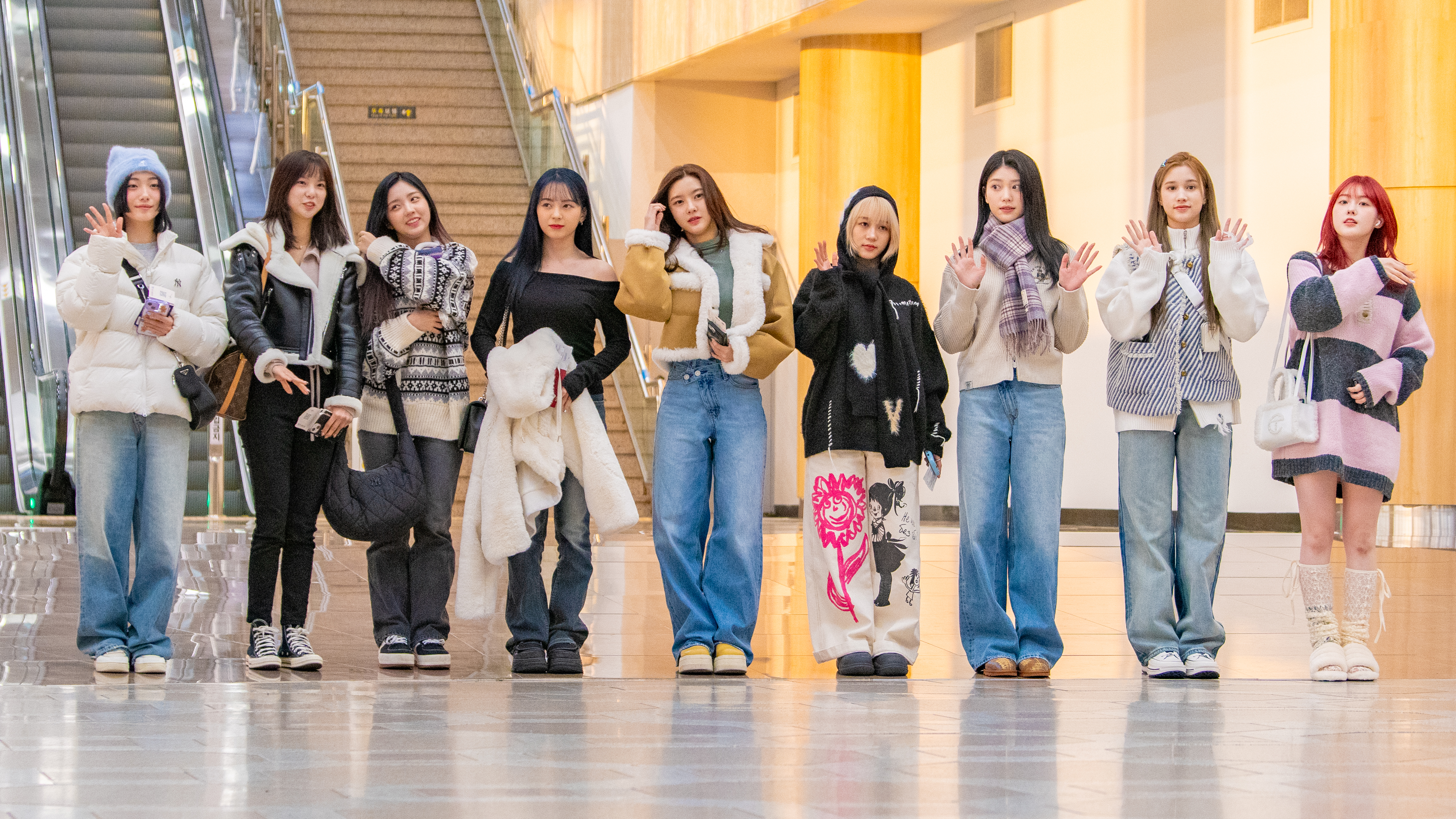
Kep1er in November 2023

In 2024, Kep1er held their second Japanese concert tour titled Kep1er Japan Concert Tour 2024 'Fly-High' in Chiba at the Makuhari Event Hall on February 23–24, and in Kobe at the Kobe World Memorial Hall on March 2–3. On February 14, WakeOne and Swing Entertainment announced that the group's first Japanese studio album Kep1going would be released on May 8. Its title track "Straight Line" was released on April 23. On May 13, it was announced that Kep1er would be releasing their first Korean studio album Kep1going On on June 3 with the title track "Shooting Star" The song was listed on Dazed's "The 50 best K-pop tracks of 2024" and Billboard's "The 25 Best K-Pop Songs of 2024".

In September 2023, it was reported that WakeOne was discussing the extension of the group's contract with the members' respective agencies beyond the initial two years and six months contract, which if unsuccessful would have led to the group's disbandment in mid-2024. By January 2024, discussion on renewal of the group members' contracts was reported to still be ongoing. The group's contract was set to expire in July of the same year. On May 30, WakeOne announced that all members of Kep1er, except Mashiro and Yeseo, renewed their contracts. Mashiro and Yeseo departed from the group after the group's concerts in Yokohama, Japan on July 15.

=== 2024–present: Line-up changes ===
On September 30, 2024, Kep1er signed with Klap Entertainment, which co-manages the group along with WakeOne. On November 1, Kep1er released their sixth EP Tipi-tap, their first release as a seven-member ensemble.

On April 30, 2025, Kep1er released their first Japanese EP, Against the World. On August 19, they released their seventh Korean EP Bubble Gum.

On March 6, 2026, Klap announced member Seo Young-eun's departure from the group. Prior to her departure, Seo had been inactive from the group since July 2025. Kep1er released their eighth Korean EP Crack Code on March 31, which was their first release after Seo's departure from the group. Member Shen Xiaoting made her solo debut on July 30, with the single "Legend".

== Endorsements ==
On February 15, 2022, Kep1er became models for South Korean cosmetics brand S2ND.

== Members ==
=== Current ===
- Choi Yu-jin (최유진) – leader
- Shen Xiaoting (沈小婷; 션샤오팅)
- Kim Chae-hyun (김채현)
- Kim Da-yeon (김다연)
- Ezaki Hikaru (江崎ひかる; 에자키 히카루)
- Huening Bahiyyih (휴닝바히에)

=== Former ===
- Sakamoto Mashiro (坂本舞白; 사카모토 마시로; 2022–2024) (Note: Sakamoto Mashiro served as the co-leader of the group before her departure.)
- Kang Ye-seo (강예서; 2022–2024)
- Seo Young-eun (서영은; 2022–2026)

== Discography ==
Korean albums

- Kep1going On (2024)

Japanese albums

- Kep1going (2024)

== Concerts and tours ==
=== Kep1er Japan Concert Tour 2023 'Fly-By' ===
Date	City	Country	Venue	Attendance	Ref.
May 20, 2023	Tokyo	Japan	Yoyogi National Stadium	50,000	
May 21, 2023	Tokyo	Japan	Yoyogi National Stadium	50,000	
June 2, 2023	Aichi	Japan	Aichi Sky Expo	50,000	
June 3, 2023	Aichi	Japan	Aichi Sky Expo	50,000	
June 10, 2023	Kobe	Japan	World Memorial Hall	50,000	

=== Kep1er Japan Concert Tour 2024 'Fly-High' ===
Date	City	Country	Venue	Attendance	Ref.
February 23, 2024	Chiba	Japan	Makuhari Event Hall	30,000	
February 24, 2024	Chiba	Japan	Makuhari Event Hall	30,000	
February 25, 2024	Chiba	Japan	Makuhari Event Hall	30,000	
March 2, 2024	Kobe	Japan	World Memorial Hall	30,000	
March 3, 2024	Kobe	Japan	World Memorial Hall	30,000	

=== Kep1er Japan Concert 2024 'Kep1going' ===
Date	City	Country	Venue	Attendance	Ref.
July 13, 2024	Yokohama	Japan	K-Arena Yokohama	45,000	
July 14, 2024	Yokohama	Japan	K-Arena Yokohama	45,000	
July 15, 2024	Yokohama	Japan	K-Arena Yokohama	45,000	

=== 2025 Kep1er Concert Tour 'Into the Orbit: Kep1asia' ===
Date	City	Country	Venue	Ref.
September 20, 2025	Seoul	South Korea	Yonsei University	
September 21, 2025	Seoul	South Korea	Yonsei University	
October 3, 2025	Fukuoka	Japan	Fukuoka Civic Hall	
October 10, 2025	Tokyo	Japan	Tokyo Garden Theater	
October 11, 2025	Tokyo	Japan	Tokyo Garden Theater	
December 6, 2025	Hong Kong		AXA Dreamland	
December 12, 2025	Kyoto	Japan	Rohm Theatre Kyoto	
December 14, 2025	Kyoto	Japan	Rohm Theatre Kyoto	
December 20, 2025	Taipei	Taiwan	NTU Sports Center	

== Videography ==
=== Music videos ===
List of songs, showing year released, name of the directors, and the length of the music videos
Title	Year	Director(s)	Length	Ref.
"Wa Da Da"	2022	Bang Jae-yeob	3:18	
"Up!"	2022	Hiijack	3:18	
"Wing Wing"	2022	Naive Creative Production	3:23	
"Sugar Rush"	2022	Naive Creative Production	3:34	
"We Fresh"	2022	Naive Creative Production	3:44	
"I Do! Do You?"	2023	Ko Joo-yeong	4:00	
"Giddy"	2023	Bart (Flipevil)	3:15	
"Rescue Tayo"	2023	OHSKA	2:34	
"Galileo"	2023	Hong Jaehwan / Lee Hyesu (Swisher)	3:32	
"Grand Prix"	2023	88 Gymnastics Heros	3:16	
"Straight Line"	2024	Kwon Yong-soo (Saccharin Film)	3:07	
"Shooting Star"	2024	Jo Won-jun, Song Ji-yeop (Studio Wacko)	3:07	
"Tipi-tap"	2024	Hwang Hyunjin (KeepUsWeird)	3:03	
"Yum"	2025	Bang Jae-yeob	2:40	
"Bubble Gum"	2025	Kim In Tae (AFF)	2:57	
"Killa (Face the Other Me)"	2026	Kim Saro	3:15	

== Filmography ==
=== Television shows ===
Year	Title	Notes	Ref.
2021	Girls Planet 999	Survival show determining Kep1er's members	
2021	Kep1er View	Pre-debut reality show series	
2022	Kep1er Debut Show	Debut show	
2022	Queendom 2	Contestant	
2022	Kep1er Doublast On Air	Comeback show	
2023	Kep1er-unner	Reality show series	
2023	Kep1er Comeback Show: Lovestruck!	Comeback show	

=== Web shows ===
Year	Title	Notes	Ref.
2022–present	Kep1us	Behind the scenes of the members' activities	
2022	Kep1er Zone	Variety show series	
2022	KEPtain Heroes	Variety show series	
2023	Kep1ayer	Variety show series	
2023–2024	Kep1erving	Weekly variety shows	

== Awards and nominations ==
Name of the award ceremony, year presented, category, nominee of the award, and the result of the nomination
Award ceremony	Year	Category	Nominee / Work	Result	Ref.
Asia Artist Awards	2022	Best Choice Award – Music	Kep1er	Won	
Asia Artist Awards	2022	New Wave Award – Music	Kep1er	Won	
Asia Artist Awards	2023	Best Icon Award	Kep1er	Won	
Brand Customer Loyalty Awards	2022	Rookie of the Year (Female)	Kep1er	Won	
Cable TV Broadcasting Awards	2022	Star Award	Kep1er	Won	
Circle Chart Music Awards	2023	Song of the Year – January	"Wa Da Da"	Won	
Circle Chart Music Awards	2023	New Artist of the Year – Digital	"Wa Da Da"	Nominated	
Circle Chart Music Awards	2023	New Artist of the Year – Physical	Doublast	Nominated	
Genie Music Awards	2022	Best Female Rookie Award	Kep1er	Nominated	
Golden Disc Awards	2023	Rookie Artist of the Year	Kep1er	Nominated	
Hanteo Music Awards	2023	Rookie Artist of the Year	Kep1er	Won	
Hanteo Music Awards	2024	Popular Global Group	Kep1er	Won	
Japan Gold Disc Award	2023	Best 3 New Artists (Asia)	Kep1er	Won	
Japan Gold Disc Award	2023	Song of the Year by Streaming (Asia)	"Wa Da Da"	Won	
Japan Record Awards	2022	Special Achievement Award	Kep1er	Won	
K-Global Heart Dream Awards	2022	K-Global Super Rookie Award	Kep1er	Won	
Korea Model Awards	2022	Rising Star Award – Singer	Kep1er	Won	
MAMA Awards	2022	Favorite New Artist	Kep1er	Won	
MAMA Awards	2022	Best New Female Artist	Kep1er	Nominated	
MAMA Awards	2022	Worldwide Fans' Choice Top 10	Kep1er	Nominated	
MAMA Awards	2022	Artist of the Year	Kep1er	Longlisted	
MAMA Awards	2023	Favourite Asian Female Group	Kep1er	Won	
MAMA Awards	2023	Worldwide Fans' Choice Top 10	Kep1er	Nominated	
Melon Music Awards	2022	New Artist of the Year	Kep1er	Nominated	
Mnet Japan Fan's Choice Awards	2022	Rookie of the Year	Kep1er	Won	
Seoul Music Awards	2023	New Wave Star Award	Kep1er	Won	
Seoul Music Awards	2024	Hallyu Special Award	Kep1er	Nominated	
Seoul Music Awards	2024	Main Award (Bonsang)	Kep1er	Nominated	
Seoul Music Awards	2024	Popularity Award	Kep1er	Nominated	
Seoul Music Awards	2025	Main Prize (Bonsang)	Kep1er	Nominated	
Seoul Music Awards	2025	Popularity Award	Kep1er	Nominated	
Seoul Music Awards	2025	K-Wave Special Award	Kep1er	Nominated	
Seoul Music Awards	2025	K-pop World Choice – Group	Kep1er	Nominated	
Supersound Festival	2025	Female Group Performance	Kep1er	Won	
The Fact Music Awards	2022	Global Hottest Award	Kep1er	Won	
The Fact Music Awards	2022	Fan N Star Choice Award (Artist)	Kep1er	Nominated	
The Fact Music Awards	2022	Four Star Awards	Kep1er	Nominated	
The Fact Music Awards	2022	idolplus Popularity Award	Kep1er	Nominated	
