= Wa Da Da =

- The First Take Japanese live version cover

Single by Kep1er

from the EP First Impact
- Language: Korean
- Released: January 3, 2022
- Genre: Big room house
- Length: 3:04
- Label: WakeOne; Swing; Genie
- Composers: BuildingOwner (PrismFilter); Elum (PrismFilter); Shannon
- Lyricists: BuildingOwner (PrismFilter); Elum (PrismFilter); Shannon; Danke; Hwang Yu-bin; Odal Park; Lee Seu-ran; Kako

Kep1er singles chronology
| "Wa Da Da" (2022) | "Up!" (2022) |

Music video
- "Wa Da Da" on YouTube

"Wa Da Da" is a song recorded by South Korean girl group Kep1er for their debut extended play (EP) First Impact. It was released as the title track on January 3, 2022, by WakeOne.

== Background and release ==
Kep1er was originally scheduled to debut on December 14, 2021, with their first EP First Impact, with pre-orders beginning on November 29. However, it was announced that the group's scheduled debut had been delayed to January 3, 2022, due to one of their staff members having tested positive for COVID-19. On December 14, it was revealed that group members Mashiro and Xiaoting tested positive for COVID-19. On December 26, Kep1er's agency announced that Xiaoting and Mashiro have fully recovered from COVID-19.

On January 3, 2022, the song was released together with its accompanying music video.

== Composition ==
"Wa Da Da" was written by BuildingOwner (PrismFilter), Elum (PrismFilter), and Shannon, Danke, Hwang Yu-bin, Odal Park, Lee Seu-ran, and Kako, composed by BuildingOwner (PrismFilter), Elum (PrismFilter), and Shannon, and arranged by BuildingOwner (PrismFilter). Musically, the group is described as "dance song based on big room house genre" with lyrics about "Kep1er's bold aspiration to become the best and the promise to repay [their] fans who have supported and protected the nine girls' dreams". "Wa Da Da" was composed in the key of B-flat major, with a tempo of 126 beats per minute.

== Commercial performance ==
"Wa Da Da" debuted at position 130 on South Korea's Gaon Digital Chart in the chart issue dated January 9–15, 2022, ascending to position 79 in the chart issue dated January 30 – February 5, 2022. The song also debuted at position 21 on Gaon Download Chart in the chart issue dated January 2–8, 2022. On the Billboard K-pop Hot 100, the song debuted at position 84 in the chart issue dated January 5, 2022, ascending to position 71 in the following week. In Japan, the song debuted at position 20 on the Billboard Japan Japan Hot 100 in the chart issue dated January 12, 2022, ascending to position 9 in the chart issue dated January 26, 2022. The song also debuted at position 21 on the Oricon Combined Singles in the chart issue dated January 17, 2022, ascending to position 7 three weeks later.

In New Zealand, the song debuted at position 24 on RMNZ Hot Singles in the chart issue dated January 10, 2022. In Singapore, the song debuted at position 11 on the RIAS Top Streaming Chart in the chart issue dated January 7–13, 2022. The song also debuted at position 11 on the RIAS Top Regional Chart in the chart issue dated December 31, 2021 – January 6, 2022, ascending to position 3 in the chart issue dated January 7–13, 2022. In Vietnam, the song debuted at position 73 on the Billboard Vietnam Vietnam Hot 100 in the chart issue dated January 20, 2022.

In the United States, the song debuted at position 13 on the Billboard World Digital Song Sales in the chart issue dated January 15, 2022. Globally, the song debuted at position 117 on the Billboard Global 200 in the chart issue dated January 22, 2022, ascending to position 77 in the following week. The song also debuted at position 171 on the Billboard Global Excl. U.S. in the chart issue dated January 15, 2022, ascending to position 60 in the chart issue dated January 22, 2022.

== Promotion ==
Prior to the extended play's release, on January 3, 2022, Kep1er held a debut showcase to introduce the extended play and its song including "Wa Da Da". Following the release of the extended play, the group performed "Wa Da Da" on three music programs on the first week: KBS2's Music Bank on January 7, MBC's Show! Music Core on January 8, and SBS's Inkigayo on January 9. On the second week of the song release, the group performed on Mnet's M Countdown on January 13, and KBS2's Music Bank on January 14, where they won first place in both appearances. On the third week of the song release, the group performed on Mnet's M Countdown on January 20, where they won first place.

== Credits and personnel ==
Credits adapted from Melon.

- Kep1er – vocals
- BuildingOwner (PrismFilter) – lyrics, composition, arrangement
- Elum (PrismFilter) – lyrics, composition
- Shannon Bae – lyrics, composition
- Danke – lyrics
- Hwang Yu-bin – lyrics
- Odal Park – lyrics
- Lee Seu-ran – lyrics
- Kako – lyrics

== Charts ==
=== Weekly charts ===
Weekly chart performance for "Wa Da Da"
| Chart (2022) | Peak position |
|---|---|
| Global 200 (Billboard) | 77 |
| Japan (Japan Hot 100) | 9 |
| Japan Combined Singles (Oricon) | 7 |
| New Zealand Hot Singles (RMNZ) | 24 |
| Singapore (RIAS) | 11 |
| Singapore (Billboard) | 25 |
| South Korea (Gaon) | 75 |
| South Korea (K-pop Hot 100) | 70 |
| US World Digital Song Sales (Billboard) | 13 |
| Vietnam (Vietnam Hot 100) | 73 |

=== Monthly charts ===
Monthly chart performance for "Wa Da Da"
| Chart (2022) | Position |
|---|---|
| South Korea (Gaon) | 88 |

=== Year-end charts ===
Year-end chart performance for "Wa Da Da"
| Chart (2022) | Position |
|---|---|
| Japan (Japan Hot 100) | 46 |

== Certifications ==
Certifications for "Wa Da Da"
| Region | Certification | Certified units/sales |
Streaming
| Japan (RIAJ) | Platinum | 100,000,000^{†} |
^{†} Streaming-only figures based on certification alone.

== Accolades ==
Awards and nominations for "Wa Da Da"
| Award ceremony | Year | Category | Result | Ref. |
|---|---|---|---|---|
| Circle Chart Music Awards | 2023 | Artist of the Year – Global Digital Music (January) | Won | |

Music program awards
| Program | Date | Ref. |
|---|---|---|
| M Countdown | January 13, 2022 | |
| M Countdown | January 20, 2022 | |
| Music Bank | January 14, 2022 | |

== Release history ==
Release history for "Wa Da Da"
| Region | Date | Format | Version | Label |
|---|---|---|---|---|
| Various | January 3, 2022 | Digital download; streaming | Original | WakeOne; Swing |
| Various | September 8, 2022 | Digital download; streaming | Japanese live | The First Take |
