= Grand Prix (song) =

2023 single by Kep1er

- Digital cover

Single by Kep1er
- Language: Japanese
- B-side: "Sugar"; "Galileo" (Japanese version); "Giddy" (Japanese version)
- Released: November 22, 2023
- Length: 3:07
- Label: WakeOne; Ariola Japan
- Composers: Geek Boy; Caroline Gustavsson; Kyler Niko
- Lyricists: Rose Blueming; Yu Sena; Hiyori Nara
- Producer: Geek Boy

Kep1er singles chronology
"Galileo" (2023)	"Grand Prix" (2023)	"Straight Line" (2024)

Kep1er Japanese singles chronology
"I Do! Do You?" (2023)	"Grand Prix" (2023)	"Straight Line" (2024)

Music video
- "Grand Prix" on YouTube

"Grand Prix" is a song recorded by South Korean girl group Kep1er for their third Japanese maxi single marketed as Fly-High. It was pre-released as a digital single on November 8, 2023, and as a CD single featuring three other tracks on November 22, 2023, by WakeOne and Ariola Japan.

== Background and release ==
On October 10, 2023, Wake One Entertainment announced Kep1er would be releasing their third Japanese maxi single titled Fly-High together with its lead track "Grand Prix" on November 22. The track listing and highlight medley was released on October 31. Teasers for the music video were released on November 6 and 7. The song was pre-released alongside its music video on November 8.

== Composition ==
"Grand Prix" was written by Rose Blueming, Yu Sena, and Hiyori Nara, and composed by Geek Boy, Caroline Gustavsson, and Kyler Niko. The song "express the desire to run to the person you love and the joy when love comes true".

== Commercial performance ==
"Grand Prix" debuted at number 2 on the Oricon Daily Single Ranking, having sold 37,941 copies on the first day of release. It went on to sell over 100,000 copies, and received a gold certification for album sales in Japan.

== Promotion ==
Prior to the release of "Grand Prix", Kep1er performed the song during their Japanese fan meeting Fairy Fantasia on October 27 and 28. After the song's release, they performed it on CDTV Live! on November 20, and on Weekly 99 Music on December 27.

== Track listing ==
Digital download
No.	Title	Lyrics	Music	Length
1.	"Grand Prix"	Rose Blueming; Yu Sena; Hiyori Nara	Geek Boy; Caroline Gustavsson; Kyler Niko	3:07
2.	"Sugar"	Hiyori Nara	Matthew Tishler; Cozi Zuehlsdorff	2:34
3.	"Galileo" (Japanese version)	Seo Ji-eum; Yu Sena; Rose Blueming; Kana Koizumi	Yejune Synne (SNNNY); Josh Fountain; Lauren Aquilina; Marcus Andersson; Hero (SNNNY); Deeno (SNNNY)	3:09
4.	"Giddy" (Japanese version)	Hwang Yu-bin (Verygoods); Hiyori Nara	Stainboys (Room01); Alina Smith (Lyre); Annalise Morelli (Lyre); Gino Barletta; Justin Reinstein; Anna Timgren; Charlotte Wilson; JJean; Isa Guerra	3:40
Total length:				11:56

CD single – limited edition
No.	Title	Lyrics	Music	Length
1.	"Grand Prix"	Rose Blueming; Yu Sena; Hiyori Nara	Geek Boy; Caroline Gustavsson; Kyler Niko	3:07
2.	"Sugar"	Hiyori Nara	Matthew Tishler; Cozi Zuehlsdorff	2:34
3.	"Galileo" (Japanese version)	Seo Ji-eum; Yu Sena; Rose Blueming; Kana Koizumi	Yejune Synne (SNNNY); Josh Fountain; Lauren Aquilina; Marcus Andersson; Hero (SNNNY); Deeno (SNNNY)	3:09
4.	"Giddy" (Japanese version)	Hwang Yu-bin (Verygoods); Hiyori Nara	Stainboys (Room01); Alina Smith (Lyre); Annalise Morelli (Lyre); Gino Barletta; Justin Reinstein; Anna Timgren; Charlotte Wilson; JJean; Isa Guerra	3:40
Total length:				12:30

CD single – standard edition
No.	Title	Lyrics	Music	Length
1.	"Grand Prix"	Rose Blueming; Yu Sena; Hiyori Nara	Geek Boy; Caroline Gustavsson; Kyler Niko	3:07
2.	"Galileo" (Japanese version)	Seo Ji-eum; Yu Sena; Rose Blueming; Kana Koizumi	Yejune Synne (SNNNY); Josh Fountain; Lauren Aquilina; Marcus Andersson; Hero (SNNNY); Deeno (SNNNY)	3:09
3.	"Giddy" (Japanese version)	Hwang Yu-bin (Verygoods); Hiyori Nara	Stainboys (Room01); Alina Smith (Lyre); Annalise Morelli (Lyre); Gino Barletta; Justin Reinstein; Anna Timgren; Charlotte Wilson; JJean; Isa Guerra	3:40
4.	"Grand Prix" (Inst.)		Geek Boy; Caroline Gustavsson; Kyler Niko	3:07
Total length:				13:03

CD single – Kep1ian edition
No.	Title	Lyrics	Music	Length
1.	"Grand Prix"	Rose Blueming; Yu Sena; Hiyori Nara	Geek Boy; Caroline Gustavsson; Kyler Niko	3:07
2.	"Galileo" (Japanese version)	Seo Ji-eum; Yu Sena; Rose Blueming; Kana Koizumi	Yejune Synne (SNNNY); Josh Fountain; Lauren Aquilina; Marcus Andersson; Hero (SNNNY); Deeno (SNNNY)	3:09
3.	"Giddy" (Japanese version)	Hwang Yu-bin (Verygoods); Hiyori Nara	Stainboys (Room01); Alina Smith (Lyre); Annalise Morelli (Lyre); Gino Barletta; Justin Reinstein; Anna Timgren; Charlotte Wilson; JJean; Isa Guerra	3:40
4.	"Daisy" (Live version)	Tsingtao; Aaron Kim	Ejae; Nicole "Kole" Cohen; Isaac Han; Aaron Kim; Ghostchild Ltd; Ashe Ahn	TBA
Total length:				TBA

== Charts ==
=== Weekly charts ===
Weekly chart performance for "Grand Prix"
Chart (2023)	Peak position
Japan (Japan Hot 100)	6
Japan (Oricon)	2
Japan Combined Singles (Oricon)	2

=== Monthly charts ===
Monthly chart performance for "Grand Prix"
Chart (2023)	Position
Japan (Oricon)	5

=== Year-end charts ===
Year-end chart performance for "Grand Prix"
Chart (2023)	Position
Japan Top Singles Sales (Billboard Japan)	85
Japan (Oricon)	88

== Certifications ==
Certifications for Grand Prix
Region	Certification	Certified units/sales
Japan (RIAJ)	Gold	100,000^{^}
^{^} Shipments figures based on certification alone.

== Release history ==
Release history for "Grand Prix"
Region	Date	Format	Version	Label
Various	November 8, 2023	Digital download; streaming	Original	WakeOne; Ariola Japan
Japan	November 22, 2023	CD	Original	WakeOne; Ariola Japan
Various	June 3, 2024	Digital download; streaming	Korean	WakeOne
