= Swing Entertainment =

South Korean company

Swing Entertainment Co., Ltd.
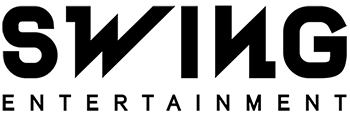
- Native name: 스윙 엔터테인먼트
- Company type: Private
- Industry: Music; Entertainment
- Genre: K-pop; R&B; EDM
- Founded: June 8, 2018
- Founder: Shin Dong-gil
- Defunct: June 1, 2024
- Fate: Absorbed by WakeOne in 2024
- Headquarters: 36 Noksapyeong-daero 26-gil, Yongsan-gu, Seoul, South Korea
- Key people: Shin Dong-gil (founder/executive director); Cho Yoo-myung (CEO)
- Services: Licensing; Publishing; Record distribution
- Owner: CJ ENM (51%); Cho Yoo-myung (33%); Shin Dong-gil (8%); Kim Dong-jun (8%)
- Number of employees: 20 (2020)
- Parent: CJ ENM
- Website: swingent.com

Swing Entertainment (Korean: 스윙 엔터테인먼트) was a South Korean entertainment agency established in June 2018 by executive producer Shin Dong-gil. In 2024, the company was absorbed by WakeOne.

The label formerly managed I.O.I, Wanna One, Iz*One, X1, Natty, Kim Jae-hwan, A.C.E (co-managed with Beat Interactive), and Kep1er (co-managed with Wake One).

== History ==
In June 2018, Stone Music Entertainment (CJ E&M main music label at this time) established the exclusive label Swing Entertainment for managing Wanna One since the latter ended their contract with YMC Entertainment, with Shin Dong-gil (who is the former manager under YMC Entertainment) as the label head. Starting from June 1, Wanna One would be managed under Swing Entertainment, a new agency exclusively established for the group after their contract with YMC Entertainment expired. This new arrangement would still maintain the partnership with YMC.

Following the disbandment of Wanna One, Kim Jae-hwan signed with Swing Entertainment in 2019. It was announced that 3 years after their disbandment, I.O.I was set to return in December, potentially with all 11 original members, and will be co-managed by Swing Entertainment and Studio Blu. However, their comeback was virtually canceled due to scheduling conflicts between the members and the ongoing Produce investigations. After the finale of the survival program, Produce X 101, the final winners, X1, were managed by Swing Entertainment and made their debut on August 27. However, due to the Mnet vote manipulation investigation, the group disbanded on January 6, 2020. In December, YMC Entertainment founder and ex-CEO Cho Yoo-myung became the new CEO of Swing Entertainment, replacing his colleague Shin who became an executive director.

On March 10, 2020, it was announced that Swing Entertainment would co-manage Iz*One with sister company Off The Record Entertainment. The group disbanded on April 29, 2021. On April 6, Natty, a former contestant in Sixteen and Idol School, signed with Swing Entertainment, before leaving two years later in 2022. On August 10, Kim Young-heum, recent contestant for The Voice of Korea season 3, signed with Swing Entertainment.

On February 5, 2021, it was announced that Swing Entertainment would co-manage A.C.E with Beat Interactive. On October 25, it was announced that the winner of the Girls Planet 999 group, Kep1er, would be managed by Swing Entertainment along with CJ E&M label Wake One. They made their debut on January 3, 2022, and the group's contract will last for two years and six months. On October 29, Swing and Million Market signed a memorandum of understanding with the then-newly formed Big Planet Made, thus forming a strategic alliance and business agreement, with the label distributing BPM artists' albums.

On April 3, 2024, Swing Entertainment was acquired by sister company WakeOne (formerly MMO Entertainment), and was absorbed by a merger on June 1.

== Former artists ==
- Wanna One (2017–2019)
  - Kim Jae-hwan (2017–2023)
- I.O.I (2019) (co-managed with Studio Blu)
- X1 (2019–2020)
- Iz*One (2018–2021) (co-managed with Off the Record Entertainment)
- Son Ho-young (2019–2021)
- Natty (2020–2022)
- Kim Young-heum (2020–2024)
- Xani (2020–2024)
- A.C.E (co-managed with Beat Interactive) (2021–2024)
- Kep1er (co-managed with Wake One) (2022–2024)
- Viviz (with BPM Entertainment) (2022–2024)
