= WakeOne =

South Korean record label

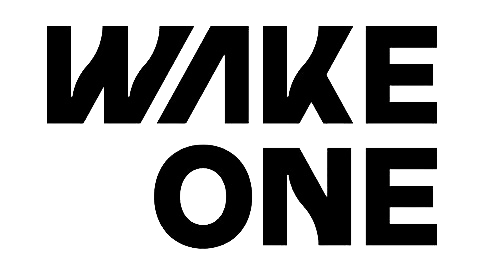
- Native name: 웨이크원
- Formerly: MMO Entertainment (2014–2020); Onefect Entertainment (Note: The company name prior to integration in 2021) (2020–2021)
- Type: Subsidiary
- Industry: Music
- Genre: K-pop; R&B; Folk
- Founded: February 18, 2014 (as MMO Entertainment)
- Headquarters: Seoul, South Korea
- Number of locations: 153 Tojeong-ro, Seogang-dong, Mapo-gu
- Key people: Nam Soyoung (CEO)
- Number of employees: 43 (2022)
- Parent: CJ ENM Entertainment Division
- Website: wake-one.com

WakeOne (Korean: 웨이크원, stylised in all caps) is a South Korean entertainment company under CJ ENM's entertainment division. Their current artists include Kim Feel, Ha Hyun-sang, Jo Yu-ri, Kep1er, Zerobaseone, Izna, and Alpha Drive One.

== History ==
=== 2014–2018: Founding and beginnings ===
The company was founded in 2014 by Son Dong-hoon under the name MMO Entertainment (MMO standing for Music Makes One, the slogan of CJ ENM's flagship music channel Mnet).

In September 2018, MMO and CJ ENM founded Off the Record Entertainment (Korean: 오프더레코드 엔터테인먼트) to manage Iz*One (now disbanded) and Fromis 9. Pledis Entertainment was involved in the creative direction and music production of both while they were in Off the Record until Pledis CEO withdrew from being involved with Iz*One after April 2020 (Fromis 9 continued to be in the label until they fully transferred to Pledis in August 2021). Iz*One and Fromis 9 are debut groups of Mnet's girl group survival shows Produce 48 and Idol School, respectively.

=== 2020–2021: Integration of CJ ENM management labels ===
In March 2020, the company name was changed to Onefect Entertainment.

In May 2021, CJ ENM launched 'WakeOne'. In August, CJ ENM officially launched the label while integrating their in-house production and management labels Stone Music Entertainment, One Effect Entertainment, Studio Blu, and Off the Record. In the same months, Fromis 9 were transferred to Pledis Entertainment. Following their terminated management contract with n.CH Entertainment by CJ ENM in early 2021, TO1 were transferred to WakeOne in May 2021 (after the company reorganization in the same month).

On October 25, it was announced that WakeOne would co-manage the winner of the Girls Planet 999 group, Kep1er, with sister company Swing Entertainment. In December 2021, former RBW composer and producer Park Woo-sang transferred to the label.

=== 2022–present: Merging with Swing Entertainment ===
In October 2022, 2AM's Lim Seul-ong signed a contract with WakeOne for his solo activities.

In January 2023, Dance crew Mbtious signed with the company.

In April 2023, nine members were selected through reality show Boys Planet to debut as the group Zerobaseone and would be managed by WakeOne.

On April 3, 2024, WakeOne announced that it would merge with Swing Entertainment with this going into effect on June 1. WakeOne is the surviving entity after the merger.

On July 4, 2024, seven members were selected through the reality show I-Land 2: N/a to debut as Izna would be managed by WakeOne and will be produced by The Black Label and become their first non-temporary girl group with a standard contract.

In June 2025, Soloist Kim Feel re-signed a contract with WakeOne, five years after parting ways with CJ ENM through its sub-label MMO Entertainment.

On September 25, 2025, eight members were selected through the reality show Boys II Planet to debut as the group Alpha Drive One and would be managed by WakeOne.

On November 3, 2025, it was announced that WakeOne had appointed former SM Entertainment co-CEO Nam So-young as its CEO. With this, the company reorganized as a two-center management system with Center 1 dedicated to ZEROBASEONE and izna, while Center 2 would focus on ALPHA DRIVE ONE's debut and solo artists.

On June 9, 2026, Billboard reported that WakeOne entered into a strategic partnership with Republic Collective, a division of Universal Music Group. The partnership will support Izna and Alpha Drive One in their global expansion, including album promotion and distribution.

On August 7, 2026, WakeOne announced that Off The Record Entertainment would be reopening as an integrated sub-division.

== Artists ==
=== Groups ===
==== WakeOne ====
- Kep1er (with KLAP Entertainment)
- Zerobaseone
- Izna (with The Black Label)
- Alpha Drive One

=== Soloists ===
==== WakeOne ====
- Jo Yuri
- Shen Xiaoting

==== Off The Record Entertainment ====
- Kim Feel
- Ha Hyun-sang
- Kim Jae-hwan
- Lim Seul-ong

=== Producers ===
- Park Woo-sang

== Former artists ==
- Song Soo-woo (Note: Winner of the 2020–2021 Mnet teenage audition program CAP-TEEN.) (2021–2022)
- TO1 (2020–2023)
  - Choi Chi-hoon (2020–2022)
  - Kim Min-su (2020–2022)
  - Cha Woong-gi (2020–2022)
  - Oh Seong-min (2020–2023)
  - Renta (2022–2023)
- Mbitious (2023–2024) (Note: Dance crew that was formed on Mnet's survival program Be Mbitious. The crew then placed 3rd on Mnet's Street Man Fighter.)
- Davichi (2014–2024)
- Kep1er
  - Sakamoto Mashiro (2021–2024)
  - Kang Ye-seo (2021–2024)
  - Seo Young-eun (2021–2026)
- Roy Kim (2013–2025) (Note: He debuted and signed with CJ E&M in 2013 before transfer to sub-label MMO Entertainment (later known as WakeOne).)
- Izna
  - Yoon Ji-yoon (2024–2025)
- Zerobaseone
  - Zhang Hao (2023–2026)
  - Kim Gyu-vin (2023–2026)
  - Ricky (2023–2026)
  - Han Yu-jin (2023–2026)

=== MMO Entertainment ===
- Hong Dae-kwang (2014–2017)
- Wable (2016–2017)
- IN2IT (2017–2020) (Note: In 2020, remaining of the six member left from the company and continue as a group)
  - Jinsub (2017–2018)
  - Sunghyun (2017–2019)
- Park Bo-ram (2014–2018)
- Son Ho-young (2017–2019) (Note: In 2019, Son continue his contract with CJ ENM and were transfer to the company label Swing Entertainment.)
- Kim Feel (2016–2020)
- Hoons (Note: Since 2018, the duo was releases music under MMO Entertainment along with Stone Music's FRON+DESK.)
- Kang Daniel
- Yoon Ji-sung
- Won Seo-yeon
