= Sakamoto Mashiro =

Japanese singer (born 1999)

- 坂本 舞白
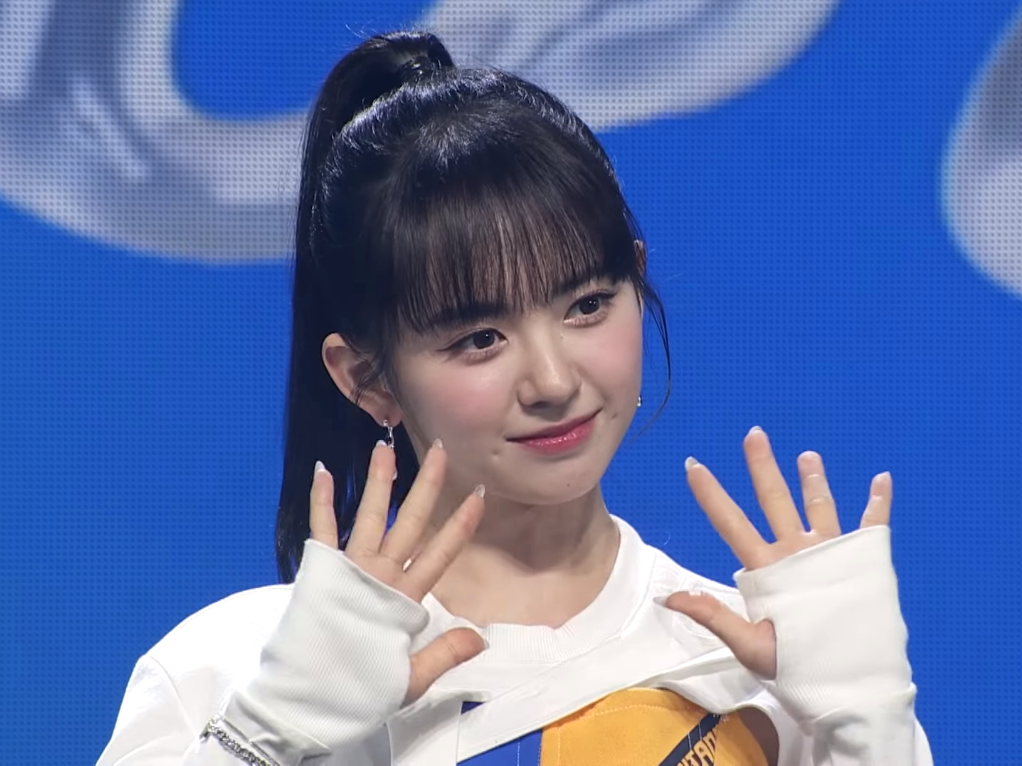
- Sakamoto in 2022
- Born: December 16, 1999 (age 26); Japan
- Occupations: Singer; dancer
- Musical career
- Genres: K-pop
- Instrument: Vocals
- Years active: 2022–present
- Labels: 143 Entertainment; WakeOne (Note: As a member of Kep1er only.); Swing
- Member of: Madein
- Formerly of: Kep1er

Signature
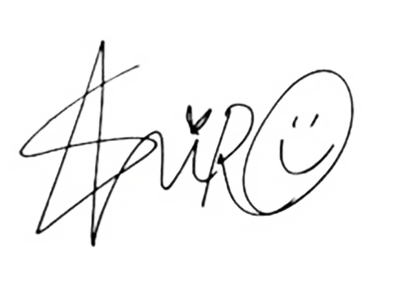

Mashiro Sakamoto (坂本 舞白, Sakamoto Mashiro; born December 16, 1999), known mononymously as Mashiro, is a Japanese singer and dancer based in South Korea. She first gained recognition as a member of the girl group Kep1er, formed through the reality competition series Girls Planet 999, before departing the group in 2024 to join Madein under 143 Entertainment. She made her solo debut on August 19, 2026, with the extended play 24/11 and its lead single "Hotline".

== Career ==
=== Pre-debut activities ===
Sakamoto was a trainee at JYP Entertainment from 2016 to 2018.

=== 2021–2024: Girls Planet 999 and debut with Kep1er ===
Sakamoto rose to prominence as a contestant on Mnet's 2021 reality competition Girls Planet 999, which selected the members of the resulting girl group Kep1er; she went on to begin her music career with the group. On May 30, 2024, Sakamoto's agencies, WakeOne and Swing Entertainment, announced that she would conclude her activities with Kep1er, alongside fellow member Yeseo, following the group's scheduled Japanese concert, while the remaining seven members renewed their contracts. Reports at the time indicated the pair would return to their original agency, 143 Entertainment.

=== 2024–present: Madein and solo debut ===
Following her departure from Kep1er, Sakamoto joined 143 Entertainment's new girl group Madein, of which she became the leader. On July 22, 2026, 143 Entertainment announced that Sakamoto would release her debut solo extended play, 24/11, on August 19, with the lead single "Hotline", which blends afrobeat rhythms with dance-pop. Ahead of the release, Sakamoto previewed "Hotline" during Madein's first solo concert Madein Link Up held in Kobe, Japan, on July 31.

== Discography ==
=== Extended plays ===
List of extended plays, showing selected details, selected chart positions, and sales figures
Title	Details	Peak chart positions	Sales
Title	Details	KOR	Sales
24/11	Released: August 19, 2026; Label: 143 Entertainment; Formats: CD, digital download, streaming; Track listing: 1. "Hotline" (featuring Bobby); 2. "Make Up"; 3. "Bubble Trouble"; 4. "Toothbrush"; 5. "Hotline" (Inst.); 6. "Make Up" (Inst.)	35	KOR: 3,543

=== Singles ===
List of singles, showing year released, selected chart positions, and name of the album
Title	Year	Peak chart positions	Album
Title	Year	KOR Down.	Album
"Hotline" (featuring Bobby)	2026	127	24/11

== Videography ==
=== Music videos ===
List of music videos, showing year released and name of the directors
Title	Year	Director(s)	Ref.
"Hotline" (featuring Bobby)	2026	Hyeya (815Video)	

== Filmography ==
=== Television shows ===
Year	Title	Role	Notes	Ref.
2021	Girls Planet 999	Contestant	Placed 8th	
