= Shen Xiaoting =

Chinese singer (born 1999)

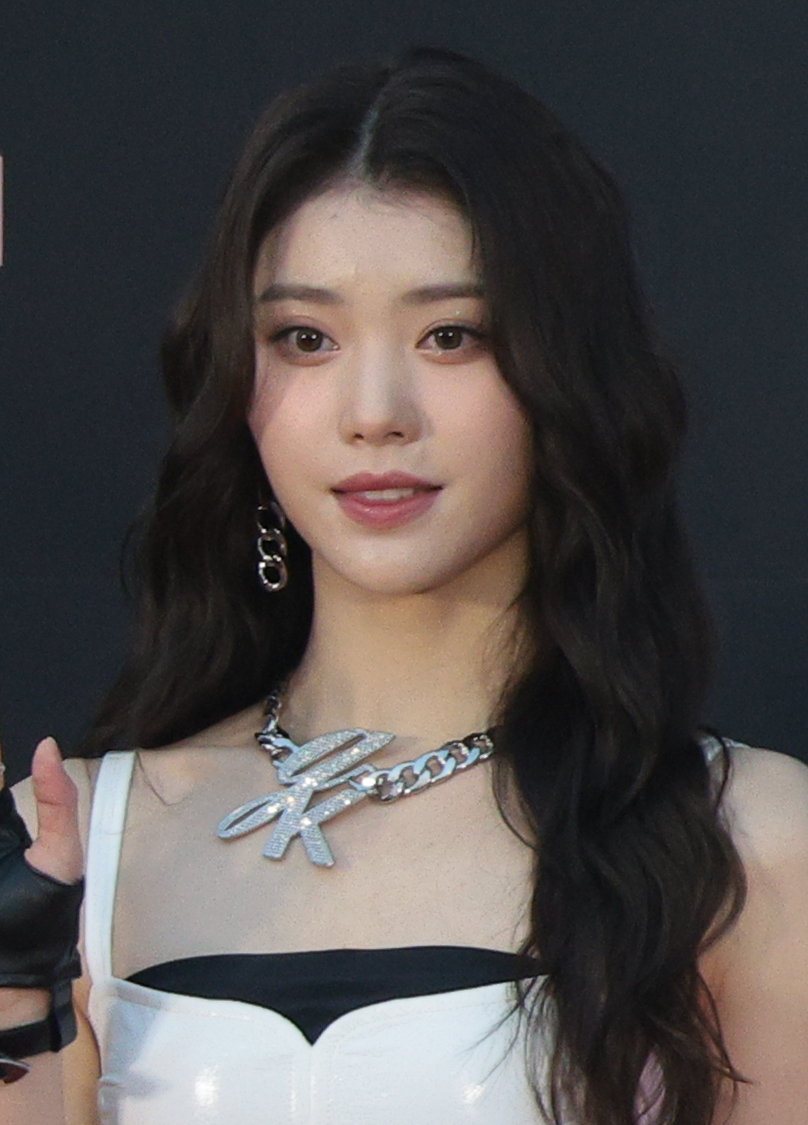
- Shen in February 2023
- Born: November 12, 1999 (age 26); Chengdu, Sichuan, China
- Education: Sichuan Conservatory of Music
- Occupations: Singer; dancer
- Musical career
- Genres: K-pop
- Instrument: Vocals
- Years active: 2022–present
- Labels: WakeOne; Swing
- Member of: Kep1er

Chinese name
- Chinese: 沈小婷
- Hanyu Pinyin: Shěn Xiǎotíng

Signature
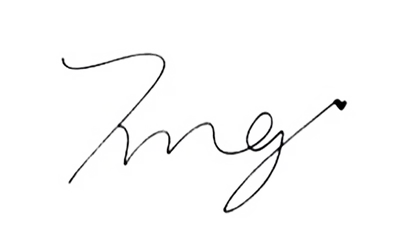

Shen Xiaoting (Chinese: 沈小婷; Korean: 션샤오팅; born November 12, 1999), known mononymously as Xiaoting, is a Chinese singer and dancer based in South Korea. She rose to prominence as a member of the girl group Kep1er, formed through the reality competition show Girls Planet 999. She debuted as a solo artist with the release of the digital single "Legend" on July 30, 2026.

== Early life ==
Shen Xiaoting was born on November 12, 1999, in Chengdu, Sichuan, China. Her background is rooted in competitive ballroom and modern dance, a discipline she practiced for several years while she was studying in the Sichuan Conservatory of Music, before transitioning to the music industry.

== Career ==
=== 2020–2021: Produce Camp 2020 and Girls Planet 999 ===
Shen's initial foray into reality television occurred in 2020 as a trainee for Top Class Entertainment on Produce Camp 2020, where she finished in 80th place. Greater success followed the next year on Mnet's Girls Planet 999; despite a competitive field, she secured the ninth and final spot in the lineup for the resulting group, Kep1er.

=== 2022–2025: Debut with Kep1er and solo activities ===
Following Kep1er's debut in January 2022 with the EP First Impact, Shen gained significant individual recognition for her technical skill. Her performance in the dance sport category at the September 2022 Idol Star Athletics Championships became a viral moment, resulting in a gold medal win and widespread praise for her professional ballroom background. Recognition in her home country followed at the 2024 Weibo Music Awards, where she was named "Most Anticipated Singer of the Year."

Her career path took a new turn in early 2025. Following the conclusion of her contract with Top Class Entertainment, she remained with Kep1er under a joint agreement between WakeOne and KLAP Entertainment. That same year, she returned to the survival show format as a "Special Idol Master" for Mnet's Boys II Planet, providing mentorship to contestants in the C-group unit. During promotional activities for the show, she indicated a desire to transition into acting, citing her previous studies in performing arts as a foundation for this move.

=== 2026–present: Solo debut with "Legend" ===
On July 30, 2026, Shen made her solo debut with the digital single "Legend".

== Public image ==
=== In the media ===
Shen is known for her background in competitive ballroom dance, which has been highlighted as a distinguishing aspect of her performance style. Her appearances in the Dancesport category of the Idol Star Athletics Championships, where she won gold in 2022 and silver in 2025 made her gain the moniker of "아육대 댄싱퀸" (ISAC's Dancing Queen) in the Korean media.

=== Endorsements ===
Shen appeared on the covers of the Chinese edition of InStyle in December 2024, Elle Man Fresh in September 2025, and Wonderland in January 2026.

== Discography ==
=== Singles ===
Title	Year	Album
"一夜长大"	2024	Remake of Youth S9
"Legend"	2026	Non-album single

=== Other songs ===
Title	Year	Note
"I Stay" (Chinese version)	2026	Promotional song for Ne Zha 2
"Olympics"	2026	Released alongside the single "Legend"

== Videography ==
=== Music videos ===
List of music videos, showing year released, and name of the directors
Title	Year	Director(s)	Ref.
"Legend"	2026	22_Ban	

== Filmography ==
=== Television shows ===
Year	Title	Role	Notes	Ref.
2020	Produce Camp 2020	Contestant	Placed 80th	
2021	Girls Planet 999	Contestant	Placed 9th	
2025	Boys II Planet	Special Idol Master	Mentor for C-group unit	

== Awards and nominations ==
Year	Award	Category	Result	Ref.
2024	Weibo Music Awards	Most Anticipated Singer of the Year	Won	
