= Etude House =

South Korean cosmetics brand

Etude
- Native name: 에뛰드
- Founded: 1966; 60 years ago
- Headquarters: Seoul, South Korea
- Number of locations: 231 (2018)
- Area served: Worldwide
- Products: Cosmetics
- Parent: Amore Pacific
- Website: etude.com

Etude (Korean: 에뛰드) is a South Korean cosmetics brand owned by Amore Pacific. The brand name 'Étude' means 'study' in French. As of 2018, there were 393 Etude stores, and in 2019, only 285 Etude stores.

In 2021, Etude had a rebrand, simplifying its previous name Etude House (Korean: 에뛰드하우스).

== History ==
The company was established in 1966 and the corporate name was changed to Oscar Corporation in 1985. In 1990, it was incorporated by Amore Pacific Group. The name was changed to Etude Corporation in 1997.

Etude House Seoul was launched in 2005. It opened its 100th brand store in 2007 and its 200th in 2009.

Previous Etude House logo, used 2005-2021

In 2009, Etude House launched stores in Taiwan, Singapore and the Philippines. It also launched stores in Brunei and Myanmar in 2010. It opened its 100th overseas branch in the same year.

Etude House opened its first branch in Shinjuku, Japan, in November 2011.

During March 2018, certain products were recalled by the Ministry of Food and Drug Safety for containing high amounts of antimony, shortly before Etude House opened its first branch in the Middle East in Dubai and a second branch in Kuwait.

In September 2021, Etude House rebranded into Etude, with a new logo and brand identity. The brand cited wanting to move away from its younger princess carriage aesthetic to a more simplified appearance, in hopes of attracting a more mature millennial audience.

== Spokespersons and models ==
Etude House was endorsed by Jun Ji-hyun from 1999 to 2000. S.E.S replaced her and endorsed the brand from 2000 to 2001. Song Hye-kyo became a model of Etude House in 2001 and endorsed the brand until 2006. Jang Keun-suk and Go Ara were models of the brand from 2006 to 2008. Lee Min-ho, Park Shin-hye, Yoo Seung-ho was a model of the brand from 2009 to 2010. 2NE1 was the first YG Entertainment artists that Etude worked with from 2010 to 2011. Sandara Park became a model from 2011 to 2012.

In October 2011, Etude House officially announced their first male endorser SHINee stating that "SHINee has received great love not only in Asia but also in Europe. It makes SHINee the leader in the Hallyu Wave. As the idols who have grown into men, they are very appropriate to be appointed as models of Etude House."

Krystal Jung and Sulli became a model of Etude House in 2013 to 2014 and endorsed the brand until 2018. I.O.I were models in 2017. In 2018, the members of Red Velvet became Etude House models. In 2019, Kim Do-ah from Fanatics was the model for Etude House. In 2022, Kazuha the member of Le Sserafim became Etude's new muse.

== Marketing ==
Etude House's previous brand concept emphasised heavily on the 'pink princess' aesthetic, their brand ambition being for each customer to 'feel like and unleash their inner princess' through make up and beauty product self-expression. Etude described this as 'princess marketing', creating their own term for the concept, 'etudeau'. Part of this strategy included Etude House staff greeting customers as 'princess', each store having a doll house 'pretty pink' theme, and employees wearing pink aprons.

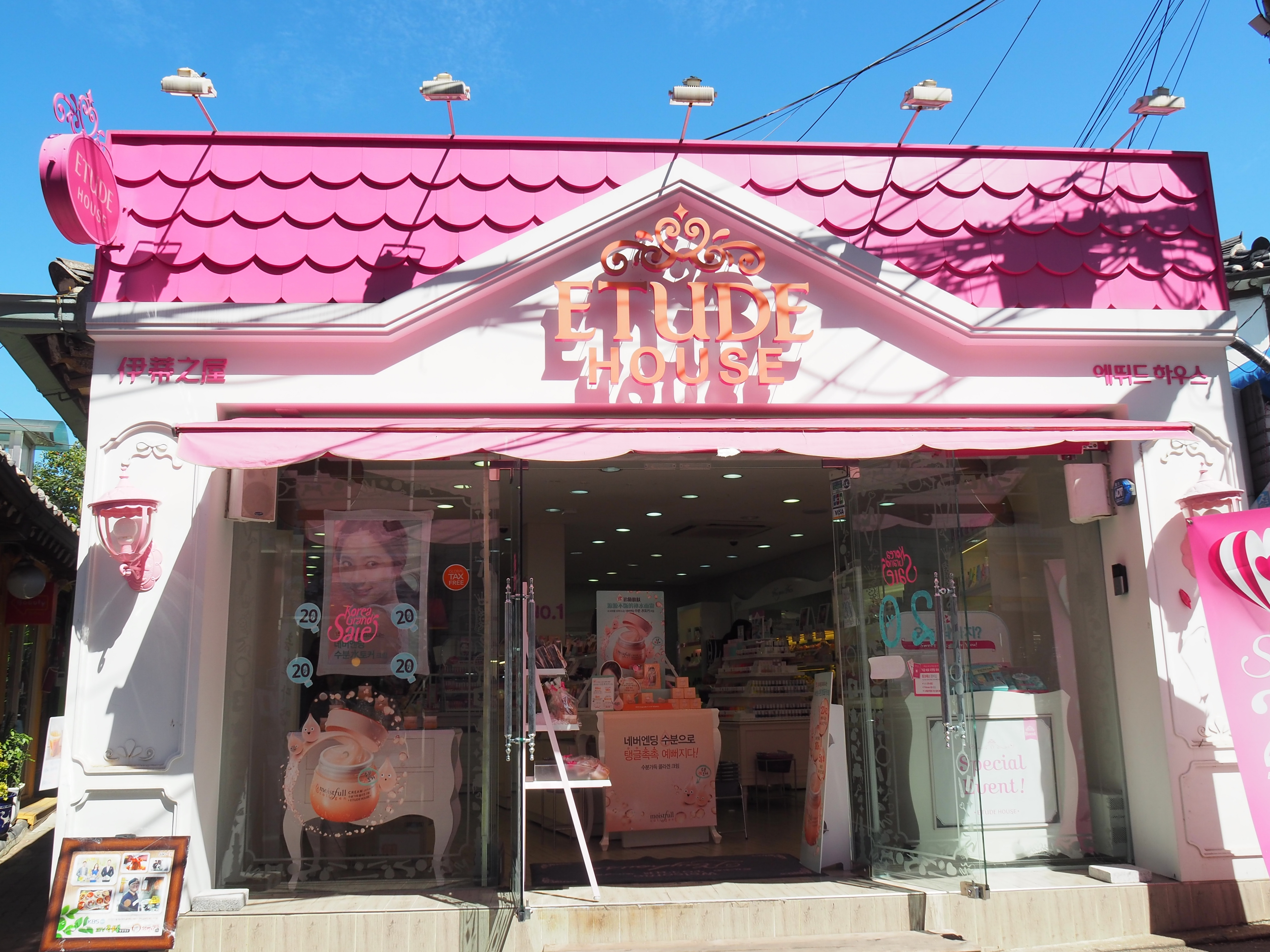
An Etude House store, showcasing the pink 'doll house' brand identity

After the 2021 rebrand, Etude retained its signature pink colour and playful packaging, however it is now much more subtle and sleeker, inline with modern minimalistic beauty and skincare packaging and brand identity trends. The previous brand identity was considered more childlike and closer to Korean fashion and beauty trends of the 2000s and 2010s, which alienated their target audience of 'fun-loving millennials'. Etude believe their new brand identity appeals to the global fashion and beauty trends of present and an older audience, whilst retaining their 'core value of staying faithful to oneself and carving out your own path'.

== Controversy ==
Following the Namyang Dairy Incident, the 'Tyranny of the Cosmetic Industry', which was uncovered in June 2013, revealed that Etude House, along with Amore Pacific, Tony Moly, and The Face Shop, had been viciously domineering to the agency owners. The unfair trade practices of the cosmetic affiliate headquarters were found to violate the law, such as compulsory purchase (so-called pushing out quantity, skipping quantity), forced sales target, forced provision of economic benefits, unfair contract renewal refusal, unfair contract termination, sales support refusal, and business area infringement.
