= Kang Ye-seo =

South Korean singer and actress (born 2005)

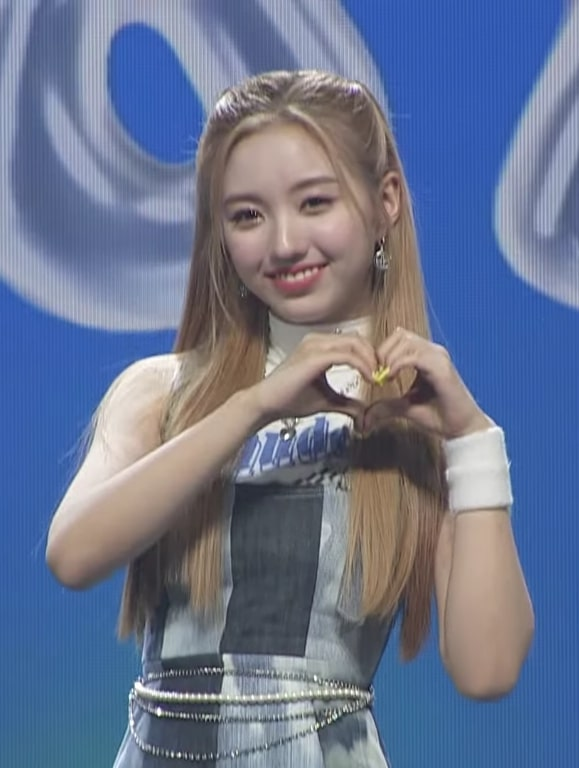
- Kang in June 2022
- Born: August 22, 2005 (age 21); Incheon, South Korea
- Education: Dongguk University
- Occupations: Singer; actress
- Years active: 2010–present
- Musical career
- Genres: K-pop; Dance-pop
- Instrument: Vocals
- Labels: 143 Entertainment; WakeOne (Note: As a member of Kep1er only.); Swing
- Formerly of: CutieL; Busters; Kep1er; Madein

Korean name
- Hangul: 강예서
- RR: Gang Yeseo
- MR: Kang Yesŏ

Kang Ye-seo (Korean: 강예서; born August 22, 2005), known mononymously as Yeseo, is a South Korean singer and actress. She is best known as a former member of the group Kep1er, having finished 6th in the Mnet survival competition show Girls Planet 999. She departed from Kep1er and joined the group Madein in July 2024. As an actress, Kang began her career in a supporting role in the MBC drama, Golden Fish (2010).

== Career ==
=== 2010–2020: Early career beginnings ===
Kang began her acting career in 2010 in a supporting role in the MBC drama, Golden Fish and at the same time, she became a member of the kid's girl group CutieL.

She started gaining popularity in 2013 for acting in the film Miracle in Cell No. 7 as Choi Ji-yeon for her famous Sailor Moon backpack, which helped Sailor Moon gain domestic popularity in Korea. She then acted in almost 20 dramas.

Kang became a new member of Busters to replace Minjung towards the end of January. She made her debut on July 31, 2019, with their first extended play Pinky Promise. On August 6, 2020, Kang left the group to continue acting and other activities.

=== 2021–present: Girls Planet 999, Kep1er and Madein ===
On July 18, 2021, Kang was officially announced as a contestant in Mnet's survival show Girls Planet 999 where she represented 143 Entertainment alongside fellow Kep1er member Mashiro Sakamoto. On October 22, Kang placed 6th with a total of 770,561 points in the final episode thus making her included in final group lineup.

On January 3, 2022, she officially debuted as a member of Kep1er with the release of their first EP, First Impact.

On July 15, 2024, Kang, along with Mashiro, left Kep1er. On July 29, it was officially announced that Kang would be part of the rebranded group Madein. She left the group in December 2025.

In February 2026, Kang return to acting in her theatrical debut The Belgian Fish as Petit Filleux, with Jo Min-kyung.

== Filmography ==
=== Film ===
| Year | Title | Role | Notes | Ref. |
|---|---|---|---|---|
| 2012 | Fighting Family | The Seahorse Family | | |
| 2013 | Miracle in Cell No. 7 | Choi Ji-yeon | | |
| 2013 | Sprout | Yeseo | | |
| 2014 | Forgive Me | young Min-ji | | |
| 2017 | One Step | young Si-hyun | | |

=== Television series ===
| Year | Title | Role | Notes | Ref. |
|---|---|---|---|---|
| 2010 | Golden Fish | Moon Seo-yeon | | |
| 2010 | Smile, Mom | Shin Yoo-ra | | |
| 2011 | Brain | Choi Ryu-bi | | |
| 2011 | Men Cry | Lim Ju-hee | | |
| 2011 | Duet | Han Joon-hwi | | |
| 2012 | The Korean Peninsula | Im Jin-jae | | |
| 2012 | Angel's Choice | Yoo-ran and Sang-ho's daughter | | |
| 2012 | Dream of the Emperor | Young Princess Yeon-hwa | | |
| 2013 | Flower of Revenge | Yoo Ye-ji | | |
| 2017 | Ancient Beast | Song Ha-eun | | |
| 2019 | Abyss | young Jang Hee-jin and young Oh Su-jin | | |
| 2020 | Diary of a Prosecutor | Yang Eun-jung | | |
| 2021 | Cheat on Me If You Can | Park Yeo-ju | | |
| 2021 | Bossam: Steal the Fate | Kim Hye-yoon | | |

=== Television shows ===
| Year | Title | Role | Notes | Ref. |
|---|---|---|---|---|
| 2021 | Girls Planet 999 | Contestant | Finished 6th | |

== Theater ==
| Year | Title | Role | Venue | Notes | Ref. |
|---|---|---|---|---|---|
| 2026 | The Belgian Fish | Petit Filleux | Jiguin Art Hall Small | with Jo Min-kyung | |
