= Xu Ziyin =

- 徐紫茵
- Born: Luo Ruihua; May 6, 1996 (age 30); Xiamen, Fujian, China
- Other names: Roada; Roada Xu
- Education: Beijing Film Academy
- Occupations: Singer; actress
- Musical career
- Genres: C-pop; K-pop; Hip hop
- Instrument: Vocals
- Years active: 2008–present
- Label: Sony Music

Chinese name
- Traditional Chinese: 徐紫茵
- Simplified Chinese: 徐紫茵
Transcriptions
Standard Mandarin
- Hanyu Pinyin: Xú Zǐyīn

Xu Ziyin (Chinese: 徐紫茵; Korean: 쉬쯔인; born Luo Ruihua [罗瑞华]; May 6, 1996), also known as Roada Xu, is a Chinese singer, songwriter, and actress under T Entertainment. She is best known for participating in the girl group survival shows Youth With You Season 2 and Girls Planet 999.

== Early life ==
Xu Ziyin was born as Luo Ruihua on May 6, 1996 in Xiamen, Fujian, China. She started singing from a young age and uploaded many song covers on the music platform 5sing since 2008, when she was 13 years old. She graduated from Xiamen Shuangshi High School in 2014, and in 2018, she graduated from the Beijing Film Academy, placing first in her specialized course.

== Career ==
Xu was qualified to be a trainee in several South Korean entertainment companies, but she never signed contracts with them to focus on her studies.

In 2008, Xu was qualified to be a trainee for JYP Entertainment.

In 2011, Xu was qualified to be a trainee for SM Entertainment.

In 2013, Xu was qualified to be a trainee for Cube Entertainment.

In 2018, Xu participated in Dragon TV's idol survival show The Next Top Bang.

In March 2019, Xu starred in the film Song of Youth as Li Haiyan. In June 2019, she acted in the drama Young Blood as Xiao Hua.

In the beginning of 2020, Xu participated in the girl group survival show Youth With You (season 2), where she finished in 18th place. On June 27, she performed the song "想见你想见你想见你" at the "Hello Future - Graduation Songs 2020" concert, and on August 8, she took part in the K11 x TME music festival "Born To Be Impatient", performing the song "做梦" with Joyce Chu. On October 4, 2020, Xu released her first OST, "Say Yes", for the drama Love is Sweet. In November and December 2020, she participated in the exploration variety show Bird Girls along with three other contestants from Youth With You (season 2). On December 14, Xu attended the 2020 Sina Fashion Style Awards and won the "Fashion Potential Artist of the Year" award. Later that month, on December 30, she released the song "My Gravity (地心引力)", which was also the first song of her first self-composed EP "IN".

On February 19, 2021, Xu released her first self-composed EP "IN", which was composed of the songs "My Gravity (地心引力)", "Hunger (饿意)", and "VIBE". An MV for "VIBE" was later released on February 25. On March 30, 2021, Xu released the OST "Love Letter" for the drama In Love With Your Dimples.

On July 18, 2021, Xu was officially announced as a contestant in Mnet's upcoming survival show Girls Planet 999. Despite being able to survive in the second elimination round, she left the show shortly after the announcement due to health issues and finished 8th in C-Group.

On January 26, 2022, Xu acted as Han Tengteng for the drama Shining For One Thing. On September 26, 2022, Xu Ziyin signed to Sony Music.

== Awards and achievements ==
Year	Nominee/work	Award	Category	Result	Ref.
2020	Xu Ziyin	2020 Sina Fashion Style Awards	Fashion Potential Artist of the Year Award	Won	

== Discography ==
=== Extended plays ===
Title	EP details	Sales
IN	Released: February 19, 2021; Language: Mandarin; Label: Hot Idol Entertainment; Formats: Digital download, streaming; Track Listing: 1. "My Gravity 地心引力" (with G.I.A 金吉雅); 2. "Hunger 饿意" (with Oscar 奥斯卡); 3. "VIBE"	N/A

=== Soundtrack appearances ===
Title	Year	Peak chart position		Album
Title	Year	CHN	TWN	Album
"Say Yes"	2020	—	—	Love is Sweet OST
"超级爱我的他"	2020	—	—	Oh My Drama Lover OST
"Love Letter"	2021	—	—	In Love With Your Dimples OST
"—" denotes releases that did not chart or were not released in that region.

=== Youth With You (Season 2) ===
Song	Original Artist	Notes
My Secret (我的秘密)	G.E.M.	Mission 1: Position Evaluation
Ambush On All Sides 2 (十面埋伏2)	Ivy, Dany Lee	Mission 2: Group Battle
Miss You 3000 (想见你想见你想見你)	八三夭831	Group Revenge
Light Orange Island (浅橘色孤岛)	Xu Ziyin, Dai Yanni, Duan Yixuan, Song Xinran, Xu Xinwen, Zhang Yu, Zuo Zhuo	Mission 3: Theme Song Assessment
Never Give Up (不服)	Silence Wang	Mission 4: Cooperation Stage
Hunt (猎)	Xu Ziyin, An Qi, Dai Yanni, Jin Zihan, Liu Lingzi, Lu Keran, Sun Rui, Xu Jiaqi, Yu Shuxin, Zhao Xiaotang	Mission 5: Final Stage Performance

== Filmography ==
=== Film ===
Year	Title		Role	Notes	Ref.
Year	English	Original	Role	Notes	Ref.
2019	Song of Youth	老师·好	Li Haiyan		

=== Television series ===
Year	Title		Role	Notes/Ref.
Year	English	Original	Role	Notes/Ref.
2019	Young Blood	大宋少年志	Xiao Hua	
2022	Shining for One Thing	一闪一闪亮星星	Han Teng Teng	
2023	Meet With Two Souls	再遇两个他	Luo Xuan	Main Role
2023	Female Officer, Please Offer Your Guidance	女官大人多指教	Zhong Yunxin	Support role
2023	Love You Is Self - Evident	爱你不言而喻	Mo Ningxi	Main Role
2023	Trick in Love	套路先生请指示	Mo Su Qing	Main Role

=== Television shows ===
Year	Title		Network	Role	Notes	Ref.
Year	English	Original	Network	Role	Notes	Ref.
2018	The Next Top Bang	下一站传奇	Dragon TV	Contestant		
2020	Youth With You 2	青春有你 2	iQiyi	Contestant	Finished 18th	
2020	GodLie		Huya Live	Guest		
2020	Bird Girls	探索青年飞鸟记		Guest		
2021	Music Public Class	音乐公开课	CCTV-15	Guest		
2021	Girls Planet 999	걸스플래닛999	Mnet	Contestant	Left the program in episode 8 due to health issues	
