= Ichillin' =

South Korean girl group

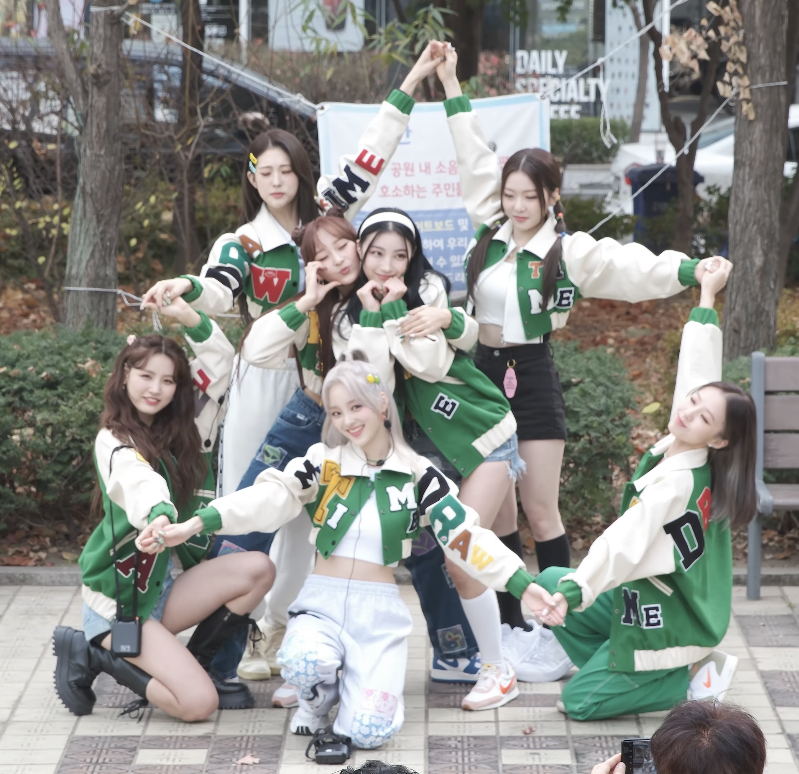
- Ichillin' in November 2022; Top, left to right: Joonie, Chowon, Yeju, Jackie; Bottom, left to right: Jiyoon, E.Ji, Chaerin

Background information
- Origin: Seoul, South Korea
- Genres: K-pop
- Years active: 2021–present
- Label: KM Entertainment
- Spinoffs: Ichillin' J
- Members: Jiyoon; E.Ji; Jackie; Joonie; Chaerin; Yeju; Chowon
- Past members: Sohee
- Website: https://kment.kr

Ichillin' (Korean: 아이칠린; stylized as ICHILLIN') is a South Korean girl group formed by KM Entertainment. The group is currently composed of seven members: Jiyoon, E.Ji, Jackie, Joonie, Chaerin, Yeju and Chowon. Former member Sohee left the group in July 2022. The group made their debut on September 8, 2021, with the digital single "Got'Ya".

== Name ==
Logo of Ichillin'

The group name Ichillin' is a compound of the words Aisling, which has the meaning of dream and vision, and Chillin, which has the meaning of relaxing or coolness. This is made in hopes of encouraging the listeners of their music to dream and relax.

The official fan club name of Ichillin' is "Willing", which was announced on December 10, 2021 after a poll between 7 candidates that each of the members have picked. It has the meaning of ardent fans who enthusiastically like the group.

== History ==
=== 2021: Debut with Got'Ya and comeback with Fresh ===
Ichillin' was to debut on August 25, 2021, but it was delayed in order to show more completeness in the group through improvements on the album. The group subsequently made their debut with their first digital single "Got'Ya" on September 8, 2021, two weeks after the supposed debut date.

The group then had their first comeback on November 11 the same year with their second digital single "Fresh".

=== 2022: Bridge of Dreams, changes to the group and Draw ===
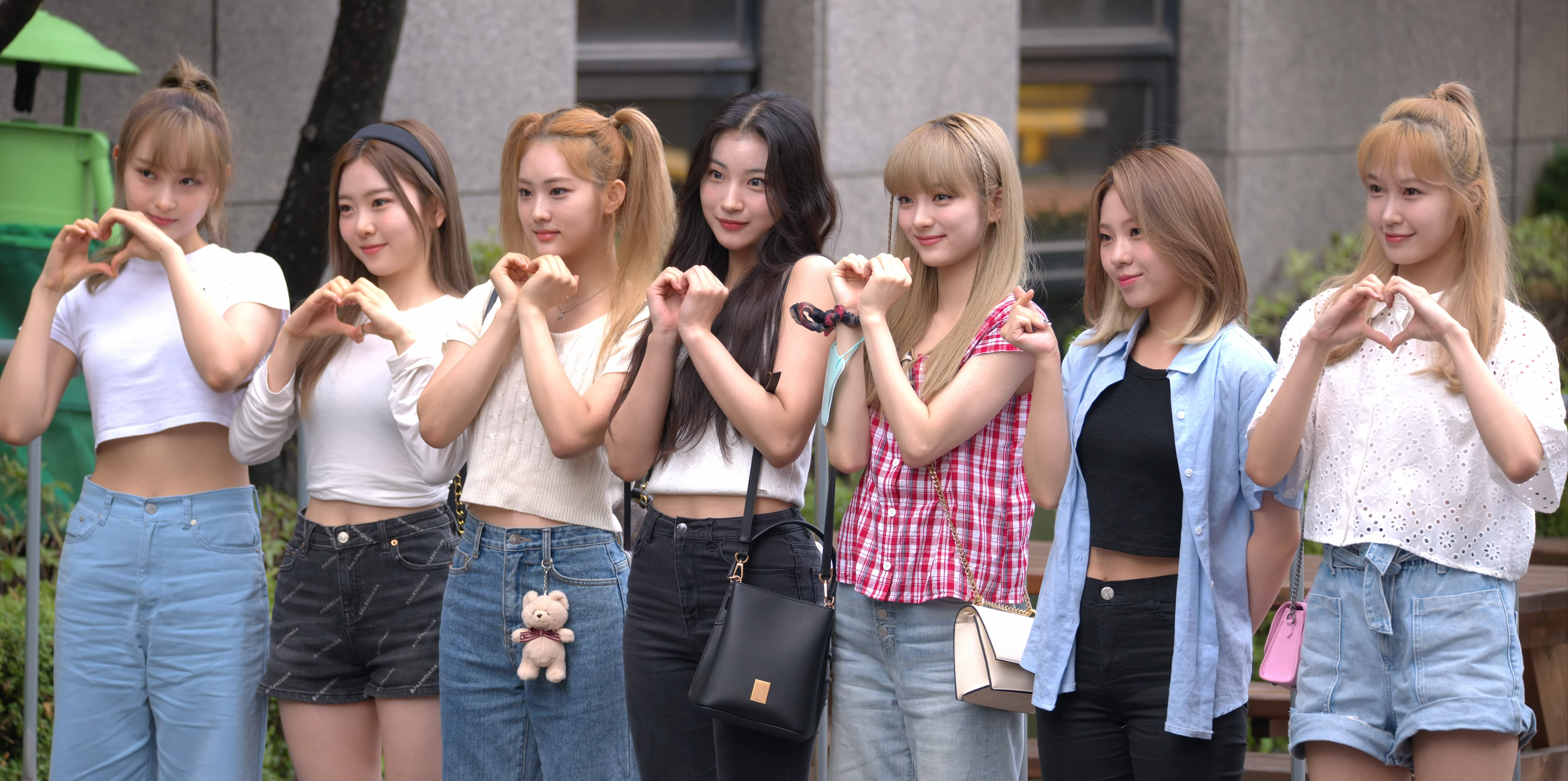
Ichillin' in July 2022, with former member Sohee (first from right)

Ichillin' released their first extended play (EP) Bridge of Dreams on April 27, 2022, with "Play Hide & Seek" serving as the EP's lead single. The EP also features the two digital singles, "Got'Ya" and "Fresh", which were released in the previous year. The group then followed up promotions for "Play Hide & Seek" with one of the EP's tracks "La Luna", beginning June 11 the same year.

On July 15, KM Entertainment announced that member Sohee would be leaving the group, after discussions between the two parties. On October 25, it was announced that Jeong Ji-yoon, who was a contestant on Girls Planet 999, had joined the group.

The group was set to release their third digital single "Draw" on November 3, however, in light of the Seoul Halloween crowd crush, the release was postponed to November 10. The digital single is the group's first release to feature member Jiyoon, and the first release since former member Sohee's departure.

=== 2023: Challenger and I'm On It! ===
Ichillin' released their fourth digital single Challenger on March 23, 2023, with "Alarm" serving as the lead single. The group subsequently released the other track in Challenger, titled "Siren", on May 11. The track was previously inaccessible despite being released alongside "Alarm".

The group released their second EP I'm On It! on July 19, with "Kick-Start" serving as the EP's lead single. The EP also features the previous digital releases "Draw", "Alarm" and "Siren".

=== 2024: Feelin' Hot and Prequel ===
Ichillin' released their fifth digital single "Bite Me" on January 4, 2024, and subsequently their sixth digital single "Demigod" on February 5 the same year. The group then released their third EP Feelin' Hot on March 7, with "On My Lips" serving as the EP's lead single. The EP also features the previous two digital releases "Bite Me" and "Demigod", plus a 2024 re-recording of "La Luna", a song that was released with the group's first EP Bridge of Dreams in 2022.

The group released their seventh digital single Prequel on November 22, with "Official" serving as the lead single.

=== 2025: Wild Cherry ===
Ichillin' released a pre-release single titled "Glass Heart" on July 2, 2025. Subsequently, the group released their fourth EP Wild Cherry on July 31, with "XL (Extra Love)" serving as the EP's lead single. The EP also features the previously released single "Glass Heart".

=== 2026: First sub-unit Ichillin' J ===
On August 19, 2026, KM Entertainment announced the first sub-unit of Ichillin' named Ichillin' J, which consists of members E.Ji, Joonie and Yeju. The sub-unit would release their first digital single "Look at Me!" on September 2.

== Members ==
=== Current ===
- Jiyoon (지윤)
- E.Ji (이지) – Leader
- Jackie (재키)
- Joonie (주니)
- Chaerin (채린)
- Yeju (예주)
- Chowon (초원)

=== Former ===
- Sohee (소희)

== Discography ==
=== Extended plays ===
Title	Details	Peak chart positions	Sales
Title	Details	KOR	Sales
Bridge of Dreams	Released: April 27, 2022; Label: KM Entertainment, Kakao Entertainment; Formats: CD, digital download, streaming; Track listing: 1. "La Luna" (달의 아이); 2. "Play Hide & Seek" (꼭꼭 숨어라); 3. "1+1" (약속해줘요); 4. "Got'Ya"; 5. "Fresh"; 6. "Play Hide & Seek" (꼭꼭 숨어라; Inst.); 7. "1+1" (약속해줘요; Inst.)	63	No Data
I'm On It!	Released: July 19, 2023; Label: KM Entertainment, Kakao Entertainment; Formats: CD, digital download, streaming; Track listing: 1. "Kick-Start" (킥스타트); 2. "Meme" (밈); 3. "Draw"; 4. "Alarm" (알람); 5. "Siren"	22	KOR: 9,347
Feelin' Hot	Released: March 7, 2024; Label: KM Entertainment, Kakao Entertainment; Formats: CD, digital download, streaming; Track listing: 1. "Bite Me"; 2. "Demigod"; 3. "On My Lips"; 4. "La Luna" (달의 아이; 2024 ver.); 5. "On My Lips" (Inst.)	26	KOR: 14,026
Wild Cherry	Released: July 31, 2025; Label: KM Entertainment, Kakao Entertainment; Formats: CD, digital download, streaming; Track listing: 1. "Appetizer"; 2. "XL (Extra Love)"; 3. "Glass Heart"; 4. "XL (Remix Love Drive Ver.)"	25	KOR: 12,979

=== Singles ===
Title	Year	Peak chart positions	Album
Title	Year	KOR Down.	Album
"Got'Ya"	2021	—	Bridge of Dreams
"Fresh"	2021	—	Bridge of Dreams
"Play Hide & Seek" (꼭꼭 숨어라)	2022	198	Bridge of Dreams
"Draw"	2022	154	My Time/I'm On It!
"10 Minutes"	2023	—	The Next: K-pop Girl Groups' VR Battle
"Alarm" (알람)	2023	92	Challenger/I'm On It!
"Siren"	2023	—	Challenger/I'm On It!
"Kick-Start" (킥스타트)	2023	105	I'm On It!
"Bite Me"	2024	—	Feelin' Hot
"Demigod"	2024	116	Feelin' Hot
"On My Lips"	2024	91	Feelin' Hot
"Official"	2024	98	Prequel
"Glass Heart"	2025	123	Wild Cherry
"XL (Extra Love)"	2025	160	Wild Cherry
Ichillin' J (sub-unit)
"Banana (Look at Me!)"	2026	192	Non-album single
"—" denotes releases that did not chart or were not released in that region.

=== Music videos ===
Title	Year	Director	Ref.
"Got'Ya"	2021	Unknown	
"Fresh"	2021	Unknown	
"Play Hide & Seek" (꼭꼭 숨어라)	2022	Unknown	
"Draw (My Time)"	2022	Unknown	
"Alarm" (알람)	2023	Unknown	
"Siren"	2023	Unknown	
"Kick-Start" (킥스타트)	2023	Unknown	
"Bite Me"	2024	Unknown	
"Demigod"	2024	Unknown	
"On My Lips"	2024	Unknown	
"Official"	2024	Chung Kiyoul (PostPattern)	
"XL (Extra Love)"	2025	Chung Kiyoul (PostPattern)	
"Banana (Look at Me!)"	2026	Unknown	

== Filmography ==
=== Television shows ===
Year	Title	Notes	Ref.
2025	A-Idol	Contestant; 1st Place	

=== Web shows ===
Year	Title	Notes	Ref.
2023	Dancing Dol Stage: Season 2	Contestant; 2nd Place	
2023	The Next - K-pop Girl Groups' VR Battle	Contestant; 1st Place	

== Concerts ==
- Your Time (2022)

== Ambassadorship ==
- Honorary Ambassador for Kosunnae Abandoned Animal Welfare Association (2022)

== Awards and nominations ==
Name of the award ceremony, year presented, category, nominee of the award, and the result of the nomination
Award ceremony	Year	Category	Nominee / Work	Result	Ref.
Korea Cable TV Awards	2023	Cable TV Star Award – Idol	Ichillin'	Won	
