= ILY:1 =

South Korean girl group

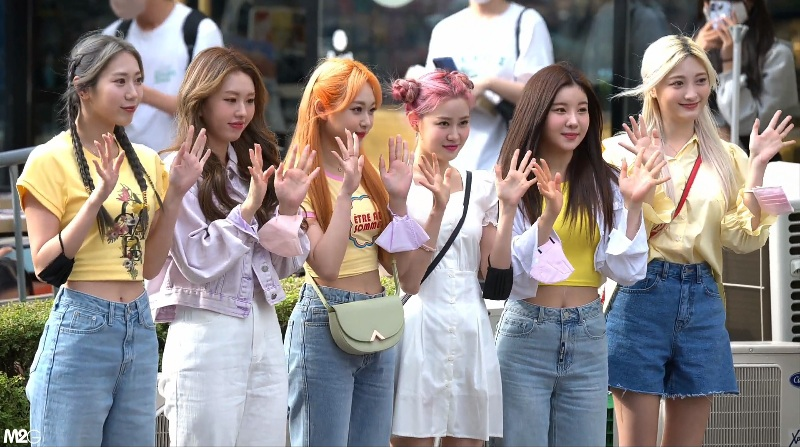
- ILY:1 on August 19, 2022; From L–R: Elva, Hana, Ririka, Ara, Nayu, Rona

Background information
- Origin: Seoul, South Korea
- Genre: K-pop
- Years active: 2022–2024
- Labels: FC ENM & Newways Company
- Members: Nayu; Hana; Ara; Rona; Ririka; Elva

ILY:1 (/aɪliːwʌn/; Korean: 아일리원; RR: Ailliwon) is a South Korean girl group formed by FC ENM. The group consists of six members: Hana, Ara, Rona, Ririka, Nayu, and Elva. They made their debut on April 4, 2022 with their single album Love in Bloom.

== Name ==
The group name 'ILY:1' is a combination of 'I' as in oneself and '-ly' meaning 'I like myself'. The '1' represents the individual members with their unique characteristics to full a whole group. ILY is also an acronym for "I love you".

== History ==
=== Pre-debut ===
In 2018, Rona was a trainee of TPE48 (currently known as AKB48 Team TP).

In 2020, Ririka was a contestant on the Japanese reality survival show Nizi Project, but was eliminated.

Hana and Ririka were members of the Japanese-Korean project girl group Orange Latte, the group was active for a period of time and disbanded in 2021. In the same year, Hana, Rona, Ririka and Ara were contestants on the reality survival show Girls Planet 999 but did not make it into the final debut lineup.

=== 2022–present: Debut with Love in Bloom, Que Sera Sera and Twinkle, Twinkle ===
On January 5, 2022, ILY:1 was confirmed to make their official debut in March 2022. ILY:1 was originally scheduled to debut on March 15, 2022, releasing their first single album Love in Bloom, as well as hold their first fan showcase on the same day and release pre-release single "Azalea" on March 11, 2022. However, on March 11, FC ENM announced the postponement of the debut on April 4 due to the aftermath of COVID-19.

On April 4, 2022, ILY:1 officially debuted with the debut single album Love in Bloom led by the title of the same name.

On July 19, 2022, ILY:1 released their second single album Que Sera Sera led by the title of the same name.

On January 5, 2023, ILY:1 released their first extended play A Dream Of ILY:1 led by the title track "Twinkle, Twinkle".

On April 4, 2024, ILY:1 released the single "I My Me Mine."

On July 22, 2024, ILY:1 announced their third mini album illang:Firework, which was released on August 20. In addition, FC ENM signed a joint management agreement with Newways Company, so they could promote the group better.

== Members ==
Adapted from their Naver profile.

- Nayu (나유) – leader
- Hana (하나)
- Ara (아라)
- Rona (로나)
- Ririka (리리카)
- Elva (엘바)

== Discography ==
=== Extended plays ===
List of extended plays, showing selected details, selected chart positions, and sales figures
Title	Details	Peak chart positions	Sales
Title	Details	KOR	Sales
A Dream of ILY:1	Released: January 5, 2023; Label: FC ENM; Formats: CD, digital download, streaming; Track list: 1. "Twinkle, Twinkle" (별꽃동화); 2. "Secret Recipe"; 3. "Tasty"; 4. "Thanks To..."; 5. "Twinkle, Twinkle" (별꽃동화) (Inst.); 6. "Secret Recipe" (Inst.); 7. "Tasty" (Inst.); 8. "Thanks To..." (Inst.)	38	KOR: 6,804
New Chapter	Released: July 25, 2023; Label: FC ENM; Formats: CD, digital download, streaming; Track list: 1. "Shining Sky"; 2. "Blossom" (꽃이 피었습니다); 3. "My Color"	49	KOR: 2,560
Illang: Firework	Released: August 20, 2024; Label: FC ENM; Formats: CD, digital download, streaming; Track list: 1. "Illang (Firework)"; 2. "Are You Happy Now?"; 3. "Ocean View"; 4. "I My Me Mine"; 5. "Illang (Firework)" (instrumental); 6. "Are You Happy Now?" (instrumental); 7. "Ocean View" (instrumental); 8. "I My Me Mine" (instrumental)	21	KOR: 7,653

=== Single albums ===
Title	Details	Peak chart positions	Sales
Title	Details	KOR	Sales
Love in Bloom	Released: April 4, 2022; Label: FC ENM; Formats: CD, digital download, streaming; Track list: 1. "Azalea" (아젤리아); 2. "Love in Bloom" (사랑아 피어라); 3. "Azalea" (아젤리아) (Inst.); 4. "Love in Bloom" (사랑아 피어라) (Inst.)	17	KOR: 11,133
Que Sera Sera	Released: July 19, 2022; Label: FC ENM; Formats: CD, digital download, streaming; Track list: 1. "Que Sera Sera" (케세라세라); 2. "Que Sera Sera" (케세라세라) (Inst.)	35	KOR: 6,490
To My Boyfriend	Released October 24, 2023; Label: FC ENM; Formats: digital download, streaming; Track listing: 1. "To My Boyfriend" (내 남자친구에게); 2. "To My Boyfriend (English version); 3. "To My Boyfriend" (내 남자친구에게; instrumental)	—N/a	—N/a

=== Singles ===
List of singles, showing year released, chart positions, and album name
Title	Year	Peak chart positions		Album
Title	Year	KOR Down.	US World	Album
"Love in Bloom" (사랑아 피어라)	2022	121	—	Love in Bloom
"Que Sera Sera" (케세라세라)	2022	142	6	Que Sera Sera
"Thanks To..."	2022	—	—	A Dream of ILY:1
"Twinkle, Twinkle" (별꽃동화)	2023	103	10	A Dream of ILY:1
"My Color"	2023	—	—	New Chapter
"To My Boyfriend"	2023	112	—	Non-album single
"IMMM"	2024	136	—	Illang: Firework
"Illang (Firework)"	2024	98	—	Illang: Firework

== Videography ==
=== Music videos ===
Title	Year	Director(s)	Ref.
"Love in Bloom"	2022	Lee Sagan (Zanybros)	
"Que Sera Sera"	2022	Lee Sagan (Zanybros)	
"Twinkle Twinkle"	2023	ZanyBros	
"My Color"	2023	ZanyBros	
"To My Boyfriend"	2023	Unknown	
"Blossom"	2023	Zanybros	
"I My Me Mine"	2024	Unknown	
"Illang (Firework)"	2024	Zanybros	

== Filmography ==
=== Web shows ===
Year	Title	Notes	Ref.
2022	ILY:0	Pre-debut reality show	
2022	Dancing Dol: Season 2	Contestant	

== Awards and nominations ==
Name of the award ceremony, year presented, award category, nominee(s) of the award, and the result of the nomination
Award ceremony	Year	Category	Nominee(s)/work(s)	Result	Ref.
Hanteo Music Awards	2023	Rookie of the Year (Female Category)	ILY:1	Nominated	
2024 Korea Best Brand Awards-Korea Hallyu Entertainment Awards	2024	Rookie of the Year Idol Group Award	ILY:1	Won	
