= Madein =

South Korean girl group

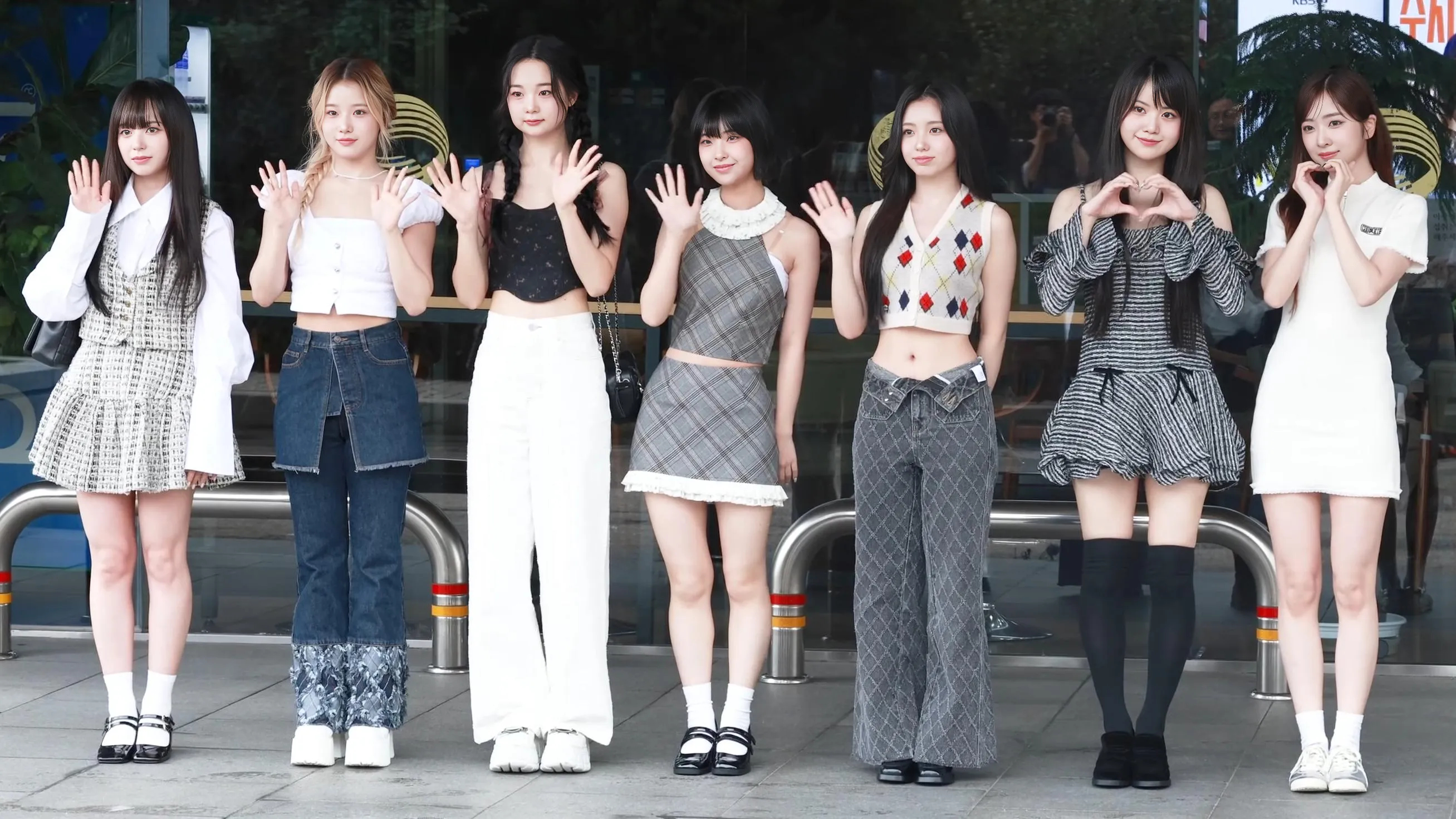
- Madein in September 2024; From left to right: Mashiro, Suhye, Gaeun, Nagomi, Yeseo, Serina, and MiU

Background information
- Also known as: LimeLight (2022–2024)
- Origin: Seoul, South Korea
- Genres: K-pop; bubblegum pop; dance pop; teen pop
- Years active: 2022–present
- Labels: 143 Entertainment; B Zone
- Spinoffs: Madein S
- Members: Mashiro; MiU; Serina; Nagomi
- Past members: Gaeun; Suhye; Yeseo
- Website: madein-official.net

Korean name
- Hangul: 메이딘
Transcriptions
- Revised Romanization: Meidin
- McCune–Reischauer: Meidin

Japanese name
- Katakana: メイディン
Transcriptions
- Revised Hepburn: Meidin

Madein (Korean: 메이딘; RR: Meidin), formerly known as LimeLight (라임라잇), is a South Korean girl group formed by 143 Entertainment. The group consists of MiU, Mashiro, Serina, and Nagomi.

Madein originally debuted under the name LimeLight with a three-member line-up of MiU, Suhye, and Gaeun on February 17, 2023. The group announced their rearrangement in 2024 under the new name Madein, with four new members; adding former Kep1er members Mashiro and Yeseo, and Produce 101 Japan The Girls contestants Serina Saito and Nagomi Abe. Gaeun departed from the group in November 2024 amid allegations that she was the target of sexual harassment by the CEO of the group's agency. Suhye and Yeseo departed from the group in December 2025.

== History ==
=== Pre-debut activities ===
Some members have previously been involved in the entertainment industry prior to joining the group. MiU was a contestant on the reality survival show Girls Planet 999 but did not make it into the final debut lineup. MiU was a tarento and model under N.D Promotion. She also appeared in some music videos and adverts, and was a model for Popteen. Kim Su-hye was a contestant on the reality survival show My Teenage Girl where she ranked 22nd and did not make it into the final debut lineup. Saito Serina and Abe Nagomi were contestants on the reality survival show Produce 101 Japan The Girls where Serina ranked 21st and Nagomi ranked 23rd, but did not make it into the final debut lineup. Oh Gaeun and MiU appeared as models for a magazine pictorial for Alexander Wang and MAPS.

=== 2022–2024: Pre-debut activities and debut as LimeLight ===
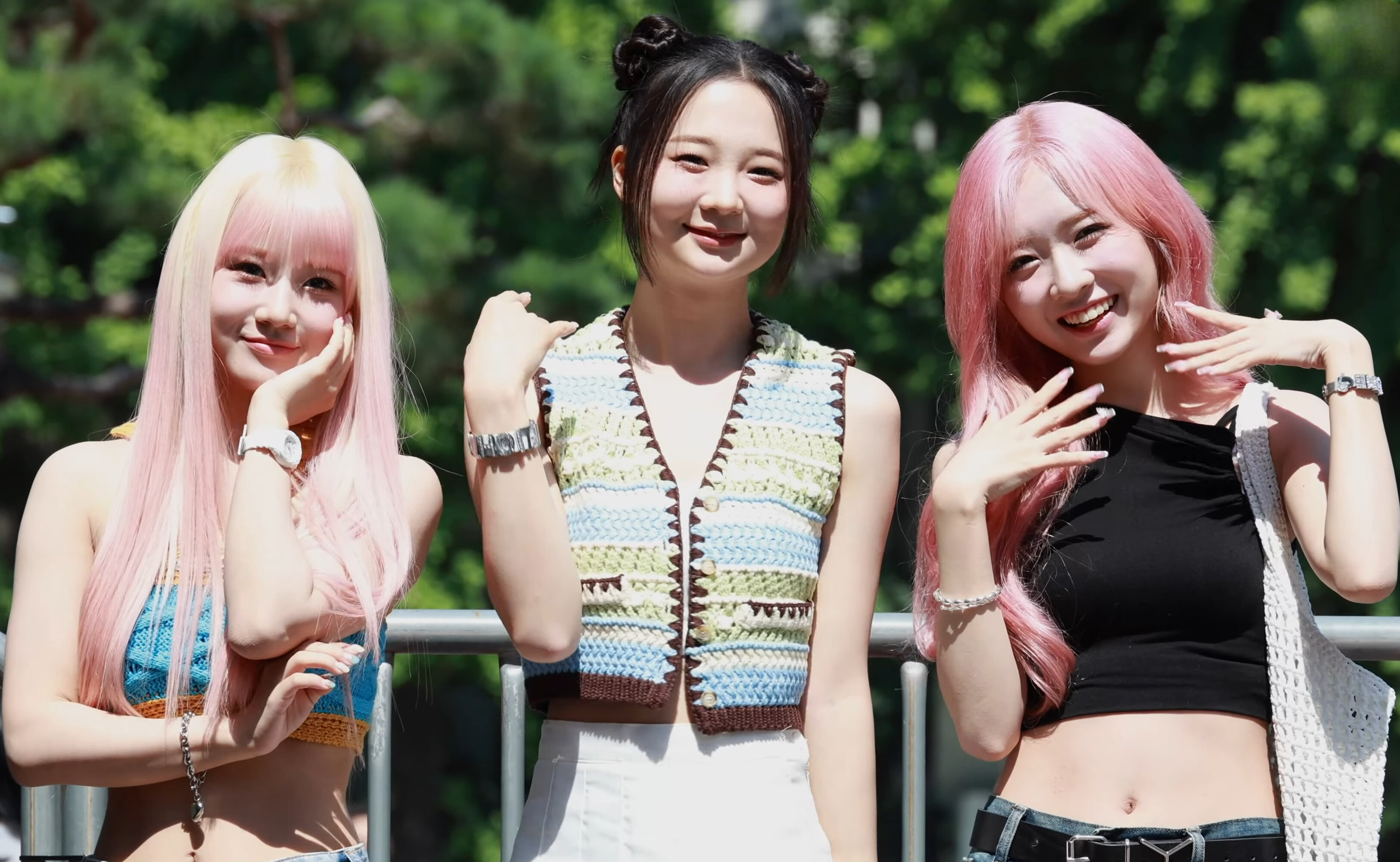
LimeLight members in September 2023 (L-R: Suhye, Gaeun, MiU)

On January 15, 2022, it was announced that MiU has signed a contract with 143 Entertainment, and is expected to debut in their upcoming girl group. On April 15, 2022, it was announced that Kim Su-hye has also signed a contract with 143 Entertainment. On August 16, 2022, 143 Entertainment announced that the group will be an expandable group with an unlimited number of members. The group will begin their activities with a pre-debut reality show Lululala and release an EP after the reality show ends. Kang Ye-seo and Mashiro Sakamoto were expected to join the group after the contract expiration of Kep1er. On September 27, LimeLight with the first three members: MiU, Su-hye, and Gaeun had an early showcase for their pre-debut EP at Ilji Art Hall in Gangnam, Seoul. On the same day, they released a music video for their first single "Starlight". The music video for their second single "Eye to Eye" was released the next day. On September 29, their self-titled pre-debut EP was released into various music platforms.

On February 17, 2023, the group made their official debut with their EP Love & Happiness. The music video for the lead single "Honestly", which was released early on February 14, featuring iKon's Jay, whose group recently signed with their respective agency, and Bang Jae-min. On August 4, 2023, The group made their first comeback with their single album Madeleine. On December 27, 2023, it was announced that the group's next EP Last Dance will be their last as a trio. The group plans to re-organize and add more members. On January 11, 2024, the group made their comeback with their third extended play Last Dance alongside its lead single "Ta-Da!".

=== 2024–present: Re-debut as Madein ===
On July 15, 2024, all SNS accounts belonging to LimeLight were rebranded as Madein, indicating that the group would start fresh under the group name Madein, with additional members. On July 29, all seven members were introduced, with Yeseo, Mashiro, Serina, and Nagomi joining the group. On August 14, it was announced that the group would be making their debut on September 3, 2024, with the extended play (EP) titled Rise (상승). The EP was released digitally on September 3 and physically 17 days later. On September 24, it was reported that Madein signed contract with B Zone for their Japanese activities. Madein held their first-ever Japanese fan concert, titled "Madein Adventure 2024" on October 5 and 6 at the Orix Theater.

On November 11, 143 Entertainment announced that Gaeun would temporarily halt her activities with Madein for health reasons. Gaeun had also deleted all posts on her personal social media accounts and unfollowed her agency's and executive producer's accounts. An allegation that Gaeun had faced sexual harassment from the agency's CEO surfaced through a November 22 report by JBTC's Case Chief television programme, which 143 Entertainment denied the following day. Gaeun officially left the group on November 29, with 143 Entertainment citing "personal circumstances" as the reason for her departure while again denying the allegations of sexual harassment. Gaeun's exclusive contact with the agency remained in effect.

In January 2025, Madein was reorganised as a 6-member girl group and was confirmed to have a new release in February. Their first single album, Madein Forever, was released on February 14, featuring double lead singles "Saturn" and "Love, Afraid". "Saturn" contains a metaphor for a relationship that unfolds around Saturn, which looks at the Sun from afar. "Love, Afraid" was a remake of Deux's unreleased song "Love, Fear".

On May 14, it was announced that Suhye would halt her activities due to personal reasons. On July 31, it was announced that the group's first subunit, Madein S, would be debuting in August, consisting of Mashiro, MiU, Serina, and Nagomi. On December 26, it was confirmed that Suhye and Yeseo have officially departed from the group.

In April 2025, a sexual harassment lawsuit was filed by Gaeun against the agency's CEO. A temporary injunction on her exclusive contract was obtained on 31 July 2026.

== Members ==
Current members

- MiU (ミユ; 미유; 2022–present)
- Mashiro (マシロ; 마시로; 2024–present)
- Serina (セリナ; 세리나; 2024–present)
- Nagomi (ナゴミ; 나고미; 2024–present)

Former members

- Gaeun (가은; 2022–2024)
- Suhye (수혜; 2022–2025)
- Yeseo (예서; 2024–2025)

== Discography ==
=== As LimeLight ===
==== Extended plays ====
List of extended plays, showing selected details, selected chart positions, and sales figures
Title	Details	Peak chart positions	Sales
Title	Details	KOR	Sales
Limelight	Released: September 29, 2022; Label: 143 Entertainment; Formats: CD, digital download, streaming; Track listing: 1. "StarLight"; 2. "Eye to Eye"; 3. "Paradise"; 4. "Cha Cha"; 5. "StarLight" (a cappella); 6. "Eye to Eye" (a cappella); 7. "StarLight" (instrumental); 8. "Eye to Eye" (instrumental)	35	KOR: 8,755
Love & Happiness	Released: February 17, 2023; Label: 143 Entertainment; Formats: CD, digital download, streaming; Track listing: 1. "Honestly"; 2. "Blanc Noir"; 3. "Crystal"; 4. "Honestly" (instrumental); 5. "Blanc Noir" (instrumental); 6. "Crystal" (instrumental); 7. "Honestly" (a cappella); 8. "Blanc Noir" (a cappella); 9. "Crystal" (a cappella)	9	KOR: 39,241
Last Dance	Released: January 11, 2024; Label: 143 Entertainment; Formats: CD, digital download, streaming; Track listing: 1. "Baby, Maybe Crazy"; 2. "Ta Da!"; 3. "Twenty Twenty" (Korean vs./Miu's solo); 4. "Twenty Twenty" (Japanese vs./Miu's solo); 5. "If U Know, U Know" (Suhye's solo); 6. "If U Know, U Know" (Suhye's solo/Guitar vs.); 7. "Twenty Twenty" (electric piano vs. /Miu's solo); 8. "Baby, Maybe Crazy" (a cappella); 9. "Blanc Noir" (a cappella); 10. "Ta Da!" (a cappella); 11. "If U Know, U Know" (Suhye's solo/a cappella vs.); 12. "Twenty Twenty" (a cappella Korean vs. /Miu's solo); 13. "Twenty Twenty" (a cappella Japanese vs. /Miu's solo); 14. "Baby, Maybe Crazy" (instrumental); 15. "Ta Da!" (instrumental); 16. "If U Know, U Know" (Suhye's solo/instrumental vs.); 17. "If U Know, U Know" (Suhye's solo/ guitar instrumental vs.); 18. "Twenty Twenty" (electric piano instrumental vs./Miu's solo)	6	KOR: 43,841

==== Single albums ====
List of single albums, showing selected details, selected chart positions, and sales figures
Title	Details	Peak chart positions	Sales
Title	Details	KOR	Sales
Madeleine	Released: August 4, 2023; Label: 143 Entertainment; Formats: CD, digital download, streaming; Track listing: 1. "Madeleine"; 2. "Madeleine" (Instrumental); 3. "Madeleine" (Acapella)	23	KOR: 10,500

==== Singles ====
List of singles, showing year released, selected chart positions, and name of the album
Title	Year	Peak chart positions	Album
Title	Year	KOR DL	Album
"Starlight"	2022	173	Limelight
"Eye to Eye"	2022	—	Limelight
"Honestly"	2023	169	Love & Happiness
"Madeleine"	2023	173	Madeleine
"Ta-Da!"	2024	100	Last Dance

=== As Madein ===
==== Extended plays ====
List of extended plays, showing selected details, selected chart positions, and sales figures
Title	Details	Peak chart positions		Sales
Title	Details	KOR	JPN Hot	Sales
Rise (상승)	Released: September 3, 2024; Label: 143 Entertainment; Formats: CD, digital download, streaming; Track listing: 1. "Uno"; 2. "Dadarida"; 3. "Dopamine"; 4. "Timeline"	6	68	KOR: 54,698; JPN: 200 (dig.)

==== Single albums ====
List of single albums, showing selected details, selected chart positions, and sales figures
Title	Details	Peak chart positions	Sales
Title	Details	KOR	Sales
Madein Forever	Released: February 14, 2025; Label: 143 Entertainment; Formats: CD, digital download, streaming; Track listing: 1. "Saturn"; 2. "Love, Afraid" (사랑, 두려움); 3. "Saturn" (Acapella); 4. "Love, Afraid" (사랑, 두려움; Acapella); 5. "Saturn" (Instrumental); 6. "Love, Afraid" (사랑, 두려움; Instrumental)	5	KOR: 59,611
Girl Meets Boy	Released: February 9, 2026; Label: 143 Entertainment; Formats: CD, digital download, streaming; Track listing: 1. "Super Obvious" (안 봐도 비디오); 2. "Pung!"; 3. "Super Obvious" (안 봐도 비디오; Acapella); 4. "Pung!" (Acapella); 5. "Super Obvious" (안 봐도 비디오; Instrumental); 6. "Pung!" (Instrumental)	8	KOR: 18,045

==== Singles ====
List of singles, showing year released, selected chart positions, and name of the album
Title	Year	Peak chart positions	Album
Title	Year	KOR DL	Album
"Uno"	2024	153	Rise
"Love, Afraid" (사랑, 두려움)	2025	135	Madein Forever
"Saturn"	2025	—	Madein Forever
"Super Obvious" (안 봐도 비디오)	2026	88	Girl Meets Boy
"—" denotes a recording that did not chart or was not released in that region.

=== Madein S ===
==== Single albums ====
List of single albums, showing selected details, selected chart positions, and sales figures
Title	Details	Peak chart positions	Sales
Title	Details	KOR	Sales
Made in Blue	Released: August 14, 2025; Label: 143 Entertainment; Formats: CD, digital download, streaming; Track listing: 1. "Blue"	10	KOR: 37,583

==== Singles ====
List of singles, showing year released, selected chart positions, and name of the album
Title	Year	Peak chart positions	Album
Title	Year	KOR DL	Album
"Blue"	2025	171	Made in Blue

== Videography ==
=== Music videos ===
List of music videos, showing year released, name of the directors, and duration
Title	Year	Director(s)	Duration	Ref.
As LimeLight
"Starlight"	2022	Lee Yu-young, Lee Jae-hyun (SNP Film)	3:35	
"Eye to Eye"	2022	Lee Yu-young, Lee Jae-hyun (SNP Film)	3:35	
"Paradise"	2022	Lee Yu-young, Lee Jae-hyun (SNP Film)	3:13	
"Chacha"	2022	Lee Yu-young, Lee Jae-hyun (SNP Film)	3:16	
"Honestly"	2023	Lee Yu-young, Lee Jae-hyun (SNP Film)	3:14	
"Blanc Noir"	2023	Unknown	3:46	
"Madeleine"	2023	Lee Yu-young, Lee Jae-hyun (SNP Film)	3:23	
"Ta-Da!"	2024	Lee Yu-young, Lee Jae-hyun (SNP Film)	4:03	
"Twenty Twenty"	2024	Lee Yu-young, Lee Jae-hyun (SNP Film)	3:11	
As Madein
"Uno"	2024	John H. Lee	3:42	
"Dadarida"	2024	Lee Yu-young, Lee Jae-hyun (SNP Film)	2:39	
"Dopamine"	2024	Lee Yu-young, Lee Jae-hyun (SNP Film)	3:05	
"Saturn"	2025	Lee Yu-young, Lee Jae-hyun (SNP Film)	2:44	
"Love, Afraid" (사랑, 두려움)	2025	Lee Yu-young, Lee Jae-hyun (SNP Film)	3:21	
"Super Obvious" (안 봐도 비디오)	2026	Mingi Kang (Aarch Film)	3:18	
"Pung!"	2026	Unknown	2:42	

== Filmography ==
=== Reality shows ===
Year	Title	Notes	Ref.
2022	Lululala	Pre-debut reality show	
2022	LimeLight Land	Debut reality show	

== Awards and nominations ==
Name of the award ceremony, year presented, award category, nominee(s) of the award, and the result of the nomination
Award ceremony	Year	Category	Nominee(s)/work(s)	Result	Ref.
Hanteo Music Awards	2023	Rookie of the Year (Female Category)	LimeLight	Nominated	
MAMA Awards	2023	Artist of the Year	LimeLight	Nominated	
MAMA Awards	2023	Best New Female Artist	LimeLight	Nominated	
MAMA Awards	2023	Album of the Year	Love & Happiness	Nominated	
Seoul Music Awards	2025	Rookie of the Year	Madein	Nominated	
