= Fu Yaning =

Chinese singer and actress

- Born: July 14, 1997 (age 28); Beijing, China
- Other names: Yenny; Jessie Fu
- Education: Communication University of China
- Occupations: Singer; actress
- Years active: 2020–present
- Agent: Gramarie
- Musical career
- Genres: Mandopop
- Instrument: Vocals
- Label: Gramarie

Chinese name
- Simplified Chinese: 符雅凝
- Hanyu Pinyin: Fú Yǎníng

Fu Yaning (Chinese: 符雅凝; pinyin: Fú Yǎníng, born July 14, 1997), also known as Yenny, is a Chinese singer and actress under Gramarie. She is known for her participation in the survival reality shows Youth With You 2 and Girls Planet 999. On April 20, 2022, she released her debut extended play (EP), Ning.

== Career ==
=== 2020–present: Career beginnings and transition to acting ===
From March to May, Fu represented Gramarie Entertainment, alongside Zhang Luofei and Ge Xinyi on the girl group survival reality television show Youth With You 2. She was eliminated in Episode 16 and eventually placed 53rd. On June 20, Fu released the single "Navigator's Daughter". On October 15, she released another single titled "I'm Done", which was also co-written by her.

In March 2021, Fu sang the opening song of the Chinese drama Unusual Idol Love. From August to October, Fu also participated in the Mnet survival show Girls Planet 999 as one of the program's 33 Chinese contestants. However, she was eliminated during the finale, after ranking 12th overall with 560,606 votes. After the show, she released the track "Starlight". In December, Fu made her acting debut in a supporting role in the Chinese drama, My Heart. She also played the role of An Xiaoluo in the drama The Flowers are Blooming.

Fu made her official debut with the single "Ning" on April 20, 2022.

== Discography ==
=== Singles ===
List of singles, showing year released and name of the album
Title	Year	Album
As lead artist
"Navigator's Daughter" (with Ailia)	2020	Non-album singles
"I'm Done"	2020	Non-album singles
"Starlight" (星之海)	2021	Non-album singles
"Ning" (凝)	2022	Non-album singles
"Light it Up" (燃)	2022	Non-album singles
"Why Not"	2024	Non-album singles
As featured artist
"Ladybug" (逐) (with Juvenile)	2022	Non-album single

=== Soundtrack appearances ===
List of soundtrack appearances, showing year released and name of the album
Title	Year	Album
"Turning On" (正在启动)	2021	Unusual Idol Love OST

=== Composition credits ===
List of songs written and co-written, showing year released, artist name, and name of the album
Title	Year	Artist	Album	Credited
"I'm Done"	2020	Fu Yaning	Non-album singles	Yes
"Ning"	2022	Fu Yaning	Non-album singles	Yes

== Filmography ==
=== Web series ===
Year	Title	Role	Ref.
2024	Elegant Letter Paper	Princess Ming You	
2025	Countdown to Love	Xu Nianchu	
2025	Dear Beloved	Shen Xitang	
2025	The Medical Consort's Handbook	Su Qing / Jiang Mengli	
2025	Zhao Yang Si Wo	Yumi	
2026	Elegy of Zhaoli	Jiang Li	
TBA	Qing Qiu Yao Lang		

=== Television series ===
Year	Title	Role	Notes	Ref.
2021	My Heart	Bai He		
2021	The Flowers are Blooming	An Xiaoluo		

=== Television shows ===
Year	Title	Role	Notes	Ref.
2020	Youth With You 2	Contestant	Finished 53rd	
2021	Girls Planet 999	Contestant	Finished 12th	

== Awards and nominations ==
Name of the award ceremony, year presented, award category, nominee(s) of the award and the result of the nomination
Award	Year	Category	Nominee(s)/Work(s)	Result	Ref.
Sino Fashion Style Award	2021	New Artist of the Year	Fu Yaning	Won	
