= Geenius =

South Korean girl group

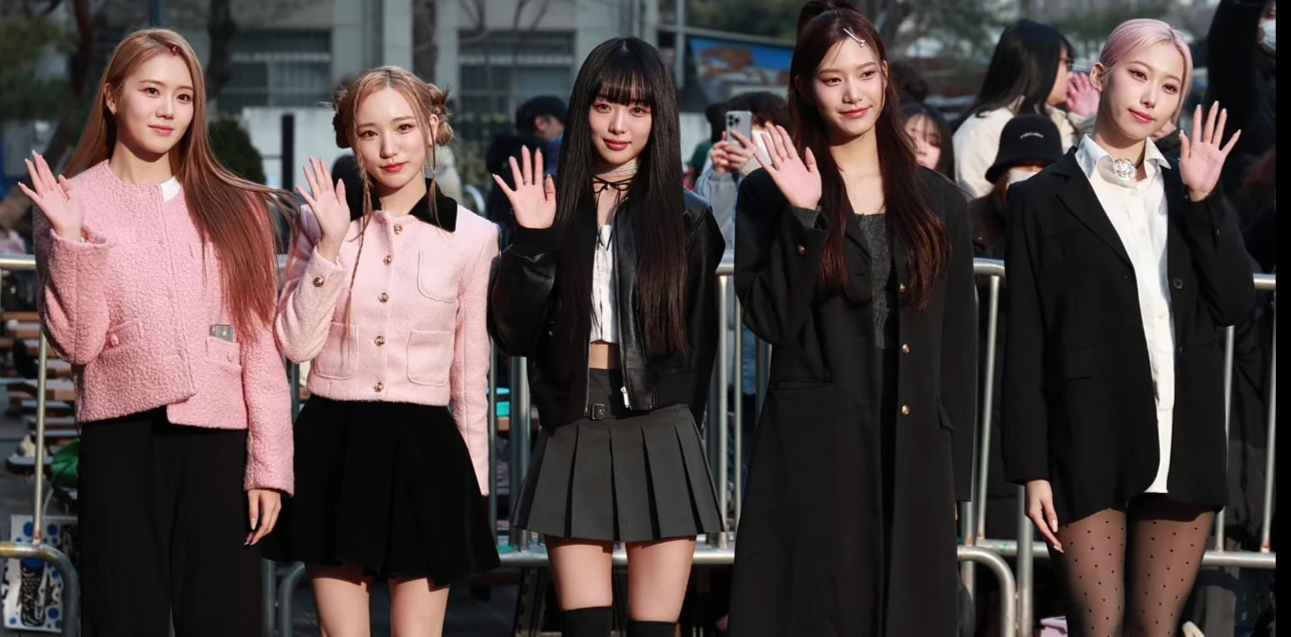
- Geenius in February 2024; L–R: Zoe, Sion, Yeyoung, Mika, and Andamiro.

Background information
- Origin: Seoul, South Korea
- Genre: K-pop
- Years active: 2024–present
- Label: HOMe
- Members: Yeyoung; Sion; Mika; Zoe; Andamiro

Geenius (Korean: 지니어스; RR: Jinieoseu) is a South Korean girl group under HOMe. The group consists of five members: Yeyoung, Sion, Mika, Zoe, and Andamiro. They made their debut on January 5, 2024, with the digital single "Voyage".

== History ==
=== 2017–2023: Pre-debut activities ===
Some members have previously been involved in the entertainment industry prior to joining the group. Zoe participated in the JTBC's survival reality series Mix Nine. She was eliminated in episode 10 after ranking 39th place. Yeyoung and Sion were contestants on the reality survival show Girls Planet 999, Sion was eliminated in episode 5, ranking K28, while Yeyoung was eliminated in episode 8, ranking K17, unable to debut into the final debut lineup.

On December 20, 2023, in a news release, it was revealed the agency Sure Place would be debuting a new girl group, named Geenius, and opened their own SNS accounts. Through the SNS accounts, a coming soon teaser indicated that they are ready to debut soon. The next day, they began revealing their members as leader Yeyoung, Sion, Mika, Zoe and maknae Andamiro. Along with the members, they revealed their debut date as January 5, 2024 with the digital single "Voyage".

While in the first week of their pre-debut stage, it was reported that the group was previously known as Bebez at Blockberry Creative, but all members left the agency after their exclusive contracts expired and thus signed new contracts with Sure Place. However, just a few days prior to their 2024 debut, recent news reports revealed that their actual agency is HOMe, a sub-label under Sure Place created by ex-Blockberry creative directors.

=== 2024–present: Debut with Voyage ===
On December 20, 2023, it was announced that they would make their debut on January 5, 2024 with the digital single "Voyage".

== Members ==
- Yeyoung (예영)
- Sion (시온)
- Mika (미카)
- Zoe (조에)
- Andamiro (안다미로)

== Discography ==
=== Singles ===
List of singles, with showing year released, selected chart positions and album name
Title	Year	Peak chart positions	Album
Title	Year	KOR Down.	Album
"Voyage"	2024	–	Non-album singles
"—" denotes a recording that did not chart or was not released in that region.

== Videography ==
=== Music videos ===
Title	Year	Director(s)	Ref.
"Voyage"	2024	The Waves	
