= Girls Planet 999 =

2021 South Korean reality competition show

- Genre: Reality competition
- Presented by: Yeo Jin-goo
- Opening theme: "O.O.O (Over&Over&Over)" by Girls Planet 999
- Country of origin: South Korea
- Original languages: Korean; Chinese; Japanese
- No. of episodes: 12 (list of episodes)

Production
- Production location: South Korea
- Running time: 85–150 minutes; 182 minutes (Finale)
- Production companies: CJ ENM; NCSoft; Studio Take One (Note: A subsidiary of CJ ENM)

Original release
- Network: Mnet
- Release: August 6 – October 22, 2021

Related
- Boys Planet (2023)

Girls Planet 999

Chinese name
- Traditional Chinese: 少女星球999：少女們的盛典
- Simplified Chinese: 少女星球999：少女们的盛典
Transcriptions
Standard Mandarin
- Hanyu Pinyin: Shàonǚ Xīngqiú 999: Shàonǚmen de Shèngdiǎn
- Bopomofo: ㄕㄠˋㄋㄩˇ ㄒ丨ㄥㄑ丨ㄡˊ 999: ㄕㄠˋ ㄋㄩˇㄇㄣ˙ ㄉㄜ˙ ㄕㄥˋ ㄉ丨ㄢˇ
- Wade–Giles: Shao^{4}-nü^{3} Hsing^{1}-Chʽiu^{2} 999： Shao^{4}-nü^{3}-Men Te Sheng^{4}-Tien^{3}

Korean name
- Hangul: 걸스플래닛999: 소녀대전
- Hanja: 걸스플래닛999：少女大典
Transcriptions
- Revised Romanization: Geolseu Peullaenit 999: Sonyeo Daejeon
- McCune–Reischauer: Kŏlsŭ P'ŭllaenit 999: Sonyŏ Taejŏn

Japanese name
- Kanji: ガールズプラネット999：少女祭典
- Kana: ガールズプラネット999：しょうじょさいてん
Transcriptions
- Romanization: Gāruzu Puranetto 999: Shōjo Saiten
- Nihon-shiki: Gâruzu Puranetto 999: Syôzyo Saiten

Girls Planet 999 (Korean: 걸스플래닛999: 소녀대전) is a 2021 South Korean reality competition show created by Mnet. It premiered on August 6, 2021, and was originally broadcast every Friday at 8:20 PM KST for the first eleven episodes until its finale on October 22, which was broadcast live at 8 PM KST. It was aired on the Mnet channel, IQIYI, AbemaTV, tvN Asia, or YouTube depending on the viewer's region.

A production by Mnet's parent company CJ E&M and its subsidiary Studio Take One, as well as in collaboration with game developer and publisher NCSoft, the aim of the competition was to debut a new 9-member K-pop girl group consisting of trainees and idols from China, (Note: Contestants from Hong Kong and Taiwan are categorized under China.) Japan, and South Korea. Auditions for the competition were held from January to February 2021.

Out of 13,000 applicants, 99 final contestants were selected. These 99 contestants were split equally into three groups; the K-Group, C-Group and the J-Group.

In the finale on October 22, 2021, which was broadcast live, the show announced the final 9 members who would debut as Kep1er.

A second season named Boys Planet featured an all male contestants premiered on February 2, 2023 featuring male trainees and idols.

== Concept and format ==
The "planet" theme of the show was derived from a new collaboration between Mnet and NCSoft's new platform called Universe which is centered around K-pop. It allowed votes from other countries outside of the participating three, (Note: 50% of votes will come from South Korea while the remaining 50% will be the total number of international votes which includes China and Japan.) and also hosted other promotional content for the show.

The show initially grouped the girls into groups of 3 which were called "cells." An entire cell of girls could be eliminated all at once, hence increasing the risk of elimination. To counteract this, the "Planet Top 9" is introduced. Contestants who are selected or voted to be the Planet Top 9 (designated P1 to P9) can reorganize cells to try and lower the chances of elimination. Cells were disbanded after the first elimination round. At the end of the competition, the top 9 most-voted contestants debuted regardless of nationality.

== Promotion and broadcast ==
Girls Planet 999 promotional poster.

The show, as well as its auditions, was first announced on January 11, 2021, through Mnet. Yeo Jin-goo was announced as the show's presenter on June 8, followed by the reveal of the mentors and the name of the show's opening theme later that same month. More promotional clips from the show were broadcast that month on Mnet.

The show's premiere date of August 6, 2021, was confirmed through a teaser video released on July 6, 2021. Another teaser video showcasing the faces of the 99 contestants was released on July 8, along with a promotional poster.

The theme song, "O.O.O (Over&Over&Over)," was released on July 12, 2021, accompanied by a performance by the Korean group with Kim Dayeon as Center. Another version of the performance featuring the Chinese group was released on July 14 with Shen Xiaoting as Center. The Japanese group's version was released on July 16 with Hikaru Ezaki as Center. The full version containing all three groups was released on July 29 during M Countdown, preceded by the contestants' profiles which were released from July 17 to 19 at 10 AM KST for each group. More teasers were released in July and August 2021 leading up to the show's premiere.

The show was available through Mnet in South Korea, iQIYI in China, AbemaTV and Mnet Japan in Japan, tvN Asia in Southeast Asia, and YouTube in the rest of the world through Mnet's YouTube channel, Mnet K-POP.

== Cast ==
The series was presented by Yeo Jin-goo, dubbed as the "Planet Master." The rest of the mentors, also dubbed as "masters," were:

- K-Pop Masters:
  - Lee Sun-mi
  - Tiffany Young
- Dance Masters:
  - Baek Koo-young
  - Jang Juhee
- Vocal Masters:
  - Lim Han-byul
  - Jo A-young
- Rap Master (Episodes 6–7):
  - Woo Won-jae

== Contestants ==
There was a total of 99 contestants participating in the competition. 33 were Korean, and 33 consisted of Chinese, Taiwanese and Hongkongers, and the last 33 were Japanese.

The English names of K-Group and C-Group contestants are presented in Eastern order in accordance with the official website while J-Group contestants' names are presented in Western order.

Color key (In order of contestant's group rank on the show)

Final members of Kep1er
Contestants eliminated in the final episode
Contestants eliminated in the third elimination round
Contestants eliminated in the second elimination round
Contestants eliminated in the first elimination round
Contestants that left the show

99 contestants
K-Group (South Korea)
Kim Chae-hyun (김채현)	Huening Bahiyyih (휴닝바히에)	Choi Yu-jin (최유진)	Kim Da-yeon (김다연)	Seo Young-eun (서영은)
Kang Ye-seo (강예서)	Kim Su-yeon (김수연)	Guinn Myah (귄마야)	Kim Bo-ra (김보라)	Kim Do-ah (김도아)
Yoon Ji-a (윤지아)	Jeong Ji-yoon (정지윤)	An Jeong-min (안정민)	Lee Hye-won (이혜원)	Kim Hye-rim (김혜림)
Huh Ji-won (허지원)	Choi Ye-young (최예영)	Lee Chae-yun (이채윤)	You Da-yeon (유다연)	Kim Se-in (김세인)
Sim Seung-eun (심승은)	Lee Yeon-gyung (이연경)	Lee Ra-yeon (이나연)	Lee Sun-woo (이선우)	Kim Ye-eun (김예은)
Lee Yun-ji (이윤지)	Choi Hye-rin (최혜린)	Ryu Si-on (류시온)	Suh Ji-min (서지민)	Joung Min (정민)
Kim Yu-bin (김유빈)	Cho Ha-eun (조하은)	Han Da-na (한다나)		
C-Group (China, Taiwan, Hong Kong)
Shen Xiaoting (沈小婷)	Fu Yaning (符雅凝)	Su Ruiqi (苏芮琪)	Wen Zhe (文哲)	Huang Xingqiao (黄星侨)
Chen Hsinwei (陳昕葳)	Zhou Xinyu (周心语)	Cai Bing (蔡冰)	Xu Ziyin (徐紫茵)	Liang Jiao (梁娇)
Li Yiman (李伊蔓)	Yang Zige (杨梓格)	Wang Yale (王雅乐)	Zhang Luofei (张洛菲)	Hsu Nientzu (許念慈)
Chiayi (家儀)	Wu Tammy (吴甜蜜)	Leung Cheukying (梁卓瀅)	Xia Yan (夏研)	Liang Qiao (梁乔)
Xu Ruowei (徐若惟)	Gu Yizhou (顾逸舟)	Chang Ching (張競)	Ma Yuling (马玉灵)	Lin Chenhan (林辰涵)
Cui Wenmeixiu (崔文美秀)	Chien Tzuling (簡紫翎)	Ho Szeching (何思澄)	Poon Wingchi (潘穎芝)	Lin Shuyun (林書蘊)
Liu Shiqi (刘诗琦)	Wang Qiuru (王秋茹)	Liu Yuhan (刘钰涵)		
J-Group (Japan)
Hikaru Ezaki (江崎ひかる)	Mashiro Sakamoto (坂本舞白)	Yurina Kawaguchi (川口ゆりな)	Shana Nonaka (野仲紗奈)	Ruan Ikema (池間琉杏)
Manami Nagai (永井愛実)	Ririka Kishida (岸田莉里花)	May (メイ)	Kotone Kamimoto (嘉味元琴音)	Reina Kubo (久保玲奈)
Miu Sakurai (櫻井美羽)	Ayana Kuwahara (桑原彩菜)	Moana Yamauchi (山内若杏名)	Shihona Sakamoto (坂本志穂菜)	Risako Arai (新井理沙子)
Moka Shima (島望叶)	Ayaka Fujimoto (藤本彩花)	Hana Hayase (早瀬華)	Miyu Ito (伊藤美優)	Fuko Hayashi (林楓子)
Nagomi Hiyajo (比屋定和)	Rinka Ando (安藤梨花)	Rinka Aratake (荒武凛香)	Momoko Okazaki (岡崎百々子)	Vivienne Inaba (稲葉ヴィヴィアン)
Yume Murakami (村上結愛)	Rei Kamikura (神藏令)	Hina Terasaki (寺崎日菜)	Sumomo Okuma (大熊李)	Fuka Oki (沖楓花)
Miyu Kanno (菅野美優)	Yuna Kitajima (北島由菜)	Kyara Nakamura (中村伽羅)		

== Ranking ==
=== Planet Top 9 ===
The Planet Top 9 was either selected by the mentors (Episode 2) or voted by viewers of the show; those selected to be the Planet Top 9 in Episode 2 were given the ability to reshuffle and organize cells.

Color key:

New Planet Top 9 (Note: Indicates contestants who had never placed in the Planet Top 9 in any prior elimination rounds or ranking announcements.)
Returned to Planet Top 9 (Note: Indicates contestants who had placed in the Planet Top 9 in a prior elimination round or ranking announcement, then had placed out of it, and then had come back)

#	Ep. 2	Ep. 5	Ep. 8	Ep. 9 (Note: As of September 27, 2021 at 10AM KST.)	Ep. 11	Special Live (Note: As of October 18, 2021 at 10AM KST.) (Note: On October 18, 2021, Mnet revealed the interim ranking of the contestants during <9IRLS NI9HT A9IT> Special Live)	Ep. 12
#	Contestant	Contestant	Contestant	Contestant	Contestant	Contestant	Contestant
P1	Hikaru Ezaki	Yurina Kawaguchi	Shen Xiaoting (▲1)	Shen Xiaoting	Shen Xiaoting	Kim Chaehyun (▲10)	Kim Chaehyun
P2	Kang Yeseo	Shen Xiaoting (▲1)	Yurina Kawaguchi (▼1)	Kim Dayeon (▲8)	Kim Dayeon	Choi Yujin (▲3)	Huening Bahiyyih (▲3)
P3	Shen Xiaoting	Hikaru Ezaki (▼2)	Mashiro Sakamoto (▲2)	Hikaru Ezaki (▲1)	Mashiro Sakamoto (▲1)	Kim Dayeon (▼1)	Choi Yujin (▼1)
P4	Su Ruiqi	Choi Yujin (▲3)	Hikaru Ezaki (▼1)	Mashiro Sakamoto (▼1)	Hikaru Ezaki (▼1)	Seo Youngeun (▲5)	Kim Dayeon (▼1)
P5	Jeong Jiyoon	Mashiro Sakamoto	Choi Yujin(▼1)	Yurina Kawaguchi (▼3)	Choi Yujin (▲1)	Huening Bahiyyih (▲8)	Seo Youngeun (▼1)
P6	Seo Youngeun	Su Ruiqi (▼2)	Su Ruiqi	Choi Yujin (▼1)	Yurina Kawaguchi (▼1)	Kang Yeseo (▲6)	Kang Yeseo
P7	Choi Yujin	Cai Bing (▲1)	Huang Xingqiao	Su Ruiqi (▼1)	Shana Nonaka (▲2)	Kim Suyeon (▲10)	Hikaru Ezaki (▲5)
P8	Cai Bing	Kang Yeseo (▼6)	Cai Bing (▼1)	Kim Chaehyun (▲1)	Fu Yaning (▲2)	Guinn Myah (▲17)	Mashiro Sakamoto (▲6)
P9	Ayana Kuwahara	Kim Chaehyun	Kim Chaehyun	Shana Nonaka (▲2)	Seo Youngeun (▲3)	Su Ruiqi (▲1)	Shen Xiaoting (▲7)

=== Planet Pass ===
Planet Pass was a vote by the mentors, in which eliminated contestants could be brought back to the show.

The first two elimination rounds included a Planet Pass for one eliminated contestant from each group. The third elimination round included only one Planet Pass which could go to any eliminated contestant regardless of group.

Ep. 5	Ep. 8	Ep. 11
Ruan Ikema	Kotone Kamimoto	Guinn Myah
Wen Zhe	Zhou Xinyu	Guinn Myah
Kim Hyerim	Kim Suyeon	Guinn Myah

=== First voting period ===
The first voting period took place from August 13, 2021, to August 28, 2021.

Voters (viewers and mentors) voted for three cells, as well as three girls of each group.

Eliminations were based on cell points, while the Planet Top 9 was based on individual points.

Color key:

Planet Top 9

Cell Rank
Rank	Episode 3 (Note: Cell points are as of August 20, 2021 at 10AM KST.)				Episode 5			
Rank	Cell Members			Points (Note: Cell Points are calculated through: [Number of Korean Votes × (Total Cell Votes ÷ Total Korean Cell Votes)] + [Number of International Votes × (Total Cell Votes ÷ Total International Cell Votes)].)	Cell Members			Points (Note: The Cell Points shown in Episode 5 are inclusive of those shown in Episode 3.)
Rank	K	C	J	Points	K	C	J	Points
1	Choi Yujin	Cai Bing	May	1,328,882	Choi Yujin	Cai Bing	May	2,929,629
2	Seo Youngeun	Shen Xiaoting	Yurina Kawaguchi	1,176,035	Seo Youngeun	Shen Xiaoting	Yurina Kawaguchi	2,649,735
3	Jeong Jiyoon	Su Ruiqi	Hikaru Ezaki	1,065,592	Jeong Jiyoon	Su Ruiqi	Hikaru Ezaki	2,048,599
4	Kang Yeseo	Huang Xingqiao	Mashiro Sakamoto	843,274	Kang Yeseo	Huang Xingqiao	Mashiro Sakamoto	1,912,854
5	Huening Bahiyyih	Hsu Nientzu	Shihona Sakamoto	534,755	Kim Chaehyun	Li Yiman	Ayana Kuwahara	1,153,957
6	Kim Doah	Xu Ziyin	Risako Arai	502,682	Kim Doah	Xu Ziyin	Risako Arai	1,134,128
7	Kim Chaehyun	Li Yiman	Ayana Kuwahara	351,067	Huening Bahiyyih	Hsu Nientzu	Shihona Sakamoto	1,025,869
8	Kim Suyeon	Fu Yaning	Shana Nonaka	286,390	Kim Suyeon	Fu Yaning	Shana Nonaka	640,747
9	Kim Dayeon	Wu Tammy	Miu Sakurai	223,105	Kim Dayeon	Wu Tammy	Miu Sakurai	589,272
10	Choi Yeyoung	Chen Hsinwei	Reina Kubo	209,637	Choi Yeyoung	Chen Hsinwei	Kubo Reina	490,970
11	Lee Chaeyun	Leung Cheukying	Ririka Kishida	183,342	Guinn Myah	Yang Zige	Kotone Kamimoto	485,596
12	An Jeongmin	Wang Yale	Ayaka Fujimoto	156,942	Huh Jiwon	Chiayi	Moana Yamauchi	467,491
13	Huh Jiwon	Chiayi	Moana Yamauchi	156,595	Lee Chaeyun	Leung Cheukying	Ririka Kishida	431,400
14	Lee Hyewon	Liang Jiao	Manami Nagai	148,979	Lee Hyewon	Liang Jiao	Manami Nagai	419,671
15	You Dayeon	Xu Ruowei	Rei Kamikura	122,428	An Jeongmin	Wang Yale	Ayaka Fujimoto	392,201
16	Guinn Myah	Yang Zige	Kotone Kamimoto	117,496	Kim Bora	Zhang Luofei	Hana Hayase	383,678
17	Kim Sein	Wen Zhe	Momoko Okazaki	110,687	Yoon Jia	Zhou Xinyu	Moka Shima	370,017
–	—N/a				Kim Hyerim	Wen Zhe	Ruan Ikema	Planet Pass

Results from 1st Global vote where viewers chose 3 contestants each vote. Benefits are included.

Episode 5 - Planet Top 9
#	Name	Points			Group
#	Name	Total	Korean	Global	Group
P1	Kawaguchi Yurina	4,446,387	342,119	1,816,746	J
P2	Shen Xiaoting	3,919,277	298,212	1,620,685	C
P3	Hikaru Ezaki	3,138,429	208,676	1,471,455	J
P4	Choi Yujin	3,119,661	218,207	1,400,513	K
P5	Sakamoto Mashiro	2,784,657	180,474	1,322,567	J
P6	Su Ruiqi	2,598,795	124,836	1,494,945	C
P7	Cai Bing	2,361,224	168,887	1,038,526	C
P8	Kang Yeseo	1,744,198	128,658	744,635	K
P9	Kim Chaehyun	1,704,528	142,258	632,422	K

=== Second voting period ===
The second voting period took place from September 3, 2021, to September 18, 2021.

Voters voted for three contestants of each group.

Eliminations were based on individual points within K-Group, C-Group and J-Group.

Color key:

Planet Top 9
Left the show

Surviving Contestants (by group)
Rank	Episode 8					
Rank	K		C		J	
Rank	Name	Points	Name	Points	Name	Points
1	Choi Yujin (–)	3,173,040	Shen Xiaoting (–)	5,517,873	Yurina Kawaguchi (–)	4,661,720
2	Kim Chaehyun (↑1)	2,665,915	Su Ruiqi (–)	2,912,831	Mashiro Sakamoto (↑1)	4,578,784
3	Kim Dayeon (↑4)	2,614,923	Huang Xingqiao (↑1)	2,816,654	Hikaru Ezaki (↓1)	4,176,316
4	Kang Yeseo (↓2)	2,475,538	Cai Bing (↓1)	2,682,114	Shana Nonaka (↑2)	2,563,703
5	Seo Youngeun (↓1)	2,015,176	Wen Zhe (↑6)	2,197,276	Manami Nagai (↑2)	2,363,513
6	Guinn Myah (↑3)	1,803,320	Chen Hsinwei (↓1)	1,751,753	Ririka Kishida (↓1)	2,221,061
7	Kim Bora (↑5)	1,662,629	Fu Yaning (–)	1,658,939	Ruan Ikema (↑7)	1,729,825
8	Huening Bahiyyih (↓2)	1,503,092	Xu Ziyin (↓2)	1,637,433	May (↓4)	1,696,554
–	Kim Suyeon	Planet Pass	Zhou Xinyu	Planet Pass	Kotone Kamimoto	Planet Pass

Planet Rank (Surviving Contestants)
Episode 8
#	Name	Points	#	Name	Points	#	Name	Points
P1	Shen Xiaoting	5,517,873	P10	Kim Dayeon	2,614,923	P19	Ruan Ikema	1,729,825
P2	Yurina Kawaguchi	4,661,720	P11	Shana Nonaka	2,563,703	P20	May	1,696,554
P3	Mashiro Sakamoto	4,578,784	P12	Kang Yeseo	2,475,538	P21	Kim Bora	1,662,629
P4	Hikaru Ezaki	4,176,316	P13	Manami Nagai	2,363,513	P22	Fu Yaning	1,658,939
P5	Choi Yujin	3,173,040	P14	Ririka Kishida	2,221,061	P23	Xu Ziyin	1,637,433
P6	Su Ruiqi	2,912,831	P15	Wen Zhe	2,197,276	P24	Huening Bahiyyih	1,503,092
P7	Huang Xingqiao	2,816,654	P16	Seo Youngeun	2,015,176	–	Kotone Kamimoto	Planet Pass
P8	Cai Bing	2,682,114	P17	Guinn Myah	1,803,320	–	Zhou Xinyu	Planet Pass
P9	Kim Chaehyun	2,665,915	P18	Chen Hsinwei	1,751,753	–	Kim Suyeon	Planet Pass

=== Third voting period ===
The third voting period took place from September 24, 2021, to October 9, 2021. Voters could only vote for one contestant from each group.

Eliminations were based on individual votes regardless of group.

Planet Rank (Surviving Contestants)
Episode 9				Episode 11					
#	Name	#	Name	#	Name	Points	#	Name	Points
P1	Shen Xiaoting (–)	P10	Fu Yaning (↑12)	P1	Shen Xiaoting (–)	4,161,699	P10	Su Ruiqi (↓3)	1,369,169
P2	Kim Dayeon (↑8)	P11	Kang Yeseo (↑1)	P2	Kim Dayeon (–)	2,395,726	P11	Kim Chaehyun (↓3)	1,308,669
P3	Hikaru Ezaki (↑1)	P12	Seo Youngeun (↑4)	P3	Mashiro Sakamoto (↑1)	2,314,788	P12	Kang Yeseo (↓1)	1,248,877
P4	Mashiro Sakamoto (↓1)	P13	Huening Bahiyyih (↑11)	P4	Hikaru Ezaki (↓1)	2,185,083	P13	Huening Bahiyyih (–)	1,238,862
P5	Yurina Kawaguchi (↓3)	P14	Wen Zhe (↑1)	P5	Choi Yujin (↑1)	1,747,716	P14	Wen Zhe (–)	1,121,791
P6	Choi Yujin (↓1)	P15	Huang Xingqiao (↓8)	P6	Yurina Kawaguchi (↓1)	1,692,862	P15	Kim Bora (↑6)	1,023,271
P7	Su Ruiqi (↓1)	P16	Ruan Ikema (↑3)	P7	Shana Nonaka (↑2)	1,621,602	P16	Huang Xingqiao (↓1)	1,015,623
P8	Kim Chaehyun (↑1)	P17	Manami Nagai (↓4)	P8	Fu Yaning (↑2)	1,548,272	P17	Kim Suyeon (↑3)	989,381
P9	Shana Nonaka (↑2)	P18	Chen Hsinwei (–)	P9	Seo Youngeun (↑3)	1,524,572	–	Guinn Myah	Planet Pass

=== Fourth voting period ===
The first round of the fourth voting period took from October 15, 2021, until 10AM KST on October 22, 2021.

The second round was open during the finale live broadcast on October 22, 2021; all live votes were doubled.

Voters could only vote for one contestant out of the eighteen remaining.

The members of the debut lineup were decided based on individual votes regardless of group.

Planet Rank
<9IRLS NI9HT A9IT> Special Live				Episode 12					
#	Name	#	Name	#	Name	Points	#	Name	Points
P1	Kim Chaehyun (↑10)	P10	Fu Yaning (↓2)	P1	Kim Chaehyun (–)	1,081,182	P10	Kim Suyeon (↓3)	650,790
P2	Choi Yujin (↑3)	P11	Kim Bora (↑4)	P2	Huening Bahiyyih (↑3)	923,567	P11	Guinn Myah (↓3)	625,722
P3	Kim Dayeon (↓1)	P12	Hikaru Ezaki (↓8)	P3	Choi Yujin (↓1)	915,722	P12	Fu Yaning (↓2)	560,606
P4	Seo Youngeun (↑5)	P13	Yurina Kawaguchi (↓7)	P4	Kim Dayeon (↓1)	885,286	P13	Su Ruiqi (↓4)	552,878
P5	Huening Bahiyyih (↑8)	P14	Mashiro Sakamoto (↓11)	P5	Seo Youngeun (↓1)	781,657	P14	Yurina Kawaguchi (↓1)	525,051
P6	Kang Yeseo (↑6)	P15	Shana Nonaka (↓8)	P6	Kang Yeseo (–)	770,561	P15	Kim Bora (↓4)	503,773
P7	Kim Suyeon (↑10)	P16	Shen Xiaoting (↓15)	P7	Hikaru Ezaki (↑5)	713,322	P16	Shana Nonaka (↓1)	342,370
P8	Guinn Myah (↑17)	P17	Wen Zhe (↓3)	P8	Mashiro Sakamoto (↑6)	708,149	P17	Wen Zhe (–)	88,673
P9	Su Ruiqi (↑1)	P18	Huang Xingqiao (↓2)	P9	Shen Xiaoting (↑7)	700,663	P18	Huang Xingqiao (–)	56,600

=== Result ===
The finale was held and broadcast live on October 22, 2021. Yeo Jin-goo announced the newly formed girl group name to be Kep1er (케플러).

Episode 12
#	Name	Points	Company
P1	Kim Chaehyun	1,081,182	Wake One Entertainment
P2	Huening Bahiyyih	923,567	IST Entertainment
P3	Choi Yujin	915,722	Cube Entertainment
P4	Kim Dayeon	885,286	Jellyfish Entertainment
P5	Seo Youngeun	781,657	Biscuit Entertainment
P6	Kang Yeseo	770,561	143 Entertainment
P7	Hikaru Ezaki	713,322	Avex Artist Academy
P8	Mashiro Sakamoto	708,149	143 Entertainment
P9	Shen Xiaoting	700,663	Top Class Entertainment

== Episodes ==
No.	Title	Original release date
1	"Contact (너와 내 꿈들이 연결될 시간 (Note: RR: Neowa Nae Kkumdeuri Yeongeldoel Shigan English: Time For You and My Dreams To Connect))"	August 6, 2021
The episode opens with all 99 girls being divided into cells, each consisting of a Korean, Chinese, and Japanese contestant. Groupings are based on a variety of characteristics common to the girls, such as type of career and personal interests. The competition's host Yeo Jin-goo and mentors are introduced. Yeo then explains the rules of the competition, revealing that a cell of girls can all be eliminated at once; he also explains that if a girl lands a spot in the "Planet Top 9", they will be given the option to rearrange cells. Each girl is evaluated to determine whether they should be considered to become a Planet Top 9 candidate and their initial ranking is revealed prior to each performance based on the theme song evaluation test.
2	"Contact (너의 세계가 궁금해 (Note: RR: Neoui Segyega Gunggeumhae English: I'm Curious About Your World))"	August 13, 2021
Evaluations continue, and the Planet Top 9 for the episode are announced; the top three contestants consisted of Hikaru Ezaki (J-Group), Kang Yeseo (K-Group) and Shen Xiaoting (C-Group). The cells are then either rearranged or kept. The next day, the girls participate in a mission where they have to connect with their childhood photos. The fastest teams are given priority to form teams for the first mission, dubbed as the "Connect Mission". There are two categories in the Connect Mission round. The main category consisted of four girl group songs (Blackpink - How You Like That, Iz*One - Fiesta, Twice - Yes or Yes, Oh My Girl - The Fifth Season (SSFWL)). The four winning teams will have their vote count doubled 24 hours before voting concludes. The second category is known as EBS (Exo - The Eve, BTS - Mic Drop, and Seventeen - Pretty U). Only one team can win in this category but their vote count will be tripled 24 hours before voting concludes. Each team consisted of three cells each, with nine members per team and eleven teams overall. The best out of the five winning performances will perform on M Countdown after the mission.
3	"Connect (너도 내 우주에 끌리고 있잖아 (Note: RR: Neodo Nae Ujue Kkeulligo Issjanha English: You Too Are Attracted to My Universe))"	August 20, 2021
Current cell rankings are displayed at the beginning of the episode. Contestants begin preparing for their first mission by determining their positions in the performance. Several days before the team performances, a dance battle is held to determine the order in which the teams will perform. Following the dance competition, the teams continue to practice, with the mentors offering feedback on how to improve. The group performances then begin. "Yes or Yes" Team 1 wins, followed by "How You Like That" Team 1. The episode ends with the "Eve" team about to perform.
4	"Connect (더 확실하게 My Sign (Note: RR: Deo Hwagsilhage My Sign English: More Definitely My Sign))"	August 27, 2021
The group performances continue. "Fiesta" Team 1 wins, followed by "The Fifth Season" Team 1. The boy group song performances are then shown, with the "Pretty U" team securing the most points out of the three and winning. After the completion of the performances, the winning team that will get to perform on M Countdown is revealed to be "Yes or Yes" Team 1. During the end credits, it is revealed that only 54 contestants will survive in the following episode, meaning that 45 contestants will be eliminated.
5	"It's Me! (바로 나야! (Note: RR: Baro Naya!))"	September 3, 2021
The first ranking announcement begins. The top 16 cells are first announced, with the cell of Choi Yujin, Cai Bing and May securing first place with 2,929,629 points. For the last surviving cell, the cell of Yoon Jia, Zhou Xinyu and Moka Shima remains in the competition as the surviving cell. Then, the results of the Planet Pass is announced; the Planet Pass is a vote between the mentors in which eliminated contestants would be given a chance to continue in the competition. K-Group's Kim Hyerim, C-Group's Wen Zhe and J-Group's Ruan Ikema are announced to be receiving the Planet Pass, allowing them to remain in the competition. Following this, the new Planet Top 9 are then announced, with J-Group's Yurina Kawaguchi obtaining first place with 4,446,387 points. During the preview of the next episode, it is revealed that the next round dubbed as the "Combination Mission" will begin in the following episode.
6	"Combination (더 확실하게 My Sign)"	September 10, 2021
Host Yeo Jin-goo explains to the girls that the next mission would be the Combination Mission, revealing that the cell system would be phased out leading to all rankings being individual. He then explains the Combination Mission, stating that the 54 girls will be split into either 3-member, 6-member or 9-member teams for the mission. There are a total of six songs for 3-member teams, three songs for 6-member teams and two songs for 9-member teams. The girls form their teams, with priority given to the first round's top placing cell. While preparing, the girls are evaluated by the mentors through an interim check. The performances begin, with the "We Are" team performing first. The episode ends with the "Fate" team about to perform. Four songs created for the next mission dubbed as the "Creation Mission" are also revealed. Viewers ae told to vote who they wanted to perform which song through the Universe app.
7	"같은 꿈을 꾸는 너와 나 (Note: RR: Gateun Kkumeul Kkuneun Neowa Na English: You And I Dream The Same Dream)"	September 17, 2021
The Combination Mission performances continue. The winners of the Combination Mission are then announced. For the 3-person teams, the "In the Morning" team wins, securing 90,000 points each. For the 6-person teams, the "Fate" team wins, securing 45,000 points each. For the 9-person teams, the "Salute" team wins, securing 30,000 points each. During the previews for the next episode, the girls are introduced to the Creation Mission songs which were previously shown to the audience in the previous episode. It is also reiterated that 27 girls will be eliminated next episode, along with the continued implementation of the Planet Pass.
8	"생존자 발표식 (Note: RR: Saengjonja Balpyosig English: Survivor Announcement Ceremony) (손을 잡아줘 (Note: RR: Soneul Jabajwo English: Hold My Hand))"	September 24, 2021
The 54 girls split into four different groups for the four Creation Mission songs, having been arranged through viewer's votes. The girls begin trying to arrange themselves in their assigned songs. In the midst of rehearsals, the second elimination round results are announced to the girls. The top seven contestants in each group are revealed, followed by the eighth-ranking contestant of each group. Following this, the new Planet Top 9 is announced. C-Group's Shen Xiaoting achieves first place with 5,517,873 points. Shortly after, the Planet Pass recipients are announced. They are announced to be K-Group's Kim Suyeon, C-Group's Zhou Xinyu, and J-Group's Kotone Kamimoto. At the end of the episode, it is also revealed that Xu Ziyin, who placed 8th in C-Group, has left the show due to health issues.
9	"Creation #1 (신곡) (I'm gonna be your star) (Note: RR: Creation #1 (Singog) (I'm gonna be your star) English: Creation #1 (New Song) (I'm gonna be your star))"	October 1, 2021
The Creation Mission continues with the 26 girls rearranging parts and changing lineups for their Creation Mission songs. Due to the eliminations, some teams has excess or are short of a few members. Only the "Shoot!" team does not require any changes. During the preparation period, the four teams embark on a special mission entitled the Planet Teamwork Mission. In the Planet Teamwork Mission, all teams must perform their Creation Mission songs no matter where they go using teamwork. The four teams have to pick any of the four waiting buses which will ferry them to their destination. The "Shoot!" team goes to meets the mother of K-Group's Kim Dayeon. The "Snake" team visits a rural town, harvesting sweet potatoes and chili peppers. The "U+Me=LOVE" team goes to Lotte World Tower and receives a massage and a dinner at a luxurious restaurant. The "Utopia" team hikes to a paragliding ground and paraglides with the assistance of instructors. Each team performs their song at the location they visited. Afterwards, the teams continue to prepare for the Creation Mission. They are interrupted when the second interim results are announced to the girls. The top 18 contestants are announced in ascending order, followed by the current Planet Top 9. The top three are announced to be C-Group's Shen Xiaoting, K-Group's Kim Dayeon and J-Group's Hikaru Ezaki. They also place first in their respective groups. After the second interim results, footage from a month earlier shows the 54 girls from the Combination Mission embarking on a field day. The girls from each group form a team and compete in a series of games. The winning team receives fleece jackets while the runner-up team receives cosmetics sets. The J-Group won with a total of 720 points, followed by the C-Group with 450 points and the K-Group with 300 points. The episode ends with the K-Group receiving towels as a prize for finishing 3rd.
10	"한 걸음 한 걸음 좀 더 가까이 (Note: RR: Han Geoleum Han Geoleum Jom Deo Gakkai English: Step By Step A Little Closer)"	October 8, 2021
The episode begins with the girls attending a fan meeting with some viewers of the show. They perform several of their past performances from the Planet Demo Stage and the previous two missions. After the fan meeting, the girls give presents to the audience. The episode then begins with the commencement of the Creation Mission performances. The "Shoot!" team performs first, followed by the "Utopia" team. The "U+Me=LOVE" team then performs, followed by the "Snake" team. After the performances, the winner is announced to be the "U+Me=LOVE" team, scoring 94.17 out of 100 points. Then, it is revealed that another mission named the O.O.O Mission will take place during the next episode. Further details are revealed; the girls will be first organized into 3 different groups that will perform a debut group version of the show's theme song, "O.O.O (Over&Over&Over)". The teams were voted for by the viewers through Universe.
11	"생존자 발표식 (응답해줘 오버 (Note: RR: Eungdabhaejwo Obeo English: Answer Me Over))"	October 15, 2021
The episode begins with the O.O.O Mission. The girls are grouped into three different teams; two containing nine members and the third containing eight. In between performances, the girls are shown video messages and performances by viewers of the show from around the world. The winners of the O.O.O Mission were determined by the viewers of the show; the contestant of each team that accumulated the most number of YouTube likes on their respective video within 24 hours would obtain a benefit of 90,000 (nine-member) or 80,000 points (eight-member). The winners of the O.O.O mission are announced to be Choi Yujin (Team 1) and Huening Bahiyyih (Team 2), each obtaining the 90,000 points, as well as Seo Youngeun (Team 3) who obtains 80,000 points. The episode then proceeds to the third ranking elimination. C-Group's Shen Xiaoting maintains her first place ranking with 4,161,699 points. After the seventeen survivors are announced, the Planet Pass recipient is then revealed to be K-Group's Guinn Myah. The episode ends with the preview of the final episode's mission called the Completion Mission.
12	"파이널 생방송 (Note: RR: Paineol Saengbangsong English: Final Live Broadcast) (손을 잡아줘)"	October 22, 2021
The 18 finalists perform the show's theme song. Host Yeo Jin-goo then announces the opening of the final voting round where all live votes are doubled. The finalists' audition and highlight videos are then shown. Yeo explains the live voting process, stating that the final count is a sum of the votes from the first week and the votes during the live finale. He then interacts with members from a live Zoom audience as well as the mentors and some eliminated contestants that constitute the live audience. The current 9th place candidates are announced, revealed to be C-Group's Shen Xiaoting and J-Group's Hikaru Ezaki. The episode cuts to the day where the finalists are introduced to the Completion Mission song "Shine". The finalists form two teams of nine that will perform the song together during the finale. Yeo then reveals the debuting girl group's name to be Kep1er, followed by a performance of "Shine" by the finalists. The episode then cuts to a week prior where the finalists watch videos recorded by themselves and fellow contestants after the first mission. The finalists then perform "Another Dream", a pop ballad song. The episode again cuts to a night where the finalists are treated to a party, reviewing self-created artworks, receiving a lavish dinner, viewing polaroids that serve as memories and watching videos recorded by some of their parents. Yeo begins to announce the debut lineup of Kep1er. J-Group's Mashiro Sakamoto and Hikaru Ezaki place 8th and 7th respectively. K-Group's Kang Yeseo, Seo Youngeun, Kim Dayeon, Choi Yujin, Huening Bahiyyih and Kim Chaehyun place subsequently in ascending order. The 9th place candidates are revealed to be C-Group's Shen Xiaoting, as well as K-Group's Kim Suyeon and Guinn Myah. The 9th ranker is announced to be C-Group's Shen Xiaoting. The episode comes to a close with the debuting and eliminated girls coming together, congratulating each other and exchanging hugs.

== Discography ==
=== Extended plays ===
Title	Details	Peak chart positions
Title	Details	JPN Hot
Girls Planet 999 – Creation Mission	Released: October 8, 2021; Label: Stone Music Entertainment; Formats: Digital download, streaming; Track list: 1. U+Me=LOVE; 2. Snake (뱀); 3. Shoot!; 4. Utopia	11
Girls Planet 999 – Completion Mission	Released: October 22, 2021; Label: Stone Music Entertainment; Formats: Digital download, streaming; Track list: 1. Shine; 2. Another Dream	—
"—" denotes releases that did not chart or were not released in that territory.

=== Singles ===
Title	Year	Peak chart positions	Album
Title	Year	KOR DL	Album
"O.O.O (Over&Over&Over)"	2021	—	Non-album single
"U+Me=LOVE"	2021	125	Girls Planet 999 – Creation Mission
"Snake" (뱀)	2021	145	Girls Planet 999 – Creation Mission
"Shoot! "	2021	139	Girls Planet 999 – Creation Mission
"Utopia"	2021	121	Girls Planet 999 – Creation Mission
"Shine"	2021	157	Girls Planet 999 – Completion Mission
"Another Dream"	2021	—	Girls Planet 999 – Completion Mission
"—" denotes releases that did not chart or were not released in that territory.

== Ratings ==
Average TV viewership ratings
Ep.	Original broadcast date	Average audience share
Ep.	Original broadcast date	Nationwide
1	August 6, 2021	0.461% (77th)
2	August 13, 2021	0.760% (43rd)
3	August 20, 2021	0.708% (47th)
4	August 27, 2021	0.711% (47th)
5	September 3, 2021	0.858% (31st)
6	September 10, 2021	0.787% (39th)
7	September 17, 2021	0.838% (42nd)
8	September 24, 2021	0.793% (38th)
9	October 1, 2021	0.710% (41st)
10	October 8, 2021	0.592% (55th)
11	October 15, 2021	0.634% (49th)
12	October 22, 2021	0.889% (34th)
Average		0.728%
In the table below, blue numbers represent the lowest ratings and red numbers represent the highest ratings.; This show aired on a cable channel/pay TV which normally has a relatively smaller audience compared to free-to-air TV/public broadcasters (KBS, SBS, MBC and EBS).

== Post-Competition ==
Kep1er was supposed to debut on December 14, 2021, with the mini album First Impact, but due to one of their staff members testing positive for COVID-19, their debut was delayed to January 3, 2022. The group's debut performance at the 2021 Mnet Asian Music Awards on December 11 was also cancelled as a result, as well as some members testing positive for COVID-19. The group officially debuted on January 3, 2022. Since then, they have released two studio albums (one in Korean and one in Japanese), five EPs and three Japanese singles. In May 2024, it was revealed that all members, except for Kang Ye-seo (P06) and Sakamoto Mashiro (P08), renewed their contracts with WakeOne.

- Ye-seo (P06) and Mashiro (P08) left the group on July 15, 2024, after the group's concerts in Yokohama, Japan. They returned to their label 143 Entertainment and debuted in girl group Madein on September 3, 2024, with their first mini album, Rise.
- Seo Young-eun (P05) left the group on March 6, 2026 after an eight-month hiatus. She was initially absent from the group's comeback in August 2025.
Other contestants
- Some contestants returned to their original groups:
  - Ma Yuling (C24) and Wang Qiuru (C32) returned to SNH48.
  - Liang Jiao (C10) and Liang Qiao (C20) returned to GNZ48.
  - Su Ruiqi (P13) returned to Chic Chili.
  - Wen Zhe (P17) returned to Hickey.
  - Sim Seungeun (K21) returned to Bvndit and joined group promotions for their third mini album, Re-Original, in May 2022. Bvndit disbanded on November 11, 2022, after all the members terminated all their contracts with MNH.
  - Lee Rayeon (K23), Chiayi (C16) and Kim Doah (K10) returned to Fanatics. The group disbanded sometimes in 2024.
  - Huh Jiwon (K16), May (P23) and Kim Bora (P15) returned to Cherry Bullet and rejoined group promotions for their second mini album, Cherry Wish, in March 2022. Cherry Bullet disbanded on April 22, 2024, after several members, including Jiwon and May, terminated their exclusive contracts.
- Some trainees left their agencies/joined new agencies:
  - Chang Ching (C23) and Lee Yunji (K26) left Yuehua Entertainment and Cube Entertainment respectively. Later, they signed with FC ENM, the same agency of contestants Ririka Kishida (P22) and Hana Hayase (J18).
  - Ruan Ikema (P19) and Hina Terasaki (J28) signed with KISS Entertainment.
  - Jeong Jiyoon (K12) signed with KM Entertainment.
  - You Dayeon (K19) left Highline Entertainment.
  - Han Dana (K33) signed a contract with Beats Entertainment.
  - Miyu Ito (J19) signed a contract with 143 Entertainment, the company that manages Kep1er members Kang Yeseo (P6) and Mashiro Sakamoto (P8).
  - Li Yiman (C11) signed a contract with FLEX M.
  - Shihona Sakamoto (J14) left Jellyfish Entertainment.
  - Kim Yeeun (K25) left Fantagio Music.
  - Choi Hyerin (K27) left MNH Entertainment.
  - Chien Tzuling (C27) left Yuehua Entertainment.
  - Kim Hyerim (K15) signed with Doubling Music.
  - Xia Yan (C19) joined Real Show Culture Company.
  - Lee Yeongyung (K22) joined Come & Funny Corporation.
  - Risako Arai (J15) and Yume Murakami (J24) left Biscuit Entertainment. Then, Risako signed with iME Korea
  - Kotone Kamimoto (P24) joined Modhaus.
  - An Jeongmin (K13) left TOP Media.
  - Sim Seungeun left MNH Entertainment.
  - Hsu Nientzu (C15) left FNC Entertainment and joined Modhaus.
  - SNH48's Wang Qiuru (C32) graduated on April 4, 2023.
  - Zhou Xinyu (P22) left Yuehua Entertainment and joined Modhaus.
  - Joung Min (K30) left Blockberry Creative.
  - Choi Yeyoung (K17) and Ryu Sion (K28) left Blockberry Creative & joined Sure Space.
- Some contestants debuted in new groups or debuted as soloists:
  - Kim Suyeon (P10) debuted as a new member of Mystic Story's girl group, Billlie, under the stage name "Sheon". She debuted on November 27, 2021. She had her first release with the group on December 14 with their first digital single album The Collective Soul and Unconscious: Snowy Night.
  - Su Ruiqi (P13) released her 8th digital single on December 14, 2021.
  - Fu Yaning (P12) released her second digital single titled Starlight on December 27, 2021. She also starred in the iQiYi dramas My Heart and The Flowers Are Blooming.
  - Ririka Kishida (P22), Hana Hayase (J18), Chang Ching (C23) and Lee Yunji (K26) debuted under FC Entertainment in a six-member group called ILY:1 on April 4, 2022. Lee Yunji and Chang Ching use the stage name "Ara" and "Rona" respectively while Ririka Kishida and Hana Hayase use their birth names.
  - Shana Nonaka (P16) debuted in MLD Entertainment's new girl group, Lapillus, with the single "Hit Ya!" on June 20, 2022.
  - Kim Hyerim (K15) debuted as a soloist on January 24, 2022.
  - Yurina Kawaguchi (P14) debuted as a soloist on March 21, 2022, with her first single Look At Me.
  - Kim Bora (P15) starred in the web-drama Jinx.
  - Huh Jiwon (K16) starred in the web-drama Heart Way.
  - Wen Zhe (P17) debuted as an actress.
  - Yoon Jia (K11) debuted in Yes Im Entertainment group MiMiiRose on September 16, 2022.
  - Miyu Ito (J19) debuted in 143 Entertainment's group LimeLight on February 14, 2023.
  - Jeong Jiyoon (K12) joined Ichillin' and made her debut with the group on November 10, 2022.
  - Ruan Ikema (P19) and Manami Nagai (P20) will debut in Kiss Entertainment's Japan-based girl group Kiss Girl's.
  - Kotone Kamimoto (P24), Hsu Nientzu (C15), and Zhou Xinyu (P22) were revealed as TripleS' eleventh, thirteenth, and fifteenth member on January 2, March 20, and July 2, 2023, respectively.
  - Momoko Okazaki (J21) joined Babymetal.
  - Kim Doah (K10) debuted as a soloist on May 23, 2023, with the digital single "Dream Walking".
  - An Jeongmin (K13) debuted as a soloist on June 24, 2023, with the digital single "Rainy Day", under the stage name JEOMi.
  - You Dayeon (K19) debuted as a soloist on October 20, 2023, with the digital single "Down Down Down".
  - Choi Yeyoung (K17) and Ryu Sion (K28) debuted in 5-member girl group Geenius, under Sure Space, on January 5, 2024.
  - Guinn Myah (P11) debuted in TOP Media's new girl group Odd Youth on November 1, 2024.
  - Risako Arai (J15) debuted in SW Entertainment's girl group UDTT, with the pre-debut single "Retry" on December 11, 2024. The group will officially debut on April 29, 2025.
  - Nakamura Kyara (J33) debuted in Japan's based group BENNY, under TryCrew Entertainment, with the single "Woah", on February 21, 2025.
- Some contestants participated in other survival shows:
  - Moana Yamauchi (J13) participated in the Japanese survival show iCON Z.
  - Zhou Xinyu, Cui Wenmeixiu, Gu Yizhou, and Cai Bing participated in the Chinese survival show, "Great Dance Crew".
  - Lee Sunwoo (K24) participated in Channel A's "Youth Star".
  - You Dayeon (K19) participated in Show Me the Money 11, but was eliminated in the first round.
  - Sakurai Miu (J11), Fujimoto Ayaka (J17), and Kanno Miyu (J31) participated in Produce 101 Japan The Girls. Miu placed 4th in the finale and will debut as a member of ME:I.
  - Lee Sunwoo (K24) and Choi Hyerin (K27) participated in Universe Ticket.
  - Kim Bora and Huh Jiwon participated in Queendom Puzzle.
  - Ikema Ruan (J05), Aratake Rinka (J23), and Kamikura Rei (J27) participated in Chuang Asia: Thailand. Ruan placed 2nd in the finale and will debut as a member of Gen1es.
  - Hayashi Fuko (J20) participated in Mnet's I-Land 2: N/a in 2024.
  - Moana Yamauchi (J13) participated in KBS's "The Entertainer".
  - Fujimoto Ayaka (J17) and Oki Fuka (J30) participated in the Japanese audition show Black & White. Ayaka withdrew prior to the show's premiere due to visa procedures in South Korea, while Fuka ranked 8th and will debut in the "White" themed group MilMoon under VOLVE CREATIVE.
  - Kuwahara Ayana (J12) and Aratake Rinka (J23) participated in Abema's World Scout: The Final Piece.
