= Kim Do-ah =

South Korean singer and actress (born 2003)

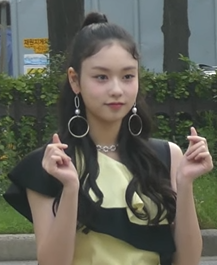
- Kim in 2019
- Born: December 4, 2003 (age 22); Seoul, South Korea
- Occupations: Singer; rapper; actress
- Musical career
- Genre: K-pop
- Instrument: Vocals
- Years active: 2018–present
- Labels: FENT; Fascino
- Formerly of: Fanatics; Fanatics-Flavor

Korean name
- Hangul: 김도아
- Hanja: 金鍍我
- RR: Gim Doa
- MR: Kim Toa

Kim Do-ah (Korean: 김도아, born December 4, 2003), also known by the mononym Doah, is a South Korean singer, rapper, and actress. She was a member of South Korean girl group, Fanatics and its sub-unit, Fanatics-Flavor until their disbandment in 2024. She is known for her participation in Produce 48 and Girls Planet 999.

== Career ==
=== 2018–2022: Produce 48, debut with Fanatics and solo activities ===
In 2018, Kim participated in Mnet's reality girl group survival show Produce 48 as a trainee of FENT. She eventually placed 23rd and was eliminated in the third round. On November 5, FENT announced that Kim would debuted as a member of Fanatics first sub unit Fanatics-Flavor. The unit officially debuted on November 26 with the single album Milkshake.

In 2019, Kim made her acting debut in Naver TV's web series I Am Not a Robot where she portrayed the role of Han Yeo-reum, described as a bold and overly honest girl. On August 6, 2019, she made her official debut as a member of Fanatics with the release of their debut EP The Six.

On March 10, 2020, Kim took a role of Im Seon-ji, described as an innocent girl who had unexpected charm, in Naver TV's web series The World of My 17. She also played the role of Go Yeon-yi, the male lead's new love interest, in the third and fourth season of the web series Real:Time:Love.

On July 18, 2021, Kim was officially announced as a contestant in another Mnet's reality girl group survival show Girls Planet 999. She was eliminated in episode 8 and finished 10th in K-Group.

In November 2022, Kim took a role on EBS1's Secret of Lightning Cape as Han Woo-re. The role was described as a sister who was trying to reveal the secret of a mysterious lightning cape that turned his brother, a ten-years-old boy into a hero after getting it, while also protecting him.

=== 2023–present: Solo debut and group disbandment ===
On May 23, 2023, Kim officially debuted as a solo artist with the release of the digital single "Dream Walking". She performed the single for the first time on SBS M's The Show.

On October 17, 2024, Fanatics disbanded as well as its subunit Fanatics-Flavor.

== Endorsements ==
In 2019, Kim was appointed as a model for cosmetics brand Etude. She was deemed a perfect fit for the brand which earned her the nickname "Etude Human" (인간 에뛰드).

== Discography ==
=== Singles ===
List of singles, with selected chart positions, showing year released and album name
Title	Year	Peak chart position	Album
Title	Year	KOR	Album
"Dream Walking" (꿈의 태엽)	2023	—	Non-album single
"—" denotes releases that did not chart or were not released in that region.

=== Soundtrack appearances ===
List of soundtrack appearances, showing year released and album name
Title	Year	Album
"Like You" (니가 좋아져)	2020	The World of My 17 OST
"It's Okay, It's You" (괜찮아 너니까)	2020	Real:Time:Love 3 OST

== Filmography ==
=== Film ===
Year	Title	Role	Ref.
2022–2023	Mismatch	So Bo-ra	

=== Television series ===
Year	Title	Role	Notes	Ref.
2022–2023	Secret of Lightning Cape	Han Woo-re		
2023	The Story of Park's Marriage Contract	Princess	Extra; episode 1, 9	

=== Web series ===
Year	Title	Role	Notes	Ref.
2019	I Am Not A Robot	Han Yeo-reum		
2020	The World of My 17	Im Seon-ji	Season 1	
2020	Real:Time:Love	Go Yeon-yi	Season 3–4	
2023	My Man Is Cupid	Yoo Jeong-ah		
2025	Demon's Profile Picture	Min-hee		
2026	My Little Chef	Mi-ri		

=== Television shows ===
Year	Title	Role	Notes	Ref.
2018	Produce 48	Contestant	Finished in 23rd place in third elimination round	
2021	Girls Planet 999	Contestant	Eliminated in second elimination round	
