= Fanatics (group) =

South Korean girl group

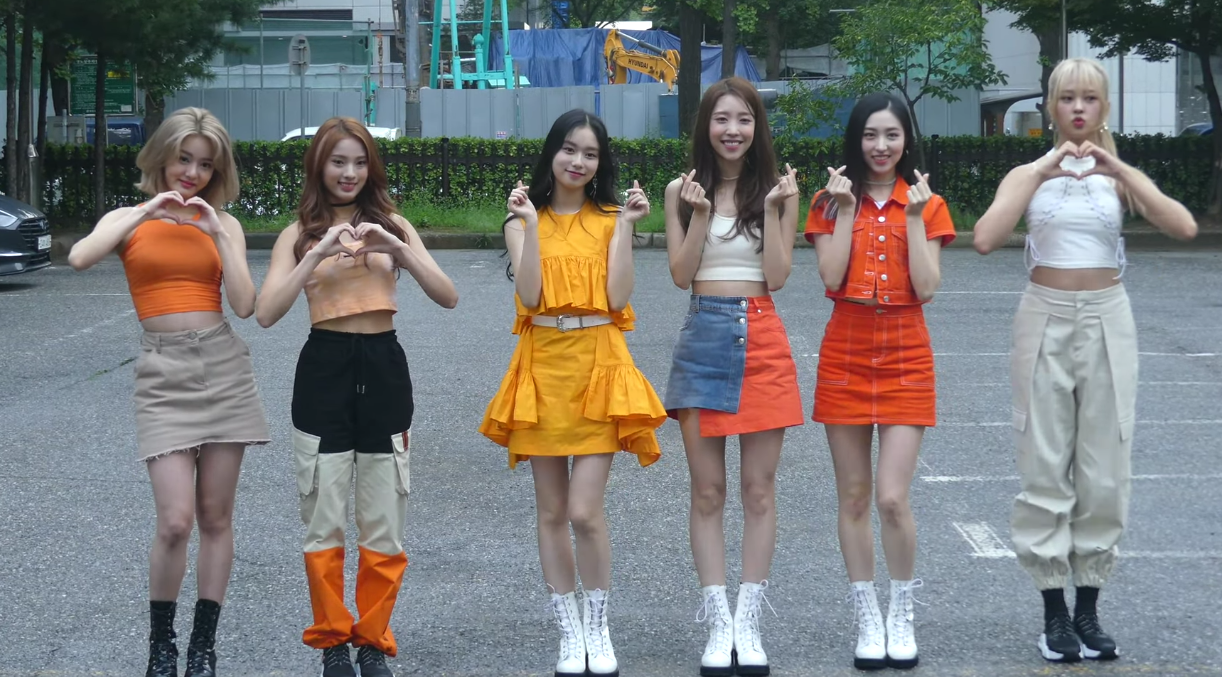
- Fanatics in August 2019 (From left to right: Chaelin, Chiayi, Doah, Doi, Sika, Yoonhye)

Background information
- Origin: Seoul, South Korea
- Genres: K-pop
- Years active: 2019–2024
- Labels: FENT
- Past members: Sika; Chaelin; Rayeon; Via; Yoonhye; Doi; Chiayi; Doah

Fanatics (Korean: 파나틱스; stylized in all caps) was an eight-member South Korean girl group formed by FENT in 2018.

== History ==
=== Pre-debut ===
Chaelin was a contestant of Produce 101 Season 1 as a trainee of Midas Entertainment, where she finished in 87th place. Doah was a contestant on Produce 48, where she finished in 23rd place.

=== 2018: Sub-unit Flavor ===
Before the full group debut, they debuted a three-member sub-unit called Fanatics–Flavor (파나틱스-플레이버), consisting of Chiayi, Yoonhye and Doah. The sub-unit debuted on November 26, 2018 with their first single album "Milkshake".

=== 2019: Full group debut with The Six ===
On July 19, 2019, FENT announced the full group's debut with their logo motion and on August 6, 2019, the group made their debut with the release of their debut EP The Six, with the title track "Sunday".

=== 2020: 2 new members and Plus Two ===
On April 12, 2020, the group announced their first comeback and on May 4, 2020, the group made their comeback with their second EP Plus Two, with the title track "Vavi Girl". The comeback involved 2 new members, Via and Rayeon, while members Chaelin and Yoonhye were not involved.

=== 2021–2024: Starry Night, Girls Planet 999 participation, Doah solo debut, line-up changes, and disbandment ===
On May 10, 2021, the group came back with their first digital single "Starry Night". Chiayi, Chaelin, Rayeon, and Doah participated in this comeback while Via, Sika, Yoonhye, and Doi were not involved.

Later that year, Chiayi, Rayeon and Doah took part in the Mnet survival show Girls Planet 999, which aired from August 6 to October 22, 2021. Rayeon was eliminated in episode 5, finishing in 23rd place in K-Group. This was later followed by Doah and Chiayi in episode 8, who finished in 10th place in K-Group and 16th place in C-Group, respectively.

On September 24, 2021, Sika announced her departure from the group.

In 2022, Chaelin left FENT and Fanatics, in 2024 she made her solo debut independently with the song, "Let It Snow."

On November 24, 2022, Chiayi and Doi were interviewed by Oninews - X Super Idol in Taiwan, where the girls revealed that FANATICS hasn't disbanded and that all members are preparing for a comeback as soon as they wrap their current individual activities.

Member Doah made her solo debut with the single "Dream Walking" on May 23, 2023. Rayeon left the company and the group, and became a model under Leaders Entertainment with her real name, Nayeon.

In 2024, Via confirmed through a comment on social media that she left the company and the group. As well as Yoonhye who left the group and company to focus on her modeling career.

On October 17, 2024, It was announced through a post on Instagram that Fanatics had officially disbanded, as well as its sub-unit Fanatics-Flavor.

== Members ==
- Doi (도이)
- Chiayi (지아이)
- Doah (도아)
- Sika (시카)
- Chaelin (채린)
- Rayeon (나연)
- Via (비아)
- Yoonhye (윤혜)

=== Sub-units ===
- Flavor (Korean: 플레이버) – Chiayi, Yoonhye, and Doah

== Discography ==
=== Extended plays ===
Title	Details	Peak chart positions	Sales
Title	Details	KOR	Sales
Fanatics
The Six	Released: August 6, 2019; Label: FENT, Kakao M; Formats: CD, digital download; Track listing: 1. Sunday; 2. Remember (지금 이 순간을); 3. Follow Me; 4. Milkshake (Chinese Ver.)	27	KOR: 2,026
Plus Two	Released: May 4, 2020; Label: FENT, Kakao M; Formats: CD, digital download; Track listing: 1. Intro (Be My Fanatic); 2. Vavi Girl; 3. No.1; 4. All You Are (Feat. John East); 5. If You & I (우유 한 잔); 6. Outro (Let Me Fly); 7. If You & I (우유 한 잔) (Acoustic Ver.)	36	KOR: 1,405

=== Single albums ===
Title	Album details	Peak chart positions	Sales
Title	Album details	KOR	Sales
Fanatics - Flavor
Milkshake	Released: November 26, 2018; Label: FENT, Kakao M; Formats: CD, digital download; Track listing: 1. Milkshake; 2. Milkshake (Chinese Ver.)	43	KOR: 1,020

=== Singles ===
Title	Year	Peak chart positions	Album
Title	Year	KOR	Album
Fanatics - Flavor
"Milkshake"	2018	—	Milkshake
Fanatics
"Sunday"	2019	—	The Six
"Vavi Girl"	2020	—	Plus Two
"Starry Night"	2021	—	Non-album single
"—" denotes releases that did not chart or were not released in that region.

== Videography ==
Title	Year	Director
"Milkshake" (Fanatics - Flavor)	2018	Hong Won-Ki (Zanybros)
"Sunday"	2019	Unknown
"V.A.V.I. Girl"	2020	Unknown
