= First Impact =

- Digital cover

EP by Kep1er
- Released: January 3, 2022
- Length: 19:06
- Language: Korean
- Label: WakeOne; Swing

Kep1er chronology
First Impact (2022)	Doublast (2022)

Singles from First Impact
- 1. "Wa Da Da" Released: January 3, 2022

First Impact is the debut extended play (EP) by South Korean girl group Kep1er, a project group formed through the 2021 Mnet reality competition show Girls Planet 999. The album was released on January 3, 2022, by WakeOne. It is available in three versions: "Connect 0", "Connect -" and "Connect 1", and contains six tracks with "Wa Da Da" as its lead single.

== Background and release ==
Kep1er was formed through the Mnet reality survival show Girls Planet 999, which aired from August 6 to October 22, 2021. The show brought 99 contestants from China, Japan and South Korea to compete to debut in a multinational girl group. Out of initially 99 contestants, only the top nine would be in the final debut lineup.

Kep1er was originally scheduled to debut on December 14, 2021, with their first EP First Impact, with pre-orders beginning on November 29. However, it was announced that the group's scheduled debut had been delayed to January 3, 2022, due to one of their staff members having tested positive for COVID-19. On December 14, it was revealed that group members Mashiro and Xiaoting tested positive for COVID-19. On December 26, Kep1er's agency announced that Xiaoting and Mashiro have fully recovered from COVID-19.

On January 3, 2022, Kep1er released their debut EP First Impact with "Wa Da Da" serving as the lead single.

== Critical reception ==
Professional ratings
Review scores
Source	Rating
NME	3/5 stars

Gladys Yeo from NME gave the extended play three out of five stars, calling the EP an energetic six-track project record that makes for an enjoyable listen but falls short in fleshing out Kep1er's identity as an act. She commented how individually, the songs on the EP can be enjoyable and how this allows the group members to show off their vocal abilities, but falters when it comes to cohesion and establishing the group's identity.

== Track listing ==
First Impact track listing
No.	Title	Lyrics	Music	Arrangement	Length
1.	"See the Light"	Park Woo-sang	Park Woo-sang; Lee Sang-won	Park Woo-sang; Lee Sang-won	1:51
2.	"Wa Da Da"	BuildingOwner (PrismFilter); Elum (PrismFilter); Shannon; Danke; Hwang Yu-bin; Odal Park; Lee Seu-ran; Kako	BuildingOwner (PrismFilter); Elum (PrismFilter); Shannon	BuildingOwner (PrismFilter)	3:03
3.	"MVSK"	Jeong Ho-hyeon (E.one)	Jeong Ho-hyeon (E.one)	Jeong Ho-hyeon (E.one)	3:10
4.	"Shine" (Kep1er ver.)	Isran; Inner Child (MonoTree); Seo Ha-young (MonoTree); Albi Albertsson (Mussashi); Mia Kemppainen	Albi Albertsson (Mussashi); Mia Kemppainen; Kanata Okajima; Hautboi Rich; Inner Child (MonoTree); Seo Ha-young (MonoTree); Ryan Kim; Peter Chun; Sabrina Salmon	Albi Albertsson (Mussashi)	3:34
5.	"Another Dream" (Kep1er ver.)	Park Soo-seok; Seo Ji-eun; Wang Yu-rim	Park Soo-seok; Seo Ji-eun	Park Soo-seok; Seo Ji-eun	3:21
6.	"O.O.O (Over&Over&Over)" (Kep1er ver.)	Jeong Ho-hyeon (E.one); Hwang Hyun-hyeon (MonoTree); Girls Planet 999	Jeong Ho-hyeon (E.one); Hwang Hyun-hyeon (MonoTree)	Jeong Ho-hyeon (E.one); Hwang Hyun-hyeon (MonoTree)	4:07
Total length:					19:06

== Charts ==
=== Weekly charts ===
Weekly chart performance for First Impact
Chart (2022)	Peak position
Finnish Albums (Suomen virallinen lista)	19
Japanese Albums (Oricon)	2
Japanese Hot Albums (Billboard Japan)	10
South Korean Albums (Gaon)	1

=== Monthly charts ===
Monthly chart performance for First Impact
Chart (2022)	Peak position
Japanese Albums (Oricon)	8
South Korean Albums (Gaon)	3

=== Year-end charts ===
Year-end chart performance for First Impact
Chart (2022)	Position
Japanese Albums (Oricon)	83
Japanese Download Albums (Billboard Japan)	96
South Korea Albums (Circle)	42

== Certifications ==
Certifications and sales for First Impact
Region	Certification	Certified units/sales
South Korea (KMCA)	Platinum	250,000^{^}
^{^} Shipments figures based on certification alone.

== Release history ==
Release history for First Impact
Region	Date	Format	Label
South Korea	January 3, 2022	CD; digital download; streaming	WakeOne; Swing
Various	January 3, 2022	Digital download; streaming	WakeOne; Swing
