= Kiiras =

South Korean girl group

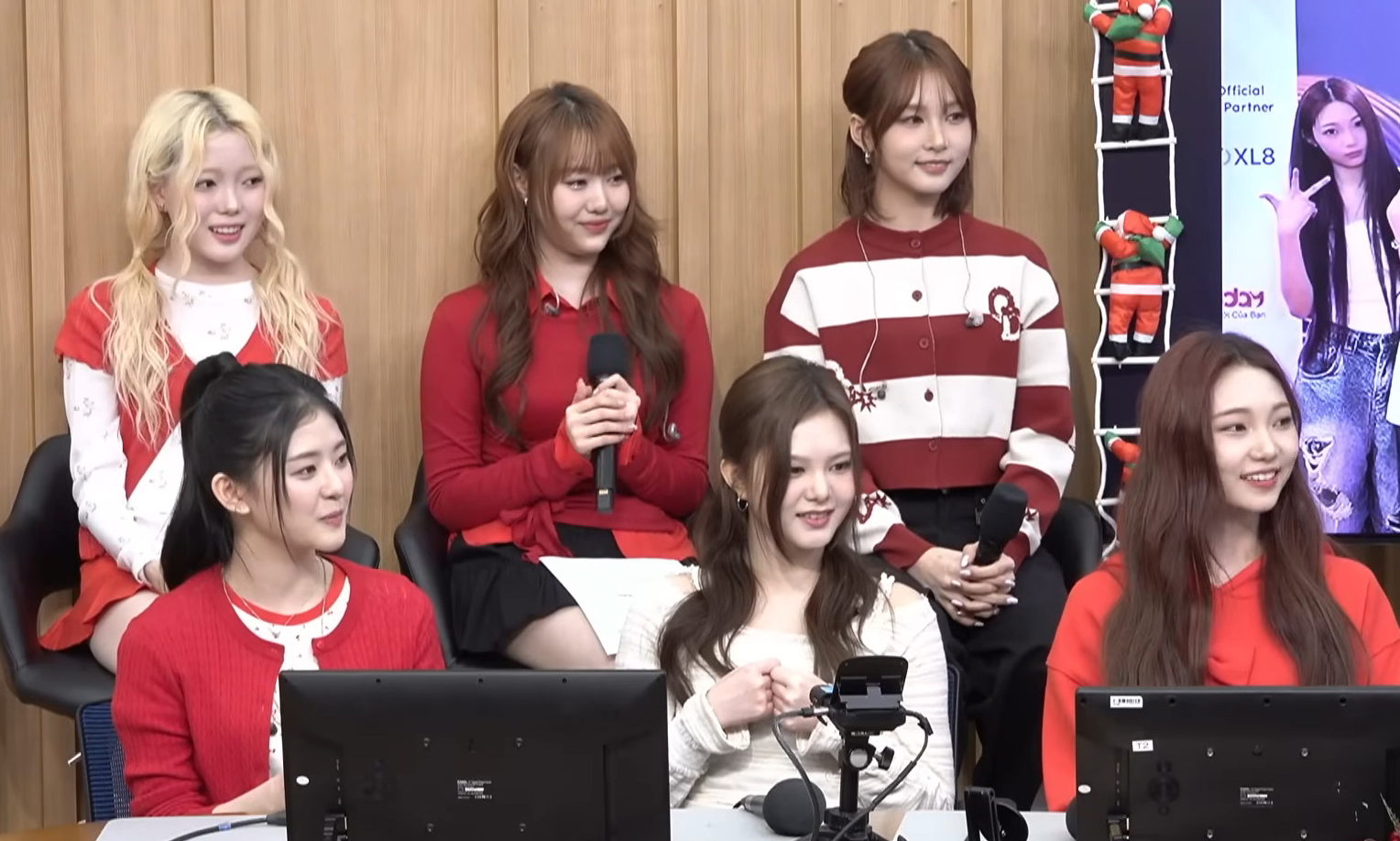
- Kiiras in 2025; Top row, L-R: Doyeon, Kurumi, and Kylie; Bottom row: Harin, Lingling, and Roah

Background information
- Origin: Seoul, South Korea
- Genre: K-pop
- Years active: 2025–present
- Label: LeanBranding
- Members: Lingling; Kurumi; Harin; Kylie; Doyeon; Roah

Kiiras (Korean: 키라스; RR: Kiraseu) is a South Korean girl group formed by LeanBranding. The group consists of six members: Lingling, Harin, Kylie, Kurumi, Doyeon, and Roah. The group made their debut on May 29, 2025.

== Name ==
The name "Kiiras" is a combination of the Korean word "Ki", meaning energy, and the English word "rascal".

== Career ==
=== Pre-debut and introduction ===
Kiiras, set to be the first global girl group of LeanBranding, is produced by R&B singer-songwriter and producer Saay, who began her music career in 2012 as a member of the girl group EvoL. Following the group's disbandment in 2015, she signed with Universal Music and launched her solo career with the debut single "Circle" in 2017, and by the time nearing Kiiras's debut, Saay had expanded her career as a K-pop producer.

The first member to be revealed was Lingling, a 19-year-old Malaysian who formerly trained under both YG Entertainment and WakeOne. During her period as a trainee under WakeOne, Lingling was a contestant of K-pop survival show I-Land 2 in 2024. However, Lingling was eliminated in the seventh episode of the show and did not make it into the final lineup of Izna, WakeOne's first non-temporary girl group. Sometime after her appearance in I-Land 2, Lingling signed under LeanBranding as a trainee, and on April 18, 2025, Lingling was announced as the first member of Kiiras, and is set to be the first Malaysian female K-pop artist. On May 6, 2025, Lingling was selected as the leader of Kiiras.

Between late April 2025 and early May 2025, the remaining five members of Kiiras (four Koreans and one Japanese) were announced to the public. Out of these five, three of the members, Kylie (16 years old), Harin (17 years old), and Kurumi (18 years old), were revealed by May 2, 2025. Harin, who was a top student in her middle school, was selected as a trainee after undergoing a nationwide audition conducted by LeanBranding. The last two members, Doyeon and Roah, were announced on May 5, 2025. 15-year-old Doyeon was a former child actress who appeared in several television dramas and advertisements prior to becoming a K-pop trainee. As for 13-year-old Roah, she first began her career as a gugak (traditional Korean music) artist and also appeared in ads, movies and drama series before she transitioned as a trainee. Right before her debut as an idol, Roah participated in the Gugak Hanmadang, an open Korean traditional music festival, becoming the first idol to take part in this event.

=== 2025–present: Debut with Kill Ma Bo$$ ===
Kiiras debuted on May 29, 2025, with the release of the digital single "Kill Ma Bo$$". In promotion of their debut, the group performed the single on music shows including Mnet's M Countdown, KBS2's Music Bank, MBC's Show! Music Core, and SBS's Inkigayo. Their debut EP of the same name was released on June 9, and their debut showcase was conducted at the Ilchi Art Hall on the same day. On November 14, they released their first physical single "Bang Bang!". A Christmas special single, "Kiirasmas", will be released on December 8.

== Artistry ==
Kiiras's debut concept incorporated the features of American country music genres, and the debut single "Kill Ma Bo$$" also explored the combination of R&B and hip-hop. Upon the release of "Kill Ma Bo$$", early reviews of the track was mostly positive towards the concept.

== Members ==
- Lingling (링링) – leader
- Kurumi (쿠루미)
- Harin (하린)
- Kylie (카일리)
- Doyeon (도연)
- Roah (로아)

== Discography ==
=== Extended plays ===
List of EPs, with selected details, chart positions and sales
| Title | Details | Peak chart positions | Sales |
| Title | Details | KOR | Sales |
|---|---|---|---|
| Kill Ma Bo$$ | Released: June 9, 2025; Label: LeanBranding; Formats: CD, digital download, streaming | 41 | KOR: 5,171 |

=== Single albums ===
List of single albums, with selected details, chart positions and sales
| Title | Details | Peak chart positions | Sales |
| Title | Details | KOR | Sales |
|---|---|---|---|
| Bang Bang! | Released: November 14, 2025; Label: LeanBranding; Formats: CD, digital download, streaming | 22 | KOR: 3,498 |
| Ta Ta | Released: May 6, 2026; Label: LeanBranding; Formats: Digital download, streaming | 20 | KOR: 10,000 |

=== Singles ===
List of singles, showing year released, selected chart positions, and name of the album
| Title | Year | Peak chart positions | Album |
| Title | Year | KOR DL | Album |
|---|---|---|---|
| "Kill Ma Bo$$" | 2025 | 140 | Kill Ma Bo$$ |
| "Bang Bang!" | 2025 | 199 | Bang Bang! |
| "Kiirasmas" | 2025 | — | Non-album single |
| "Ta Ta" | 2026 | 104 | Ta Ta |
"—" denotes releases that did not chart or were not released in that region.
