= Keyveatz =

South Korean girl group

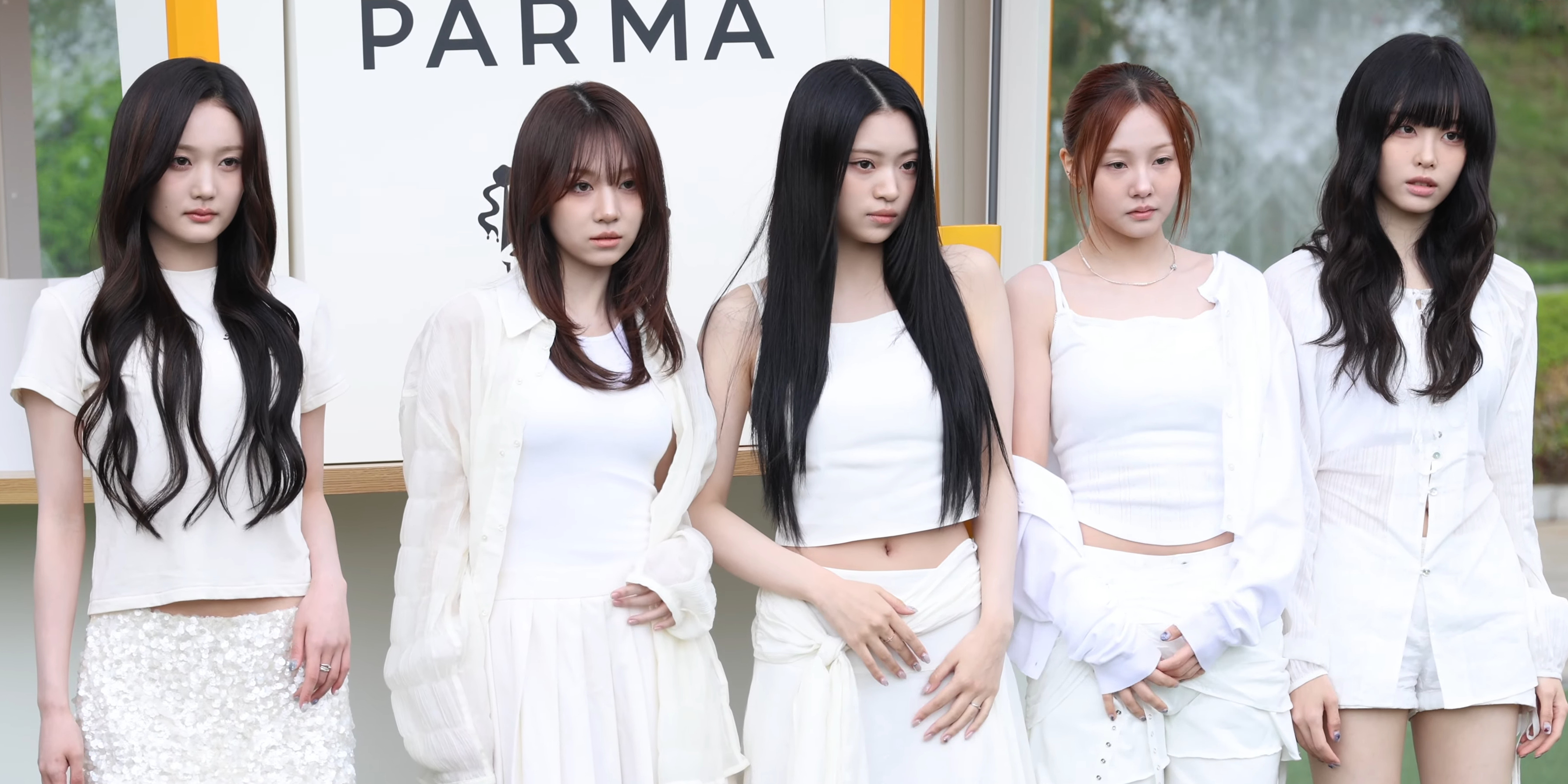
- Keyveatz in 2026; L–R: Newy, Um Jione, Kang Yeseul, Son Juone, and Kim Yuna

Background information
- Also known as: AOMG Girls
- Origin: Seoul, South Korea
- Genres: Hip-hop; K-pop
- Years active: 2026–present
- Label: AOMG
- Members: Son Juone; Kang Yeseul; Newy; Kim Yuna; Um Jione

Keyveatz (Korean: 키비츠) is a girl group formed in 2026 by AOMG. The group consists of five members: Son Ju-won, Kang Ye-seul, Newy, Kim Yu-na, and Um Ji-won. Formed from participants eliminated from I-Land 2: N/a and from a 2025 audition, they released their pre-debut double single "Key Beats" on April 29. They debuted on June 30, 2026 with the release of Oxy_gen.

== Name ==
AOMG stated that the name "Keyveatz" embodies a sense of direction and a desire to serve as the key that establishes new trends, as well as an ambition to read the scene and make bold, decisive moves, a concept derived from "kibitz." The name reflects the group's resolve to cultivate an unpredictable individuality and style rooted in breakdancing culture and underground hip-hop.

== History ==
=== Formation and pre-debut ===
Prior to the group's formation, three of its members participated in the survival reality competition series I-Land 2: N/a, which created the girl group Izna. Son Juwon, Yui, and Um Jiwon joined AOMG following their eliminations from the show. In April 2026, AOMG announced that their first girl group had entered its debut phase, revealing the name Keyveatz and opening an official SNS account that featured the three in a 2025 AOMG audition casting film. Days later, the label revealed the five members: Yui (as Newy), Um Jiwon (as Um Jione), Kang Yeseul, Son Juwon (as Son Juone), and Kim Yuna.

The group is positioned as part of AOMG's rebranding project "Make It New," with Bandwagon Asia characterizing the group's "'Messy Girls' ethos" as leaning into "raw, unpolished energy" that prioritizes "attitude and individuality over traditional concepts." They released their pre-debut double single "Key Beats" on April 29, which included the song "Catch My Breath". They later confirmed their appearances at KCON Japan in May. In May 2026, they posted the first episode of their documentary Keyveatz Archive on their YouTube channel, documenting the audition process and their formation.

=== 2026–present: Debut with Oxy_gen ===
In June 2026, it was announced that the group had completed their pre-debut activities and would debut that month on June 30 with the extended play (EP) Oxy_gen, featuring five songs. The group unveiled their initial concept photos by June 11 in conjunction with their debut teaser launch, followed by a video featuring entertainer Kian84 on June 16. They debuted on June 30, 2026 with the release of Oxy_gen and its title track, "Oxy", which The Korea Times described as "staking a claim in one of K-pop's last open spaces — girlish hip-hop."

== Members ==
- Son Juone (손주원)
- Kang Yeseul (강예슬)
- Newy (유이)
- Kim Yuna (김유나)
- Um Jione (엄지원)

== Discography ==
=== Extended plays ===
List of extended plays, showing selected details, selected chart positions, and sales figures
Title	Details	Peak chart positions	Sales
Title	Details	KOR	Sales
Oxy_gen	Released: June 30, 2026; Labels: AOMG; Formats: CD, digital download, streaming	27	KOR: 7,473

=== Singles ===
List of singles, showing year released, and album name
Title	Year	Album
"Oxy"	2026	Oxy_gen
