= I-Land 2: N/a =

2024 South Korean reality competition series

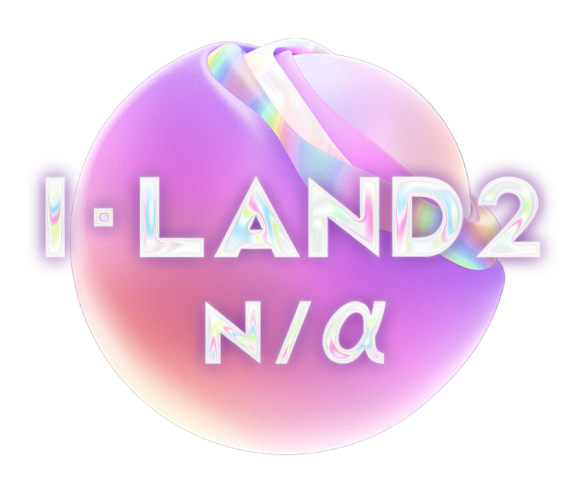
- Also known as: I-Land 2
- Hangul: 아이랜드 2
- RR: Airaendeu 2
- MR: Airaendŭ 2
- Genre: Reality competition
- Presented by: Song Kang; Sung Han-bin; Jeon Somi
- Opening theme: "Final Love Song" by Rosé
- Country of origin: South Korea
- Original language: Korean
- No. of seasons: 2
- No. of episodes: 11

Production
- Executive producer: Teddy Park
- Running time: 90 minutes
- Production companies: Studio Take One (Note: A subsidiary of CJ ENM); Mnet

Original release
- Network: Mnet
- Release: April 18 – July 4, 2024

Related
- I-Land

I-Land2: N/a (Korean: 아이랜드 2; stylized in all caps) is a 2024 South Korean survival reality competition series created by Mnet in collaboration with WakeOne and The Black Label. It is a sequel to I-Land, which created Enhypen, following the process of creating a new girl group. It premiered on Mnet on April 18, 2024, and was separated into two parts. The episodes of Part 1 aired every Thursday at 20:50 (KST) and the episodes of Part 2 aired every Thursday at 21:30 (KST). The show ended with the formation of a seven-member girl group named Izna, which would be trained and managed under WakeOne and become their first non-temporary girl group with a standard contract.

== Concept ==
In a setup similar to last season, the show is split into two Parts. In Part 1, twenty-four contestants are brought to a complex in the middle of a lush green forest. They will stay in either "I-Land" or "Ground". I-Land is a modern three-floor building with living spaces, a gym, dance studios, an item room for storage, a make-up room, and individual practice rooms. However, only 12 contestants can stay there. The remaining contestants will be sent to a simpler building called "Ground," which only has a dance studio, locker room, and dining area. They will have to commute to and from "I-Land" every day at fixed times. I-Land, and the stage where contestants' skills will be evaluated, known as the I-Stage, are connected by a gate, known as the Meta Ball. Ground is a short walk from those two connected buildings.

In Part 2, the remaining 12 contestants all get to stay in I-Land and the Ground building no longer gets used. The section of the building where I-Stage used to be became a pickup/drop-off spot for the contestants to get to and from their new performance stage, the CJ ENM Ilsan Studio.

Part 1's concept revolves around the contestants' and producers' votes and evaluation, which play a crucial role in deciding who stays in I-Land, who goes to the Ground, and who gets eliminated. In Part 2, the concept shifts to the I-Mates' and producers' votes and evaluation, which play a crucial role in deciding the contestants rankings, and again, who gets eliminated. Because I-Land can only accommodate 12 trainees, in Part 1, the contestants may be dropped and demoted to the Ground and promptly replaced by trainees from the Ground.

This season, a fox-like AI creature named NAsuri will accompany the trainees and serve as the show's mascot. For this season, the audience will be known as I-Mates. The title of this season's signal song is "Final Love Song", which is a rendition of "The Final Countdown" by Europe.

== Background and promotion ==
On July 9, 2023, Mnet officially confirmed they plan to air I-Land 2 in the first half of 2024. Additionally, they announced the opening of global auditions for girls born before January 1, 2011, and a global audition tour was held in 10 countries and 13 cities.

A second season of I-Land was promoted since 2020 as a collaboration with Belift Lab and Hybe. This initial plan eventually fell through, and Belift Lab instead produced R U Next?.

- On September 18, 2020, during the finale of the first season of I-Land, at the very end during the credits, it was revealed that auditions would begin shortly in preparation for debuting a girl group. An online audition called 'WWW Untact Audition' was held in December 2020.
- On September 27, 2021, Mnet, Belift Lab and HYBE revealed the first teaser video announcing a new season to be called 'I-Land 2' and a global online audition was to be held in seven locations: Korea, Japan, Vietnam, Australia, Thailand, Taiwan, and the United States. The applicant submissions began on September 27 and ended on October 10. Any female born before December 31, 2009, regardless of nationality or place of residence, were eligible to apply and over 141,227 applications were received. For those who passed the first round, a real-time video call audition was held from October 24 to November 21 and the final candidates were selected through another audition.
- On July 15, 2022, Mnet said that they had decided to temporarily postpone the airing of the show which was scheduled to air in 2022.

On July 24, 2023, Mnet announced that they would collaborate with producer Teddy Park and his label, The Black Label. On November 28, on the first day of the 2023 MAMA Awards, Mnet revealed that I-LAND 2 will premiere in April 2024. On February 5, 2024, it was revealed through the media that I-LAND 2 had attracted around 20,000 applicants from a global audition tour that ended in October 2023. On March 11, it was announced that the show will premiere on April 18, while the show's producers and performance directors were revealed to be BIGBANG's Taeyang, dancers Monika and Lee Jung, and producers 24 and VVN a week later.

== Cast ==
- Storytellers: Song Kang (Part 1), Sung Han-bin (Part 2), & Jeon Somi (Episode 11)
- Executive producer: Teddy Park
- Main producer: Taeyang
- Music producers: 24 and VVN
- Performance directors: Leejung Lee and Monika
- Special Mentor: Jeon Somi (Ep. 4)
- Special Directors: Kim Jae Hwan (Ep. 4-5 & 9) and Lip J (Ep. 4-5)
- Special Trainer: Jang Eunsil (Ep. 9)

== Episodes ==
- Episode 1 (April 18, 2024)
- Episode 2 (April 25, 2024)
- Episode 3 (May 2, 2024)
- Episode 4 (May 9, 2024)
- Episode 5 (May 16, 2024)
- Episode 6 (May 23, 2024)
- Special (May 30, 2024)
- Episode 7 (June 6, 2024)
- Episode 8 (June 13, 2024)
- Episode 9 (June 20, 2024)
- Episode 10 (June 27, 2024)
- Episode 11 (final; July 4, 2024)

== Contestants ==
Color key:

Final members of Izna
Eliminated in the final episode
Eliminated in Part 2
Eliminated in the final episode of Part 1
Eliminated in Part 1
I-Land (Part 1); Top 6 (Part 2)
Ground (Part 1); Bottom 5 (Part 2)
Moved out of I-Land to Ground (Part 1); Unknowingly part of the debut lineup, 7th place (Part 2)

Name	Ranking														
Name	Part 1								Part 2						
Name	Initial Rank	Entrance Test	Signal Song Test	Seesaw Game	Unit Battle	Producer Rank #1	1:1 Position Battle	1st Save Vote	Producer Rank #2	Black Made Test	Main Position Test	Self Made Test	2nd Save Vote	Final Save Vote	Final Rank
Choi Jungeun (최정은) (Note: Choi Jungeun & Nam Yuju are former contestants on Cap-Teen.)	1	1	1	5	8	3	Part 2		4	8	10	2		1	1
Bang Jeemin (방지민) (Note: Bang Jeemin is a former contestant on R U Next?.) (Note: Bang Jeemin & Kang Jiwon are former Belift Lab trainees.) (Note: Bang Jeemin & Um Jiwon are former Source Music trainees.)	4	2	4	17	10	1	Moved Out	1	7	1	2	1		2	2
Yoon Jiyoon (윤지윤) (Note: Yoon Jiyoon is a former The Black Label trainee.)	11	10	13	21	1	11	Part 2		8	4	3	3		3	3
Koko (코코) (Note: Full Name: Koko Narai (奈良井胡々)) (Note: Koko & Yui are former Avex Entertainment trainees.)	5	8	6	3	6	7	Moved Out	2	6	2	1	5	4	4	4
Ryu Sarang (유사랑)	3	5	9	15	9	6	Part 2		2	7	6	7	7	5	5
Mai (마이) (Note: Full Name: Mai Tomioka (富岡茉衣))	9	4	2	2	2	4	Part 2		5	11	9	9	8	7	6
Jeong Saebi (정세비)	8	6	5	1	5	5	Part 2		1	3	7	8	5	6	7
Fuko (후코) (Note: Full Name: Fuko Hayashi (林楓子)) (Note: Fuko is a former contestant on Girls Planet 999.)	2	3	15	4	3	2	Part 2		3	5	4	4	6	8	8
Nam Yuju (남유주) (Note: Nam Yuju is a former contestant on Stars Awakening.) (Note: She is also a former member of predebut group Evermore Muse under Evermore Entertainment.) (Note: Full Name: Nam Yuju/Yumiko Tachikawa (남유주/達川由美子))	14	Ground	10	18	12	8	Moved Out	3	10	10	8	10	9	9	9
Kim Gyuri (김규리) (Note: Kim Gyuri is a former child actress, appeared in many drama such as My Mister, Hotel del Luna, Pegasus Market & Do Do Sol Sol La La Sol.)	16	11	14	16	17	Ground	Ground	6	12	6	5	6	10	10	10
Kim Sujung (김수정) (Note: Kim Sujung is a former contestant on Street Dance Girls Fighter 2.)	13	9	3	14	11	9	Moved Out	4	9	9	12	11	11	Eliminated	11
Son Juwon (손주원)	6	12	8	6	18	Ground	Ground	5	11	12	11	12	12	Eliminated	12
Yui (유이) (Note: Full Name: Yui Hamaue (浜上由衣))	10	7	7	13	4	10	Moved Out	7	Eliminated						13
Park Yeeun (박예은) (Note: Park Yeeun appeared on a Short / TikTok that garnered 2 million views.)	19	Ground	Ground	9	16	Ground	Ground	8	Eliminated						14
Kim Minsol (김민솔) (Note: Kim Minsol is a former contestant on My Teenage Girl.) (Note: She is also a former Jellyfish Entertainment, PocketDol Studio & Interpark Music Plus trainee.)	12	Moved Out	12	22	13	Ground	Ground	9	Eliminated						15
Lingling (링링) (Note: Lingling is a former YG Entertainment trainee.) (Note: Full Name: Alicia Wong Ling Ling (黄羚棱).)	15	Ground	Ground	11	7	12	Moved Out	10	Eliminated						16
Um Jiwon (엄지원)	7	Ground	Ground	8	19	Ground	Ground	11	Eliminated						17
Choi Soul (최소울)	20	Moved Out	11	7	15	Ground	Ground	12	Eliminated						18
Kim Chaeeun (김채은) (Note: Kim Chaeeun is a Professional Ballet Dancer, she trained at the Royal Ballet School.)	24	Ground	Ground	20	20	Ground	Ground	13	Eliminated						19
Oh Yuna (오유나) (Note: Oh Yuna gone viral with a dance cover on SNS.)	22	Ground	Ground	19	14	Ground	Ground	14	Eliminated						20
Nana (나나) (Note: Full Name: Nana Tabata (田端那菜)) (Note: Nana is a former contestant on Produce 101 Japan The Girls.)	18	Ground	Ground	10	21	Eliminated									21
Kang Jiwon (강지원) (Note: Kang Jiwon was a trainee under CJ Entertainment in 2021.)	23	Ground	Ground	12	22	Eliminated									22
Yuiko (유이코) (Note: Full Name: Yuiko Hirata (平田結子))	17	Moved Out	Ground	23	Eliminated										23
Kim Eunchae (김은채)	21	Moved Out	Ground	24	Eliminated										24

== Missions ==
=== Part 1 ===
==== Entrance Test ====
The contestants are to perform a song in groups of three to five contestants. However, unlike the first season, the producers and directors will vote for those deemed worthy to go to I-Land instead of having the contestants who aren't performing participate in a vote for each performer. If a contestant receives three or more votes from the producers, they get the chance to go to I-Land; otherwise, they go to Ground. However, if more than 12 contestants received enough votes to get a chance to go to I-Land after the entrance test is complete, those who were voted to enter I-Land must choose a certain number, based on the number of producer and director votes received, of contestants among themselves to keep in I-Land. Those with the fewest votes would be moved to Ground until only 12 remain.

Color key

- I-Land
- Contestant moved to "I-Land" but was voted off and moved to "Ground"
- Ground

Entrance Test (Episode 1)
Order	Song	Original Artist	Contestant	Votes	Results
1	"Unforgiven"	Le Sserafim	Kim Minsol	4/5	Moved Out
1	"Unforgiven"	Le Sserafim	Ryu Sarang	5/5	I-Land
1	"Unforgiven"	Le Sserafim	Um Jiwon	2/5	Ground
1	"Unforgiven"	Le Sserafim	Son Juwon	4/5	I-Land
2	"After Like"	Ive	Kim Gyuri	5/5	I-Land
2	"After Like"	Ive	Fuko	5/5	I-Land
2	"After Like"	Ive	Park Yeeun	0/5	Ground
2	"After Like"	Ive	Kim Chaeeun	1/5	Ground
2	"After Like"	Ive	Kang Jiwon	1/5	Ground
3	"Sweet Venom"	Enhypen	Lingling	2/5	Ground
3	"Sweet Venom"	Enhypen	Jeong Saebi	4/5	I-Land
3	"Sweet Venom"	Enhypen	Oh Yuna	0/5	Ground
3	"Sweet Venom"	Enhypen	Kim Sujung	5/5	I-Land
4	"Cake"	Itzy	Yuiko	3/5	Moved Out
4	"Cake"	Itzy	Kim Eunchae	3/5	Moved Out
4	"Cake"	Itzy	Choi Soul	3/5	Moved Out
4	"Cake"	Itzy	Nana	0/5	Ground
5	"Baggy Jeans"	NCT U	Yui	3/5	I-Land
5	"Baggy Jeans"	NCT U	Koko	3/5	I-Land
5	"Baggy Jeans"	NCT U	Nam Yuju	2/5	Ground
6	"Drama"	Aespa	Bang Jeemin	5/5	I-Land
6	"Drama"	Aespa	Choi Jungeun	5/5	I-Land
6	"Drama"	Aespa	Mai	4/5	I-Land
6	"Drama"	Aespa	Yoon Jiyoon	4/5	I-Land

Key

I	Producer vote: I
✘	Producer vote: Out
	Contestant who received an ALL I
	Contestant who received an ALL OUT

Results Board - Entrance Test (Episode 1)
Contestant	Producers			Directors	
Contestant	VVN	24	Taeyang	Monika	Lee Jung
Kim Minsol	I	I	I	✘	I
Ryu Sarang	I	I	I	I	I
Um Jiwon	I	I	✘	✘	✘
Son Juwon	I	I	I	I	✘
Kim Gyuri	I	I	I	I	I
Fuko	I	I	I	I	I
Park Yeeun	✘	✘	✘	✘	✘
Kim Chaeeun	✘	✘	✘	I	✘
Kang Jiwon	I	✘	✘	✘	✘
Lingling	✘	✘	I	✘	I
Jeong Saebi	I	✘	I	I	I
Oh Yuna	✘	✘	✘	✘	✘
Kim Sujung	I	I	I	I	I
Yuiko	✘	✘	I	I	I
Kim Eunchae	I	✘	✘	I	I
Choi Soul	✘	✘	I	I	I
Nana	✘	✘	✘	✘	✘
Yui	I	I	✘	I	✘
Koko	I	I	I	✘	✘
Nam Yuju	I	✘	I	✘	✘
Bang Jeemin	I	I	I	I	I
Mai	I	✘	I	I	I
Yoon Jiyoon	I	I	I	✘	I
Choi Jungeun	I	I	I	I	I

==== Signal Song Test ====
For this mission, all of I-Land is one unit, and all of Ground is another unit. Both units have to perform the signal song of the show, Final Love Song. The parts for this mission is decided by the highest ranking contestant from the previous mission in I-Land, being Jungeun, and in Ground, all the contestants vote for a leader to make the part decisions. For the I-Land performance, each I-Lander gets assessed individually by the producers and the directors, based on how well they executed their parts in the performance of the Signal Song. The average score that the I-Landers receive as a team determines how many people will be demoted from I-Land; the lower the average score, the more demotion candidates there would be. The I-Landers received an average score of 84(.5), therefore three I-Landers would get moved out of I-Land by the I-Landers own votes. Each I-Lander would receive three votes to use to choose who to keep in I-Land and following the vote, the three I-Landers with the fewest votes would be demoted to Ground, which would open up three spots in I-Land for replacement contestants from Ground. The producers and directors would then watch the Grounders performance and choose three of them to replace the demoted I-Landers.

Color key

- Contestant got promoted to I-Land by producer and director choice
- Contestant got demoted to Ground by I-Lander vote

Signal Song Test (Episode 2)
Part	I-Lander		Grounder	
Part	Contestant	Score	Contestant	Score
Center	Son Juwon	92	Nam Yuju	Undisclosed
Main Vocalist	Choi Jungeun	96	Um Jiwon	Undisclosed
Main Dancer	Kim Sujung	80	Kim Minsol	Undisclosed
Part 4	Fuko	75	Kim Eunchae	Undisclosed
Part 5	Kim Gyuri	78	Choi Soul	Undisclosed
Part 6	Yui	75	Yuiko	Undisclosed
Part 7	Ryu Sarang	83	Kim Chaeeun	Undisclosed
Part 8	Bang Jeemin	93	Park Yeeun	Undisclosed
Part 9	Koko	86	Lingling	Undisclosed
Part 10	Jeong Saebi	79	Oh Yuna	Undisclosed
Part 11	Yoon Jiyoon	88	Kang Jiwon	Undisclosed
Part 12	Mai	90	Nana	Undisclosed

==== Seesaw Game ====
For this mission, both the I-Landers and the Grounders will be divided into two units. The units will be decided based on whoever the I-Landers and Grounders partnered up with for team-building activities prior to the mission; in other words, partners cannot be in the same unit. Each partner duo have to decide between each other which unit to be in based on the song they'd have to perform. Both I-Land and Ground will each get two songs each, for a total of four songs overall. The I-Landers received Whistle by Blackpink and Panorama by Iz*One, while the Grounders received Bad Boy by Red Velvet and Like Ooh-Ahh by Twice. The parts for this mission are decided by the leader of each unit, which was decided through a vote. Each contestant is assessed individually and the combined score of all six members determines the unit score. In I-Land, if one unit defeats the other, by having a higher unit score, all the members of the defeated unit will all move down to Ground, while for Ground, the members of the winning unit will all go up to I-Land in a similar fashion to promotion and relegation. After all the necessary contestants have been moved between I-Land to Ground, the first elimination of the show will take place where the two contestants with the lowest scores from either of the losing units would be eliminated from the show.

Color key

- Winning Team, I-Land
- Losing Team, Ground
- Eliminated from the show

Seesaw Game (Episode 3-4)
Section	Part	Contestant	Song	Original Artist	Score		Part	Contestant	Song	Original Artist	Score	
Section	Part	Contestant	Song	Original Artist	Individual	Unit	Part	Contestant	Song	Original Artist	Individual	Unit
I-Lander	Center	Bang Jeemin	"Whistle"	Blackpink	82	490	Center	Jeong Saebi	"Panorama"	Iz*One	93	518
I-Lander	Main Vocal	Ryu Sarang	"Whistle"	Blackpink	84	490	Main Vocal	Choi Jungeun	"Panorama"	Iz*One	83	518
I-Lander	Main Dance	Kim Sujung	"Whistle"	Blackpink	84	490	Main Dance	Son Juwon	"Panorama"	Iz*One	83	518
I-Lander	Part 4	Yui	"Whistle"	Blackpink	91	490	Part 4	Choi Soul	"Panorama"	Iz*One	83	518
I-Lander	Part 5	Kim Minsol	"Whistle"	Blackpink	68	490	Part 5	Mai	"Panorama"	Iz*One	88	518
I-Lander	Part 6	Nam Yuju	"Whistle"	Blackpink	81	490	Part 6	Koko	"Panorama"	Iz*One	88	518
Grounder	Center	Fuko	"Bad Boy"	Red Velvet	88	459	Center	Kim Gyuri	"Like Ooh-Ahh"	Twice	84	435
Grounder	Main Vocal	Kang Jiwon	"Bad Boy"	Red Velvet	63	459	Main Vocal	Yoon Jiyoon	"Like Ooh-Ahh"	Twice	71	435
Grounder	Main Dance	Um Jiwon	"Bad Boy"	Red Velvet	82	459	Main Dance	Oh Yuna	"Like Ooh-Ahh"	Twice	76	435
Grounder	Part 4	Nana	"Bad Boy"	Red Velvet	74	459	Part 4	Kim Chaeeun	"Like Ooh-Ahh"	Twice	72	435
Grounder	Part 5	Park Yeeun	"Bad Boy"	Red Velvet	79	459	Part 5	Kim Eunchae	"Like Ooh-Ahh"	Twice	65	435
Grounder	Part 6	Lingling	"Bad Boy"	Red Velvet	73	459	Part 6	Yuiko	"Like Ooh-Ahh"	Twice	67	435

==== Unit Battle ====
For this mission, both the I-Landers and the Grounders will have to divide themselves up into three units, a vocal unit consisting of two people, a dance unit consisting of three people, and a creative unit consisting of the rest of I-Land or Ground. The I-Land unit of one category would go up against the respective matching unit from Ground. The vocal units receive one song each, the dance units; two each, and the creative units get the same song. The creative unit has the extra job of creating their own choreography from scratch for the song they receive. Each contestant is assessed individually and the average score of all of the contestants in the unit would determine the unit score, which was always rounded down to the whole number. For every I-Land unit that receives a lower unit score than the matching Ground unit, three members from I-Land would be demoted down to Ground following all of the performances. This would make for a maximum of nine contestants' demotions from I-Land. The amount of promotions from Ground would match the amount of demoted I-Landers. The demoted contestants would be decided by whichever contestants had the lowest scores from I-Land, and the promoted contestants would be decided by whichever contestants had the highest scores from Ground. After all the necessary contestants have been moved between I-Land to Ground, the second elimination of the show will take place where the two contestants from Ground with the lowest individual scores would be eliminated from the show.

Color key

- Winning Team
- Losing Team
- Contestant got demoted from I-Land to Ground
- Contestant got promoted from Ground to I-Land
- Eliminated from the show

Unit Battle (Episode 4-5)
Unit	I-Lander					Grounder				
Unit	Contestant	Song	Original Artist	Score		Contestant	Song	Original Artist	Score	
Unit	Contestant	Song	Original Artist	Individual	Unit	Contestant	Song	Original Artist	Individual	Unit
Vocal	Fuko	"Fine"	Taeyeon	94	91	Yoon Jiyoon	"Eyes, Nose, Lips"	Taeyang	98	92
Vocal	Choi Jungeun	"Fine"	Taeyeon	89	91	Kim Minsol	"Eyes, Nose, Lips"	Taeyang	86	92
Dance	Koko	"My Bag" + "Eve, Psyche & the Bluebeard's Wife"	(G)I-dle + Le Sserafim	92	83	Yui	"Mic Drop" + "Sugarcoat"	BTS + Natty (Kiss of Life)	93	89
Dance	Son Juwon	"My Bag" + "Eve, Psyche & the Bluebeard's Wife"	(G)I-dle + Le Sserafim	82	83	Ryu Sarang	"Mic Drop" + "Sugarcoat"	BTS + Natty (Kiss of Life)	89	89
Dance	Um Jiwon	"My Bag" + "Eve, Psyche & the Bluebeard's Wife"	(G)I-dle + Le Sserafim	76	83	Oh Yuna	"Mic Drop" + "Sugarcoat"	BTS + Natty (Kiss of Life)	86	89
Creative	Mai	"Rain on Me"	Lady Gaga & Ariana Grande	95	84	Bang Jeemin	"Rain on Me"	Lady Gaga & Ariana Grande	88	83
Creative	Jeong Saebi	"Rain on Me"	Lady Gaga & Ariana Grande	92	84	Kim Sujung	"Rain on Me"	Lady Gaga & Ariana Grande	87	83
Creative	Lingling	"Rain on Me"	Lady Gaga & Ariana Grande	92	84	Nam Yuju	"Rain on Me"	Lady Gaga & Ariana Grande	87	83
Creative	Choi Soul	"Rain on Me"	Lady Gaga & Ariana Grande	85	84	Kim Gyuri	"Rain on Me"	Lady Gaga & Ariana Grande	83	83
Creative	Park Yeeun	"Rain on Me"	Lady Gaga & Ariana Grande	83	84	Kim Chaeeun	"Rain on Me"	Lady Gaga & Ariana Grande	74	83
Creative	Nana (Note: Nana and Kang Jiwon were demoted from I-Land to Ground, then were eliminated from the show.)	"Rain on Me"	Lady Gaga & Ariana Grande	72	84		"Rain on Me"	Lady Gaga & Ariana Grande		83
Creative	Kang Jiwon	"Rain on Me"	Lady Gaga & Ariana Grande	69	84		"Rain on Me"	Lady Gaga & Ariana Grande		83

==== 1:1 Position Battle ====
Right after the relocation of contestants from the results of the Unit Battle, the producers introduce a lyric writing mini mission to the contestants for the original song, I Will Always Love You (IWALY). The winner of this mini mission gets their written lyrics featured in the song, their name featured as a co-lyricist of the song, and the benefit of choosing whatever part they want, regardless of what the other contestants chose for their desired part, when it came time to choose for this mission. Fuko is revealed as the winner of the mini mission, and the I-Landers proceed to choosing their desired team and parts, in the order of the producer-formulated ranking. After the other 11 contestants have chosen their desired parts, Fuko, as the winner of the mini mission, gets to choose whatever part she wants, whether it was occupied already or not. She chose Team A's center, therefore moving Jiyoon, who previously selected that part, to the final empty part of the mission, being Team B's Main Vocalist. The contestants who selected the same part on different teams, e.g. Team A's Center and Team B's Center, are compared by the producers following the performances and the winner of the matchup, or the person who performed the part better, automatically advances to Part 2 of the show. The loser of the matchup gets demoted to Ground and will have to wait for the results of the 1st Save Vote to be revealed, alongside the Grounders. For the Grounders, their performance was more of "a final performance to impress the audience to have them vote for you" instead of having some of them replace the demoted I-Landers. Their parts were decided by their leader, which was decided through a vote, and they were not assessed directly by the producers during and after their performance.

Color key

- Advanced to Part 2 (Producer's Pick)
- Demoted to Ground
- Grounder's Leader

1:1 Position Battle (Episode 6)
Part	I-Lander		Grounder	Song	Production Credit
Part	Team A	Team B	Grounder	Song	Production Credit
Center	Fuko	Yui	Um Jiwon	"IWALY"	Lyrics & Composition: VVN, Teddy, Danny Chung, Fuko; Choreography: Lee Leejung
Main Vocalist	Kim Sujung	Yoon Jiyoon	Kim Gyuri	"IWALY"	Lyrics & Composition: VVN, Teddy, Danny Chung, Fuko; Choreography: Lee Leejung
Main Dancer	Jeong Saebi	Koko	Son Juwon	"IWALY"	Lyrics & Composition: VVN, Teddy, Danny Chung, Fuko; Choreography: Lee Leejung
Part 4	Bang Jeemin	Ryu Sarang	Park Yeeun	"IWALY"	Lyrics & Composition: VVN, Teddy, Danny Chung, Fuko; Choreography: Lee Leejung
Part 5	Choi Jungeun	Lingling	Oh Yuna	"IWALY"	Lyrics & Composition: VVN, Teddy, Danny Chung, Fuko; Choreography: Lee Leejung
Part 6	Mai	Nam Yuju	Kim Chaeeun	"IWALY"	Lyrics & Composition: VVN, Teddy, Danny Chung, Fuko; Choreography: Lee Leejung
Part 7			Kim Minsol	"IWALY"	Lyrics & Composition: VVN, Teddy, Danny Chung, Fuko; Choreography: Lee Leejung
Part 8			Choi Soul	"IWALY"	Lyrics & Composition: VVN, Teddy, Danny Chung, Fuko; Choreography: Lee Leejung

==== 1st Save Vote ====
The Grounders, after the final mission of Part 1, have been waiting to find out the results of the 1st Save Vote, where each I-Mate can vote for 6 contestants that they want to advance to Part 2 daily. A total of 50% of each contestant's points are based on Korean votes and the other 50% is based on international votes. The two vote counts would be added together and converted into a points total for each contestant. The contestants with the top 6 highest points totals would automatically advance to Part 2, while the rest of the contestants would be eliminated from the show.

Color key

- Advanced to Part 2 (I-Mate Votes)
- Eliminated from the show

1st Save Vote (Episode 7)
Rank	Contestant	Votes		Total Points 50% Korea + 50% Global
Rank	Contestant	Korea	Global	Total Points 50% Korea + 50% Global
1	Bang Jeemin	122,696	885,334	2,015,422
2	Koko	106,243	814,534	1,799,728
3	Nam Yuju	97,382	810,494	1,722,383
4	Kim Sujung	92,271	778,049	1,643,478
5	Son Juwon	59,927	514,243	1,077,549
6	Kim Gyuri	70,079	405,157	1,036,676
7	Yui	59,921	470,910	1,028,156
8	Park Yeeun	57,933	220,465	726,653
9	Kim Minsol	46,502	247,409	663,490
10	Lingling	17,210	266,378	444,613
11	Um Jiwon	20,229	142,973	328,876
12	Choi Soul	20,793	132,223	321,266
13	Kim Chaeeun	23,809	77,303	283,488
14	Oh Yuna	14,885	73,464	205,854

=== Part 2 ===
The second part of the show tells the I-Landers that there will initially be 6 members in the debut lineup. By the end of Part 2 though, there turns out to be 7 members in the debut lineup, but when Part 2 starts, the I-Landers are unaware of this fact. Within I-Land, the 12 contestants who advanced from the first part will all be assigned rooms based on their ranking; the higher the ranking, the better the amenities their room will contain. In addition, the producers can now watch the trainees prepare for each test in real time in a secret room within the I-Land building. Immediately after each test, the results of each contestant will be revealed. The top six trainees will all wear a badge that symbolizes that they would be part of the debut group if the show were to end there, but the ownership of the badges can change depending on the results of each mission, which determines who gets to be part of the top 6.

==== Black Made Test ====
For this mission, the contestants were divided up by the producers into three groups of four, and each group was automatically given a song, without opinion from any of the contestants. Each unit's leader was automatically decided by the producers as well, while the contestants in each group decided the parts amongst themselves. Instead of performing on the I-Stage from Part 1, the place where the I-Stage used to be were three vans used to transport each unit to a new performance stage (CJ ENM Ilsan Studio). Each contestant was scored individually, 50% of their score came from the 233 I-Mates votes who attended the performance in real time, and the other 50% of their points came from the producer-given score. The I-Mate score is determined by how many votes each contestant gets, the contestant with the most votes, or first place, would get 100 points and each place downwards would get two points less, until twelfth place, getting 78 points. The producer-given score would then be added onto the I-Mate score and the sum would become their total score. The contestants are then ordered by their total score for their rankings, following the Black Made Test.

Black Made Test (Episode 8-9)
Team	Original Artist	Position	Contestant	I-MATE		Producer Score	Total Score	Rank
Team	Original Artist	Position	Contestant	Votes	Score	Producer Score	Total Score	Rank
"La Vie en Rose"	Iz*One	Center/Leader	Bang Jeemin	207	100	95	195	1
"La Vie en Rose"	Iz*One	Main Vocalist	Fuko	191	92	85	177	5
"La Vie en Rose"	Iz*One	Main Dancer	Ryu Sarang	174	88	81	169	7
"La Vie en Rose"	Iz*One	Part 4	Kim Gyuri	173	86	86	172	6
"I Am the Best"	2NE1	Center/Leader	Yoon Jiyoon	193	94	90	184	4
"I Am the Best"	2NE1	Main Vocalist	Kim Sujung	153	82	82	164	9
"I Am the Best"	2NE1	Main Dancer	Son Juwon	131	78	79	157	12
"I Am the Best"	2NE1	Part 4	Mai	158	84	75	159	11
"Lovesick Girls"	Blackpink	Center/Leader	Jeong Saebi	197	98	90	188	3
"Lovesick Girls"	Blackpink	Main Vocalist	Choi Jungeun	145	80	85	165	8
"Lovesick Girls"	Blackpink	Main Dancer	Nam Yuju	176	90	73	163	10
"Lovesick Girls"	Blackpink	Part 4	Koko	196	96	93	189	2

==== Main Position Test ====
For this mission, the contestants were divided up by the producers into four groups of varying numbers of contestants, and each group was automatically given a song, again, also by the producers. Each unit's leader was the contestant with the highest ranking from the previous mission. The parts for this mission were chosen by the contestants in their ranking order from best to worst. Each contestant was scored individually, 50% of their score came from the 300 I-Mates votes who attended the performance in real time, and the other 50% of their points came from the producer-given score. The I-Mate score is determined by how many votes each contestant gets, the contestant with the most votes, or first place, would get 100 points and each place downwards would get two points less, until twelfth place, getting 78 points. The producer-given score would then be added onto the I-Mate score and the sum would become their total score. The contestants are then ordered by their total score for their rankings, following the Main Position Test.

Main Position Test (Episode 9)
Unit	Song	Original Artist	Position	Contestant	I-MATE		Producer Score	Total Score	Rank
Unit	Song	Original Artist	Position	Contestant	Votes	Score	Producer Score	Total Score	Rank
All-Rounder	"4 Walls"	f(x)	Center/Leader	Fuko	250	96	82	178	4
All-Rounder	"4 Walls"	f(x)	Part 2	Kim Gyuri	233	88	89	177	5
All-Rounder	"4 Walls"	f(x)	Part 3	Ryu Sarang	238	92	84	176	6
Main Rap	"Spicy"	CL	Part 1/Leader	Koko	266	100	96	196	1
Main Rap	"Spicy"	CL	Part 2	Nam Yuju	200	84	80	164	8
Main Dance	"Money"	Lisa	Center/Leader	Bang Jeemin	252	98	97	195	2
Main Dance	"Money"	Lisa	Part 2	Jeong Saebi	243	94	81	175	7
Main Dance	"Money"	Lisa	Part 3	Kim Sujung	150	78	77	155	12
Main Dance	"Money"	Lisa	Part 4	Mai	204	86	77	163	9
Main Dance	"Money"	Lisa	Part 5	Son Juwon	195	82	77	159	11
Main Vocal	"If I Were A Boy"	Beyoncé	Part 1/Leader	Yoon Jiyoon	237	90	91	181	3
Main Vocal	"If I Were A Boy"	Beyoncé	Part 2	Choi Jungeun	187	80	80	160	10

==== Self-Made Test ====
For this semi-final mission, the whole concept of the mission was to have the contestants take care of creating everything that was to be part of their unit's final performance, from the costumes and makeup, to set design and even part distribution. The contestants started by having to divide themselves up into two units of six. Each unit's leader and center was the first and second ranking contestant from the previous mission, being Koko and Jeemin respectively. The rest of the contestants of each unit were chosen in alternate by the two leaders, starting with Koko due to her higher rank. After the units were fully formed, the units were to decide between 9 songs to perform, selecting one as their choice. They were able to choose between 'Into the New World', 'Bad Girl Good Girl', 'Happiness', 'Latata', 'Dalla Dalla', 'Black Mamba', 'Eleven', 'Fearless', and 'Attention'. Koko's unit had the privilege of getting priority when choosing their units song due to Koko's higher ranking, meaning if Jeemin's unit were to want the same song, they wouldn't be able to have it. The contestants were not assessed directly during and after their performances. Following the performances, the results of the 2nd Save Vote were shown, and three contestants were marked safe through the Save Vote. Directly after this reveal, the producers selected their seven picks out of the nine remaining contestants for a total of ten contestants who will be able to participate in the final episode test.

Color key

- Advanced to the final (I-Mate's Vote)
- Advanced to the final (Producer's Pick)
- Eliminated from the show

Self-Made Test (Episode 10)
Team	Original Artist	Contestant	Rank
"Latata"	(G)I-dle	Koko	5
"Latata"	(G)I-dle	Choi Jungeun	2
"Latata"	(G)I-dle	Yoon Jiyoon	3
"Latata"	(G)I-dle	Nam Yuju	10
"Latata"	(G)I-dle	Kim Sujung	Eliminated
"Latata"	(G)I-dle	Son Juwon	Eliminated
"Into the New World"	Girls' Generation	Bang Jeemin	1
"Into the New World"	Girls' Generation	Fuko	4
"Into the New World"	Girls' Generation	Kim Gyuri	6
"Into the New World"	Girls' Generation	Ryu Sarang	7
"Into the New World"	Girls' Generation	Jeong Saebi	8
"Into the New World"	Girls' Generation	Mai	9

==== 2nd Save Vote ====
Each viewer can vote for 3 contestants that they want to advance to the final daily. A total of 50% of each contestant's points are based on Korean votes and the other 50% is based on international votes. The two vote counts would be added together and converted into a points total for each contestant. During the live airing of Episode 10, all votes done by the viewers were tripled in impact. The contestants with the top 3 highest points totals would automatically advance to the final, while the rest of the contestants would have to wait for the producer's contestant choices following the reveal of 2nd Save Vote results.

Color key

- Advanced to the final through 2nd Save Vote

2nd Save Vote (Episode 10)
Rank	Contestant	Total 50% Korea + 50% Global
1	Bang Jeemin	3,234,171
2	Choi Jungeun	2,647,246
3	Yoon Jiyoon	2,635,024
4	Koko	2,208,981
5	Jeong Saebi	2,195,959
6	Fuko	1,972,168
7	Ryu Sarang	1,662,417
8	Mai	1,563,314
9	Nam Yuju	1,090,764
10	Kim Gyuri	1,047,801
11	Kim Sujung	969,390
12	Son Juwon	739,420

==== Produced by Teddy Test ====
For this final mission, the contestants were shown two original songs produced by Teddy to perform. The members of each unit and their parts were pre-decided by Teddy himself. Each unit's leader was decided through a vote by the group members. The contestants were not assessed directly during and after their performances. Following the performances, the results of the Final Save Vote were shown, and five contestants were marked safe through the Save Vote. Directly after this reveal, the producers selected their two more picks out of the five remaining contestants for a total of seven contestants who will be part of the final debut group: Izna.

The name Izna is derived from the words "whenever, wherever, whatever". It alludes to the fact that the group aims to be one with no limits to their confidence.

Color key

- Debuting contestants (I-Mate's Vote)
- Debuting contestants (Producer's Pick)
- Eliminated from the show

Produced by Teddy Test (Episode 11)
Team	Part	Contestant	Rank
"Fake It"	Center	Jeong Saebi	7
"Fake It"	Main Vocalist	Choi Jungeun	1
"Fake It"	Main Rapper	Ryu Sarang	5
"Fake It"	Part 4	Fuko	Eliminated
"Fake It"	Part 5	Mai	6
"Drip"	Center	Bang Jeemin	2
"Drip"	Main Vocalist	Yoon Jiyoon	3
"Drip"	Main Rapper	Koko	4
"Drip"	Part 4	Nam Yuju	Eliminated
"Drip"	Part 5	Kim Gyuri	Eliminated

==== Final Save Vote ====
Each viewer can vote for only one contestant daily. A total of 50% of each contestant's points are based on Korean votes and the other 50% is based on international votes. The two vote counts would be added together and converted into a points total for each contestant. During the live airing of Episode 11, all votes done by the viewers were tripled in impact. From six contestants who will debut, 5 contestants will be selected from global votes, while one contestant will be chosen by the producers. After the six contestants were announced, it was revealed that the producers decided to pick one more contestant to join the final lineup.

Color key

- Debuting contestants (Final Save Vote)
- Debuting contestants (Producer's Pick)
- Eliminated from the show

Final Save Vote (Episode 11)
Rank	Contestant	Total 50% Korea + 50% Global
1	Choi Jungeun	823,393
2	Bang Jeemin	591,495
3	Yoon Jiyoon	471,699
4	Koko	320,124
5	Ryu Sarang	319,693
6	Jeong Saebi	294,721
7	Mai	289,062
8	Fuko	286,177
9	Nam Yuju	240,143
10	Kim Gyuri	172,862

== Ratings ==
Average TV viewership ratings (Nationwide)
Ep.	Original broadcast date	Average audience share (Nielsen Korea)
1	April 18, 2024	0.182% (228th)
2	April 25, 2024	N/A
3	May 2, 2024	N/A
4	May 9, 2024	0.163% (265th)
5	May 16, 2024	0.176% (242nd)
6	May 23, 2024	0.283% (121st)
7	June 6, 2024	N/A
8	June 13, 2024	0.208% (203rd)
9	June 20, 2024	0.224% (191st)
10	June 27, 2024	0.311% (110th)
11	July 4, 2024	N/A
Average		—
In the table above, the blue numbers represent the lowest ratings and the red numbers represent the highest ratings.; N/A denotes ratings that were below the full rank, so they were not published.; This series aired on a cable channel/pay TV which normally has a relatively smaller audience compared to free-to-air TV/public broadcasters (KBS, SBS, MBC and EBS).

== Aftermath ==
- The final group, Izna will be active for 7 years and is managed by WakeOne Entertainment. The group debuted on November 25, 2024, with the extended play (EP) N/a.
  - Yoon Ji-yoon (3rd) left the group on August 19, 2025 after a six-month hiatus due to health reasons.
Other contestants, other activities
- Some contestants left their companies or joined new ones:
  - The majority of the eliminated contestants have been confirmed to have left WakeOne Entertainment
    - Fuko (8th) joined THE L1VE Label.
    - Nam Yuju (9th) returned to Evermore Entertainment.
    - Son Juwon (12th), Yui (13th), and Um Jiwon (17th) joined AOMG.
    - Park Yeeun (14th) joined High Up Entertainment.
    - Lingling (16th) joined LeanBranding.
    - Kim Chaeeun (19th) signed with Leaders Entertainment as an entertainer.
- Some contestants will debut or debuted in new girl groups or released music as solo artists:
  - Fuko (8th) will reportedly debut in The L1VE Label's upcoming girl group.
  - Son Juwon (12th), under the stage name Son Juone, Yui (13th), under the stage name Newy, and Um Jiwon (17th), under the stage name Um Jione, debuted as members of AOMG's new girl group, Keyveatz with their first EP OXY_GEN with the title track 'OXY' on June 30, 2026, following the release of their pre-release digital single Key Beats on April 29, 2026.
  - Park Yeeun (14th) debuted as a member of High Up Entertainment's new girl group, UNCHILD with their first single album We Are UNCHILD with the self-titled title track on April 21, 2026.
  - Lingling (16th) debuted as a member of LeanBranding's new girl group, Kiiras with the single album 'Kill Ma Bo$$' with a title track of the same name on May 29, 2025.

Some contestants left the idol industry or further expanded their careers in the acting/entertainment industry:

  - Kim Chaeeun (19th) was featured in Wave to Earth's music video for 'courage', released on August 6, 2026.
- Some contestants participated in other survival shows:
  - Nam Yuju (9th) participated in Mnet’s Korean rap survival show Unpretty Rapstar: HIP POP Princess. She debuted as a member of the winning girl group Hiipe Princess under Chapter-I, after ranking 1st place.
