= Vivian Cha =

South Korean fashion model, songwriter and record producer

- Born: Cha Hyun-jung; 5 November 1993 (age 32); Seoul, South Korea
- Other name: VVN
- Education: Berklee College of Music
- Occupations: Fashion model; songwriter; record Producer
- Spouse: Kush (m. 2025)
- Relatives: Kwon Yu-ri (cousin)
- Modeling information
- Height: 5 ft 7 in (1.70 m)
- Hair color: Brown
- Eye color: Brown
- Agency: The Black Label (South Korea)

Korean name
- Hangul: 차현정
- RR: Cha Hyeonjeong
- MR: Ch'a Hyŏnjŏng

Cha Hyun-jung (Korean: 차현정; born November 5, 1993) also known as Vivian Cha or VVN is a South Korean fashion model, songwriter, and record producer. In August 2015, she made her debut in The 18th Magazine CéCi Model Contest.

== Career ==
Vivian's modeling career began when she was 21 years old after she was chosen as No.1 of the 18th Model Contest by Magazine CéCi. She started her first modeling career with Magazine CéCi, Cosmopolitan and LEON. She was the face of Barrel in 2016 together with her cousin, Girls' Generation member Kwon Yuri. Vivian was also a model for BMW Mini Korea. She has appeared on the talk show Get it Beauty, and the reality show Attraction TV on Channel Onstyle.

== Personal life ==
On October 11, 2025, Vivian married The Black Label co-founder and producer Kush after dating for nine years.

== Discography ==
=== Songwriting and production credits ===
Credits are adapted from the Korean Music Copyright Association database. VVN's search ID is 10022205.

Year	Artist	Song	Album				
Year	Artist	Song	Album	2017	Daesung	"Soba Ni Iteyo"	"Delight 2"
2018	Jo Hyunah	"After You"					
2019	Imfact	"Only U"	Only U				
2019	Imfact	"Na Na Na"	Only U				
2019	Imfact	"Bich Na"	Only U				
2019	Henry	"I luv u"	I Luv U				
2020	Nature	"Girls"	Nature World: Code M				
2020	Nature	"BBB"	Nature World: Code M				
2020	Nature	"Dive"	Nature World: Code M				
2020	Nature	"I'm Done"	Nature World: Code M				
2020	Nature	"You Right"	Nature World: Code M				
2021	Park Bom	"DoReMiFaSol"					
2022	Big Bang	Still Life					
2022	Blackpink	Yeah Yeah Yeah	Born Pink				
2022	Blackpink	Ready For Love	Born Pink				
2022	PSY	"Everyday"					
2023	Jisoo	Flower	Me				
2023	Jisoo	All Eyes On Me	Me				
2023	Heize	"VingleVingle" (Prod. R.Tee)					
2023	Jeon Somi	"FXXKED Up"	Game Plan				
2024	izna	"IWALY"	N/a				
2024	izna	"Fake It"	N/a				
2024	izna	"Drip"	N/a				
2025	izna	"Sign"					
2025	izna	"Supercrush"	Not Just Pretty				
2025	izna	"Mamma Mia"	Not Just Pretty				
2025	izna	"Racecar"	Not Just Pretty				
2025	izna	"In the Rain" (빗속에서)	Not Just Pretty				
2025	izna	"Sign (Remix)"	Not Just Pretty				
