= R U Next? =

South Korean reality competition series

- Promotional poster
- Hangul: 알유넥스트
- RR: Al yu nekseuteu
- MR: Al yu neksŭt'ŭ
- Genre: Reality competition
- Presented by: Choi Soo-young
- Opening theme: "R.U.N" (전속력으로) by Suzy
- Country of origin: South Korea
- Original language: Korean
- No. of episodes: 10

Production
- Running time: 90 minutes
- Production companies: Belift Lab (Note: A subsidiary of Hybe Corporation); Hybe; Studio JAMM (JTBC); Mushroom Company; YK Media Plus

Original release
- Network: JTBC
- Release: June 30 – September 1, 2023

R U Next? (Korean: 알유넥스트?) is a reality competition series organized by Belift Lab and JTBC. The program debuted the South Korean girl group Illit.

== Promotion and broadcast ==
On June 1, 2023, JTBC and Belift Lab announced that they had begun filming for the new survival program R U Next?, which aims to create the agency's next global girl group. The contestants would be assessed through seven rounds. On the same day, Girls' Generation's Choi Soo-young was confirmed as the show's host. On June 7, the official Twitter, Instagram and Weverse accounts for R U Next? opened and the first set of promotional posters were posted. An article was also released on the same day confirming the show would be containing seven missions and would also air through Wavve and Netflix in South Korea and Abema TV in Japan from June 30, at 8:50PM KST. On June 9, former Miss A member and actress, Bae Suzy, was confirmed to sing the signal song for R U Next?. It was released on June 12 at 6:00PM KST. Profiles of the twenty-two contestants were revealed on June 16, with individual profile photos and introduction videos.

=== Final lineup ===
After the performances of the final round, the six-member final lineup was decided through a combination of votes and label consideration. The six winners—Wonhee, Youngseo, Iroha, Yunah, Minju, and Moka—were chosen to become members of Illit, the first girl group under Belift Lab, and the third girl group to debut under Hybe after Le Sserafim and NewJeans. However, Youngseo left the pre-debut lineup which was announced on 5 January 2024, and hence the group was later confirmed to debut with the remaining five members. Illit debuted on March 25, 2024 and released their debut album, Super Real Me, with Hybe's chairman Bang Si-hyuk participating as producer of their album. The group's name "Illit" is the combination of the phrase, 'I will' and the word, 'it,' according to Hybe, which demonstrates the group's desire to go beyond their potential and strive to be what they want it to be.

== Cast ==
Host

- Choi Soo-young

Coaches

- Park Gyu-ri (Kara)
- Lee Hyun (8Eight)
- Jo Kwon (2AM)
- Kim Jae-hwan (Wanna One)
- Aiki
- Vincenzo
- Mandu

Guests

- NU'EST's Baekho – special coach for Round 2 (Episode 2-3)
- Jay Park – special coach for Round 3 (Episode 3-5)
- Enhypen's Jungwon – special coach for Round 4 (Episode 5-6)
- Heeseung – special coach for Round 4 (Episode 5-6)
- Seventeen's Woozi – special coach for Round 4 (Episode 5-6)
- Shin Kung – special coach for Round 6 (Episode 9)

== Contestants ==
Final members of Illit pre-debut
Eliminated in final episode
Eliminated in fifth elimination
Eliminated in fourth elimination
Eliminated in third elimination
Eliminated in second elimination
Eliminated in first elimination
Left the show

22 contestants
Wonhee (원희)	Youngseo (영서)	Minju (민주)	Iroha (이로하)	Moka (모카)
Yunah (윤아)	Jeongeun (정은)	Jeemin (지민)	Himena (히메나)	Jiwoo (지우)
Chanelle (사넬)	Jihyun (지현)	Funa (후우나)	Seoyeon (서연)	Hyewon (혜원)
Moa (모아)	Ruka (루카)	Yewon (예원)	Ena (에나)	Haseul (하슬)
Iris (아이리스)	Yuisa (유이사)			

== Profile ==
Name	Hangul	Age	Nationality	Prior to R U Next?
Jiwoo	지우	21	Korean	Appeared in a YouTube content (2020), majored in Broadcast entertainment at Dongduk Women's University
Funa	후우나	21	Japanese	Former Nizi Project contestant
Moa	모아	21	Thai	Former P Nation and SM Entertainment trainee
Chanelle	샤넬	20	Korean-American	Former Yuehua Entertainment trainee Appeared on JTBC's Stage K in 2019
Yunah	윤아	19	Korean	Former Source Music, Fantagio, Stardium and TS Entertainment trainee
Minju	민주	19	Korean	Former YG Entertainment trainee
Jeongeun	정은	18-19	Korean	Former Source Music trainee and child actress
Moka	모카	18	Japanese	Former Hybe Labels Japan trainee
Jihyun	지현	18	Korean	Pre-debut member of HOWZ; Former HOW Entertainment and Yuehua Entertainment trainee
Ruka	루카	18	Japanese	Former Cube Entertainment and Source Music trainee Pre-debut trainee lineup of Le Sserafim
Yewon	예원	18	Korean	Former Source Music trainee
Jeemin	지민	18	Korean	Former Source Music trainee
Hyewon	혜원	17	Korean	Former member of Little Cheer Girl
Youngseo	영서	17	Korean	Former Source Music and SM Entertainment trainee
Yuisa	유이사	16	Japanese	Former member of GOL☆HAF2
Wonhee	원희	16	Korean	Scouted by a Hybe employee at a bus station in February 2023 while visiting Seoul
Haseul	하슬	15	Korean-American	
Iroha	이로하	15	Japanese	Former JYP Entertainment trainee
Iris	아이리스	15	Thai	Ballroom dancer
Himena	히메나	15	Japanese	
Seoyeon	서연	15	Korean	
Ena	에나	12	Japanese	Former Hybe Labels Japan trainee

== Missions ==
=== Round 1: Tryout ===
- Episode 1-2

The try out is the gateway to see if you have the potential to become a member. The trainees have been divided into 7 different units with 3-4 members per unit. The tryouts will be evaluated within each unit. Each unit will be evaluated by the coaches after their performances. The unit members will then each be divided into three levels: High (H), Mid (M), and Low (L).

Tryout mission results
Performance			Group	Contestant	Ranking	
#	Artist(s)	Song(s)	Group	Contestant	Initial (Note: The initial rankings were given out prior to the start of the show based on the trainees' monthly evaluations.)	Level
Episode 1
1	Red Velvet	"Bad Boy"	Bad Me Girls (뱃미걸즈)	Jiwoo	5	L
1	Red Velvet	"Bad Boy"	Bad Me Girls (뱃미걸즈)	Jeongeun	8	H
1	Red Velvet	"Bad Boy"	Bad Me Girls (뱃미걸즈)	Chanelle	9	M
2	Itzy	"Dalla Dalla"	Powerful Kitties (파워꼬앙이)	Iroha	3	H
2	Itzy	"Dalla Dalla"	Powerful Kitties (파워꼬앙이)	Hyewon	13	M
2	Itzy	"Dalla Dalla"	Powerful Kitties (파워꼬앙이)	Jihyun	14	L
3	Aespa	"Dreams Come True"	16,200,000	Iris	16	H
3	Aespa	"Dreams Come True"	16,200,000	Ena	20	L
3	Aespa	"Dreams Come True"	16,200,000	Wonhee	00 (Note: Trainees with the rank 00 have not yet participated in monthly evaluations, therefore does not have a pre-show rank.)	M
3	Aespa	"Dreams Come True"	16,200,000	Seoyeon	00	H
4	(G)I-dle	"Tomboy"	I Want (아이원)	Moka	6	M
4	(G)I-dle	"Tomboy"	I Want (아이원)	Youngseo	7	H
4	(G)I-dle	"Tomboy"	I Want (아이원)	Moa	15	L
Episode 2
5	Apink	"Dumhdurum"	Not Shown	Funa	11	L
5	Apink	"Dumhdurum"	Not Shown	Ruka	12	H
5	Apink	"Dumhdurum"	Not Shown	Haseul	17	M
6	Miss A	"Bad Girl Good Girl"	MISS TOP	Jeemin	1	L
6	Miss A	"Bad Girl Good Girl"	MISS TOP	Yunah	2	H
6	Miss A	"Bad Girl Good Girl"	MISS TOP	Minju	4	M
7	Kara	"When I Move"	Not Shown	Himena	10	H
7	Kara	"When I Move"	Not Shown	Yewon	18	L (Note: Yewon was absent for this round due to COVID-19, therefore was automatically placed in Low Level.)
7	Kara	"When I Move"	Not Shown	Yuisa	19	M

=== Round 2: Death Match ===
- Episode 2-3

The theme of the mission is the debut title tracks of the 4th generation idol groups of Hybe. Within the three levels formed, 2 units will be formed. Two units will perform together with the same song. The unit that wins will get a benefit of extra points. Starting from this mission, there will be eliminations. Trainees in the Low Level will become elimination candidates.

The coaches chose the 1st and 2nd places by level after Round 1. The 1st and 2nd place of each level has the advantage of choosing the members of their unit. In selecting the songs the Low Level team chooses first, however higher teams can push aside the lower ranking teams if they want to select the same song.

A mini mission was carried out to decide the killing part for each song. Each contestant will carry out an expression audition in front of a camera to see how well they can leave an impression with the first verse of their mission songs and test their expressive skills. The contestants will vote amongst themselves to choose who gets the killing part.

Each coach will give scores to the individual trainees from 1 – 100 (up to a total individual score of 700). The average of the individual scores will be the overall team score, where higher team score will be the winner for each song. The winning unit receives an extra 50 points added on their individual score.

Color key

Winning Team
Killing Part

Bold denotes the contestant who picked the team members.

Death Match mission results
Performance			Group	Result		Contestant		
#	Artist(s)	Song(s)	Unit	Team	Individual (Note: Individual scores of the winning teams include the benefit points gained in this round.)	Name	Position	New level
1	Le Sserafim	"Fearless"	Mid - A	550.5	572	**Minju**	4	M
1	Le Sserafim	"Fearless"	Mid - A	550.5	440	Haseul	2	L
1	Le Sserafim	"Fearless"	Mid - A	550.5	626	Hyewon	1	H
1	Le Sserafim	"Fearless"	Mid - A	550.5	564	Wonhee	3	M
1	Le Sserafim	"Fearless"	Low - B	536.33	540	**Moa**	5	L
1	Le Sserafim	"Fearless"	Low - B	536.33	519	Funa	7	L
1	Le Sserafim	"Fearless"	Low - B	536.33	550	Yewon	6	L
2	NewJeans	"Attention"	High - A	589.5	581	**Yunah**	5	H
2	NewJeans	"Attention"	High - A	589.5	603	Jeongeun	7	H
2	NewJeans	"Attention"	High - A	589.5	599	Himena	6	H
2	NewJeans	"Attention"	High - A	589.5	575	Seoyeon	8	M
2	NewJeans	"Attention"	Mid - B	527	517	**Moka**	2	L
2	NewJeans	"Attention"	Mid - B	527	626	Chanelle	1	H
2	NewJeans	"Attention"	Mid - B	527	438	Yuisa	3	Eliminated (L)
3	Enhypen	"Given-Taken"	High - B	550	607	**Iroha**	6	H
3	Enhypen	"Given-Taken"	High - B	550	591	Youngseo	5	H
3	Enhypen	"Given-Taken"	High - B	550	539	Ruka	8	M
3	Enhypen	"Given-Taken"	High - B	550	463	Iris	7	L
3	Enhypen	"Given-Taken"	Low - A	545	552	**Jeemin**	3	M
3	Enhypen	"Given-Taken"	Low - A	545	573	Jihyun	1	M
3	Enhypen	"Given-Taken"	Low - A	545	606	Jiwoo	2	M
3	Enhypen	"Given-Taken"	Low - A	545	449	Ena	4	L

=== Round 3: All-Rounder ===
- Episode 3-5

The contestants will be divided into 3 units of 7 members each, regardless of their level. The three units will be performing two different genres, heel choreography and hip-hop. Each song for the heel choreography will include a mission prop.

The units are formed around each levels' 1st place trainee, Hyewon, Seoyeon and Yewon. The three leaders will have the power to decide the parts and flow of the practice sessions. The heel choreo songs are decided based on a flexibility test and hip hop songs are decided based on 'Show me the SWF' freestyle dance and rap competition, where the winning unit will choose the mission songs for all the units.

After each performance, each coach will give scores to the individual trainees from 1 – 100 (the total of individual scores will become the final unit score). The winning unit receives an extra 100 benefit points and the second place unit receives an extra 50 benefit points.

==== Mission 1: Heel Choreo ====
Winning Team
Killing Part

Bold denotes the contestant who picked the team members and acts as the team's leader.

Heel Choreo mission results
Performance				Group	Result		Contestant	
#	Artist(s)	Song(s)	Mission prop	Unit	Team	Individual	Name	Position
1	Chung Ha	"Dream of You"	Cane	Yewon's Unit	3660	500	**Yewon**	7
1	Chung Ha	"Dream of You"	Cane	Yewon's Unit	3660	529	Wonhee	6
1	Chung Ha	"Dream of You"	Cane	Yewon's Unit	3660	613	Jeemin	1
1	Chung Ha	"Dream of You"	Cane	Yewon's Unit	3660	509	Ruka	4
1	Chung Ha	"Dream of You"	Cane	Yewon's Unit	3660	543	Moka	2
1	Chung Ha	"Dream of You"	Cane	Yewon's Unit	3660	504	Funa	3
1	Chung Ha	"Dream of You"	Cane	Yewon's Unit	3660	462	Haseul	5
2	f(x)	"4 Walls"	Fan	Seoyeon's Unit	3688	547	**Seoyeon**	5
2	f(x)	"4 Walls"	Fan	Seoyeon's Unit	3688	566	Minju	2
2	f(x)	"4 Walls"	Fan	Seoyeon's Unit	3688	505	Moa	4
2	f(x)	"4 Walls"	Fan	Seoyeon's Unit	3688	598	Jiwoo	1
2	f(x)	"4 Walls"	Fan	Seoyeon's Unit	3688	611	Himena	3
2	f(x)	"4 Walls"	Fan	Seoyeon's Unit	3688	413	Iris	6
2	f(x)	"4 Walls"	Fan	Seoyeon's Unit	3688	448	Ena	7
3	Girls' Generation	"The Boys"	Hat	Hyewon's Unit	4419	632	**Hyewon**	1
3	Girls' Generation	"The Boys"	Hat	Hyewon's Unit	4419	613	Iroha	7
3	Girls' Generation	"The Boys"	Hat	Hyewon's Unit	4419	636	Yunah	3
3	Girls' Generation	"The Boys"	Hat	Hyewon's Unit	4419	657	Chanelle	2
3	Girls' Generation	"The Boys"	Hat	Hyewon's Unit	4419	640	Youngseo	6
3	Girls' Generation	"The Boys"	Hat	Hyewon's Unit	4419	616	Jeongeun	4
3	Girls' Generation	"The Boys"	Hat	Hyewon's Unit	4419	625	Jihyun	5

==== Mission 2: Hip Hop ====
Winning Team
Killing Part

Bold denotes the contestant who picked the team members and acts as the team's leader.

Hip Hop mission results
Performance			Group	Result		Contestant		
#	Artist(s)	Song(s)	Unit	Team	Individual	Name	Position	New level
1	(G)I-dle	"My Bag"	Yewon's Unit	3862	569	**Yewon**	1	L
1	(G)I-dle	"My Bag"	Yewon's Unit	3862	600	Wonhee	2	L
1	(G)I-dle	"My Bag"	Yewon's Unit	3862	525	Ruka	5	L
1	(G)I-dle	"My Bag"	Yewon's Unit	3862	593	Jeemin	3	M
1	(G)I-dle	"My Bag"	Yewon's Unit	3862	580	Moka	7	L
1	(G)I-dle	"My Bag"	Yewon's Unit	3862	521	Funa	4	L
1	(G)I-dle	"My Bag"	Yewon's Unit	3862	474	Haseul	6	Eliminated (L)
2	CL	"Tie a Cherry"	Seoyeon's Unit	3855	566	**Seoyeon**	2	M
2	CL	"Tie a Cherry"	Seoyeon's Unit	3855	579	Minju	1	M
2	CL	"Tie a Cherry"	Seoyeon's Unit	3855	569	Moa	5	L
2	CL	"Tie a Cherry"	Seoyeon's Unit	3855	575	Jiwoo	3	M
2	CL	"Tie a Cherry"	Seoyeon's Unit	3855	639	Himena	4	M
2	CL	"Tie a Cherry"	Seoyeon's Unit	3855	453	Iris	7	Eliminated (L)
2	CL	"Tie a Cherry"	Seoyeon's Unit	3855	474	Ena	6	Eliminated (L)
3	Lisa	"Money"	Hyewon's Unit	4254	605	**Hyewon**	4	H
3	Lisa	"Money"	Hyewon's Unit	4254	631	Iroha	1	H
3	Lisa	"Money"	Hyewon's Unit	4254	581	Yunah	7	H
3	Lisa	"Money"	Hyewon's Unit	4254	603	Chanelle	5	H
3	Lisa	"Money"	Hyewon's Unit	4254	634	Youngseo	2	H
3	Lisa	"Money"	Hyewon's Unit	4254	588	Jeongeun	3	M
3	Lisa	"Money"	Hyewon's Unit	4254	612	Jihyun	6	H

=== Round 4: The Specialists ===
- Episode 5-6
Winning Team
Killing Part

Bold denotes the contestant who picked the team members and acts as the team's leader.

Vocal Battle Results
Performance			Result		Contestant		
#	Artist(s)	Song(s)	Team	Individual	Name	Ranking	New level
1	Baek Yerin	"Across the Universe"	3305	894	**Jiwoo**	1	H
1	Baek Yerin	"Across the Universe"	3305	835	Yunah	4	M
1	Baek Yerin	"Across the Universe"	3305	813	Jeongeun	5	L
1	Baek Yerin	"Across the Universe"	3305	763	Wonhee	7	M
2	Taeyeon	"Spark"	3105	628	**Yewon**	8	Eliminated (L)
2	Taeyeon	"Spark"	3105	863	Minju	2	M
2	Taeyeon	"Spark"	3105	838	Chanelle	3	M
2	Taeyeon	"Spark"	3105	776	Seoyeon	6	L

Dance Battle Results
Performance			Result		Contestant		
#	Artist(s)	Song(s)	Team	Individual	Name	Ranking	New level
1	After School	"Bang!"	3897	938	**Youngseo**	1	H
1	After School	"Bang!"	3897	884	Iroha	3	H
1	After School	"Bang!"	3897	830	Hyewon	7	L
1	After School	"Bang!"	3897	577	Ruka	10	Eliminated (L)
1	After School	"Bang!"	3897	668	Moa	9	Eliminated (L)
2	Wonder Girls	"Tell Me"	4237	902	**Jihyun**	2	H
2	Wonder Girls	"Tell Me"	4237	862	Jeemin	4	H
2	Wonder Girls	"Tell Me"	4237	831	Himena	6	L
2	Wonder Girls	"Tell Me"	4237	853	Moka	5	M
2	Wonder Girls	"Tell Me"	4237	789	Funa	8	L

=== Round 5: Concept Game ===
- Episode 7-8

This round consists of two missions, testing how well the contestants digest songs of different concepts that are represented through colors. The final results for this round is composed of 50% Color mission and 50% Black Mission.

==== Mission 1: Color mission ====
Starting from lower-ranked contestants to the higher-ranked contestants, the contestants choose their desired songs based on the color of the room, which indicates the concept of the song, as well as the artist pictured on the outside of a door. The higher-ranked contestants must push out a member if there are more than five people in a room.

Within each group, each contestant will each decide how the parts should be distributed. Each contestant in the group then votes on which distribution they think is the most ideal, which ends up being the final part distribution. The contestant whose part distribution is chosen will also be the leader.

Each coach will give scores to each individual contestant from 1 – 100 (up to a total evaluation score of 700). Each contestant's total score calculated will consist of 700 evaluation points from the coaches, 200 points from the on-site audience, and 500 points from the 2nd votes voting round. When each contestant's total scores are added together, there is a maximum of 4500 points possible to be scored per unit. The trainees will no longer be divided by the High, Mid and Low Zone from round 5 onwards, instead the top six contestants based on the combined results of Mission 1 and 2 would be ranked in the Next Zone (A.K.A Orange Zone) while those ranked 7th and below would be relegated into the Grey Zone, with those ranked the bottom three be eliminated.

Color key

Winning Team
Killing Part

Bold denotes the contestant whose part distributions were chosen and acts as the team's leader.

Concept Game mission Results
Performance			Group	Result		Contestant		
#	Artist(s)	Song(s)	Team name	Team	Individual	Name	Position	New level
1	2NE1	"I Don't Care"	Green	3483	771	Youngseo	4	5
1	2NE1	"I Don't Care"	Green	3483	649	Jihyun	1	11
1	2NE1	"I Don't Care"	Green	3483	706	Jeemin	3	7
1	2NE1	"I Don't Care"	Green	3483	815	**Minju**	2	3
1	2NE1	"I Don't Care"	Green	3483	542	Hyewon	5	Eliminated (15)
2	Oh My Girl	"The Fifth Season (SSFWL)"	Purple	3536	739	Wonhee	1	6
2	Oh My Girl	"The Fifth Season (SSFWL)"	Purple	3536	738	Moka	2	10
2	Oh My Girl	"The Fifth Season (SSFWL)"	Purple	3536	695	**Chanelle**	3	9
2	Oh My Girl	"The Fifth Season (SSFWL)"	Purple	3536	742	Himena	4	12
2	Oh My Girl	"The Fifth Season (SSFWL)"	Purple	3536	622	Seoyeon	5	Eliminated (14)
3	Red Velvet – Irene & Seulgi	"Monster"	Red	3723	812	Jiwoo	1	2
3	Red Velvet – Irene & Seulgi	"Monster"	Red	3723	777	Iroha	4	1
3	Red Velvet – Irene & Seulgi	"Monster"	Red	3723	793	**Yunah**	2	4
3	Red Velvet – Irene & Seulgi	"Monster"	Red	3723	739	Jeongeun	3	8
3	Red Velvet – Irene & Seulgi	"Monster"	Red	3723	602	Funa	5	Eliminated (13)

==== Mission 2: Black Mission ====
The second mission involves each team choosing one contestant as a representative and performing one song.

Color key

Winning Team
Killing Part

Bold denotes the contestant whose part distributions were chosen and acts as the team's leader.

Black Mission Results
Performance		Group	Result		Contestant
Artist	Song	Team name	Team	Total points	Name
Blackpink	"Shut Down"	Green	3910	7393	Youngseo
Blackpink	"Shut Down"	Purple	3770	7306	Himena
Blackpink	"Shut Down"	Red	3925	7648	Iroha

=== Round 6: Image Training ===
- Episode 9

This round tests trainees' potential with two teams competing against each other with original songs as well as performing two cover songs.

Color key

Winning Team
Killing Part

Mission Results
Performance	Group	Result		Contestant	
Song	Team name	Team	Ranking (Note: Results were only announced for the top 3 in each group.)	Name	Position
"Pride"	Pride	5158	3	Jeemin	Center
"Pride"	Pride	5158		Chanelle	Main Vocal
"Pride"	Pride	5158		Yunah	Lead Vocal
"Pride"	Pride	5158		Jihyun	Sub-Vocal 1
"Pride"	Pride	5158	1	Youngseo	Sub-Vocal 2
"Pride"	Pride	5158	2	Himena	Sub-Vocal 3
"Scrum"	Scrum	5508		Jeongeun	Center
"Scrum"	Scrum	5508	3	Wonhee	Main Vocal
"Scrum"	Scrum	5508		Jiwoo	Lead Vocal
"Scrum"	Scrum	5508		Iroha	Sub-Vocal 1
"Scrum"	Scrum	5508	1	Minju	Sub-Vocal 2
"Scrum"	Scrum	5508	1	Moka	Sub-Vocal 3

==== Mission 2: Global Kpop Mission ====
Global Song Mission Results
Performance		Group	Result		Contestant		
Artist	Song	Team name	Team	Points	Name	Position	New ranking
Ive	"Eleven"	Pride	4816		Youngseo	Center	3
Ive	"Eleven"	Pride	4816		Yunah	Main Vocal	8
Ive	"Eleven"	Pride	4816		Jihyun	Lead Vocal	Eliminated (12)
Ive	"Eleven"	Pride	4816		Jeemin	Sub-Vocal 1	6
Ive	"Eleven"	Pride	4816		Chanelle	Sub-Vocal 2	Eliminated (11)
Ive	"Eleven"	Pride	4816		Himena	Sub-Vocal 3	10
Twice	"Feel Special"	Scrum	5390		Iroha	Center	4
Twice	"Feel Special"	Scrum	5390		Jiwoo	Main Vocal	5
Twice	"Feel Special"	Scrum	5390		Moka	Lead Vocal	2
Twice	"Feel Special"	Scrum	5390		Wonhee	Sub-Vocal 1	7
Twice	"Feel Special"	Scrum	5390		Minju	Sub-Vocal 2	1
Twice	"Feel Special"	Scrum	5390		Jeongeun	Sub-Vocal 3	9

=== Round 7: Finish Line ===
Mission
Performance	Group	Contestant	
Song	Team name	Name	Position
"Aim High"	Aim High	Wonhee	Center
"Aim High"	Aim High	Yunah	Main Vocal
"Aim High"	Aim High	Jeongeun	Lead Vocal
"Aim High"	Aim High	Moka	Sub-Vocal 1
"Aim High"	Aim High	Himena	Sub-Vocal 2
"Desperate"	Desperate	Minju	Center
"Desperate"	Desperate	Jiwoo	Main Vocal
"Desperate"	Desperate	Jeemin	Lead Vocal
"Desperate"	Desperate	Youngseo	Sub-Vocal 1
"Desperate"	Desperate	Iroha	Sub-Vocal 2

==== Group mission ====
The group mission is the performance of the show's theme song. This marked the first and final time the ten finalists of the show get to perform together.

Mission
Performance song	Contestant	Position
"R.U.N" (original singer: Bae Suzy)	Minju	1
"R.U.N" (original singer: Bae Suzy)	Wonhee	2
"R.U.N" (original singer: Bae Suzy)	Moka	3
"R.U.N" (original singer: Bae Suzy)	Jeongeun	4
"R.U.N" (original singer: Bae Suzy)	Youngseo	5
"R.U.N" (original singer: Bae Suzy)	Himena	6
"R.U.N" (original singer: Bae Suzy)	Jiwoo	7
"R.U.N" (original singer: Bae Suzy)	Yunah	8
"R.U.N" (original singer: Bae Suzy)	Iroha	9
"R.U.N" (original singer: Bae Suzy)	Jeemin	10

==== Medley of Round 2 performances ====
This marked the return of all 22 contestants (consisting of the ten finalists and the twelve eliminated trainees) who performed a special medley of Round 2 performances, in their original teams from Round 2.

Medley of Round 2 performances
Performance			Group	Contestant	
#	Artist(s)	Song(s)	Unit	Name	Position
1	Enhypen	"Given-Taken"	High - B	Iroha	6
1	Enhypen	"Given-Taken"	High - B	Youngseo	5
1	Enhypen	"Given-Taken"	High - B	Ruka	8
1	Enhypen	"Given-Taken"	High - B	Iris	7
1	Enhypen	"Given-Taken"	Low - A	Jeemin	3
1	Enhypen	"Given-Taken"	Low - A	Jihyun	1
1	Enhypen	"Given-Taken"	Low - A	Jiwoo	2
1	Enhypen	"Given-Taken"	Low - A	Ena	4
2	Le Sserafim	"Fearless"	Mid - A	Minju	4
2	Le Sserafim	"Fearless"	Mid - A	Haseul	2
2	Le Sserafim	"Fearless"	Mid - A	Hyewon	1
2	Le Sserafim	"Fearless"	Mid - A	Wonhee	3
2	Le Sserafim	"Fearless"	Low - B	Moa	5
2	Le Sserafim	"Fearless"	Low - B	Funa	7
2	Le Sserafim	"Fearless"	Low - B	Yewon	6
3	NewJeans	"Attention"	High - A	Yunah	5
3	NewJeans	"Attention"	High - A	Jeongeun	7
3	NewJeans	"Attention"	High - A	Himena	6
3	NewJeans	"Attention"	High - A	Seoyeon	8
3	NewJeans	"Attention"	Mid - B	Moka	2
3	NewJeans	"Attention"	Mid - B	Chanelle	1
3	NewJeans	"Attention"	Mid - B	Yuisa	3

== Rankings ==
Final members of Illit
Eliminated in final episode
Eliminated in fifth elimination
Eliminated in fourth elimination
Eliminated in third elimination
Eliminated in second elimination
Eliminated in first elimination

Name	Ranking																
Name	Initial	Ep. 1-2	Ep. 3			Ep. 5			Ep. 6			Ep. 8		Ep. 9		Ep. 10	Final
Name	Rank	Level	Score	Rank	Level	Score	Rank	Level	Score	Rank	Level	Score	Rank	Score	Rank	Rank	Final
Wonhee (원희)	00	M	614	10	M	1129	13	L	1292	7	M	1027	6	2595	7	1	1
Youngseo (영서)	7	H	641	5	H	1374	1	H	1404	1	H	1151	5	2719	3	2	2
Minju (민주)	4	M	622	9	M	1195	11	M	1301	6	M	1230	3	2955	1	3	3
Iroha (이로하)	3	H	657	2	H	1344	3	H	1362	3	H	1291	1	2695	4	4	4
Moka (모카)	6	M	517	18	L	1123	15	L	1256	9	M	955	10	2825	2	5	5
Yunah (윤아)	2	H	631	6	H	1317	6	H	1267	8	M	1167	4	2563	8	6	6
Himena (히메나)	10	H	649	4	H	1300	8	M	1083	12	L	828	12	2132	10	Eliminated	
Jeemin (지민)	1	L	552	14	M	1206	10	M	1313	5	H	1023	7	2597	6	Eliminated	
Jeongeun (정은)	8	H	653	3	H	1304	7	M	1093	11	L	1014	8	2414	9	Eliminated	
Jiwoo (지우)	5	L	606	11	M	1223	9	M	1400	2	H	1248	2	2607	5	Eliminated	
Chanelle (샤넬)	9	M	626	7	H	1360	2	H	1153	10	M	980	9	2104	11	Eliminated	
Jihyun (지현)	14	L	573	13	M	1337	4	H	1339	4	H	869	11	1943	12	Eliminated	
Funa (후우나)	11	L	519	17	L	1025	18	L	1067	13	L	808	13	Eliminated			
Seoyeon (서연)	00	H	625	8	M	1163	12	M	902	15	L	688	14	Eliminated			
Hyewon (혜원)	13	M	676	1	H	1337	4	H	1014	14	L	650	15	Eliminated			
Moa (모아)	15	L	540	16	L	1124	14	L	901	16	L	Eliminated					
Ruka (루카)	12	H	589	12	M	1034	17	L	894	17	L	Eliminated					
Yewon (예원)	18	L	550	15	L	1069	16	L	772	18	L	Eliminated					
Ena (에나)	20	L	449	21	L	972	19	L	Eliminated								
Haseul (하슬)	17	M	440	20	L	936	20	L	Eliminated								
Iris (아이리스)	16	H	513	19	L	916	21	L	Eliminated								
Yuisa (유이사)	19	M	438	22	L	Eliminated											

== Global votes ==
=== First voting period ===
The first global voting period took place from June 23, 2023, at 12pm KST to July 5, 12am KST. Fans were able to vote for six contestants, once a day. 50% domestic and 50% global votes were converted into scores.

Color key

Top 6

1st Global Voting Announcement results
Rank	Contestant	Votes			Ranks	
Rank	Contestant	Korean	Global	Total (Note: Points were calculated using this formula: [Number of Korean Votes × (Overall Total Votes ÷ Total Korean Votes)] + [Number of International Votes × (Overall Total Votes ÷ Total International Votes)].)	Korean	Global
1	Iroha	154,735	169,696	324,431	2	1
2	Youngseo	148,626	167,686	316,312	3	2
3	Minju	169,696	127,603	297,299	1	7
4	Wonhee	147,307	143,508	290,815	5	5
5	Jiwoo	84,965	157,209	242,174	9	4
6	Jeemin	147,996	90,465	238,461	4	12
7	Jihyun	112,236	116,094	228,330	7	8
8	Yunah	112,373	113,290	225,663	6	9
9	Ruka	71,753	143,145	214,898	10	6
10	Chanelle	49,214	164,710	213,924	17	3
11	Moka	99,172	106,905	206,077	8	10
12	Moa	61,810	96,222	158,032	14	11
13	Hyewon	44,765	80,463	125,228	18	13
14	Jeongeun	58,043	64,844	122,887	15	14
15	Funa	56,210	64,576	120,786	16	15
16	Himena	70,380	33,089	103,469	11	16
17	Yewon	68,013	29,705	97,718	12	17
18	Seoyeon	62,915	22,478	85,393	13	18

=== Second voting period ===
The second global voting period took place from July 7, 2023, at 12pm KST to July 20, 12am KST. Fans were able to vote for six contestants, once a day. 50% domestic and 50% global votes were converted into scores.

Color key

Top 6

2nd Global Voting Announcement results
Rank	Contestant	Votes			Ranks	
Rank	Contestant	Korean	Global	Total	Korean	Global
1	Minju	232,846	153,356	386,202	1	4
2	Youngseo	193,340	160,525	353,865	2	3
3	Jiwoo	80,096	232,846	312,942	10	1
4	Jeemin	168,129	129,709	294,838	4	7
5	Iroha	161,754	130,865	292,619	5	6
6	Wonhee	174,229	94,109	268,338	3	9
7	Chanelle	62,061	203,365	265,426	11	2
8	Yunah	122,722	132,125	254,847	6	5
9	Jihyun	110,208	95,008	205,216	8	8
10	Moka	115,522	86,531	202,053	7	10
11	Jeongeun	104,301	58,322	162,623	9	11
12	Hyewon	48,236	52,596	100,832	15	12
13	Funa	56,369	42,820	99,189	13	13
14	Himena	61,156	19,219	80,375	12	14
15	Seoyeon	53,261	8,126	61,387	14	15

=== Third voting period ===
The third global voting period took place from July 21, 2023, at 10:30pm KST to Aug 10, 12am KST. Fans were able to vote for six contestants, once a day. 50% domestic and 50% global votes were converted into scores.

Color key

Top 6

3rd Global Voting Announcement results
Rank	Contestant	Votes			Ranks	
Rank	Contestant	Korean	Global	Total	Korean	Global
1	Youngseo	818,558	699,344	1,517,902	2	4
2	Jeemin	775,050	700,580	1,475,630	3	3
3	Minju	844,882	600,985	1,445,867	1	6
4	Jiwoo	535,011	844,882	1,379,893	7	1
5	Yunah	618,807	662,204	1,281,011	6	5
6	Chanelle	383,808	804,517	1,188,325	11	2
7	Iroha	669,902	424,272	1,094,174	5	7
8	Wonhee	730,905	274,903	1,005,808	4	10
9	Jihyun	520,488	411,882	932,370	8	8
10	Moka	467,454	327,969	795,423	9	9
11	Jeongeun	454,860	231,360	686,220	10	11
12	Himena	323,735	183,275	507,010	12	12

=== Final Live Voting ===
Color key

Top 2

Label Pick

Final Live Voting Announcement results
Rank	Contestant	Votes
1	Wonhee	3,299,395
2	Youngseo	3,065,146
3	Minju	2,961,696
4	Jeemin	2,673,879
5	Iroha	2,569,421
6	Jeongeun	2,566,936
7	Yunah	2,512,654
8	Moka	2,111,375
9	Jiwoo	1,911,489
10	Himena	1,394,729

== Discography ==
=== Singles ===
Title	Year	Peak positions	Album
Title	Year	KOR Down.	Album
"R.U.N" (전속력으로)	2023	55	R U Next? Theme Song

== Ratings ==
Average TV viewership ratings
Ep.	Original broadcast date	Average audience share
Ep.	Original broadcast date	Nielsen Korea (Nationwide)
1	June 30, 2023	0.678% (40th)
2	July 7, 2023	0.593% (40th)
3	July 14, 2023	0.418% (48th)
4	July 21, 2023	0.597% (39th)
5	July 28, 2023	0.453% (46th)
6	August 4, 2023	0.419% (48th)
7	August 11, 2023	0.39% (49th)
8	August 18, 2023	0.251% (62nd)
9	August 25, 2023	0.386% (45th)
10	September 1, 2023	0.5%
In the table above, the blue numbers represent the lowest ratings and the red numbers represent the highest ratings.; This series aired on a cable channel/pay TV which normally has a relatively smaller audience compared to free-to-air TV/public broadcasters (KBS, SBS, MBC and EBS).

== Response ==
R U Next?, during its time of broadcast, gained a large fan following from South Korea and many other countries. The final episode was viewed in 182 countries and regions, and over 23 million votes were cast globally to select six contestants to join the debut lineup. During the broadcast of the show, its official TikTok channel accumulated over 800 million views, and the show's official accounts on other social media platforms attracted more than one million followers. The final lineup, consisting of Wonhee, Youngseo, Minju, Iroha, Moka, and Yunah, received good fan reception.

Despite its popularity among fans, there were several controversies surrounding the show. Among them were the selection of the debut lineup members, because the system of choosing the six members of the debut lineup, mainly two via fan voting and four via label pick, caused some dissatisfaction among viewers who felt the fan votes were not the main factor behind choosing the members of the debut lineup, and another reason was due to the elimination of some trainees who were among the most well-liked contestants by fans, who felt they deserved a chance to debut like the six winners.

== Aftermath ==
- Five members of the final six debuted as Illit on March 25, 2024.
  - Youngseo left the group on January 5, 2024. She later joined The Black Label and debuted as a member of AllDay Project on June 23, 2025.

=== Other contestants ===
- On March 21, 2024, Jeemin was revealed as a contestant on Mnet survival show I-Land 2. She placed 2nd in the final episode, making her a member of the show's final lineup. Later, she debuted as a member of Izna on November 25, 2024.
- Chanelle and Yewon joined Attrakt and debuted as members of Fifty Fifty on September 20, 2024.
- Himena debuted as member of Japanese girl group Myera on January 1, 2025.
- Jihyun joined Blue Brown Records (founded by Wheesung) and debuted as a member of Heart of Woman in 2026.
- Moa signed on to Agnes Entertainment as a model in the summer of 2024. She later debuted in LG's promotional project group AI-DOL, which promoted LG's newest washing machine.
- In February 2026, Ruka joined Twin Planet as a model and content creator.
- In July 2026, Yuisa, Ena, and Seoyeon were revealed as three of the members of Hybe NEB x INCS's South Korean-Japanese girl group, Girls Archives.
- Hyewon joined Innit Entertainment, a subsidiary of JYP Entertainment. She debuted in the group Ourbirthday in July 2026.
