= Wonhee =

South Korean singer (born 2007)

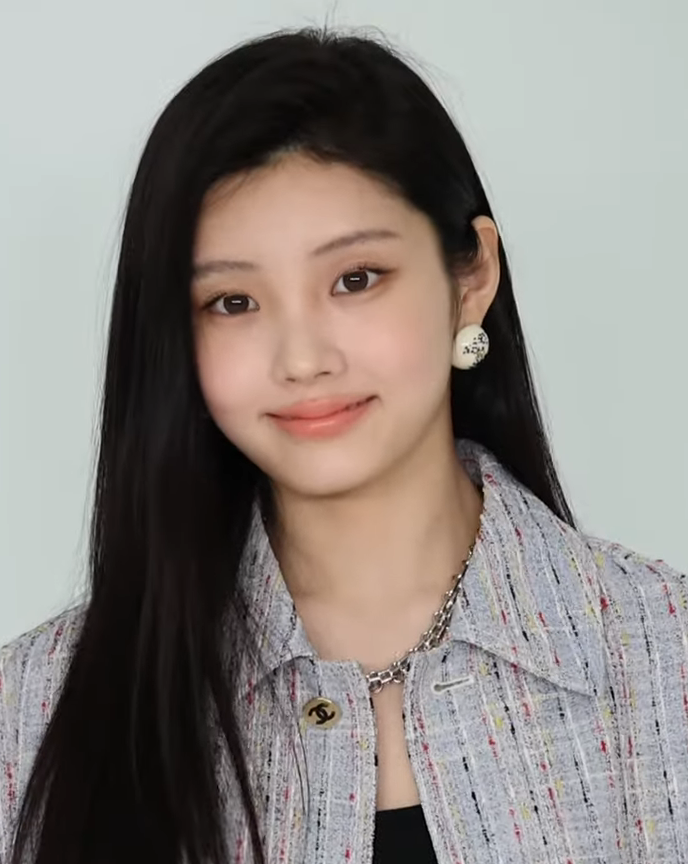
- Wonhee in 2026
- Born: Lee Won-hee; June 26, 2007 (age 19); Busan, South Korea
- Occupation: Singer
- Musical career
- Genre: K-pop
- Instrument: Vocals
- Years active: 2024–present
- Label: Belift Lab
- Member of: Illit

Korean name
- Hangul: 이원희
- RR: I Wonhui
- MR: I Wŏnhŭi

Signature
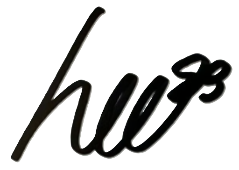

Lee Won-hee (Korean: 이원희; born June 26, 2007), known mononymously as Wonhee, is a South Korean singer. She is a member of the girl group Illit under Belift Lab and Hybe, formed through the 2023 survival show R U Next?.

== Early life ==
Lee Won-hee was born on June 26, 2007, in Busan, South Korea. Her family includes her parents and older brother. During her elementary school years, her family relocated to Changwon. She was scouted by a Hybe employee at a bus station in February 2023 while she was visiting Seoul.

== Career ==
In 2023, Wonhee participated in R U Next?, a survival show co-produced by JTBC and Belift Lab aimed at forming a new girl group. She ranked first in the finale, becoming a member of Illit. Illit debuted on March 25, 2024, with the EP Super Real Me and the lead single "Magnetic".

In May 2025, Wonhee made her solo OST debut with "The Look In Your Eyes", for the soundtrack for the drama Spring of Youth. She made a cameo appearance in the final episode of the same drama, aired on July 2, 2025. Her first solo variety show, Still Rough with Wonhee, aired in 2025. On December 31, 2025, Wonhee performed a solo cover of IU's "Good Day" at the 2025 MBC Gayo Daejejeon.

Her second solo variety show, Wonhee Is Twenty, premiered on June 6, 2026.

== Other ventures ==
=== Endorsements ===
In April 2024, Wonhee was selected as a model for the Japanese sports drink Pocari Sweat.

In February 2026, Wonhee was selected as the official brand model for the South Korean cosmetics brand Rom&nd, fronting their Glasting Color Gloss campaign. In the same month, Wonhee collaborated with the mobile phone case brand Casetify. In March, Wonhee was selected as the official brand model for the global hair treatment brand Fino. In the same month, Wonhee was announced as a model for a new marketing campaign for coffeehouse chain A Twosome Place. In May, she was selected as the model for Abib Cosmetic, a popular skincare South Korean brand. In the same month, she was selected as the model for Dong-A Pharmaceutical's acne scar treatment Noscarna Gel. In September, Wonhee was announced as the first model of Chuulens, a South Korean fashion-inspired color contact lens brand.

== Discography ==
=== Soundtrack appearances ===
| Year | Title | Drama | Ref. |
|---|---|---|---|
| 2025 | "The Look In Your Eyes" | Spring of Youth OST Part 3 | |

== Filmography ==
=== Television series ===
| Year | Title | Role | Ref. |
|---|---|---|---|
| 2025 | Spring of Youth | Cameo | |

=== Television shows ===
| Year | Title | Role | Notes | Ref. |
|---|---|---|---|---|
| 2023 | R U Next? | Contestant | Ranked 1st place | |
| 2025 | MBC Gayo Daejejeon | Performer | Solo special stage | |
