= N/a (EP) =

2024 EP by Izna

- Digital cover

EP by Izna
- Released: November 25, 2024
- Recorded: 2024
- Genre: Pop
- Length: 13:37
- Languages: Korean; English
- Label: WakeOne

Izna chronology
N/a (2024)	Not Just Pretty (2025)

Singles from N/a
- 1. "Izna" Released: November 25, 2024

N/a is the debut extended play (EP) by South Korean girl group Izna. It was released by WakeOne on November 25, 2024. It is the only album to feature their member Yoon Ji-yoon who was on hiatus and subsequently departed from the group on August 19, 2025.

== Background ==
Izna was formed through the survival show I-Land 2: N/a (2024). They planned to release their debut album, produced by Teddy Park, in the second half of the year. On October 4, 2024, the title of Izna's first EP was revealed to be N/a through their official social media channels.

== Track listing ==
N/a track listing
No.	Title	Lyrics	Music	Arrangement	Length
1.	"Izna"	Vince; VVN; Teddy Park; Danny Chung	Teddy; Vince; VVN	Dominsuk; 24; Teddy; IDO; Junior Chef; Vince; Kush	2:36
2.	"Timebomb"	Teddy Park; VVN; Vince; Malachiii; Zikai; Jesse Blumefeld	Teddy; Kush; VVN; Malachiii; Zikai; Jesse Blumefeld	IDO; Kush; Dominsuk	2:51
3.	"IWALY" (Izna version)	VVN; Teddy; Fuko	VVN; Kush; IDO	IDO; VVN	3:03
4.	"Drip"	Teddy; Vince; VVN; Theron Thomas; Tommy Brown; Amanda Ratchfold; Courtlin Jabrae Edwards	24; Teddy; Kush; Theron Thomas; Tommy Brown; Amanda Ratchfold; Courtlin Jabrae Edwards	24; Vince; Kush	2:23
5.	"Fake It"	VVN; Vince; Teddy; Danny Chung	VVN; Kush; Teddy; Danny Chung; IDO	IDO; VVN	2:45

== Charts ==
=== Weekly charts ===
Weekly chart performance for N/a
Chart (2024)	Peak position
Japanese Albums (Oricon)	17
Japanese Combined Albums (Oricon)	14
Japanese Hot Albums (Billboard Japan)	59
South Korean Albums (Circle)	3

=== Monthly charts ===
Monthly chart performance for N/a
Chart (2024)	Position
Japanese Albums (Oricon)	31
South Korean Albums (Circle)	13

== Release history ==
Release history for N/a
Region	Date	Format	Label
Various	November 25, 2024	Digital download; streaming	WakeOne
South Korea	November 25, 2024	CD	WakeOne
