= Izna =

South Korean girl group

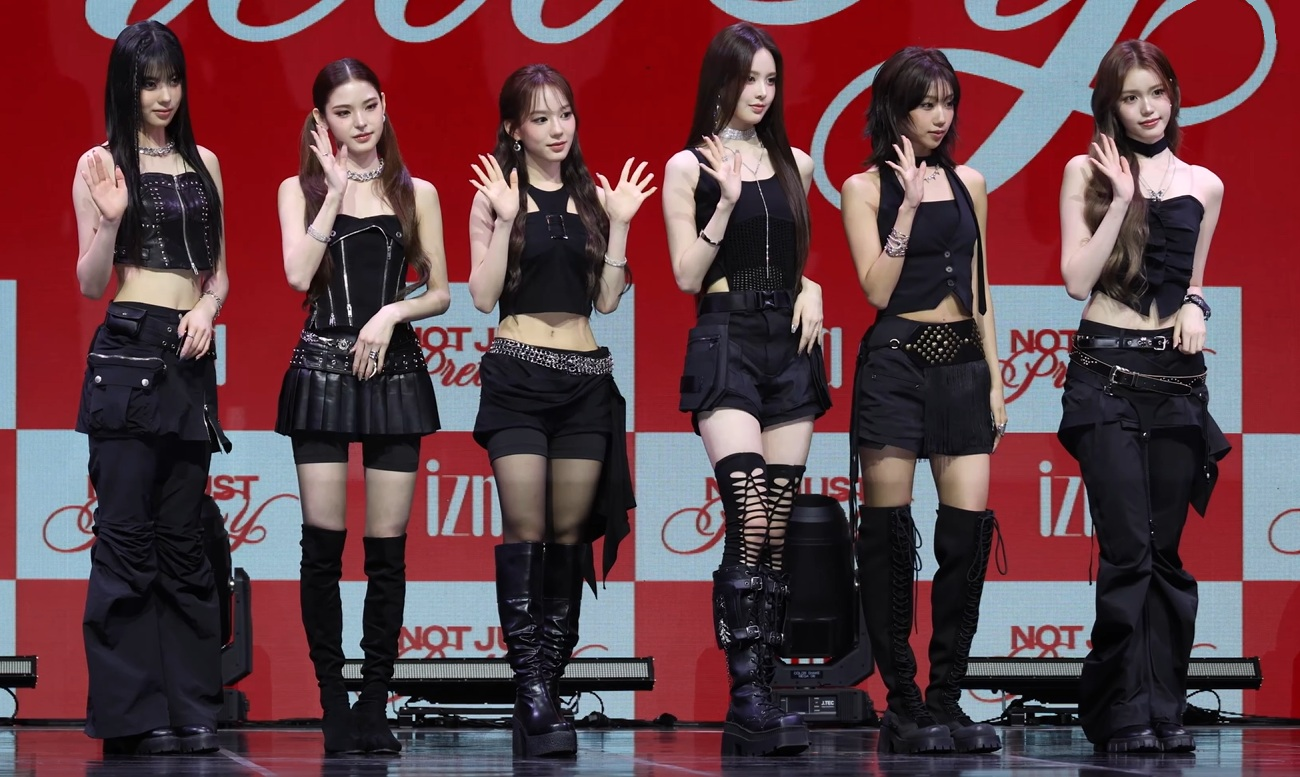
- Izna in September 2025; L–R: Koko, Mai, Ryu Sa-rang, Bang Jee-min, Choi Jung-eun, and Jeong Sae-bi

Background information
- Origin: Seoul, South Korea
- Genre: K-pop
- Years active: 2024–present
- Labels: WakeOne; Republic
- Members: Mai; Bang Jee-min; Koko; Ryu Sa-rang; Choi Jung-eun; Jeong Sae-bi
- Past members: Yoon Ji-yoon
- Website: wake-one.com/artists/izna

Izna (Korean: 이즈나; stylized in all lowercase) is a South Korean girl group under WakeOne, produced by Teddy Park, that was formed through the Mnet survival show I-Land 2: N/a. The group consists of six members: Mai, Bang Jee-min, Koko, Ryu Sa-rang, Choi Jung-eun, and Jeong Sae-bi. They debuted on November 25, 2024, with the extended play (EP) N/a. Izna was originally a seven-member group; Yoon Ji-yoon departed from the group on August 19, 2025, due to health-related reasons.

== Name ==
Izna is a name that was created from I-Land 2: N/a after finalized 'I2(N/a)'. "Anytime, anywhere, anything is me" is the meaning behind the name.

== History ==
=== Formation through I-Land 2: N/a and other activities ===
Izna was formed through Mnet's reality competition show I-Land 2, which aired from April 18 to July 4, 2024. The show brought contestants from Korea, Japan, and Malaysia, under WakeOne Entertainment, to compete and to debut in a multinational girl group, the first non-temporary girl group under WakeOne Entertainment. Out of a small pool of 24 contestants, only seven would be chosen to make the final lineup. All the members were announced in the finale episode, which was broadcast live on July 4, 2024, where they'll be active for about seven years.

Before appearing on the program, several members had already been active in the entertainment industry. In 2020, Choi Jung-eun participated in the CJ ENM survival show Cap-Teen but she was eliminated relatively quickly, in the first episode. In 2023, Bang Jee-min participated in the Belift Lab survival show R U Next but she was eliminated in the final episode, ranking 7th place, barely missing out on the chance to join Illit. Additionally, several other trainees received training under other entertainment companies. From 2018 to 2021, Bang Jee-min was a trainee under Source Music, then from 2021 to 2023, she was a Belift Lab trainee. From 2022 to 2023, Yoon Ji-yoon was a trainee under The Black Label. Lastly, Koko was a trainee under Avex Entertainment.

=== 2024–2025: Introduction, debut with Izna, Sign, Beep, Yoon Ji-yoon's departure, first fan-con, and Not Just Pretty ===
Prior to their official debut, on August 5, 2024, Izna was confirmed to be participating in KCON Germany 2024, on September 28 and 29, at Messe Frankfurt. They performed original mission songs and covers from I-Land 2, solidifying a strong presence all before debut.

In November 2024, WakeOne revealed that Izna would officially debut on November 25 with their first EP N/a, alongside its lead single "Izna". On November 22, the group showcased their debut performance during the second day of the 2024 MAMA Awards at the Kyocera Dome Osaka in Japan.

On March 17, 2025, it was announced that the group's first digital single Sign would be released on March 31. Member Yoon Ji-yoon was not involved in this release due to hiatus. "Sign" earned Izna their first music show trophy on SBS's The Show on April 15.

On May 22, it was announced that the group's first physical single album Beep would be released on June 9, without member Yoon Ji-yoon due to her ongoing hiatus. "Beep" earned its first music show trophy on SBS's The Show on June 17.

On August 19, WakeOne confirmed the departure of member Yoon Ji-yoon due to health reasons.

On August 28, it was announced that the group's second EP Not Just Pretty would be released on September 30, alongside its lead single "Mamma Mia". "Mamma Mia" earned its first music show trophy on KBS2's Music Bank on October 17.

On September 5, Wakeone announced the start of the group's first fan concert "Not Just Pretty", named after their upcoming second mini-album, with stops in Seoul and Tokyo in November and January.

=== 2026–present: Love All, Set The Tempo, "Who Dat Girl?" and Handle With Care ===
On March 8, 2026, it was announced that the group's first Japanese digital single Love All would be released on March 16.

On May 18, it was announced that the group's third EP Set The Tempo would be released on June 8, alongside its lead single "Metronome". The EP features 5 tracks, with members Jeemin and Sarang credited as lyricists on "Infinity".

On July 9, it was announced that the group's debut Japanese mini album Handle With Care would be released on September 2, alongside its lead single "Dumb Hot!". The group held a showcase to celebrate their Japanese debut and the mini album's release on September 6 at KT Zepp Yokohama.

On July 10, Wakeone announced the start of the group's first concert tour "Who Dat Girl?", with stops in Seoul, Taipei, Manila, Hong Kong, Singapore, and Kuala Lumpur from September to December. On September 6, at their Japanese debut showcase, they announced Japan dates for the tour, with stops in Fukuoka, Tokyo, Nagoya, and Osaka in March 2027.

== Endorsements ==
In July 2024, Izna were announced as models for skincare brand HK Inno.N.

== Members ==
Current

- Mai (마이)
- Bang Jee-min (방지민)
- Koko (코코)
- Ryu Sa-rang (유사랑)
- Choi Jung-eun (최정은)
- Jeong Sae-bi (정세비)

Former

- Yoon Ji-yoon (윤지윤)

Timeline

== Discography ==
=== Extended plays ===
List of extended plays
Title	Details	Peak chart positions			Sales
Title	Details	KOR	JPN	JPN Hot	Sales
Korean
N/a	Released: November 25, 2024; Label: WakeOne; Formats: CD, digital download, streaming; Track listing: 1. "Izna"; 2. "Timebomb"; 3. "IWALY" (Izna version); 4. "Drip"; 5. "Fake It"	3	17	59	KOR: 266,071; JPN: 14,354
Not Just Pretty	Released: September 30, 2025; Label: WakeOne; Formats: CD, digital download, streaming; Track listing: 1. "Supercrush"; 2. "Mamma Mia"; 3. "Racecar"; 4. "In the Rain" (빗속에서); 5. "Sign" (Remix)	2	17	— (Note: Not Just Pretty did not enter Billboard Japan Hot Albums chart, but peaked at number 30 on the Download Albums chart.)	KOR: 218,456; JPN: 10,746
Set the Tempo	Released: June 8, 2026; Label: WakeOne; Formats: CD, digital download, streaming; Track listing: 1. "Metronome"; 2. "R.I.P."; 3. "Infinity"; 4. "Rock, Paper, Scissors"; 5. "Lean On Me"	4	12	— (Note: Set the Tempo did not enter Billboard Japan Hot Albums chart, but peaked at number 30 on the Download Albums chart.)	KOR: 114,051; JPN: 7,010
Japanese
Handle with Care	Released: September 2, 2026; Label: WakeOne; Formats: CD, digital download, streaming; Track listing: 1. "Dumb Hot!"; 2. "Headache"; 3. "Izna" (Japanese ver.); 4. "Sign" (Japanese ver.); 5. "Mamma Mia" (Japanese ver.)	—	4	23	JPN: 19,031
"—" denotes a recording that did not chart.

=== Singles ===
==== Korean singles ====
List of Korean singles, showing year released, selected chart positions, and name of the album
Title	Year	Peak chart positions		Album
Title	Year	KOR	JPN Heat.	Album
"Izna"	2024	— (Note: "Izna" did not enter Circle Digital Chart, but peaked at number 19 on the Download Chart.)	—	N/a
"Sign"	2025	86	7	Non-album singles
"Beep"	2025	105	—	Non-album singles
"Mamma Mia"	2025	90	—	Not Just Pretty
"Metronome"	2026	— (Note: "Metronome" did not enter Circle Digital Chart, but peaked at number 17 on the Download Chart.)	—	Set the Tempo
"—" denotes a recording that did not chart.

==== Japanese singles ====
List of Japanese singles, showing year released, and name of the album
Title	Year	Album
"Love All"	2026	Non-album single
"Dumb Hot!"	2026	Handle With Care

=== Soundtrack appearances ===
List of soundtrack appearances
Title	Year	Peak chart positions	Album
Title	Year	KOR DL	Album
"Sass" (produced by THE HUB)	2025	—	World of Street Woman Fighter (WSWF) Original Vol.1
"Psycho"	2025	98	Operation: True Love OST
"—" denotes a recording that did not chart.

=== Other charted songs ===
List of other charted songs
Title	Year	Peak chart positions	Album
Title	Year	KOR DL	Album
"Timebomb"	2024	45	N/a
"IWALY - Izna Version"	2024	48	N/a
"Drip"	2024	49	N/a
"Fake It"	2024	46	N/a
"Beep - Japan Edition"	2025	72	Non-album single
"Supercrush"	2025	54	Not Just Pretty
"Racecar"	2025	47	Not Just Pretty
"In the Rain" (빗속에서)	2025	65	Not Just Pretty
"Sign (Remix)"	2025	72	Not Just Pretty
"R.I.P."	2026	43	Set the Tempo
"Infinity"	2026	47	Set the Tempo
"Rock, Paper, Scissors"	2026	52	Set the Tempo
"Lean On Me"	2026	45	Set the Tempo

== Videography ==
=== Music videos ===
Title	Year	Director	Ref.
"Izna"	2024	Paranoid Paradigm (VM Project Architecture)	
"Sign"	2025	725 (SL8 Visual Lab)	
"Beep"	2025	725 (SL8 Visual Lab)	
"Mamma Mia"	2025	Yuann	
"Metronome"	2026	Lee Hangyeol (Hanbago)	

=== Other videos ===
Title	Year	Director	Notes	Ref.
"Sign"	2025	AEROC	Performance video	
"Sass x Racecar"	2026	—	Special performance video	
"Metronome"	2026	YVNG WING (IDIOTS)	Performance visualizer	

== Live performances ==
=== Concerts and tours ===
Date	City	Country	Venue	Performed song(s)	Ref.
2025 izna 1st Fan-Con <Not Just Pretty>
November 8, 2025	Seoul	South Korea	BlueSquare SOL Travel Hall	"Mamma Mia"; "Sass"; "Izna"; "Racecar"; "In The Rain"; "Sign"; "Timebomb"; "Beep"; "Blue Jeans" (Hana cover) (Note: "Beep" (Japan Edition) and their "Blue Jeans" cover were only performed at the Tokyo stops.); "Fake It"; "Supercrush"; "Drip"; "IWALY"	
November 9, 2025	Seoul	South Korea	BlueSquare SOL Travel Hall	"Mamma Mia"; "Sass"; "Izna"; "Racecar"; "In The Rain"; "Sign"; "Timebomb"; "Beep"; "Blue Jeans" (Hana cover); "Fake It"; "Supercrush"; "Drip"; "IWALY"	
January 28, 2026	Tokyo	Japan	Tachikawa Stage Garden	"Mamma Mia"; "Sass"; "Izna"; "Racecar"; "In The Rain"; "Sign"; "Timebomb"; "Beep"; "Blue Jeans" (Hana cover); "Fake It"; "Supercrush"; "Drip"; "IWALY"	
January 29, 2026	Tokyo	Japan	Tachikawa Stage Garden	"Mamma Mia"; "Sass"; "Izna"; "Racecar"; "In The Rain"; "Sign"; "Timebomb"; "Beep"; "Blue Jeans" (Hana cover); "Fake It"; "Supercrush"; "Drip"; "IWALY"	
2026–2027 izna Concert Tour: Who Dat Girl?
September 19, 2026	Seoul	South Korea	Olympic Park Olympic Hall	"Izna"; "Mamma Mia"; "Fake It"; "R.I.P"; "Sass"; "Rock, Paper, Scissors"; "Beep"; "Drip"; "In The Rain"; "Infinity"; "Kissing You" (Girls' Generation cover) (Note: Mai, Ryu Sa-rang, Jeong Sae-bi); "Illusion" (Aespa cover) (Note: Bang Jee-min, Koko, Choi Jung-eun); "Supercrush"; "Racecar"; "Sign"; "Sign (Remix)"; "Metronome"; "Timebomb" (Note: "Timebomb" was not performed at the first stop in Seoul.); "IWALY"	
September 20, 2026	Seoul	South Korea	Olympic Park Olympic Hall	"Izna"; "Mamma Mia"; "Fake It"; "R.I.P"; "Sass"; "Rock, Paper, Scissors"; "Beep"; "Drip"; "In The Rain"; "Infinity"; "Kissing You" (Girls' Generation cover); "Illusion" (Aespa cover); "Supercrush"; "Racecar"; "Sign"; "Sign (Remix)"; "Metronome"; "Timebomb"; "IWALY"	
October 9, 2026	Taipei	Taiwan	Zepp New Taipei	"Izna"; "Mamma Mia"; "Fake It"; "R.I.P"; "Sass"; "Rock, Paper, Scissors"; "Beep"; "Drip"; "In The Rain"; "Infinity"; "Kissing You" (Girls' Generation cover); "Illusion" (Aespa cover); "Supercrush"; "Racecar"; "Sign"; "Sign (Remix)"; "Metronome"; "Timebomb"; "IWALY"	
October 17, 2026	Manila	Philippines	EVM Convention Center	"Izna"; "Mamma Mia"; "Fake It"; "R.I.P"; "Sass"; "Rock, Paper, Scissors"; "Beep"; "Drip"; "In The Rain"; "Infinity"; "Kissing You" (Girls' Generation cover); "Illusion" (Aespa cover); "Supercrush"; "Racecar"; "Sign"; "Sign (Remix)"; "Metronome"; "Timebomb"; "IWALY"	
October 24, 2026	Hong Kong		Macpherson Stadium	"Izna"; "Mamma Mia"; "Fake It"; "R.I.P"; "Sass"; "Rock, Paper, Scissors"; "Beep"; "Drip"; "In The Rain"; "Infinity"; "Kissing You" (Girls' Generation cover); "Illusion" (Aespa cover); "Supercrush"; "Racecar"; "Sign"; "Sign (Remix)"; "Metronome"; "Timebomb"; "IWALY"	
November 8, 2026	Singapore		Capitol Theatre	"Izna"; "Mamma Mia"; "Fake It"; "R.I.P"; "Sass"; "Rock, Paper, Scissors"; "Beep"; "Drip"; "In The Rain"; "Infinity"; "Kissing You" (Girls' Generation cover); "Illusion" (Aespa cover); "Supercrush"; "Racecar"; "Sign"; "Sign (Remix)"; "Metronome"; "Timebomb"; "IWALY"	
December 5, 2026	Kuala Lumpur	Malaysia	Zepp Kuala Lumpur		
March 12, 2027	Fukuoka	Japan	Zepp Fukuoka		
March 14, 2027	Tokyo	Japan	Zepp Haneda		
March 27, 2027	Nagoya	Japan	Zepp Nagoya		
March 29, 2027	Osaka	Japan	Zepp Namba		

=== Music festivals ===
Event	Date	Location (Note: Venue, City, Country)	Performed song(s)	Ref.
KCON Germany 2024	September 28-29, 2024	Messe Frankfurt, Frankfurt, Germany	"IWALY"; "Fake It"; "Lovesick Girls" (Blackpink cover); "Drip"	
2024 SBS Gayo Daejeon Winter	December 25, 2024	Inspire Arena, Incheon, South Korea	"Izna" (Christmas ver.)	
2024 MBC Gayo Daejejeon	January 29, 2025	MBC Dream Center, Goyang, South Korea	"Izna"	
KCON Japan 2025	May 10-11, 2025	Makuhari Messe, Chiba, Japan	"Signal" (Twice cover); "Sign"; "Izna"; "Timebomb"; "In Bloom" (Zerobaseone cover); "IWALY"	
Show! Music Core in Japan 2025	July 5, 2025	Belluna Dome, Saitama, Japan	"Beep"; "Sign"; "Forever Young" (Blackpink cover)	
2025 SBS Gayo Daejeon Summer	July 26, 2025	KINTEX, Goyang, South Korea	"Genie" (Girls' Generation cover); "Beep" (Summer ver.)	
KCON LA 2025	August 1-3, 2025	Crypto.com Arena, Los Angeles United States	"Golden" (Huntrix cover); "Beep"; "Izna"; "Sass"; "Sign"; "IWALY"; "Timebomb"; "Fiesta" (Iz*One cover)	
Summer Sonic 2025	August 16, 2025	Makuhari Messe, Chiba/Sakura no Nagare, Osaka, Japan	"Timebomb"; "Beep" (Japan Edition); "Izna"; "Drip"; "Sass"; "Sign"; "IWALY"	
Music Bank in Lisbon 2025	September 27, 2025	MEO Arena, Lisbon, Portugal	"Mamma Mia"; "Sign"; "Izna"; "Beep"; "What Is Love?" (Twice cover)	
MBC Virtual Live Festival 2025	October 18, 2025	Sangam Culture Plaza, Seoul, South Korea	"Mamma Mia"; "Sign"	
Music Bank Global Festival 2025	December 14, 2025	Tokyo National Stadium, Tokyo, Japan	"Mamma Mia"; "Racecar"; "Sign"; "Pretty Girl" (Kara cover)	
2025 SBS Gayo Daejeon Winter	December 25, 2025	Inspire Arena, Incheon, South Korea	"Mamma Mia"	
2025 MBC Gayo Daejejeon	December 31, 2025	MBC Dream Center, Goyang, South Korea	"Sign"; "Racecar"; "Rum Pum Pum Pum" (f(x) cover) (Note: Bang Jee-min)	
KCON Japan 2026	May 8 & 10, 2026	Makuhari Messe, Chiba, Japan	"ExtraL" (Jennie cover, (Note: Koko and Choi Jung-eun) with Kiss of Life (Note: Natty and Haneul) and Hiipe Princess (Note: Yuju)); "Mamma Mia"; "Sign"; "If I Say I Love You" (BoyNextDoor cover); "Izna"; "Beep"; "Sass + Racecar Remix Ver".; "Blue Jeans" (Hana cover); "Fake It"; "IWALY"	
MyK Festa 2026	June 27, 2026	KINTEX, Goyang, South Korea	"Metronome"; "R.I.P."; "Mamma Mia"; "Sign"	
2026 SBS Gayo Daejeon Summer	August 9, 2026	KINTEX, Goyang, South Korea	"Metronome"; "Level Up" (Ciara cover, with Kiss of Life (Note: Natty and Julie)); "As If It's Your Last" (Blackpink cover, with Meovv (Note: Anna and Ella) and Hearts2Hearts (Note: Stella and Ian))	
KCON LA 2026	August 15, 2026	Crypto.com Arena, Los Angeles, United States	"Mamma Mia"; "Sass"; "Sign"; "Drip"; "Racecar"; "R.I.P"; "Intro"; "Metronome"; "Ddu-Du-Ddu-Du" (Blackpink cover)	
SBI Music Circus Hokkaido	September 26, 2026	Daiwa House Premist Dome, Hokkaido, Japan	"Izna" (Japanese Ver.); "Dumb Hot!"; "Beep (Japan Edition); "Headache"; "Sign" (Japanese Ver.); "Mamma Mia" (Japanese Ver.)	
NOL Festival 2026	October 18, 2026	KINTEX, Goyang, South Korea	"Metronome"; "R.I.P"; "Drip"; "Sign"; "Mamma Mia"; "Izna"	
SBS Gayo Daejeon 30th Anniversary	December 24, 2026	KINTEX, Goyang, South Korea	TBA	

=== Awards shows ===
Event	Date	Venue	Performed song(s)	Ref.
2024 MAMA Awards	November 22, 2024	Kyocera Dome, Osaka, Japan	Intro: "Final Love Song" / "IWALY" / "Drip" / "Fake It"; "Izna"; "Timebomb"	
39th Golden Disc Awards	January 5, 2025	Mizuho PayPay Dome, Fukuoka, Japan	"Intro"; "Izna"	
2025 MAMA Awards	November 29, 2025	Kai Tak Stadium, Hong Kong, China	"Racecar"; "Izna"; "Mamma Mia" (MAMA ver.)	
40th Golden Disc Awards	January 10, 2026	Taipei Dome, Taipei, Taiwan	"Be My Baby" (Wonder Girls cover); "Mamma Mia"; "Fake It"	
2nd D Awards	February 11, 2026	Korea University, Seoul, South Korea	"Mamma Mia"; "Sign"	
35th Seoul Music Awards	June 20, 2026	Inspire Arena, Incheon, South Korea	"Mamma Mia"; "Metronome"; "Diva" (After School cover)	
2026 MAMA Awards	November 21, 2026	Kyocera Dome, Osaka, Japan	"The Boys" (Girls' Generation cover); "La Vie en Rose" (Iz*One cover (Note: with KiiiKiii)); "404 (New Era)" (MAMA Ver, KiiiKiii cover); "Metronome" (MAMA Ver); "Suddenly" (I.O.I cover (Note: with KiiiKiii and I.O.I (Note: Lim Na-young, Choi Yoo-jung, Jeon So-mi)))	

== Filmography ==
=== Television shows ===
Year	Title	Notes	Ref.
2024	I-Land 2: N/a	Reality competition show determining Izna's members	

== Awards and nominations ==
Name of the award ceremony, year presented, category, nominee of the award, and the result of the nomination
Award ceremony	Year	Category	Nominee / Work	Result	Ref.
D Awards	2026	Best Group	Izna	Won	
D Awards	2026	Best Song	Izna	Won	
D Awards	2026	Delights Blue Label	Izna	Won	
D Awards	2026	Best Rising Star	Izna	Won	
Golden Disc Awards	2026	Best Performance Award	Izna	Won	
Golden Disc Awards	2026	Rookie Artist of the Year	Izna	Nominated	
Golden Disc Awards	2026	Most Popular Artist – Female	Izna	Nominated	
Hanteo Music Awards	2024	Rookie of the Year – Female	Izna	Nominated	
Hanteo Music Awards	2024	Global Artist – Africa	Izna	Nominated	
Hanteo Music Awards	2024	Global Artist – Asia	Izna	Nominated	
Hanteo Music Awards	2024	Global Artist – Europe	Izna	Nominated	
Hanteo Music Awards	2024	Global Artist – North America	Izna	Nominated	
Hanteo Music Awards	2024	Global Artist – Oceania	Izna	Nominated	
Hanteo Music Awards	2024	Global Artist – South America	Izna	Nominated	
Hanteo Music Awards	2024	WhosFandom Award – Female	Izna	Nominated	
MAMA Awards	2025	Favorite Rising Artist	Izna	Won	
Seoul Music Awards	2025	Rookie of the Year	Izna	Nominated	
Seoul Music Awards	2025	Popularity Award	Izna	Nominated	
Seoul Music Awards	2025	K-Wave Special Award	Izna	Nominated	
Seoul Music Awards	2025	K-pop World Choice – Group	Izna	Nominated	
Seoul Music Awards	2026	Best Performance Award	Izna	Won	
