= Andy Grammer discography =

Discography of American singer-songwriter

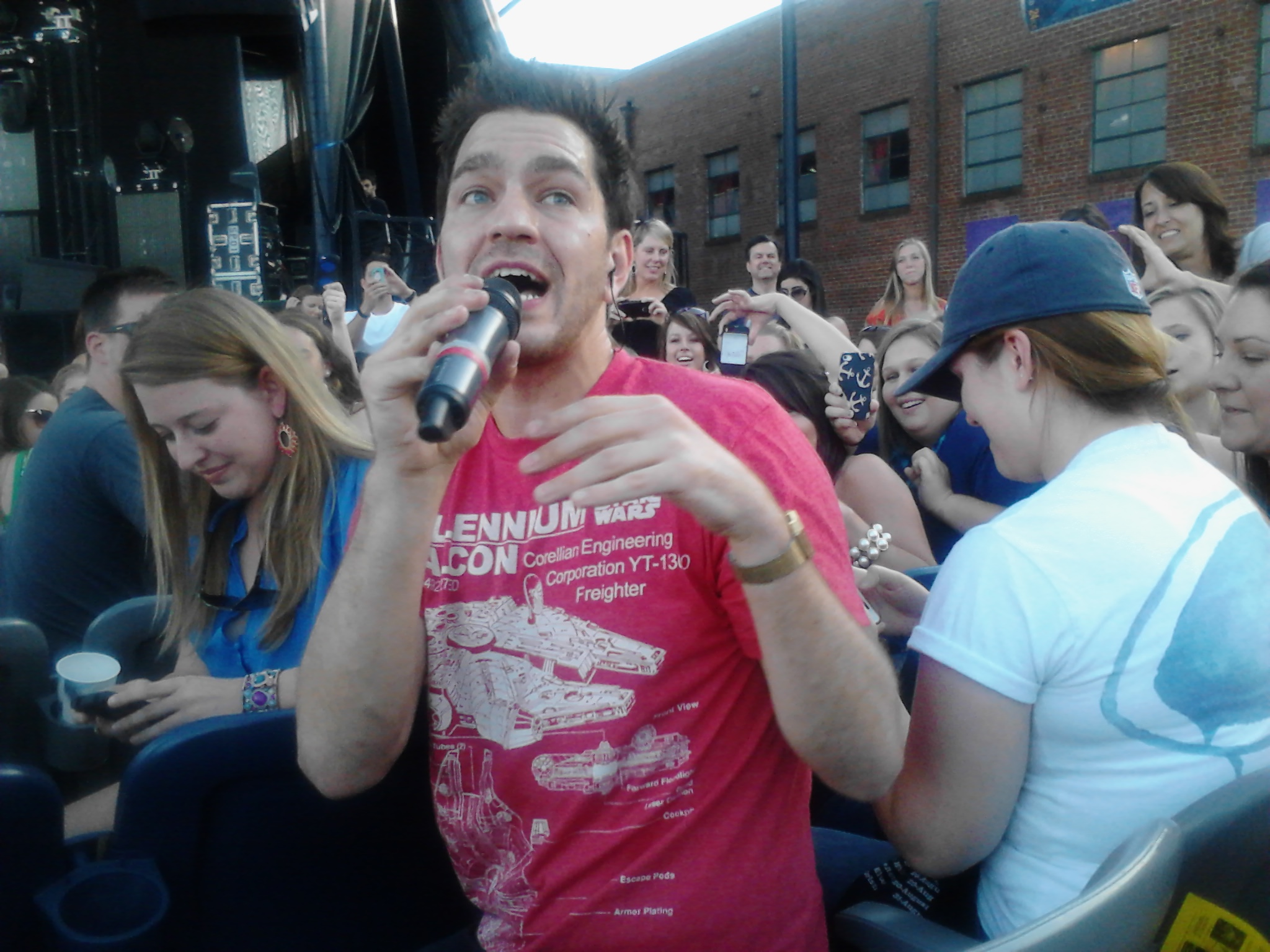
- Grammer performing in Charlotte, North Carolina, June 2012
- Studio albums: 5
- EPs: 6
- Singles: 35
- Promotional singles: 2

The discography of American singer-songwriter Andy Grammer consists of five studio albums, six extended plays, 35 singles, and two promotional singles.

== Studio albums ==
List of studio albums, with selected details, peak chart positions, sales, and certifications shown
Title	Details	Peak chart position		Sales	Certifications
Title	Details	US	US Heat	Sales	Certifications
Andy Grammer	Release date: June 14, 2011; Label: S-Curve; Formats: CD, digital download	105	1		
Magazines or Novels	Release date: August 5, 2014; Label: S-Curve; Formats: CD, digital download	19	—	US: 103,000	RIAA: Gold
The Good Parts	Release date: December 1, 2017; Label: S-Curve; Formats: CD, digital download	57	—		
Naive	Release date: July 26, 2019; Label: S-Curve; Formats: CD, digital download	29	—		
Monster	Release date: October 4, 2024; Label: Giant Soul/S-Curve; Formats: CD, digital download	—	—		
"—" denotes releases that did not chart or were not released in that territory.

== Extended plays ==
List of extended plays, with selected details shown
Title	Details
The World Is Yours	Release date: September 29, 2007; Label: None; Formats: CD, digital download
Soft Lights on Bright Colors	Release date: April 11, 2009; Label: None; Formats: CD, digital download
Live from L.A.	Release date: March 13, 2012; Label: S-Curve; Format: Digital download
Crazy Beautiful	Release date: May 21, 2013; Label: S-Curve; Format: Digital download
Spotify Singles	Release date: March 1, 2017; Label: S-Curve; Format: Streaming
The Art of Joy	Release date: June 3, 2022; Label: UMG Recordings; Formats: Streaming
The Friends & Family Sessions	Release date: April 25, 2025; Label: Giant Soul/S-Curve; Formats: Digital download, streaming

== Singles ==
List of singles, with year released, peak chart positions, certifications, and album name shown
Title	Year	Peak chart positions										Certifications	Album
Title	Year	US	US Adult	AUS	BEL (Fl)	CAN	FRA	NLD	NZ	SWE	UK	Certifications	Album
"Keep Your Head Up" (solo or featuring Mélissa Nkonda)	2011	53	5	53	27	61	156	94	34	—	—	RIAA: Platinum; ARIA: 2× Platinum; RMNZ: 2× Platinum	Andy Grammer
"Fine by Me"	2011	84	10	—	47	—	—	94	—	—	—	RIAA: Platinum; RMNZ: Gold	Andy Grammer
"Miss Me"	2012	—	15	—	— (Note: "Miss Me" did not enter the Ultratop 50, but peaked at number 35 on the Ultratip chart.)	—	—	—	—	—	—		Andy Grammer
"Crazy Beautiful"	2013	—	—	—	—	—	—	—	—	—	—		Crazy Beautiful
"Back Home"	2014	—	21	27	17	—	—	—	—	—	—	ARIA: Gold	Magazines or Novels
"Honey, I'm Good"	2014	9	1	64	—	4	175	100	—	72	65	RIAA: 5× Platinum; ARIA: 2× Platinum; BPI: Silver; GLF: Gold; MC: 5× Platinum; RMNZ: 2× Platinum	Magazines or Novels
"Good to Be Alive (Hallelujah)"	2015	62	12	—	—	—	—	—	—	—	—	RIAA: Gold; MC: Gold	Magazines or Novels
"Fresh Eyes"	2016	59	9	5	— (Note: "Fresh Eyes" did not enter the Ultratop 50, but peaked at number 24 on the Ultratip chart.)	59	—	42	8	33	50	RIAA: 2× Platinum; ARIA: 5× Platinum; BPI: Gold; MC: Platinum; RMNZ: 4× Platinum	The Good Parts
"Give Love" (featuring LunchMoney Lewis)	2017	—	13	—	—	—	—	—	—	—	—		The Good Parts
"Smoke Clears"	2017	—	13	—	—	—	—	—	—	—	—		The Good Parts
"Don't Give Up on Me" (solo or with R3hab)	2019	— (Note: "Don't Give Up on Me" did not enter the Billboard Hot 100, but peaked at number one on the Bubbling Under Hot 100 chart.)	12	49	—	87	—	—	— (Note: "Don't Give Up on Me" did not enter the NZ Top 40 Singles Chart, but peaked at number 37 on the NZ Hot Singles Chart.)	—	—	RIAA: 2× Platinum; ARIA: 3× Platinum; BPI: Platinum; GLF: Gold; RMNZ: 2× Platinum; SNEP: Gold	Naive
"I Am Yours"	2019	—	—	—	—	—	—	—	—	—	—		Naive
"Some Girl"	2019	—	—	—	—	—	—	—	—	—	—		Naive
"Wish You Pain"	2019	—	27	—	—	—	—	—	—	—	—		Naive
"Best of You" (solo or with Elle King)	2020	—	—	—	—	—	—	—	—	—	—		Naive
"I Found You" (with Cash Cash)	2020	—	—	—	—	—	—	—	—	—	—	ARIA: Gold; RMNZ: Gold	Naive
"Good Example" (with R3hab)	2020	—	—	—	—	—	—	—	—	—	—		Non-album single
"Thousand Faces" (with Don Diablo)	2020	—	—	—	—	—	—	—	—	—	—		Forever
"Close to You" (with R3hab)	2021	—	—	—	—	—	—	—	—	—	—		Non-album single
"Lease on Life"	2021	—	—	—	—	—	—	—	—	—	—		The Art of Joy and Monster (Deluxe)
"Damn It Feels Good to Be Me"	2021	—	14	—	—	—	—	—	—	—	—		The Art of Joy and Monster (Deluxe)
"Love Myself"	2021	—	—	—	—	—	—	—	—	—	—		The Art of Joy and Monster (Deluxe)
"Joy"	2022	—	—	—	—	—	—	—	—	—	—		The Art of Joy and Monster (Deluxe)
"Saved My Life (with R3hab)	2022	—	13	—	—	—	—	—	—	—	—		The Art of Joy and Monster (Deluxe)
"Good Man (First Love)"	2022	—	—	—	—	—	—	—	—	—	—		Monster (Deluxe)
"The Wrong Party" (with Fitz and the Tantrums)	2022	—	—	—	—	—	—	—	—	—	—		Monster (Deluxe)
"Good in Me"	2022	—	—	—	—	—	—	—	—	—	—		Monster (Deluxe)
"Good Company"	2022	—	—	—	—	—	—	—	—	—	—		Monster (Deluxe)
"These Tears"	2023	—	—	—	—	—	—	—	—	—	—		Monster (Deluxe)
"I Need a New Money"	2023	—	—	—	—	—	—	—	—	—	—		Monster (Deluxe)
"Love Is the New Money"	2023	—	37	—	—	—	—	—	—	—	—		Monster (Deluxe)
"Expensive" (with Pentatonix)	2023	—	—	—	—	—	—	—	—	—	—		Monster (Deluxe)
"Without You"	2024	—	—	—	—	—	—	—	—	—	—		Monster
"I Do" (with Maddie & Tae)	2024	—	—	—	—	—	—	—	—	—	—		Monster
"Magic"	2024	—	—	—	—	—	—	—	—	—	—		Monster
"The Thing I Love" (with Max)	2025	—	21	—	6	—	—	— (Note: "The Thing I Love" did not enter the Dutch Single Top 100, but peaked at number 28 on the Dutch Single Tip chart.)	—	—	—		Non-album single
"Best Hearts"	2026	—	—	—	—	—	—	—	—	—	—		Big Stupid Heart
"All I Want Is You"	2026	—	—	—	—	—	—	—	—	—	—		Big Stupid Heart
"—" denotes releases that did not chart or were not released in that territory.

=== Promotional singles ===
List of promotional singles, with year released and album name shown
Title	Year	Album
"My Own Hero"	2019	Naive
"I Found You"	2019	Naive
