= Five Feet Apart (soundtrack) =

Five Feet Apart (Original Motion Picture Soundtrack)

Film score by Brian Tyler and Breton Vivian
- Released: March 15, 2019
- Genre: Film score
- Length: 60:28
- Label: Lakeshore Records
- Producer: Brian Tyler; Breton Vivian

Brian Tyler chronology
What Men Want (2019)	Five Feet Apart (2019)	Swamp Thing (2019)

Breton Vivian chronology
3,000 Miles (2019)	Five Feet Apart (2019)	Our Last Normal Conversation (2019)

Five Feet Apart (Original Motion Picture Soundtrack) is the film score for the 2019 film Five Feet Apart directed by Justin Baldoni, starring Cole Sprouse and Haley Lu Richardson. The film score is composed by Brian Tyler and Breton Vivian and released through Lakeshore Records on March 15, 2019.

== Development ==
In October 2018, it was reported that Brian Tyler and Breton Vivian would compose the score for Five Feet Apart. Vivian assisted Tyler over a year, and had written additional music for the Paramount Network television series Yellowstone. Having liked his work for that series, Vivian was allowed to co-compose music for the film. Vivian added that he and Tyler wanted to musically highlight the imperfections of life and allowing the score to be grounded in realism. As a result, they manipulated the music and audio to create flaws. Firstly, they recorded the music through cheap lo-fi samplers and intentionally left the sounds to be hissed and over-saturated. The score was further sent through guitar pedals in order to warble the pitch or create endless noise loops and ambient sound beds. According to Vivian, this approach made him really inspirational helping to build on the creativity and making the writing process as more fluid.

== Release ==
The original score was released under Lakeshore Records on March 15, 2019, the same date as the film. The album further includes a deluxe edition, that has only one song "My Baby Just Cares for Me" performed by Kate Davis. Though not included in the soundtrack, Andy Grammer wrote and performed the song "Don't Give Up on Me" which was released on February 13, to promote the film and his subsequent studio album Naive (2019). A remix of the song is produced by Dutch DJ R3hab.

== Track listing ==
No.	Title	Length
1.	"Five Feet Apart"	2:53
2.	"Hello World"	1:51
3.	"I Know"	2:53
4.	"Falling Further"	2:47
5.	"Love Blooms"	3:30
6.	"Hide and Seek"	3:25
7.	"On My Watch"	3:32
8.	"Stella"	1:36
9.	"Connection"	0:59
10.	"Where Are They?"	2:19
11.	"Human Touch"	2:52
12.	"Bigger Than Us"	2:25
13.	"Rooftop Perspective"	2:02
14.	"Code Blue"	5:18
15.	"Not Your Fault"	2:24
16.	"Snow Angel"	2:10
17.	"Will and Stella"	2:37
18.	"Life"	3:57
19.	"The Lights"	3:03
20.	"Breathe"	5:20
21.	"My Baby Just Cares for Me" (Kate Davis)	2:35
Total length:		60:28

== Reception ==
Leo Mayr of Film.Music.Media wrote "Five Feet Apart is fantastic effort from Brian Tyler and Breton Vivian. The score wonderfully ties the story together and does a great deal at making you relate to the characters and their struggles. The duo manages to always supply the right emotions while keeping a consistent style throughout the score. The music never feels as big as you’d expect from Tyler, yet the emphasis of few instruments over a large orchestra really makes the score something wonderfully unique." Andrew Barker of Variety and Caryn James of The Hollywood Reporter called the score to be "moving" and "tender". Hannah Rachel Abraham of The Week wrote "The score by Brian Taylor (who scored the Avengers) and Breton Vivian is classic YA fare, complete with pop montages and blaringly obvious audio cues dictating emotion."

Amanda Prahl of PopSugar wrote "From the original score by composers Brian Tyler and Breton Vivian to new tracks by pop stars like Andy Grammer, Selena Gomez, and Kygo, the album is a roller coaster of emotions, just like the movie itself." Jwala Vijay of Medium wrote "the background score by Brian Tyler and Breton Vivian is a thing of delight and perfection and is layered into the fabric of the film so beautifully, that it melts your heart. While you watch the movie it seamlessly glides into the scenes and it is only after we hear the music, we understand the singular impact of the instrumental scores. It is undoubtedly one of the best."

== Additional music ==
The list of songs featured in the film, but not in the soundtrack:

- "Don't Give Up on Me" by Andy Grammer
- "Fascination" by the Beaches
- "The District Sleeps Alone Tonight" by Birdy
- "Roadblock (Six Weeks)" by Atta Boy
- "Bandolera" by Fragancia and Franky Monroy
- "& On & On & On" by Born Ruffians
- "Love the Night" by Bazil
- "To Let Go" by Cozy
- "State Lines" by Novo Amor
- "Wait" by M83
- "Pluto" by Sleeping at Last
- "Shallows" by Daughter
- "Aftermath" by Caravan Palace
- "Medicine" by Daughter
- "Anchor" by Novo Amor
- "Remind Me to Forget" by Kygo feat. Miguel
- "Nobody" by Selena Gomez feat. Last Lights
