= Workin' on It =

Workin' on It may refer to:

- Workin' on It, an album by Adam Gregory
- "Workin' on It", a song by Meghan Trainor from the album Treat Myself
- "Workin' on It", a song by Andy Grammer from the album The Good Parts

== See also ==
- "Working on It", a song by Chris Rea
- "Workinonit", a song by J Dilla from the album Donuts (album)
