= Country Evolution =

Studio album by Home Free
- Released: September 18, 2015
- Recorded: 2014–2015
- Length: 47:06
- Label: Columbia
- Producer: Home Free

Home Free chronology
Full of Cheer (2014)	Country Evolution (2015)

Country Evolution is the seventh studio album by the American a cappella band Home Free and the last that included founding member Chris Rupp. It was released on September 18, 2015, with pre-orders being made available on August 21. The album includes five original songs and nine covers, including collaborations with The Oak Ridge Boys, Charlie Daniels, and Taylor Davis.

== Commercial performance ==
The album debuted at No. 4 on the Top Country Albums chart, and No. 48 on the Billboard 200, selling 9,700 copies in its debut week in the US. The album has sold 63,200 copies in the US as of April 2017.

== Track listing ==
No.	Title	Writer(s)	Original artist	Length
1.	"Summer In the Country"	Mark Nesler	Home Free	3:40
2.	"Good Ol' Country Harmony"	Tim Foust	Home Free	3:25
3.	"9 to 5"	Dolly Parton	Dolly Parton	3:58
4.	"Elvira" (featuring The Oak Ridge Boys)	Dallas Frazier	The Oak Ridge Boys	2:54
5.	"Don't It Feel Good"	Tim Foust; Darren Rust	Home Free	3:37
6.	"Alabama Sampler"	Randy Owen, Byron Hill, John Schweers, Roger Murrah, Randy VanWarmer, Murray Kellum, Dan Mitchell, Ronnie Rogers, Don Goodman, Becky Hobbs	Alabama	4:06
7.	"Seven Bridges Road"	Steve Young	The Eagles	2:47
8.	"Friends in Low Places"	Dewayne Blackwell; Earl Bud Lee	Garth Brooks	3:37
9.	"Honey, I'm Good."	Andy Grammer; Nolan Sipe	Andy Grammer	3:22
10.	"Fishin' in the Dark/Down in the Boondocks"	Wendy Waldman; Jim Photoglo; Karen Fairchild; Wayne Kirkpatrick; Kimberly Roads; Phillip Sweet; Jimi Westbrook	The Nitty Gritty Dirt Band/Little Big Town	3:41
11.	"The Devil Went Down to Georgia" (featuring Charlie Daniels and Taylor Davis)	Charlie Daniels; Tom Crain; Joel DiGregorio; Fred Edwards; Charles Hayward; James W. Marshall	Charlie Daniels	3:41
12.	"House Party"	Sam Hunt; Zach Crowell; Jerry Flowers	Sam Hunt	3:25
13.	"California Country"	Austin Brown	Home Free	3:49
14.	"Serenity"	Home Free	Home Free	1:04
Total length:				47:06

== Personnel ==
- Austin Brown - tenor lead and backing vocals
- Rob Lundquist - tenor lead and backing vocals
- Chris Rupp - baritone lead and backing vocals, bass backing vocals
- Tim Foust - vocal bass, bass lead and backing vocals, baritone and tenor lead vocals
- Adam Rupp - vocal percussion, beatboxing, backing vocals

On parts of some songs Tim Foust would briefly move from bass to either baritone or tenor and Chris Rupp would take his place, both live and in the studio.

== Charts ==
Chart (2015)	Peak position
US Billboard 200	46
US Top Country Albums (Billboard)	4
