= Tipi-tap =

- Digital cover

EP by Kep1er
- Released: November 1, 2024
- Genre: K-pop
- Length: 13:43
- Language: Korean
- Labels: WakeOne; Klap

Kep1er chronology
Kep1going On (2024)	Tipi-tap (2024)	Against the World (2025)

Singles from Tipi-tap
- 1. "Tipi-tap" Released: November 1, 2024

Tipi-tap is the sixth extended play by South Korean girl group Kep1er. It was released by WakeOne and Klap Entertainment on November 1, 2024, and contains five tracks, including the lead single of the same name.

== Background ==
Kep1er was formed through the reality survival show Girls Planet 999 (2021). Their initial contract lasted for thirty months, and expired in July 2024. In May 2024, WakeOne announced that all members of Kep1er, except Mashiro and Yeseo, renewed their contracts with the agency.

On October 7, 2024, it was reported that Kep1er will be releasing a new album on November 1 later that year, their first release since Mashiro and Yeseo's departure. This was confirmed three days later, when WakeOne announced Kep1er's sixth EP Tipi-tap. The album's track listing was released on October 15, with the single of the same name announced as the album's lead single. On October 21, a trailer film for the album, titled New Connection, was released. Tipi-tap was released on November 1, along with the music video for its lead single of the same name.

== Promotion ==
Prior to the announcement of the album, Kep1er performed the track "Sync-love" at KCON Germany 2024 in September. On October 17, a fan event titled Tipi-map was announced in support of the album's release.

== Composition ==
The opening track "Sync-love" was described as a hyper-pop dance song with "strong drums and bass".

== Track listing ==
Track listing for Tipi-tap
No.	Title	Lyrics	Music	Arrangement	Length
1.	"Sync-love"	Rid Kruger; Kkanari; Aileen; Kwon Hye-rin (153/Joombas)	Kruger; Kkanari; Aileen	Kruger; Kkanari	2:50
2.	"Tipi-tap"	Se.A; Kruger; Spoon (153/Joombas); Youha; B&NAz (153/Joombas); Ee-hwa (MUMW); Ee-mog (Jamfactory); Subbit (ARTiffect); Maria Marcus; Arineh Karmi	Se.A; Lee Won-jong; Kruger; Youha	Lee W.; Kruger	2:52
3.	"Drip"	Kwon Yeo-ul (153/Joombas); Hwang Eun-bich (ARTiffect); Young-eun; S. Brenan; M. Andersson; Jon Mills	Brenan; Andersson; Mills	Andersson; Mills	2:28
4.	"Bitter Taste"	Na Jeong-ah (153/Joombas); Kruger; Haesa (MUMW)	Noah Barer; Wilson McBeath; Carly Gilbert; Aijia Grammer; Hautboi Rich; Kruger	Barer; McBeath; Kruger	2:37
5.	"Heart Surf"	C'SA; Bong Eun-yeong (Jamfactory); Young-eun; Lee Hye-yum (Jamfactory); Na Jeong-ah (153/Joombas); Lee Ee-wu (MUMW)	C'SA; Maiz; Heon	Maiz; Heon	2:53
Total length:					13:43

== Charts ==
=== Weekly charts ===
Weekly chart performance for Tipi-tap
Chart (2024–2025)	Peak position
Japanese Albums (Oricon)	13
Japanese Combined Albums (Oricon)	22
Japanese Hot Albums (Billboard Japan)	77
South Korean Albums (Circle)	3
US Billboard 200	147
US Independent Albums (Billboard)	21
US World Albums (Billboard)	4

=== Monthly charts ===
Monthly chart performance for Tipi-tap
Chart (2024)	Peak position
South Korean Albums (Circle)	16

== Release history ==
Release history and formats for Tipi-tap
Region	Date	Format	Label(s)	Ref.
Various	November 1, 2024	Digital download; streaming	WakeOne; Klap	
South Korea	November 1, 2024	CD	WakeOne	
United States	November 1, 2024	CD	Klap; Graff	
Various	November 14, 2024	CD	Klap; Graff	
