= Monster (Andy Grammer album) =

Studio album by Andy Grammer
- Released: October 4, 2024
- Length: 32:30
- Labels: S-Curve; Hollywood
- Producers: Sam Barsh; Colin Brittain; Andrew DeRoberts; Adam Friedman; Andy Grammer; Bram Inscore; Jeff Gitty

Andy Grammer chronology
The Art of Joy (2022)	Monster (2024)	The Friends & Family Sessions (2025)

Singles from Monster
- 1. "Without You" Released: June 5, 2024; 2. "I Do" Released: August 2, 2024; 3. "Magic" Released: October 2, 2024

Monster is the fifth studio album by the American singer Andy Grammer, released on October 4, 2024, through S-Curve Records and Hollywood Records. It includes the singles "Without You", "I Do" with Maddie & Tae, and "Magic".

Originally titled Behind My Smile, the album was slated for a June 23, 2023 release led by the single "Love Is the New Money".

A deluxe version was released on November 1, 2024 which included all of his previously released singles included on his The Art of Joy (EP) and the subsequent stand-alone singles between 2022-2024 in addition to two previously unreleased songs "Gray" and "Jump" as well as a new version of his single "Joy."

== Track listing ==
Monster – Standard edition
No.	Title	Writer(s)	Producer(s)	Length
1.	"Monster"	Andrew Grammer	Adam Friedman; Andy Grammer	2:37
2.	"Without You"	Andrew Grammer; Sam Ashworth; Sam Barsh; Jeff "Gitty" Gitelman	Jeff Gitty; Barsh^{[p]}; Andy Grammer	3:12
3.	"Magic"	Andrew Grammer; Bram Inscore; Autumn Rowe	Inscore; Friedman; Andy Grammer	3:11
4.	"Bigger Man"	Andrew Grammer; Adam Friedman	Friedman; Andy Grammer	2:45
5.	"I Do" (featuring Maddie & Tae)	Andrew Grammer; Jon Nite; Jake Torrey; Andrew DeRoberts	DeRoberts^{[p]}; Mike Daly^{[v]}	3:15
6.	"Unforgivable" (featuring Aijia)	Andrew Grammer; Aijia Grammer	Friedman; Andy Grammer	3:05
7.	"Save a Spot in the Back for Me"	Andrew Grammer; Gitelman	Jeff Gitty; Andy Grammer	3:24
8.	"Blind Spots"	Andrew Grammer	Friedman; Andy Grammer	2:24
9.	"Still Smiling"	Andrew Grammer; Colin Brittain; Kevin Bard	Brittain; Andy Grammer	2:36
10.	"Not the End (Lisa's Song)"	Andrew Grammer; Aijia Grammer	Friedman; Andy Grammer	2:27
11.	"Friends and Family"	Andrew Grammer	Friedman; Andy Grammer	3:34
Total length:				32:30

Monster – Deluxe edition
No.	Title	Writer(s)	Producer(s)	Length
12.	"Gray" (with Aijia)	Andrew Grammer; Aijia Grammer	Friedman	2:49
13.	"Joy" (with Trombone Shorty and Galactic)	Andrew Grammer; Mark Nilan Jr.; Michael Pollack	Ben Ellman; Robert Mercurio	3:13
14.	"Jump"	Andrew Grammer; Barry Cohen; Ross Golan; Jared Scharff	Gingerbread; Scharff; Andy Grammer	2:13
15.	"Lease on Life"	Andrew Grammer; Inscore; Nolan Sipe; Torrey	Inscore	2:48
16.	"Damn It Feels Good to Be Me"	Andrew Grammer; Sam Hollander; Jon Levine; Grant Michaels	Levine	2:18
17.	"Love Myself"	Andrew Grammer; Skyler Stonestreet; Mike Wise	Wise	3:07
18.	"Joy"	Andrew Grammer; Nilan; Pollack	Levine; Neff-U	3:14
19.	"Saved My Life" (with R3hab)	Andrew Grammer; Fadil El Ghoul; Levine; Johnny Simpson; Torrey	Levine; R3hab	2:55
20.	"Good Man (First Love)"	Andrew Grammer	Neff-U	2:40
21.	"The Wrong Party" (with Fitz and the Tantrums)	Andrew Grammer; Michael Fitzpatrick; Inscore; Brett McLaughlin; Jessica Newham	Inscore	2:40
22.	"Good in Me"	Andrew Grammer; Levine; Sipe; Torrey	Levine	3:01
23.	"Good Company"	Andrew Grammer; Levine; Torrey	Levine	2:38
24.	"These Tears"	Andrew Grammer; Anthony M. Jones; Torrey	Tone	2:50
25.	"I Need a New Money"	Andrew Grammer	Neff-U	2:07
26.	"Love Is the New Money"	Andrew Grammer; Sean Douglas; Midi Jones; Levine	Levine	2:31
27.	"Expensive" (with Pentatonix)	Andrew Grammer; Inscore	Inscore	3:32
Total length:				77:06

=== Notes ===
- ^{^[p]} indicates a producer and vocal producer
- ^{^[v]} indicates a vocal producer

== Personnel ==
Credits are adapted from the album's liner notes and Tidal.

=== Musicians ===
- Andy Grammer – lead vocals, background vocals (all tracks); mandolin (tracks 1–4, 9, 10), banjo (1), percussion (4, 8, 10), stomps and claps (5), piano (6, 10, 11), trumpet (9), acoustic guitar (12)
- Adam Friedman – bass, drum kit, drum programming (1, 3, 4, 8, 10, 11); background vocals (1, 3, 4, 8, 11), synthesizers (1, 3, 11, 12), electric guitar (1, 11), acoustic guitar (3, 10–12), keyboards (3, 10, 11), piano (4, 6, 8), percussion (4, 8, 10), organ (4), banjo (8, 10), Wurlitzer (11), programming (12)
- Drew McKeon – drums (2, 7)
- Sam Ashworth – acoustic guitar (2)
- Bryan Page – violin (2)
- Sora M. Lopez – cello (2)
- Bram Inscore – synthesizers (3, 15, 21); strings, keyboards (3); alto vocals, piano (15, 21); background vocals, drum kit, guitar (15); percussion, programming, vocals (21)
- Jake Torrey – background vocals (5, 15), playing card percussion (5), acoustic guitar (15), guitar (22, 24)
- Andrew DeRoberts – background vocals, drums, percussion, bass, keyboards, guitars, programming (5)
- Maddie Font – lead vocals, background vocals (5)
- Tae Kerr – lead vocals, background vocals (5)
- Jon Nite – background vocals (5)
- Aijia Grammer – vocals (6, 12), background vocals (7, 11)
- Miles Julian – trumpet (7)
- Colin Brittain – guitar, drums, synthesizer, bass, background vocals (9)
- Blake Coddington – guitar, background vocals (9)
- Eric Silva – background vocals (9)
- George Bjorvik – strings, string arrangement (11)
- Stanton Moore – drum kit, percussion (13)
- Andriu Yanovski – organ, piano (13)
- Robert Mercurio – alto vocals (13)
- Ari Teitel – guitar (13)
- Rich Vogel – piano (13)
- Nolan Sipe – background vocals (15)
- Mike Wise – drum kit, guitar, piano, programming, synthesizer (17)
- Herag Sanbalian – guitar, programming (17)
- Theron Feemster – piano (18, 20, 21), drum kit (18, 20), organ (18), programming (20)
- Kevin Williams – flute, tuba (18, 20, 21)
- Sean Erick – trumpet (18, 20, 21)
- Christine Smit – vocals (18, 22)
- Revelday – vocals (18, 22)
- Ronnie O'Hannon – vocals (18, 22)
- Tia Britt – vocals (18, 22)
- David Parks – alto vocals (18)
- Jon Levine – programming (19, 22); alto vocals, organ, percussion, piano (19)
- Jon Sosin – guitar (19)
- India Carney – background vocals (20)
- Kyle Mann – guitar (20)
- Betty Who – background vocals (21)
- Brett McLaughlin – background vocals (21)
- Noelle Scaggs – background vocals (21)
- Kyle Moscovich – trumpet (21)
- Fitz and the Tantrums – vocals (21)
- Eman Cervantes – drum kit (22)
- Tone – alto vocals, drum kit, piano, programming (24)
- Pentatonix – vocals (27)

=== Technical ===
- Eric J Dubowsky – mixing (1–12, 14–22, 24, 26, 27)
- Count – mixing (13)
- Johannes Raassina – mixing (23)
- Mike Mangini – mixing (25)
- Matt Curtin – mixing assistance (1–11, 15)
- Chris Gehringer – mastering
- Will Quinnell – mastering assistance (1–11, 15)
- Rich Rich – engineering (5)
- Andrew DeRoberts – engineering (5)
- Tommy Turner – engineering (12)
- Rick Nelson – engineering (13)
- Kyle Mann – engineering (18, 20)
- Jon Levine – engineering (19, 22)
- Mike Stankiewicz – additional engineering (5)
