= Honey, I'm Good =

Single by Andy Grammer

from the album Magazines or Novels
- Released: November 11, 2014
- Genre: Pop rock; pop; country pop; country folk
- Length: 3:19
- Label: S-Curve
- Songwriters: Andy Grammer; Nolan Sipe
- Producers: Sipe; Brian West; Steve Greenberg

Andy Grammer singles chronology
"Back Home" (2014)	"Honey, I'm Good" (2014)	"Good to Be Alive (Hallelujah)" (2015)

Music video
- "Honey I'm Good" on YouTube

"Honey, I'm Good" is the second single from American musician Andy Grammer's second studio album, Magazines or Novels (2014). It was first released in the US in November 2014 and began receiving radio airplay in February 2015. The song peaked at number 9 on the Billboard Hot 100, making it Grammer's first top 10 hit and highest-charting single to date. It has been certified triple-platinum by the RIAA and was ranked one of the 10 best-selling songs of 2015 by Nielsen SoundScan. It also reached number four in Canada and was certified five-times platinum in the country. The single was written by Grammer and Nolan Sipe, and was produced by Steve Greenberg, Brian West and Sipe.

A duet with the Eli Young Band was released to country radio on July 27, 2015.

== Lyrical meaning and composition ==
The song's lyrics revolve around the concept of monogamy and staying faithful in a relationship. Upon being asked about the inspiration behind the song, Grammer stated, "The song's about staying honest and being like, 'Yes, you are smoking hot, but I got a lady at home who is incredible. It's worth staying truthful.'"

"Honey, I'm Good" is written in the key of A major with a tempo of 122 beats per minute. The song is performed in cut (2/2) time, and Grammer's vocals span from A_{3} to C♯_{6}.

== Release ==
"Honey, I'm Good" is Grammer's second single from his second studio album Magazines or Novels and was released as a single in the United States on November 21, 2014 with a video following on December 12, 2014. It was scheduled for play on hot adult contemporary radio on January 19, 2015, but the single's add date was later pushed back to February 2, 2015, to coincide with its contemporary hit radio release. The song was made available to stream on Spotify in the UK on May 31, 2015, and was released to digital retailers there on July 13, 2015. "Honey, I'm Good" was re-recorded with guest vocals by American country group Eli Young Band and digitally released on July 14, 2015. This version began receiving airplay on country radio on July 27, 2015.

== Reception ==
In an article in the New York Post, Chelsea Samelson writes: "It's got that down-to-earth realism, and he's not boasting or taking some holier-than-thou stance. In fact, he sings that 'better men than me have failed, drinking from that unholy grail.'"

== Music video ==
In November 2014, a lyric video was released that incorporated vintage comics (two out-of-print titles: Space Detective and Out of This World) for a comedic video directed by Jason Merrin.

In December 2014, the official music video was released, featuring a montage of 100 real-life couples (who've been together from a few months to 70 years), including Grammer and his wife Aijia Grammer.

== Covers ==
The song was covered by Irish country artist Ritchie Remo in August 2015. The song also appears on his album Hit The Diff. Remo also released a music video directed by Eddie Creaney, Shane Doyle and Philip Magowan. It was also covered by American a cappella country group Home Free on their 2015 album Country Evolution, with a music video of the song released in April of that year.

== Charts ==
=== Weekly charts ===
Weekly chart performance for "Honey, I'm Good"
Chart (2014–2015)	Peak position
Australia (ARIA)	64
Canada Hot 100 (Billboard)	4
Canada AC (Billboard)	1
Canada CHR/Top 40 (Billboard)	15
Canada Hot AC (Billboard)	3
Czech Republic Airplay (ČNS IFPI)	25
Czech Republic Singles Digital (ČNS IFPI)	37
France (SNEP)	175
Mexico Ingles Airplay (Billboard)	8
Netherlands (Single Top 100)	100
Scottish Singles Sales (Official Charts)	35
Slovakia Airplay (ČNS IFPI)	69
Slovakia Singles Digital (ČNS IFPI)	45
South Africa Airplay (EMA)	9
Sweden (Sverigetopplistan)	72
UK Singles (Official Charts)	65
US Billboard Hot 100	9
US Adult Contemporary (Billboard)	3
US Adult Pop Airplay (Billboard)	1
US Country Airplay (Billboard) Duet with Eli Young Band	41
US Dance Club Songs (Billboard)	1
US Hot Country Songs (Billboard) Duet with Eli Young Band	37
US Pop Airplay (Billboard)	8

=== Year-end charts ===
Annual chart rankings for "Honey, I'm Good"
Chart (2015)	Rank
Canada (Canadian Hot 100)	14
US Billboard Hot 100	25
US Adult Contemporary (Billboard)	10
US Adult Pop Songs (Billboard)	6
US Hot Dance Club Songs (Billboard)	3
US Pop Songs (Billboard)	38

Chart (2016)	Position
US Adult Contemporary (Billboard)	40

== Certifications ==
Region	Certification	Certified units/sales
Australia (ARIA)	2× Platinum	140,000^{‡}
Canada (Music Canada)	5× Platinum	347,000
Denmark (IFPI Danmark)	Gold	45,000^{‡}
New Zealand (RMNZ)	2× Platinum	60,000^{‡}
Sweden (GLF)	Gold	20,000^{‡}
United Kingdom (BPI)	Silver	200,000^{‡}
United States (RIAA)	5× Platinum	1,500,000
^{‡} Sales+streaming figures based on certification alone.

== Release history ==
Country	Date	Format	Version	Label	Ref.
United States	November 21, 2014		Solo version	S-Curve Records	
United States	February 2, 2015	Adult contemporary	Solo version	S-Curve Records	
United States	February 2, 2015	Contemporary hit radio	Solo version	S-Curve Records	
United States	February 2, 2015	Hot adult contemporary	Solo version	S-Curve Records	
United Kingdom	July 13, 2015	Digital download	Solo version	Arista Records	
North America	July 14, 2015	Digital download	Eli Young Band duet	S-Curve Records	
United States	July 27, 2015	Country radio	Eli Young Band duet	S-Curve Records	

== See also ==
- List of number-one dance singles of 2015 (U.S.)
