= Magazines or Novels =

Studio album by Andy Grammer
- Released: August 5, 2014
- Genres: Pop rock; pop
- Length: 42:48
- Label: S-Curve

Andy Grammer chronology
Crazy Beautiful (2013)	Magazines or Novels (2014)	Spotify Singles (2017)

Singles from Magazines or Novels
- 1. "Back Home" Released: March 25, 2014; 2. "Honey, I'm Good" Released: November 11, 2014; 3. "Good to Be Alive (Hallelujah)" Released: August 24, 2015

Professional ratings
Review scores
Source	Rating
AllMusic	3/5 stars
Newsday	C

Magazines or Novels is the second studio album by American recording artist Andy Grammer, released on August 5, 2014, through S-Curve Records. It includes the triple-platinum selling hit single "Honey, I'm Good" which peaked at #9 on the Billboard Hot 100. A special edition exclusive to Target stores was released in May 2015 featuring two newly recorded tracks: "Kamikaze" and "Amazing". A re-issued deluxe edition was released on November 20, 2015, with new artwork and included the album's third single, "Good to Be Alive (Hallelujah)".

== Singles ==
Prior to the album's release, Grammer released a single "Back Home" on March 25, 2014, co-written by Grammer and Ryan Met of the band AJR, who co-produced the track with Jon Levine. The single was used in the 2016 MacGillivray Freeman film National Parks Adventure. The album's second single, "Honey, I'm Good" was co-written by Grammer and Nolan Sipe and produced by Sipe, Steve Greenberg and Brian West. Grammer went on the "Siren Songs" tour with Los Angeles-based recording artist Hughie Stone Fish in September 2014.

The second single "Honey, I'm Good" was released in the US in November 2014, and eventually impacted radio in February 2015. It became his biggest single to date, peaking at #9 on the Billboard Hot 100 and being certified triple-platinum by the RIAA.

In August 2015, during his run on Dancing with the Stars, Grammer released a new single "Good to Be Alive (Hallelujah)" (also written by Ryan Met from AJR) which was included on a reissued deluxe version on November 6, 2015.

== Critical reception ==
Judah Joseph from The Huffington Post gave a positive review of the album saying "it is in ways reminiscent of John Mayer's earlier work" and compared Grammer's voice to Gavin DeGraw and Adam Levine's. "Magazines or Novels displays a level of consistent creativity and continued talent. [...] It surpasses the standard he set back in 2011". Joseph concluded describing the album as "emotionally complex collection of songs". Newsday reviewer Glenn Gamboa gave the album a C grade commenting "it feels like a desperate attempt to manufacture another hit" while he ultimately "ends up with cut-rate approximations of other artists (Maroon 5 and OneRepublic)." James Dinh from "SheKnows.com" analyzed the meanings of the songs and its contrasting lyrics and stated that "Grammer sprinkles a variety of lyrical themes throughout Magazines or Novels. While he plays up his lust for women (even though he's married) on the country-pop hoedown "Baby, I'm Good", he switches it up and assumes the role of sweet husband on the retro-sounding "Forever", using his easy-breezy falsetto to sing about how long his girl takes to get ready."

== Track listing ==
Magazines or Novels — Standard edition
No.	Title	Writer(s)	Length
1.	"Honey, I'm Good"	Andy Grammer; Nolan Sipe	3:19
2.	"Back Home"	Grammer; Ryan Met	3:19
3.	"Pushing"	Grammer; Met	3:09
4.	"Forever"	Grammer; Jamie Hartman	3:39
5.	"Holding Out"	Grammer; Jon Bellion	3:29
6.	"Remind You"	Grammer	4:28
7.	"Masterpiece"	Grammer	3:35
8.	"Sinner"	Grammer; John Cunningham; Zoe Moss; Amund Bjørklund; Espun Lind	3:41
9.	"Red Eye"	Grammer; James Abrahart; Abram Dean; Josh Kear; Mason Levy; Tom Meredith; Josiah Rosen	3:36
10.	"Blame It on the Stars"	Grammer; Jon Levine; Boots Ottestad	3:12
11.	"Kiss You Slow"	Grammer	4:16

Magazines or Novels — Target exclusive edition (bonus tracks)
No.	Title	Writer(s)	Length
12.	"Amazing"	Grammer	3:36
13.	"Kamikaze"	Grammer	3:08

Magazines or Novels — Deluxe edition (bonus tracks)
No.	Title	Writer(s)	Length
12.	"Co-Pilot"	Grammer; Matt Wallace; Aron Friedman	3:05
13.	"Good to Be Alive (Hallelujah)"	Grammer	3:09
14.	"Fences"	Grammer	3:38
15.	"Honey, I'm Good" (duet with Eli Young Band)	Grammer; Sipe	3:19
16.	"Honey, I'm Good." (DJ Mike D Remix)	Grammer; Sipe	3:33

== Charts ==
=== Weekly charts ===
Chart (2014–2015)	Peak position
US Billboard 200	19
US Digital Albums (Billboard)	12

=== Year-end charts ===
Chart (2015)	Position
US Billboard 200	65

== Certifications ==
Region	Certification	Certified units/sales
New Zealand (RMNZ)	Gold	7,500^{‡}
United States (RIAA)	Gold	500,000^{^}
^{^} Shipments figures based on certification alone.^{‡} Sales+streaming figures based on certification alone.
