= Home Free (group) =

American a cappella group

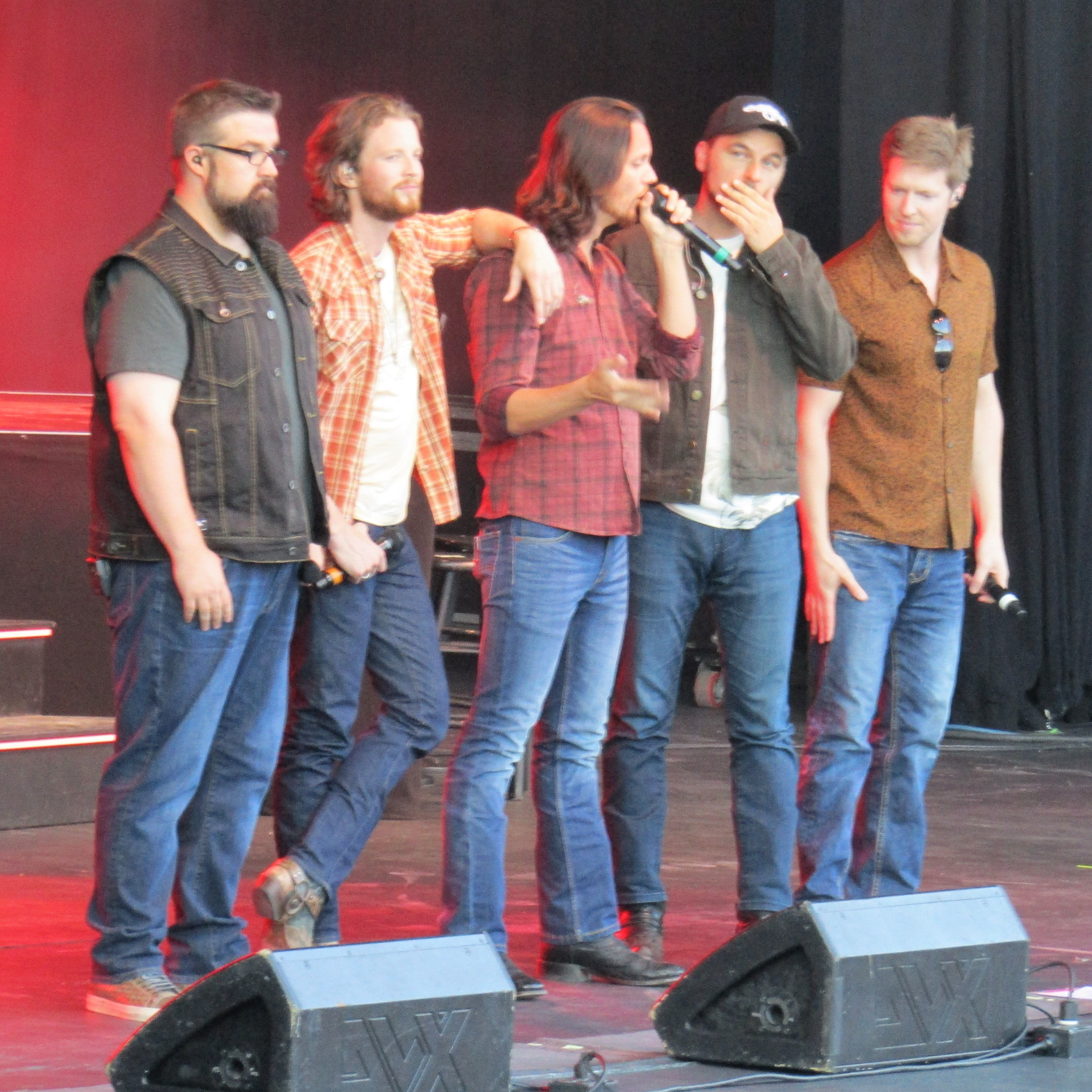
- Home Free in 2018 (left to right: Rob Lundquist, Austin Brown, Tim Foust, Adam Chance, Adam Rupp)

Background information
- Also known as: Home Free Vocal Band
- Origin: Mankato, Minnesota, U.S.
- Genres: A cappella, country
- Years active: 2001–present
- Members: Adam Rupp; Rob Lundquist; Tim Foust; Adam Chance; Adam Bell-Bastien
- Past members: Chris Rupp; Matt Atwood; Darren Scruggs; Dan Lemke; Chris Foss; Elliott Robinson; Troy Horne; Matthew Tuey; Joe Fine; Joe Kent; Austin Brown
- Website: homefreemusic.com

Home Free is an American country a cappella group of five vocalists: Adam Bell-Bastien, Adam Chance, Rob Lundquist, Adam Rupp, and Tim Foust. Starting as a show group, they toured with approximately 200 shows a year across the United States. The group won the fourth season of The Sing-Off on NBC in 2013. They sang an arrangement of Hunter Hayes's "I Want Crazy" as their final competitive song, earning the group $100,000 and a recording contract with Sony.

The band released their first major label album, Crazy Life, in February 2014. Their latest album, 90’s Country Mixtape, Vol. 1, was released in October 2026.

== History ==
Home Free was originally formed in January 2001 by Chris Rupp, Adam Rupp and Matt Atwood in Mankato, Minnesota, when some of its members were still in their teens. The five founding members were brothers Chris and Adam Rupp, Matt Atwood, Darren Scruggs, and Dan Lemke. They took their name from a boat owned by Atwood's grandfather who helped support the group financially in their early years. The group began as a hobby for the singers, but they gradually grew in experience and popularity. By 2007 they had enough of a following to pursue music full-time. During this period, the Rupp brothers and Atwood formed the core of the group, with Atwood singing lead tenor. Other members of the group came and went. Current member Rob Lundquist, another Minnesotan, joined in 2008.

For much of the group's history they worked with many talented bass singers, but did not have a full-time committed bass voice. In 2007 Chris Foss sang with them. Elliott Robinson was added as bass in September 2008, and was replaced in June 2009 by Troy Horne. Later that year, Horne left to rejoin the House Jacks. To replace Horne they turned to Tim Foust, who first sang with them as a guest on their 2010 tour. A Texas native, Foust was then pursuing a career as a singer/songwriter of country music and had recently released a solo album, but was not ready to sign on full-time. Matthew Tuey sang with the group in the interim of 2011, until Foust joined them full-time in January 2012.

In 2012, Austin Brown was working on a Royal Caribbean cruise ship as a featured singer in their production shows. When Home Free joined the cruise as a guest performing group, they met and became close. Brown, who was born in Tifton, Georgia, let Home Free know that he would be interested in joining the group if they ever had an opening. At the end of 2012 lead singer Matt Atwood and his wife, who had married the previous year, were expecting their first child. Finding the group's touring schedule incompatible with family life, and having an opportunity to take over his family's real estate business in Mankato, Atwood made the decision to retire from the group. Home Free then invited Brown to join as lead tenor. He sang his first show with the group in October 2012, and became full-time in January 2013.

The group, made up of Chris and Adam Rupp, Lundquist, Foust and Brown, competed in and won the fourth season of The Sing-Off, recording their performances in September 2013. During that time, the group arranged for substitute performers to fulfill their previously scheduled concert commitments. The series was televised in December 2013, and the group headlined the Sing-Off tour across 32 cities in 2014.

Home Free in 2015

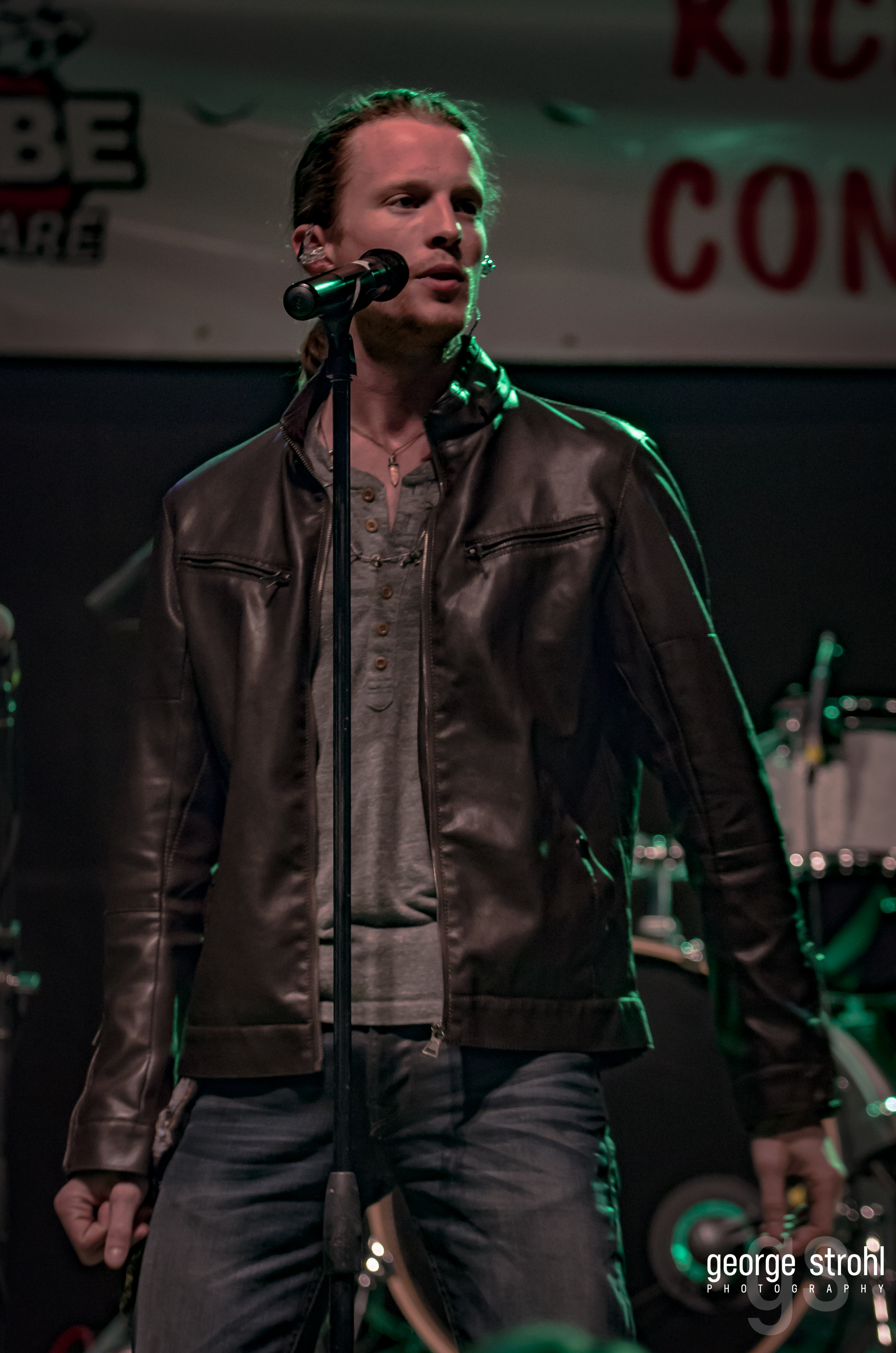
Austin Brown

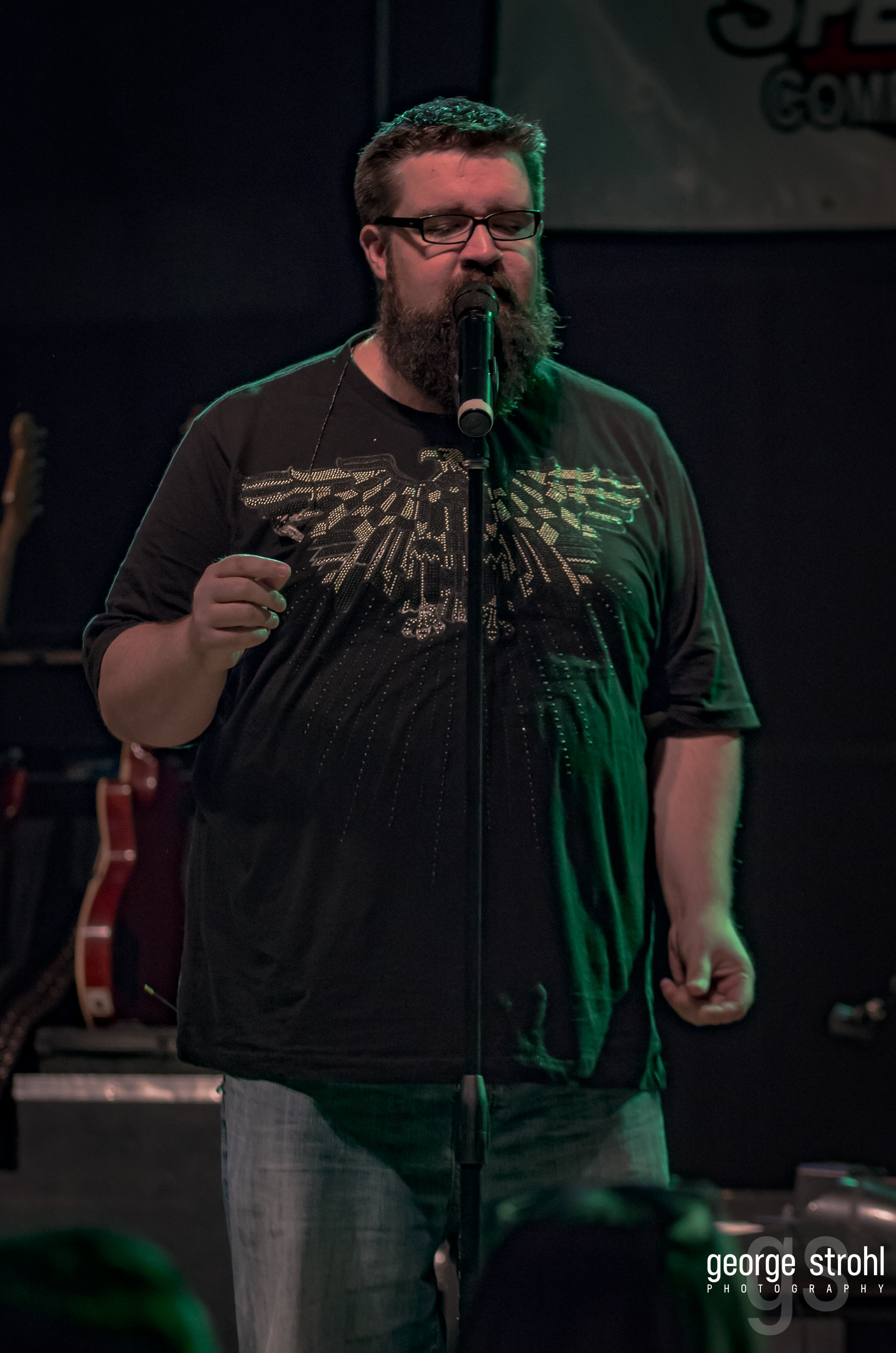
Rob Lundquist

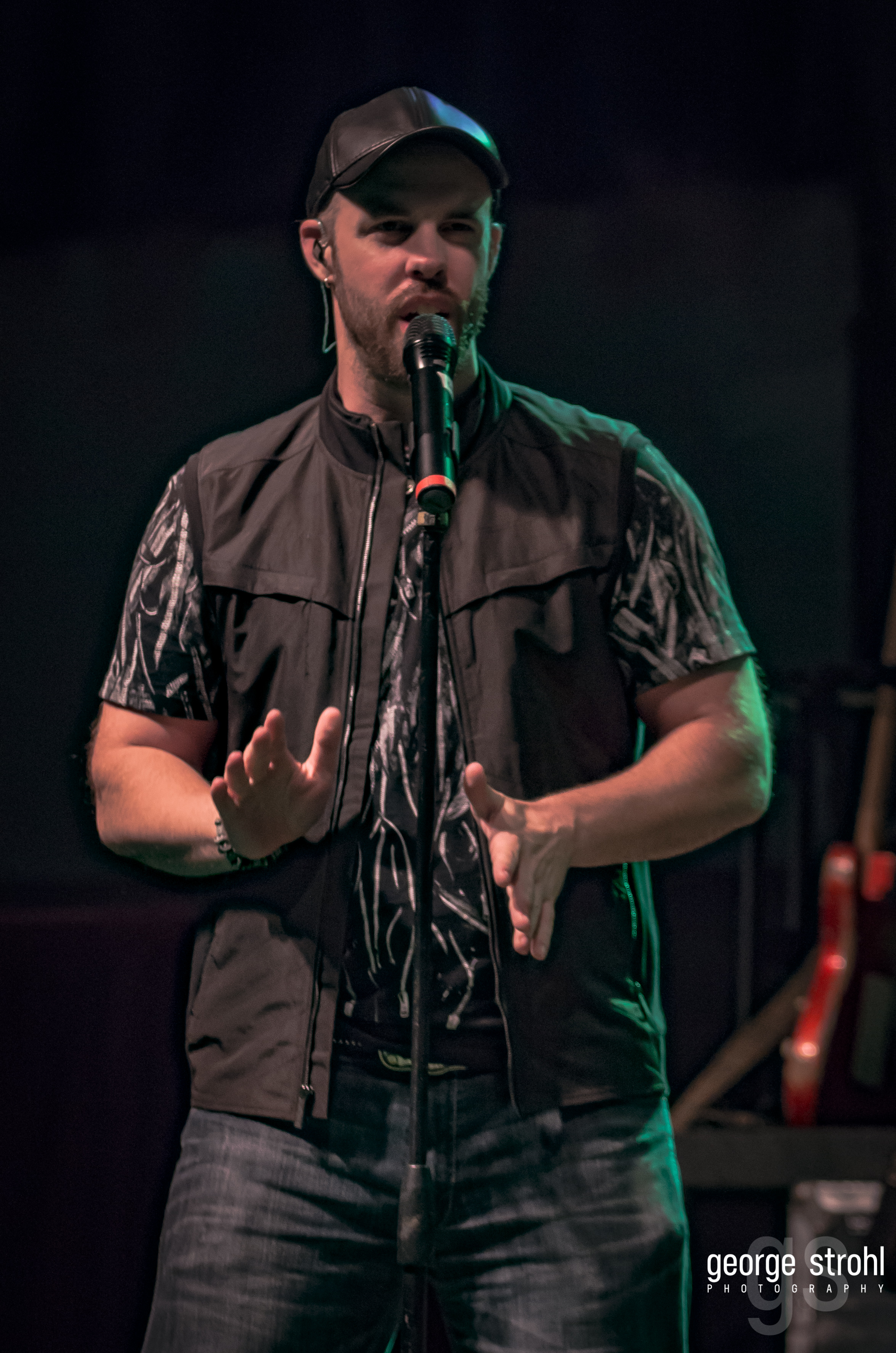
Chris Rupp

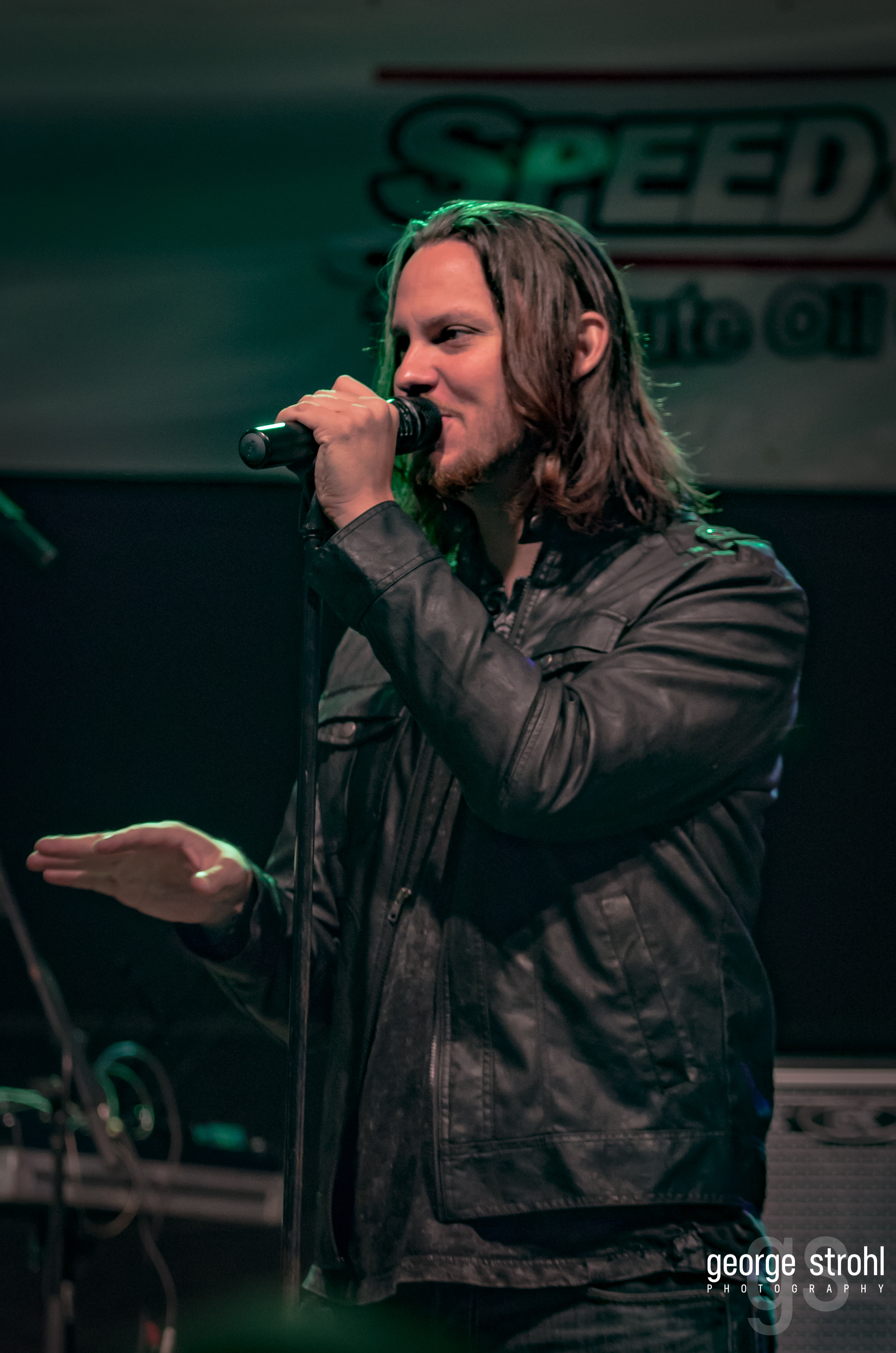
Tim Foust

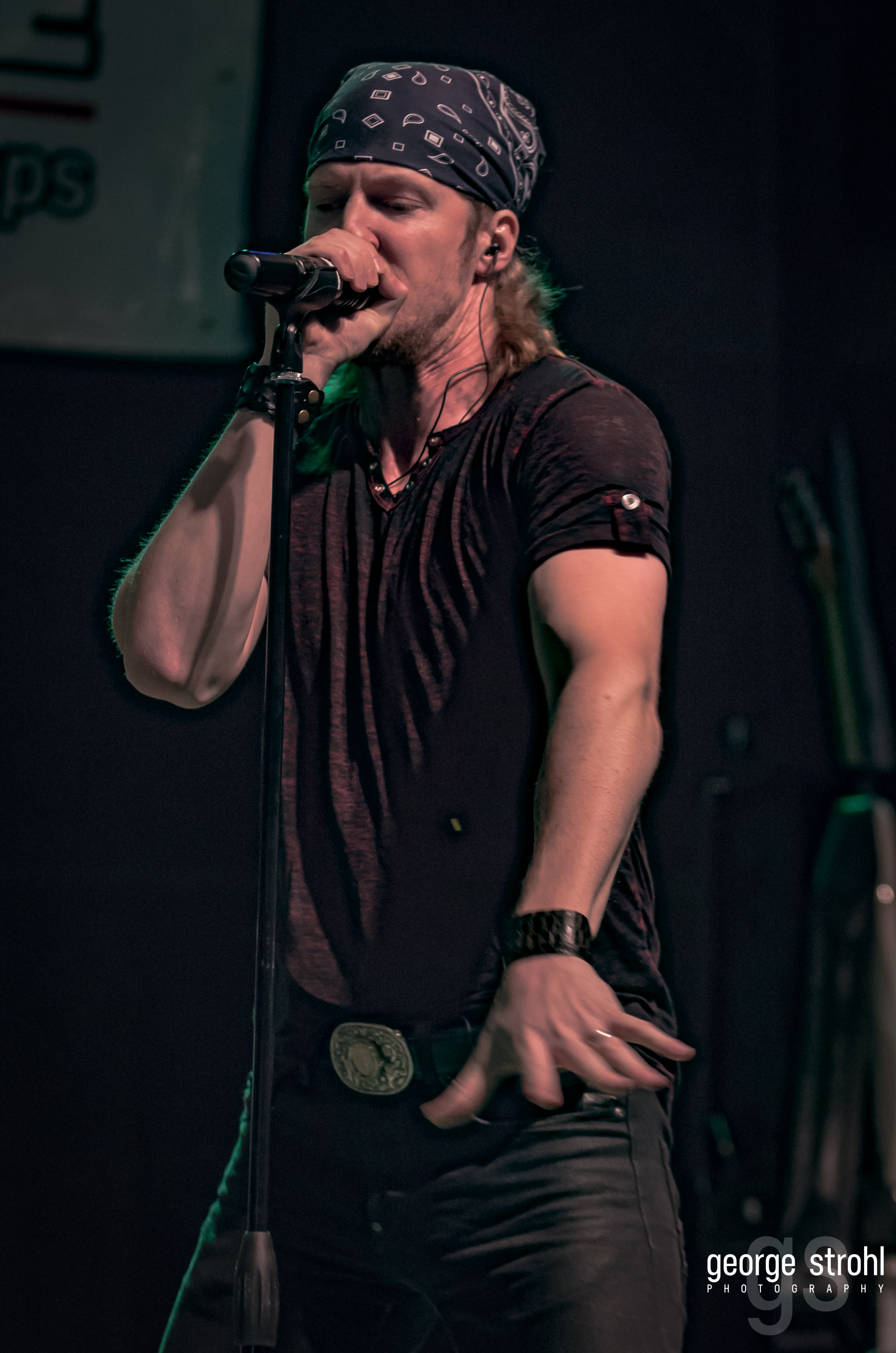
Adam Rupp

On March 18, 2016, it was announced that, after sixteen years of performing with the group, co-founder Chris Rupp would be leaving to pursue a solo career. He would be replaced after May 8 by Adam Chance, formerly of Street Corner Symphony. On February 15, 2024, Home Free announced that Brown would leave the band later in the year, the first lineup change in eight years. This announcement also included the release date of their next album—Crazy(er) Life, featuring re-recordings of songs from Crazy Life—to be their last album with Brown. Brown was replaced by Adam Bell-Bastien, who had performed as a member of the group several years earlier, in June. Brown subsequently competed on the twentieth season of America's Got Talent in 2025 advancing as far as the quarterfinals.

== Reception ==
An update of Home Free's 2014 album Full of Cheer called Full Of (Even More) Cheer was released in November 2016 and debuted at number two on the Top Country Albums Chart with 13,000 sold - the band's best performance on the chart at the time.

The band has been actively posting videos to their YouTube channel since 2009. In May 2020, they announced that they had reached 1 million subscribers to their channel. Home Free was also an early adopter of Patreon, where they crowdfund to raise money to produce their videos.

The band cultivates a fan base, known as Home Fries.

== Musical background and style ==
All five of Home Free's singers have formal musical training. Lundquist and the Rupp brothers all have bachelor's degrees in music. Adam Rupp's primary instrument is trumpet, but he also plays drums, keyboard, and bass guitar. After joining, Foust and Brown became active in writing and arranging.

In terms of musical roles, Home Free includes a lead tenor (Lundquist), a high tenor (Bell-Bastien), a baritone (Chance), a bass (Foust), and a beatboxer (Rupp), who provides percussive sounds. Lundquist and Chance sing traditional tenor and baritone harmony, respectively, and Foust sings bass with the range of a basso profundo. Former high tenor Austin Brown is commonly known by his ability to sing most of his high notes in chest or mixed voice. Foust is known for his extensive five-octave vocal range and his usage of the growl technique. Occasionally, Foust and Chance switch roles, as Chance was the former bass of Street Corner Symphony. All of the singers occasionally sing solos supported by the harmonies of the other singers. Rupp also sings third tenor in some songs.

Home Free's styling as a country group is relatively recent. Before Foust joined the group, Home Free was an all-purpose a cappella group, singing in a wide variety of styles, of which country was only a minor one. With the additions of Foust and Brown, the group moved more in the direction of country and found that audiences responded well to it. Home Free had auditioned three times for The Sing-Off (without Foust and Brown) and not been accepted. When auditioning for the fourth season, they made a conscious decision to style themselves as a country group. In an interview Brown said this identity is what grabbed the attention of The Sing-Off’s casting director, who said, “You guys really fit something we don’t have.”

== Collaborations ==
Home Free has collaborated with many notable artists. In 2015, based on a recommendation from his children's elementary school music teacher, they were featured on Kenny Rogers's final album Once Again It's Christmas, performing "Children, Go Where I Send Thee" with Rogers. Also in 2015, the Oak Ridge Boys collaborated with Home Free in a fully a capella version of their song "Elvira".

Don McLean invited them to collaborate on a 50th anniversary recording of his 1971 hit "American Pie". The music video for this performance went on to win three Telly awards in 2021. Home Free has collaborated on several occasions with fellow a capella artist Peter Hollens on "19 You + Me" in 2014 and the hymn "Amazing Grace" in 2016. In 2020, during the COVID-19 pandemic restrictions, Hollens and Home Free collaborated on a cover of the U2 song "I Still Haven't Found What I'm Looking For", incorporating a choir made up of over 200 members of their respective Patreon patrons; each performer or family group recorded their audio and video remotely.

Also in 2020, Home Free collaborated with Lee Greenwood and the Singing Sergeants of the United States Air Force Band in a recording of Greenwood's hit song "God Bless the U.S.A.". The song was released on June 30, 2020, and reached #1 in digital song sales as of July 18, 2020. Home Free created a song for the video game Skull and Bones (2024), which they performed at Summer Game Fest in June 2023. Other notable collaborations include Billy Gilman, Texas Hill (Casey James, Adam Wakefield, and formerly Craig Wayne Boyd), Mark Wills, Brooke Eden, Travis Collins, Amy Sheppard, Rachel Wammack, Lisa Cimorelli, Alabama, Taylor Davis, Jimmy Fortune, The Longest Johns, Chapel Hart, and Avi Kaplan.

In April 2024, Don McLean again invited Home Free to collaborate with him on a new version of his song, "Vincent". It was also announced that Home Free would be featured on the title track of McLean's next album, American Boys, released in May 2024.

Home Free released a cover of Beyoncé's "Texas Hold 'Em" with Chapel Hart in May 2025.

== Concert tours ==
Before their success on the Sing-Off, Home Free was touring at fairs and festivals across the US, as well as stints on cruise ships. Since then they have been part of the Sing-Off Tour, and headlined their own Crazy Life Tour (2014), Full of Cheer Tour (2014–15), Spring Tour (2015), Don't It Feel Good Tour (2015–16), A Country Christmas Tour (2016), Timeless World Tour (2017–18), and A Country Christmas Tour (2017). In January 2016 they embarked on their first tour outside North America with stops in Birmingham, UK; St. Andrews, Scotland; and London, UK (a planned stop in Dublin, Ireland was canceled due to weather). In September 2016 they had their first concert in Central Europe at the "2nd European Country Festival" in Pertisau, Austria. In September 2019 they began their Dive Bar Saints World Tour, which was postponed due to the ongoing COVID-19 pandemic. In December 2019 they began their Dive Bar Saints Christmas Tour in the US.

On October 8, 2020, the band announced an Indiegogo campaign to fund a virtual holiday concert called "Warmest Winter" to coincide with the release of a new CD of the same name. The campaign met its initial funding goal in nine hours and stretch goals were added for further funding. The pre-filmed concert was streamed from December 2 to 5, 2020, and featured guest appearances by Alabama and The Oak Ridge Boys, among others.

== Discography ==
=== Albums ===
Title	Details	Peak chart positions		Sales
Title	Details	US Country	US	Sales
From the Top	Release date: July 17, 2007; Label: Home Free; Chris Rupp, Adam Rupp, Matt Atwood, Joe Fine	—	—	
Kickin It Old School	Release date: March 30, 2009; Label: Home Free; C. Rupp, A. Rupp, Atwood, Rob Lundquist, Elliott Robinson	—	—	
Christmas Vol 1	Release date: January 18, 2010; Label: Home Free; C. Rupp, A. Rupp, Atwood, Lundquist, Robinson	—	—	
Christmas Vol 2	Release date: March 30, 2010; Label: Home Free; C. Rupp, A. Rupp, Atwood, Lundquist, Robinson	—	—	
Live from the Road	Release date: July 17, 2012; Label: Home Free Studios; C. Rupp, A. Rupp, Atwood, Lundquist, Tim Foust	—	—	
Crazy Life	Release date: January 13, 2014; Label: Columbia Records; C. Rupp, A. Rupp, Austin Brown, Lundquist, Foust	8	40	US: 71,800
Full of Cheer	Release date: October 27, 2014; Label: Sony; C. Rupp, A. Rupp, Brown, Lundquist, Foust	12	65	US: 85,500
Country Evolution	Release date: September 18, 2015; Label: Columbia; C. Rupp, A. Rupp, Brown, Lundquist, Foust	4	46	US: 63,200
Full of (Even More) Cheer	Release date: November 11, 2016; Label: Columbia; A. Rupp, Adam Chance, Brown, Lundquist, Foust	2	36	US: 38,500
Timeless	Release date: September 22, 2017; Label: Columbia; A. Rupp, Chance, Brown, Lundquist, Foust	3	28	US: 50,900
Dive Bar Saints	Release date: September 6, 2019; Label: Home Free; A. Rupp, Chance, Brown, Lundquist, Foust	4	44	US: 19,900
Warmest Winter	Release date: November 6, 2020; Label: Home Free; A. Rupp, Chance, Brown, Lundquist, Foust	37	—	
Land of the Free	Release date: June 25, 2021; Label: Home Free; A. Rupp, Chance, Brown, Lundquist, Foust	40	—	
The Sounds of Lockdown	Release date: April 15, 2022; Label: Home Free; A. Rupp, Chance, Brown, Lundquist, Foust	—	—	
So Long Dixie	Release date: November 4, 2022; Label: Home Free; A. Rupp, Chance, Brown, Lundquist, Foust	17	132	
As Seen on TV	Release date: November 17, 2023; Label: Home Free; A. Rupp, Chance, Brown, Lundquist, Foust	—	—	
Crazy(er) Life	Release date: March 29, 2024; Label: Home Free; A. Rupp, Chance, Brown, Lundquist, Foust	—	—	
Any Kind of Christmas	Release date: November 1, 2024; Label: Home Free; A. Rupp, Chance, Adam Bell-Bastien, Lundquist, Foust	—	—	
Challenge the Sea	Release date: September 19, 2025; Label: Home Free; A. Rupp, Chance, Bell-Bastien, Lundquist, Foust	—	—	
90's Country Mixtape Vol. 1	Release date: October 16, 2026; Label: Home Free; A. Rupp, Chance, Bell-Bastien, Lundquist, Foust	—	—	
"—" denotes releases that did not chart

=== Singles ===
Year	Single	Peak chart positions		Album
Year	Single	US Country	US	Album
2014	"Angels We Have Heard on High"	30	118	Full of Cheer

=== Original songs ===
Year	Songs	Writers	Album
2014	"Any Way the Wind Blows"	Mark Nesler, Jennifer Hanson, Marty Dodson	Crazy Life
2014	"Everything Will Be Okay" (Note: Originally performed by Tim Foust on his solo album The Best That I Could Do in 2012.)	Tim Foust, Dave Guisti	Crazy Life
2014	"I've Seen"	Tim Foust, Joe Bilotta, Henry O'Neill	Crazy Life
2014	"Champagne Taste (On a Beer Budget)"	Tim Foust, Joe Bilotta	Crazy Life
2014	"Crazy Life"	Kevin Fisher	Crazy Life
2014	"Full of Cheer"	Tim Foust	Full of Cheer
2015	"Summer In The Country"	Mark Nesler, George Teren	Country Evolution
2015	"Good Ol' Country Harmony"	Tim Foust, Darren Rust	Country Evolution
2015	"Don't It Feel Good"	Tim Foust, Darren Rust	Country Evolution
2015	"California Country"	Austin Brown, Darren Rust, Melissa Polinar	Country Evolution
2015	"Serenity"	Tim Foust	Country Evolution
2017	"It Looks Good"	Tim Foust, Mike Luginbill, Darren Rust	Timeless
2017	"When You Walk In"	Arlis Albritton, Brandon Chase, Chris Biano	Timeless
2017	"Good Ol' Boy Good Time"	Mark Nesler, Jim McCormick	Timeless
2017	"Timeless"	Mark Nesler, Lizzy McAvoy, Eric Arjes	Timeless
2019	"Remember This"	Tim Foust, Arlis Albritton, Donnie Reis, Chris Chatham	Dive Bar Saints
2019	"Leave This Town"	Chris Gelbuda, Chase McGill, Brett Tyler	Dive Bar Saints
2019	"Dive Bar Saints"	Brandon Chase, Arlis Albritton, Justin Morgan	Dive Bar Saints
2019	"Catch Me If You Can"	Keelan Donovan, Louis Johnson, Anna Rose Menken	Dive Bar Saints
2019	"Lonely Girl's World"	Austin Brown, Steven Martinez, Ava Suppelsa	Dive Bar Saints
2019	"Cross That Bridge"	Keelan Donovan, Matthew McVaney	Dive Bar Saints
2019	"Dreamer"	Dustin Christensen, Ross Ellis, Dan Fernandez	Dive Bar Saints
2019	"What's the World Coming to?"	Tim Foust, Eric Arjes, Mark Nesler	Dive Bar Saints
2019	"Why Not"	Jeffrey East, Patrick Dodge	Dive Bar Saints
2019	"Love Me Like That"	Austin Brown, Jeffrey East, Steven Martinez	Dive Bar Saints
2020	"Warmest Winter"	Austin Brown, Emma Brooke, Steven Martinez	Warmest Winter
2020	"Snow Globe"	Tim Foust, Keelan Donovan	Warmest Winter
2020	"Christmas Ain't for the Lonely"	Tim Foust, Chris Chatham, Darren Rust	Warmest Winter
2020	"Cold Hard Cash"	Austin Brown, Andrew Tufano, Annika Bennett	Warmest Winter
2020	"What We Need is Love"	Tim Foust, Ernie Halter	Warmest Winter
2021	"Land of the Free"	Tim Foust, Chris Chatham	Land of the Free
2022	"Road Sweet Road"	Tim Foust, Austin Brown, Adam Wakefield, Chris Chatham	So Long Dixie
2022	"Might as Well Be Me"	Tim Foust, Mark Nesler, Marty Dodson	So Long Dixie
2022	"Stargazer Lilies"	Austin Brown, Keelan Donovan	So Long Dixie
2022	"Playing with Fire"	Austin Brown, Andrew Tufano, Jeffrey East, Ernie Halter	So Long Dixie
2022	"What’s Left of My Heart"	Tim Foust, Mark Nesler, Marty Dodson	So Long Dixie
2022	"Understand"	Tim Foust, Jeffrey East, Patrick Dodge	So Long Dixie
2022	"MR"	Austin Brown, Steven Martinez, Lauren Hungate	So Long Dixie
2022	"Remember My Name"	Austin Brown, Andrew Tufano	So Long Dixie
2022	"Give Me a Sign"	Austin Brown, Andrew Tufano, Tiera Kennedy	So Long Dixie
2022	"Save the World"	Austin Brown, Andrew Tufano	So Long Dixie
2022	"Givin' Up On You (feat. Texas Hill)"	Tim Foust, Adam Wakefield	So Long Dixie
2022	"So Long Dixie"	Tim Foust, Austin Brown, Adam Wakefield, Chris Chatham	So Long Dixie
2023	"Skull and Bones" (Note: "Skull and Bones" is Home Free’s first ever Adam Chance original.)	Adam Chance	Single
2024	"Any Way the Wind Blows" [Home Free’s Version]	Mark Nesler, Jennifer Hanson, Marty Dodson	Crazy(er) Life
2024	"Everything Will Be Okay" [Home Free’s Version]	Tim Foust, Dave Guisti	Crazy(er) Life
2024	"I've Seen" [Home Free’s Version]	Tim Foust, Joe Bilotta, Henry O'Neill	Crazy(er) Life
2024	"Champagne Taste (On a Beer Budget)" [Home Free’s Version]	Tim Foust, Joe Bilotta	Crazy(er) Life
2024	"Crazy Life" [Home Free’s Version]	Kevin Fisher	Crazy(er) Life
2024	"Let Me Come Home" (Note: "Let Me Come Home" was originally performed by Adam Bell-Bastien and his husband Jerome in 2019. Adam Bell-Bastien wrote the original version of this song with Katya Diaz and Chris Hierro from the music duo called Break Out The Crazy. But Home Free’s version of this song contains changed lyrics by Adam Bell-Bastien, Tim Foust and Chris Chatham.)	Adam Bell-Bastien, Katya Diaz, Chris Hierro, Tim Foust, Chris Chatham	Any Kind of Christmas
2024	"Any Kind of Christmas"	Tim Foust, Arlis Albritton, Dave Brainard	Any Kind of Christmas
2024	"The Greatest Gifts of All"	Tim Foust, Chris Chatham	Any Kind of Christmas
2025	"Challenge the Sea (feat. The Longest Johns)"	Adam Chance, McKenzie Zamber, Reilly Zamber	Challenge the Sea
2025	"Bon Secour"	Adam Chance (instrumental)	Challenge the Sea
