= Good to Be Alive (Hallelujah) =

2015 song by Andy Grammer

Single by Andy Grammer

from the album Magazines or Novels (Deluxe edition)
- Released: August 24, 2015
- Recorded: 2014–15
- Genre: Pop
- Length: 3:09
- Label: S-Curve
- Songwriters: Andy Grammer; Ross Golan; Ian Kirkpatrick; Ryan Met
- Producers: Kirkpatrick; Golan; Grammer

Andy Grammer singles chronology
"Honey, I'm Good" (2014)	"Good to Be Alive (Hallelujah)" (2015)	"Fresh Eyes" (2016)

"Good to Be Alive (Hallelujah)" is a song by American singer Andy Grammer from the deluxe version of his sophomore album, Magazines or Novels. The song was released on August 24, 2015, during his run on Dancing with the Stars. The song was used in a series of Walmart savings commercials as well as Quaker Oats Chewy Bars.

== Composition ==
According to the sheet music published at Musicnotes.com, the song is written in the key of F major.

== Music video ==
The music video for "Good to Be Alive," was released to YouTube on November 19, 2015. It depicts Grammer as a parking valet who drives an orange sports car brought by a client and dances with other valets.

== Charts ==
=== Weekly charts ===
Chart (2015–2016)	Peak position
Canada AC (Billboard)	33
US Billboard Hot 100	62
US Adult Contemporary (Billboard)	20
US Adult Pop Airplay (Billboard)	12

=== Year-end charts ===
Chart (2016)	Position
US Adult Contemporary (Billboard)	50
US Adult Top 40 (Billboard)	42

== Certifications ==
Region	Certification	Certified units/sales
Canada (Music Canada)	Gold	40,000^{‡}
United States (RIAA)	Gold	500,000^{‡}
^{‡} Sales+streaming figures based on certification alone.

== Release history ==
List of release dates, showing region, formats, label and reference
Region	Date	Format(s)	Label	Ref.
United States	September 15, 2015	Contemporary hit radio	S-Curve	
