= Fresh Eyes =

Single by Andy Grammer

from the album The Good Parts
- Released: July 29, 2016
- Recorded: 2016
- Genre: Pop
- Length: 3:18
- Label: S-Curve; Hollywood
- Songwriters: Andy Grammer; Ross Golan; Ian Kirkpatrick
- Producer: Ian Kirkpatrick

Andy Grammer singles chronology
| "Good to Be Alive (Hallelujah)" (2015) | "Fresh Eyes" (2016) | "Give Love" (2017) |

Music video
- "Fresh Eyes" on YouTube

"Fresh Eyes" is a song from American musician Andy Grammer, serving as the lead single from his third studio album The Good Parts. It was made available for digital download on July 29, 2016, through S-Curve Records. Grammer co-wrote the song with Ross Golan and Ian Kirkpatrick.

The song is a charity single with all proceeds going to the Union Rescue Mission in Los Angeles, a private Christian homeless shelter in downtown Los Angeles's Skid Row.

== Composition ==
"Fresh Eyes" is written in the key of G major with a tempo of 122 beats per minute. The song follows a chord progression of Em-D-G-C, and Grammer's vocals span from D_{4} to G_{5}.

== Music video ==
A music video was filmed in Los Angeles in September 2016 and launched on October 19, 2016. It documents Grammer's visit to Union Rescue Mission, where residents were given makeovers.

== Live performances ==
Grammer performed "Fresh Eyes" on The Today Show on August 1, 2016.

Grammer also performed “Fresh Eyes” on December 31, 2017, he also sang John Lennon’s Imagine, during the Times Square 2018 ball drop

== Charts ==
=== Weekly charts ===
| Chart (2016–2017) | Peak position |
|---|---|
| Australia (ARIA) | 5 |
| Austria (Ö3 Austria Top 40) | 60 |
| Belgium (Ultratip Bubbling Under Flanders) | 24 |
| Belgium (Ultratip Bubbling Under Wallonia) | 33 |
| Canada Hot 100 (Billboard) | 59 |
| Canada AC (Billboard) | 21 |
| Canada Hot AC (Billboard) | 37 |
| Czech Republic Airplay (ČNS IFPI) | 71 |
| Czech Republic Singles Digital (ČNS IFPI) | 36 |
| Germany (GfK) | 90 |
| Hungary (Rádiós Top 40) | 27 |
| Ireland (IRMA) | 30 |
| Italy (FIMI) | 43 |
| Netherlands (Single Top 100) | 42 |
| New Zealand (Recorded Music NZ) | 8 |
| Slovakia Airplay (ČNS IFPI) | 41 |
| Slovakia Singles Digital (ČNS IFPI) | 44 |
| Sweden (Sverigetopplistan) | 33 |
| UK Singles (OCC) | 50 |
| US Billboard Hot 100 | 59 |
| US Adult Contemporary (Billboard) | 20 |
| US Adult Pop Airplay (Billboard) | 9 |

=== Year-end charts ===
| Chart (2017) | Position |
|---|---|
| Australia (ARIA) | 46 |
| US Adult Top 40 (Billboard) | 41 |

== Certifications ==
| Region | Certification | Certified units/sales |
|---|---|---|
| Australia (ARIA) | 5× Platinum | 350,000^{‡} |
| Canada (Music Canada) | Platinum | 80,000^{‡} |
| Denmark (IFPI Danmark) | Gold | 45,000^{‡} |
| Italy (FIMI) | Platinum | 50,000^{‡} |
| New Zealand (RMNZ) | 4× Platinum | 120,000^{‡} |
| United Kingdom (BPI) | Gold | 400,000^{‡} |
| United States (RIAA) | 2× Platinum | 2,000,000^{‡} |
^{‡} Sales+streaming figures based on certification alone.

== Release history ==
| Country | Date | Format | Label | Ref. |
|---|---|---|---|---|
| Worldwide | July 29, 2016 | Digital download | S-Curve | |
| United States | August 15, 2016 | Hot AC radio | S-Curve; Hollywood | |
