= Fine by Me (Andy Grammer song) =

2011 single by Andy Grammer

Single by Andy Grammer

from the album Andy Grammer
- Released: December 2011
- Genre: Pop rock; soft rock
- Length: 2:53
- Label: S-Curve; Warner Bros (UK)
- Songwriter(s): Andy Grammer; Matt Radosevich
- Producer(s): Matt Radosevich

Andy Grammer singles chronology
"Keep Your Head Up" (2011)	"Fine by Me" (2011)	"Miss Me" (2012)

"Fine by Me" is the second single by American recording artist Andy Grammer from his debut studio album Andy Grammer (2011). The song was co-written and produced by Matt Radosevich. It was released in December 2011. "Fine by Me" debuted at #87 on the Billboard Hot 100 and reached the top 10 on the Adult Pop Songs chart. A live version was included on his live album, Live From L.A., featuring guest vocals from Colbie Caillat.

== Music video ==
The music video published for "Fine by Me" was released February 15, 2012. It depicts singer Andy Grammer ignoring his girlfriend, portrayed by model Dominique Piek but getting her back by recording his song on her iPod.

== Charts ==
=== Weekly charts ===
Chart (2011–12)	Peak position
Belgium (Ultratop 50 Flanders)	47
Netherlands (Single Top 100)	94
US Billboard Hot 100	84
US Adult Contemporary (Billboard)	30
US Adult Pop Airplay (Billboard)	10

=== Year-end charts ===
Chart (2012)	Position
US Adult Pop Songs (Billboard)	31

== Certifications ==
Region	Certification	Certified units/sales
New Zealand (RMNZ)	Gold	15,000^{‡}
United States (RIAA)	Platinum	1,000,000^{‡}
^{‡} Sales+streaming figures based on certification alone.
