= Keep Your Head Up (Andy Grammer song) =

2010 debut single by Andy Grammer

Single by Andy Grammer

from the album Andy Grammer
- Released: November 15, 2010
- Recorded: 2010
- Genre: Pop rock; soft rock
- Length: 3:10
- Label: S-Curve
- Songwriter: Andy Grammer
- Producers: Lion's Share; Steven Greenberg

Andy Grammer singles chronology
"Keep Your Head Up" (2010)	"Fine by Me" (2011)

"Keep Your Head Up" is the debut single by American recording artist Andy Grammer from his eponymous debut studio album Andy Grammer (2011). It was written by Grammer and produced by Lion's Share, with additional production by Steve Greenberg. The song was first released November 15, 2010 as the album's lead single. It debuted at number 94 on the Billboard Hot 100 and since then has reached number 53. The song was RIAA-certified Platinum, for sales of over 1 million downloads, in 2011. It also entered the charts in Australia, Belgium, Canada, the Netherlands and New Zealand. The song was released in the UK on March 12, 2012, but failed to chart.

Grammer also released a bilingual version of the song in France, alternatively titled "Relève la tête", featuring French singer Mélissa Nkonda. This version reached number 156 in France.

== Music video ==
The music video published for "Keep Your Head Up" was released on November 11, 2010. It depicts singer Andy Grammer in a variety of unfortunate or awkward situations but shrugging his problems off. It also features actor Rainn Wilson. An interactive video of "Keep Your Head Up" was made exclusively on Vevo. The interactive video was named "Most Innovative Video" of 2011 at the MTV O Music Awards. For reasons unknown, the VEVO video uploaded to YouTube was blocked in the United States in July 2020. It however came back to YouTube in August 2024.

== In other media ==
"Keep Your Head Up" is featured as the theme song for Tricky Business. It also appears in the movie Pitch Perfect.

He also sings this song on So Random!.

== Charts ==
=== Weekly charts ===
Chart (2011–12)	Peak position
Australia (ARIA)	53
Belgium (Ultratop 50 Flanders)	27
Belgium (Ultratip Bubbling Under Wallonia)	35
Canada Hot 100 (Billboard)	61
France (SNEP); French version featuring Mélissa Nkonda	156
Netherlands (Single Top 100)	94
New Zealand (Recorded Music NZ)	34
US Billboard Hot 100	53
US Adult Contemporary (Billboard)	11
US Adult Pop Airplay (Billboard)	5
US Pop Airplay (Billboard)	21

=== Year-end charts ===
Chart (2011)	Position
US Adult Contemporary (Billboard)	24
US Adult Pop Songs (Billboard)	14

== Certifications ==
Region	Certification	Certified units/sales
Australia (ARIA)	2× Platinum	140,000^{‡}
New Zealand (RMNZ)	2× Platinum	60,000^{‡}
United States (RIAA)	Platinum	1,000,000^{‡}
^{‡} Sales+streaming figures based on certification alone.

== Release history ==
Release dates and formats for "Keep Your Head Up"
Region	Date	Format	Label(s)	Ref.
United States	June 28, 2011	Mainstream airplay	S-Curve	
