= Andy Grammer (album) =

Studio album by Andy Grammer
- Released: June 14, 2011
- Recorded: 2010–11
- Genre: Pop rock; blue-eyed soul
- Length: 40:16
- Label: S-Curve Records
- Producer: Matt Wallace; Matt Radosevich; Adam Pallin

Andy Grammer chronology
Soft Lights on Bright Colors (2009)	Andy Grammer (2011)	Live from L.A. (2012)

Singles from Andy Grammer
- 1. "Keep Your Head Up" Released: November 15, 2010; 2. "Fine by Me" Released: December 2011; 3. "Miss Me" Released: September 8, 2012

Andy Grammer is the debut album from American recording artist Andy Grammer. It was released on June 14, 2011, via S-Curve Records. The album was preceded by the platinum-certified single "Keep Your Head Up", which was released on November 15, 2010.

It was produced by Matt Wallace (Maroon 5), Matt Radosevich, Dave Katz, and Sam Hollander (Gym Class Heroes), and peaked at #105 on the US Billboard 200 chart as well as #1 on the Billboard Heatseekers Albums chart.

== Background ==
Grammer was "fully involved in the creative process" of the album. He prefers to write songs on his own, but making the album allowed him to work with other writers as well.

== Singles ==
"Keep Your Head Up" was released in February 2011, and reached #53 on the Billboard Hot 100. The music video for the single gained considerable buzz due to a "Choose Your Own Adventure"-esque option with VEVO. The song was later certified platinum by RIAA. It was later featured in the 2012 film Pitch Perfect.

The album's second single was "Fine by Me" was released in December 2011, and peaked at #84 on the Billboard Hot 100 respectively. with the music video premiering in February 2012.

The third single "Miss Me" was released to Adult Contemporary stations only, with a music video premiering on September 8, 2012.

== Critical reception ==
Professional ratings
Review scores
Source	Rating
AllMusic	3.5/5 stars
Entertainment Weekly	B

AllMusic's William Ruhlman noted that the music lightly borrows from hip-hop music and has a rap music influence. He also said that Grammer's music leans toward a female audience, usually directing himself to a significant other and singing words of encouragement and affection. Entertainment Weekly's Tanner Stransky gave the album an overall B grade, stating that it sounded "like a mash-up of Jason Mraz, Michael Bublé, and John Legend. It's all easily listenable, if scarcely original."

== Track listing ==
No.	Title	Writer(s)	Producer(s)	Length
1.	"Keep Your Head Up"	Andy Grammer	Lion's Share; Steve Greenberg (add.)	3:10
2.	"Fine by Me"	Andy Grammer; Matt Radosevich	Matt Radosevich	2:52
3.	"Slow"	Andy Grammer; Barrett Yeretsian	Barrett Yeretsian	3:55
4.	"You Should Know Better"	Andy Grammer; Boots Ottestad	S*A*M and Sluggo; Adam Pallin (co.)	3:23
5.	"Lunatic"	Andy Grammer	S*A*M and Sluggo; Adam Pallin (co.)	3:03
6.	"Miss Me"	Andy Grammer; Boots Ottestad	S*A*M and Sluggo; Adam Pallin (co.)	3:41
7.	"The Pocket"	Andy Grammer	Lion's Share	3:53
8.	"Ladies"	Andy Grammer	Matt "T. Rex" Wallace	3:32
9.	"Love Love Love (Let You Go)"	Andy Grammer	Matt "T. Rex" Wallace	3:41
10.	"Build Me a Girl"	Andy Grammer; Jamie Hartman; Phil Bentley	Matt "T. Rex" Wallace	3:11
11.	"Biggest Man in Los Angeles"	Andy Grammer	Matt "T. Rex" Wallace	3:55

== Chart performance ==
Chart (2011)	Peak position
US Billboard 200	105
US Heatseekers Albums (Billboard)	1
