= Aijia Grammer =

American singer-songwriter (born 1986)

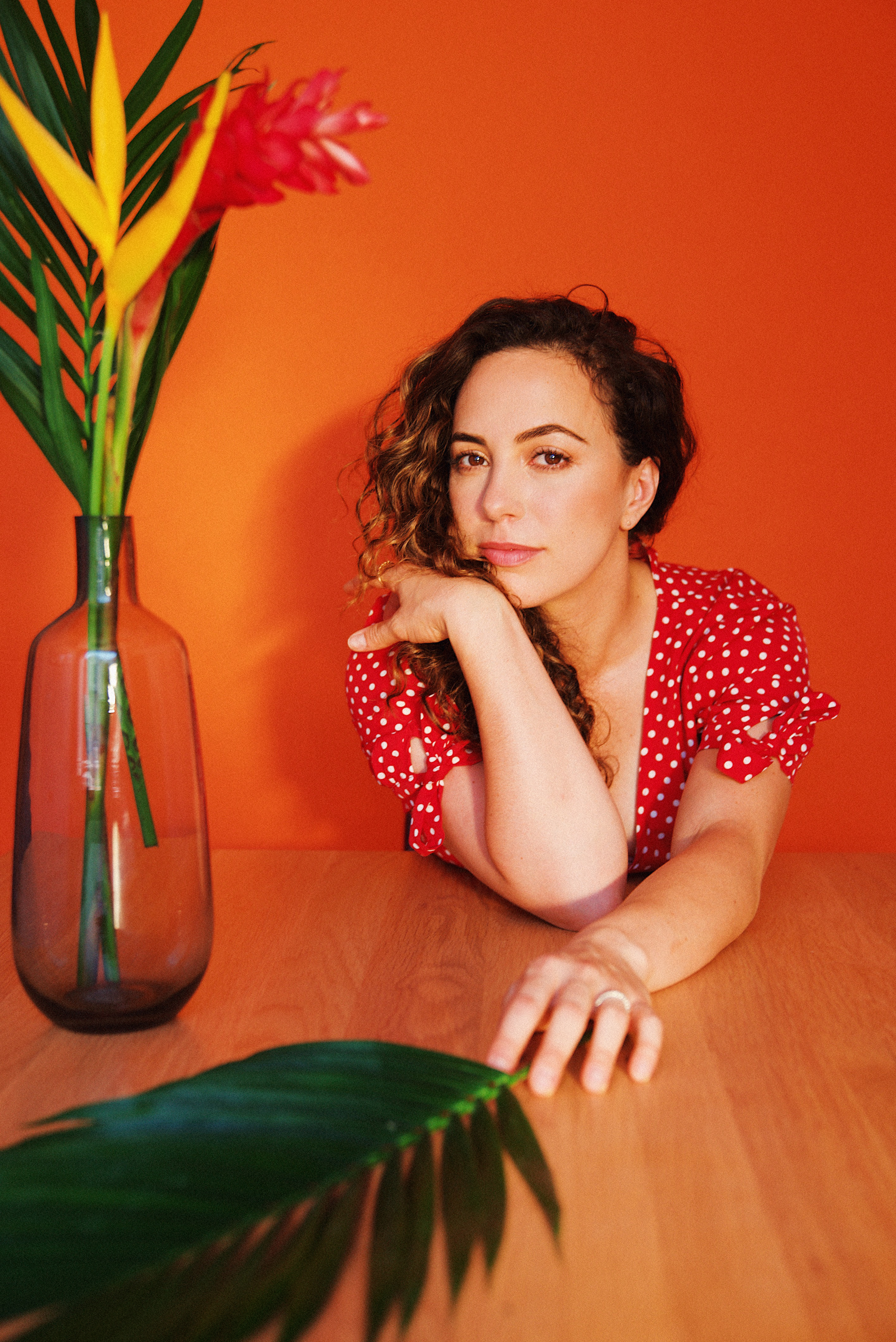

Background information
- Also known as: Aijia
- Born: Aijia Lise Guttman; June 26, 1986 (age 40)
- Origin: Los Angeles
- Genre: Pop
- Occupations: Singer, songwriter
- Instruments: Vocals, Piano, Keyboard
- Years active: 2012–present
- Spouse: Andy Grammer (m. 2012)
- Website: aijiamusic.com

Aijia Lise Grammer (née Guttman; born June 26, 1986) is an American singer and songwriter from Los Angeles. Her self-released EP under the title Learning to Let Go was released in 2012. She has worked as a touring singer for Selena Gomez, Colbie Caillat, Hilary Duff, Jack Black, and her husband Andy Grammer.

== Early life ==
Aijia Grammer was born Aijia Lise Guttman on June 26, 1986, in Los Angeles. She began taking part in choir shows and talent shows as a child. She is the maternal granddaughter of Helen Guttman, the former owner of Anti Club which was in Melrose Hill in Los Angeles. Anti Club hosted Red Hot Chili Peppers, System of a Down, Weezer, Faith No More, Sonic Youth, The Cult, and other bands.

Grammer's paternal grandfather was head of the Jazz Piano Dept at the University of Southern California. She is the paternal niece of E. G. Daily, a voiceover actress and fellow alumni of The Voice.

== Education ==
She graduated from California State University, Northridge majoring in jazz studies. While studying she began an internship at Warner Records working in publicity, marketing, and A&R.

== Personal life ==
She married recording artist Andy Grammer in July 2012 in Fullerton, California. They have two daughters, Louisiana K and Israel Blue.

Aijia Grammer met her husband at California State University, Northridge where they were both music students. They are both followers of the Baháʼí Faith.

== Musical career ==
She began teaching piano lessons to children, playing local gigs in Los Angeles, and writing music for commercials, trailers, and TV. She sang backing vocals for artists including Selena Gomez, Colbie Caillat, Hilary Duff, Jack Black, Rachel Platten and her husband Andy Grammer. In 2011, Aijia Grammer played for the U.S. troops on a USO tour throughout Iraq, Kuwait, Kosovo, and Germany. Performing with the name of Aijia, Grammer self-released her debut EP titled Learning to Let Go in 2012. It was followed in 2018 and 2019 by singles "For You" and "Magic," respectively.

She is an ambassador for the Los Angeles chapter of Rock and Roll Camp for Girls, a non-profit organization with the mission to be "a social justice organization empowering girls through music education." Other notable ambassadors include Sara Bareilles, Katy Perry, Andra Day, Patty Schemel, Shirley Manson and Keala Settle. Grammer cites Alicia Keys, Sia, and Amy Winehouse as being her influences. Grammer's preferred keyboard on stage is the Korg SV-1 88-Key Stage Vintage Piano.

== Entertainment industry career ==
She starred in a production of Andrew Lloyd Webber's, Jesus Christ Superstar in Hollywood, California in 2006. In 2010 she portrayed Angela in The Alliance Theater's production of Twist: An American Musical, staged by Debbie Allen. In the 2010s Grammer played roles in short films including Drew's 5th Birthday, Girls Night, and The First Step directed by Donnie Hobbie and Ally Zonsius, and Michael A. MacRae, respectively.

In 2016 Grammer appeared on Season 10 of The Voice. Her first feature-length appearance was as Kristin in Snare directed by Khu and Justin Price, also in 2016. In 2019, Grammer joined the casting department of Songland, a songwriting competition series, as a talent producer during its first season.

== Discography ==
=== As Aijia ===
==== Extended plays and singles ====
- Learning to Let Go (2012)

==== Singles ====
- "Magic" (2019)
- "For You" (2018)

=== Songwriting credits ===
==== Singles ====
- "Over Getting Over You" (2020) - performed by Molly Moore
- "Black Halo" - written with Josh Doyle and Josh Nyback
- "Did It To Myself" - written with Doyle and Evan Hillhouse
- "Coming For You" - written with Josh Tangney and Andre De Santanna
- "Just Gettin Started" - written with Doyle and Nyback
- "Love Is What Happens" - written with Dayyon Alexander and Ryan Beatty
- "Time of Our Lives" - written with Doyle and Nyback
- "Trouble" - written with Doyle and Nyback
- "When I'm With You" - written with Tangney and Andre De Santanna
- "Whenever Whatever" - written with Doyle and Nyback
- "Woman Scorned" - written with Doyle and Nyback

== Filmography ==
=== Film ===
Year	Title	Role	Notes
2013	Drew's 5th Birthday	Kelly	Short
2015	Girls Night	Carmen	Short
2015	An Epic Sunday Run	Self	Short
2016	The First Step	Woman	Short
2016	Snare	Kristin	

=== Television ===
Year	Title	Role	Notes
2014	Live with Kelly and Ryan	Self	Musical guest
2016	The Voice	Self	
2019	Songland	Self	as a talent producer

=== Music videos ===
Year	Title
2013	"Good Cry"
2013	"Learning To Let Go"
2018	"For You"
2013	"Magic"
