= Don't Give Up on Me (Andy Grammer song) =

2019 single by Andy Grammer

- Cover art for the R3hab remix

Single by Andy Grammer

from the album Naive
- Released: February 13, 2019
- Length: 3:16
- Label: S-Curve
- Songwriters: Andy Grammer; Bram Inscore; Jake Torrey; Sam Farrar
- Producer: Bram Inscore

Andy Grammer singles chronology
"Smoke Clears" (2017)	"Don't Give Up on Me" (2019)	"I Am Yours" (2019)

R3hab singles chronology
"All Around the World (La La La)" (2019)	"Don't Give Up on Me" (2019)	"Don't Give Up on Me Now" (2019)

Music video
- "Don't Give Up on Me" on YouTube

"Don't Give Up on Me" is a song by American singer-songwriter Andy Grammer. It was released on February 13, 2019 as lead single from his fourth studio album, Naive which was released on June 25, 2019. Grammer wrote the song with Bram Inscore, Jake Torrey and Sam Farrar; Inscore produced it. On April 12, 2019, Grammer released another version with Dutch DJ R3hab.

== Content ==
"Don't Give Up on Me" is the theme song of 2019 romantic drama film Five Feet Apart. It is about a young man and woman living in the entanglement of illness, death and love. The lyrics speaks to the heroine's mission and echo the sentiment of her. Grammer said in an interview, "'Don't give up on me'… a very simple idea but a very powerful one. I have had many moments in my life where I wouldn't give up on someone else, where I believed in them when they didn't believe in themselves. Hell, I've had super intense moments where I wouldn't give up on myself. But the most powerful memories from my personal vantage point are when someone wouldn't give up on me. It is my sincere wish that for anyone who hears this song and is on the verge of giving up it will be another subtle nudge to keep going."

== Composition ==
The song is written in the key of C minor and has a tempo of 113 beats per minute. The version with R3hab is written in the key of E♭ Major, with a tempo of 121 beats per minute.

In January 2020, Grammer recorded a new version with Jerusalem Youth Chorus.

== Charts ==
=== Weekly charts ===
Weekly chart performance for "Don't Give Up on Me"
Chart (2019)	Peak position
Australia (ARIA) With R3hab	49
Canada Hot 100 (Billboard)	87
Canada AC (Billboard)	34
Canada Hot AC (Billboard)	48
Hungary (Single Top 40)	25
Ireland (IRMA)	68
New Zealand Hot Singles (RMNZ)	37
US Bubbling Under Hot 100 (Billboard)	1
US Adult Pop Airplay (Billboard)	12

=== Year-end charts ===
2019 Year-end chart performance for "Don't Give Up on Me"
Chart (2019)	Position
US Adult Top 40 (Billboard)	33

== Certifications ==
Certifications for "Don't Give Up on Me"
Region	Certification	Certified units/sales
Australia (ARIA)	3× Platinum	210,000^{‡}
Brazil (Pro-Música Brasil)	3× Platinum	120,000^{‡}
Denmark (IFPI Danmark)	Gold	45,000^{‡}
France (SNEP)	Gold	100,000^{‡}
New Zealand (RMNZ)	2× Platinum	60,000^{‡}
Norway (IFPI Norway)	Platinum	60,000^{‡}
Portugal (AFP)	Gold	5,000^{‡}
Spain (Promusicae)	Gold	30,000^{‡}
United Kingdom (BPI)	Platinum	600,000^{‡}
United States (RIAA)	2× Platinum	2,000,000^{‡}
Streaming
Sweden (GLF)	Gold	4,000,000^{†}
^{‡} Sales+streaming figures based on certification alone.^{†} Streaming-only figures based on certification alone.

== Release history ==
Release history for "Don't Give Up on Me"
Region	Date	Format	Label	Version	Ref.
Various	February 13, 2019	Digital download; streaming	S-Curve	Original	
United States	March 11, 2019	Adult contemporary radio	S-Curve; Hollywood	Original	
Various	April 12, 2019	Digital download; streaming	S-Curve	R3hab remix	
