= The Good Parts =

Studio album by Andy Grammer
- Released: December 1, 2017
- Length: 42:28
- Label: BMG Rights Management; S-Curve

Andy Grammer chronology
Spotify Singles (2017)	The Good Parts (2017)	Naive (2019)

Singles from The Good Parts
- 1. "Fresh Eyes" Released: July 29, 2016; 2. "Give Love" Released: June 9, 2017; 3. "Smoke Clears" Released: November 3, 2017

The Good Parts is the third studio album by American recording artist Andy Grammer, released on December 1, 2017, through BMG Rights Management and S-Curve Records. It includes the single "Fresh Eyes", which peaked at number 59 on the Billboard Hot 100.

== Background ==
In an interview with Billboard, Grammer confirmed that 115 songs had been written for the album, and that "This is the first time I'm going to release an album that all the way down in my deepest self - and as a people pleaser, this is a really crazy to say - I don't care if you like it. To actually believe that when I say that... what a different place to be at as a 33-year-old artist." He discussed the title track with PopCrush; "about sharing your true story with people and really wanting to get to the place where you could honestly share those unfiltered parts."

== Promotion ==
On December 10, 2017, Grammer announced a 22-city tour to promote the album in 2018, beginning on March 14 at The Fillmore in San Francisco and finishing on April 15 at Philadelphia's Theatre of Living Arts. On June 25 of that year, Grammer announced a second leg of his tour, starting on September 28 at St. Petersburg's State Theatre and ending on November 14 at Houston's House of Blues.

== Track listing ==
No.	Title	Writer(s)	Length
1.	"Smoke Clears"	Grammer; Jarrad Rogers; Nolan Sipe	2:57
2.	"Freeze"	Grammer; Jesse St John; Yik Nam Jason Wu	3:06
3.	"The Good Parts"	Grammer; Alexander Evert; Sam Fischer; Alexander Tirheimer	3:39
4.	"Spaceship"	Grammer; Sean Douglas; Ian Kirkpatrick	3:00
5.	"Fresh Eyes"	Grammer; Ross Golan; Kirkpatrick	3:18
6.	"85"	Grammer; Brett McLaughlin; Kyle Moorman	3:21
7.	"Always"	Grammer; Alexander Evert; Alexander Tirheimer; Nate Cyphert; Nick Ruth	3:01
8.	"Workin' on It"	Grammer; McLaughlin; Daniel Omelio	3:34
9.	"Grown Ass Man Child"	Grammer; Trevor David Brown; Warren Felder; David Hodges	3:08
10.	"This Ain't Love"	Grammer; Omelio; Felder; Mike Eyal Aljadeff; Jordan Patrick Humphrey; Jordan Richard Palmer	3:25
11.	"Civil War"	Grammer	3:25
12.	"Grow"	Grammer; Emanuel Kiriakou; Clarence Coffee Jr.	3:07
13.	"Give Love" (featuring LunchMoney Lewis)	Grammer; Jeffrey David Goldford; Gamal Lewis; Stefan Litrownik	3:27

== Charts ==
Chart (2017)	Peak position
US Billboard 200	57

== Certifications ==
Region	Certification	Certified units/sales
New Zealand (RMNZ)	Gold	7,500^{‡}
^{‡} Sales+streaming figures based on certification alone.
