= Naive (Andy Grammer album) =

Studio album by Andy Grammer
- Released: July 26, 2019
- Length: 40:14
- Label: S-Curve

Andy Grammer chronology
The Good Parts (2017)	Naive (2019)

Singles from Naive
- 1. "Don't Give Up on Me" Released: February 13, 2019; 2. "I Am Yours" Released: June 28, 2019; 3. "Some Girl" Released: June 28, 2019; 4. "Wish You Pain" Released: September 23, 2019; 5. "Best of You" Released: February 7, 2020

Naive is the fourth studio album by American singer Andy Grammer, released through S-Curve Records on July 26, 2019. It includes the lead single, "Don't Give Up on Me".

== Background ==
In an interview with People, Grammer provided information on the album and its tracks, including "She'd Say", which was described as "a touching song about what his mom would say to his daughter if she were still alive." "It's really sweet, it's one of my favorites," Grammer explained, adding that "the whole song is about little pieces of advice, like 'You're beautiful, but don't overplay that card' or 'You're spiritual, so don't forget that part.'"

== Track listing ==
No.	Title	Writer(s)	Producer(s)	Length
1.	"My Own Hero"	Andrew Grammer; Nick Ruth; Michael Matosic; Michael Pollack	Ruth	3:29
2.	"I Found You"	Grammer; Jon Levine; Nolan Sipe; Will Lobban-Bean	Levine	2:31
3.	"Some Girl"	Grammer; Johan Carlsson; Jake Torrey	Carlsson	2:55
4.	"Wish You Pain"	Grammer; Ryan Metzger; Jack Metzger; Tom Meredith	R. Metzger; Meredith	3:47
5.	"Don't Give Up on Me"	Grammer; Bram Inscore; Torrey; Sam Farrar	Inscore	3:16
6.	"She'd Say" (with Ladysmith Black Mambazo)	Grammer; Emily Haber; Yik Nam Jason Wu	Jamey Heath; Rabbit	3:26
7.	"I Am Yours"	Grammer; Carlsson; Sean Douglas	Carlsson	3:41
8.	"Spotlight" (featuring Andy Mineo and Swoope)	Grammer; Levine; Brett McLaughlin	Levine	3:04
9.	"First Time"	Grammer; Mike Eyal Aljadeff; Jason Wu	Rabbit	2:39
10.	"Stay There"	Grammer; Jayson DeZuzio; Sipe	DeZuzio; Alexander Tirheimer; Mads	2:36
11.	"Born for This"	Grammer; Daniel Omelio; Sipe	Robopop	3:04
12.	"Best of You"	Grammer; Carlsson; Torrey; Steve James	Carlsson	3:06
13.	"Naive"	Grammer	Heath	2:40
Total length:				40:14

== Charts ==
Chart (2019)	Peak position
Australian Digital Albums (ARIA)	33
US Billboard 200	29

== Certifications ==
Region	Certification	Certified units/sales
New Zealand (RMNZ)	Gold	7,500^{‡}
^{‡} Sales+streaming figures based on certification alone.
