= Andy Grammer =

American singer-songwriter (born 1983)

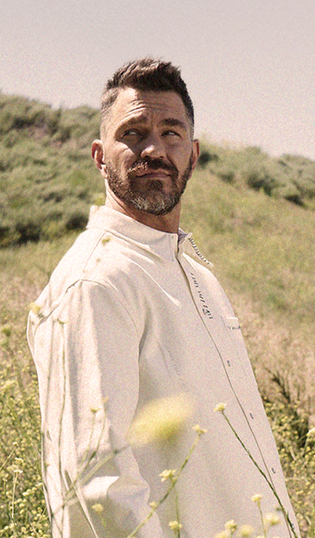
- Grammer in 2025
- Born: Andrew Charles Grammer; December 3, 1983 (age 42); Los Angeles, California, U.S.
- Occupations: Singer; songwriter; record producer
- Years active: 2007–present
- Spouse: Aijia Guttman (m. 2012)
- Children: 3
- Musical career
- Genres: Pop rock; soul; pop; country pop
- Instruments: Vocals; guitar; piano; trumpet
- Labels: S-Curve, Mushroom Music Publishing
- Website: andygrammer.com

Andrew Charles Grammer (born December 3, 1983) is an American singer, songwriter, and record producer. He has been signed to Mushroom Music Publishing since March 2022.

His debut album, Andy Grammer, was released in 2011 and spawned the singles "Keep Your Head Up" and "Fine by Me". His second album Magazines or Novels was released in 2014, and featured "Honey, I'm Good" which is his most successful song to date, peaking at number 9 on the Billboard Hot 100, certified triple-platinum by the Recording Industry Association of America (RIAA), and ranked one of the ten best-selling songs of 2015 by Nielsen SoundScan. The album also featured the certified gold single "Good to Be Alive (Hallelujah)". In 2026, Grammer released his sixth studio album, Big Stupid Heart.

== Early life ==
Andrew Charles Grammer was born in Los Angeles, the son of Kathryn Willoughby and recording artist Robert Crane "Red" Grammer. He is of German and English descent. He grew up in Chester, New York and graduated from Monroe-Woodbury High School. As a child, he learned to play the trumpet and later the guitar and piano. He began writing songs at 15. At 20, he left Binghamton University in Vestal, New York, and returned to Los Angeles, where he currently resides. In 2007, he graduated from California State University, Northridge, with a B.A. in music industry studies.

== Musical career ==
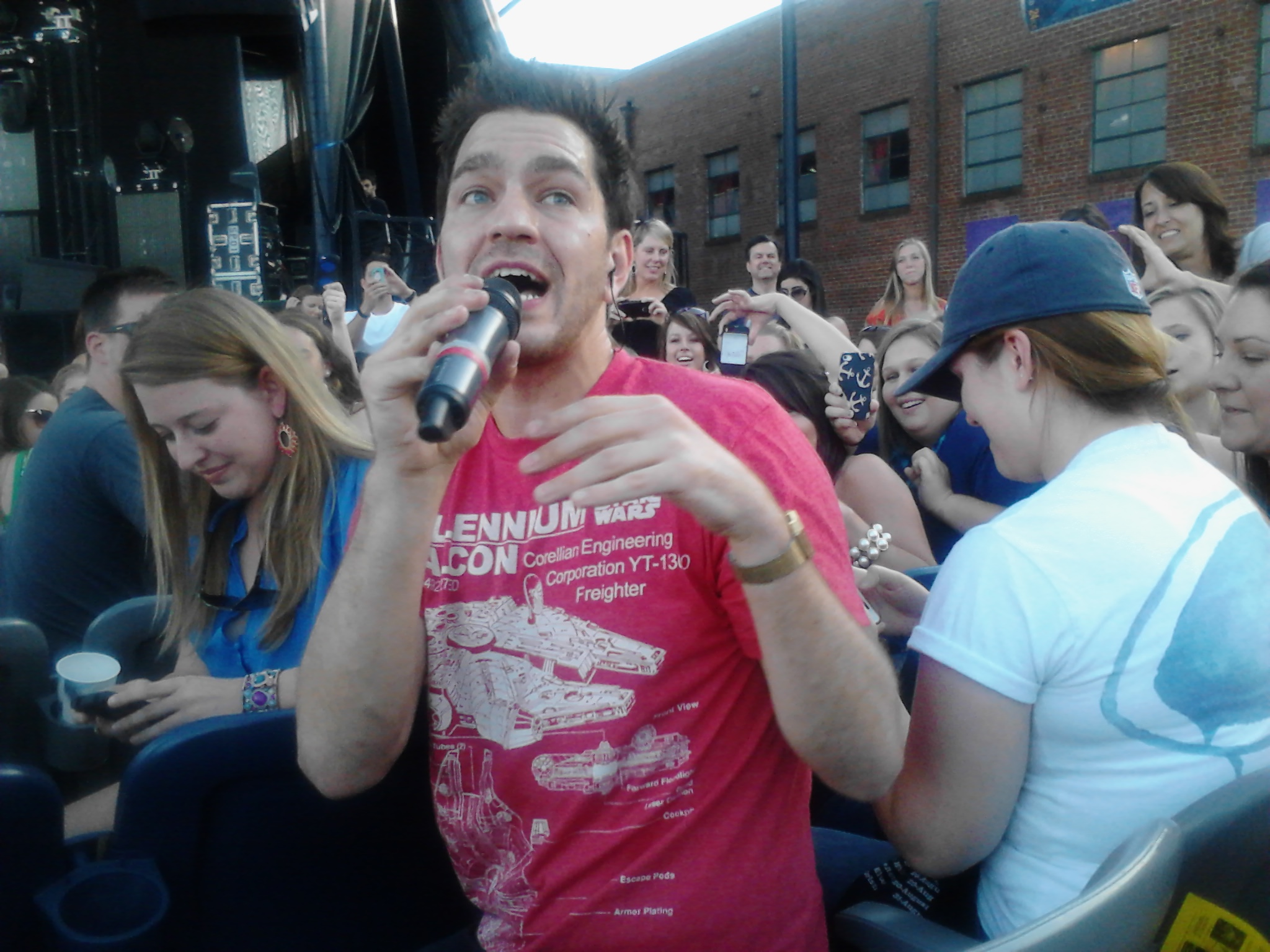
Grammer performing in Charlotte, North Carolina, June 2012

Grammer started as a busker on the Third Street Promenade in Santa Monica. He was discovered by his manager Ben Singer in July 2009 and signed with S-Curve Records in April 2010. Grammer's popular songs include: "Honey, I'm Good.", "Keep Your Head Up", "Fine by Me", "Fresh Eyes", "Good to Be Alive (Hallelujah)", and "Don't Give Up on Me".

His debut video "Keep Your Head Up", which featured actor Rainn Wilson, was an iTunes Video of the Week in 2010, and won MTV's "O Music Awards" for the most innovative video on April 25, 2011. He performed the song on The Rachael Ray Show on November 17, 2010. It has since debuted at No. 94 on the Billboard Hot 100 Grammer's debut album sales for the first week earned him the No. 1 spot on the Billboard Heatseekers Albums Chart. He opened for Plain White T's for the second leg of their "Wonders of the Younger" tour in the spring of 2011. In January 2011, he was named an "Artist to Watch" by Billboard magazine. He performed at SXSW 2011, playing BMI's Acoustic Brunch, where he was one of the artists contributing to a recording produced by Hanson to benefit the victims of the 2011 Japan earthquake.

Grammer credits his music influences to three genres of music: guitar players like Jason Mraz, John Mayer and Jack Johnson; modern bands like Coldplay, The Fray, and OneRepublic; and hip-hop vocalists like Common, Lauryn Hill, Jay-Z, and Kanye West.

=== 2011–2013: Andy Grammer ===
His debut album, Andy Grammer, was released on June 14, 2011, on S-Curve Records. The self-titled album was produced by Matt Wallace from Maroon 5, Matt Radosevich, Dave Katz, and Sam Hollander of Gym Class Heroes.

On the new album, Grammer said:

My ultimate goal is to try to be real. It just so happens that I'm usually more happy than sad when I'm writing. And in general I think that life is pretty great, and it's cool to be here, so that comes through in my music. I don't have a dismal outlook, but I don't aim to make positive music. It's just what I am.

He joined Natasha Bedingfield on her Less is More Tour, which began June 2011, and Colbie Caillat on her US and Canada tour, which began August 2011. The Grammy Museum, in Los Angeles, featured him in the first installment of its homegrown local artist series starting in May 2011.

=== 2014–2016: Magazines or Novels ===
On March 25, 2014, he debuted "Back Home", the lead single from his second album, Magazines or Novels. The song, co-written with Ryan Met from the group AJR, was released to iTunes on April 8, 2014. The album was released August 5, 2014.

On November 11, 2014, he released his biggest single to date, "Honey, I'm Good." which peaked at #9 on the Billboard Hot 100, and was certified triple-platinum by the RIAA.

On August 31, 2015, he was announced as one of the celebrities who would compete on the 21st season of Dancing with the Stars. He was paired with professional dancer Peta Murgatroyd until an ankle injury forced her to withdraw. His new partner was Allison Holker. Grammer and Holker were eliminated on Week 8 of competition and finished in 7th place.

In addition to his stint on the show, he released a new single "Good to Be Alive (Hallelujah)" on August 24, which was another gold-certified hit for him, and was included on a re-issued deluxe version of his Magazines or Novels album.

On October 27, 2015, he performed the National Anthem prior to the start of the opening game of the World Series between the Kansas City Royals and the New York Mets at Kauffman Stadium in Kansas City. In January 2016, he performed an a cappella version of "The Star-Spangled Banner" at the Denver Broncos–New England Patriots AFC Championship Game in Denver.

=== 2016–present: The Good Parts, Naive, and Monster ===
On July 29, 2016, Grammer released a new single titled "Fresh Eyes", which was another platinum hit for him that reach #19 on the Spotify Global Viral 50 Chart.

On June 9, 2017, Grammer released his new single featuring LunchMoney Lewis titled "Give Love". Grammer also wrote and performed the song "A Friend Like You" for the animated film Captain Underpants: The First Epic Movie.

The third single from his album The Good Parts, titled "Smoke Clears", was released on November 3, 2017. The album was released on December 1, 2017.

On February 21, 2019, Grammer released his new single, "Don't Give Up On Me", from the soundtrack of the film Five Feet Apart. It is also the lead single from his fourth studio album, Naive, which was released on July 26, 2019.

In March 2022, Grammer announced he had signed with Mushroom Publishing.

In 2024, he announced his upcoming fifth studio album, his first in nearly five years, titled Monster, which was released on October 4, 2024.

In 2025, Grammer competed in season thirteen of The Masked Singer as "Boogie Woogie" which resembled a hairy orange monster in disco clothes. He finished in second place and did an encore of "Don't Give Up on Me".

In June 2026, Grammar announced Greater Than Pt. II: A One Man Show, which will begin on November 3, 2026, in New Hampshire, reprising his 2025 Greater Than: A One Man Show concert series. This will follow his Big Stupid Hearts tour, which will begin on July 25, 2026. On July 10, 2026, he released the single "Best Hearts", ahead of his sixth studio album, Big Stupid Heart, released on October 16, 2026.

== Personal life ==
While at college, Grammer met Aijia Guttman, whom he would marry in July 2012 in Fullerton, California. He and Aijia have three daughters, born in 2017, 2020, and 2026.

Grammer and Aijia adhere to the Baháʼí Faith. He meditates, and memorizes and recites Baháʼí prayers. Grammer finds that being outside and going on walks, hikes, or runs has many mental health benefits. When he is stressed, he visualizes zooming out and seeing himself as a soul in the Baháʼí context.

== Discography ==
- Andy Grammer (2011)
- Magazines or Novels (2014)
- The Good Parts (2017)
- Naive (2019)
- Monster (2024)
- Big Stupid Heart (2026)

== Filmography ==
Grammer made a guest appearance on the Disney Channel series Liv and Maddie in the episode "SPARF-a-Rooney", performing the song "Honey, I'm Good."

== Songwriting credits ==
Grammer also co-wrote Galantis's single "Bones" (featuring OneRepublic).
