= Play (MiSaMo album) =

- Digital and standard edition cover

Studio album by MiSaMo
- Released: February 4, 2026
- Genre: J-pop
- Length: 34:31
- Language: Japanese; English
- Label: Warner Japan

MiSaMo chronology
Haute Couture (2024)	Play (2026)

Singles from Play
- 1. "Confetti" Released: January 16, 2026

Play is the debut studio album by MiSaMo, a sub-unit of girl group Twice. It was released by Warner Music Japan on February 4, 2026. The album contains twelve tracks, including the lead single "Confetti" and previously released singles "Identity", "Do Not Touch", and "Message".

== Background and release ==
On November 22, 2025, JYP Entertainment announced that MiSaMo would release their first studio album on February 4, 2026. Play concludes the trilogy that began with Masterpiece in July 2023 and continued with Haute Couture in November 2024. Promotional material for the album stated that "Play marks the final act of MiSaMo's artistic triptych — a performative culmination where the artist transcends the artwork itself." The album's cover artwork and track listing were revealed on November 28, 2025. The lead single, "Confetti", was released on January 16, 2026, along with a music video. A highlight medley video previewing some of the album tracks was released on January 26. In this video, MiSaMo perform their solo songs during a fictional audition, with actor Takeru Satoh playing the host.

== Songs ==
The opening track, "Confetti", is an energetic song with a big band and jazz sound. Its lyrics are about "continuing forward even when life doesn't go as planned", calling life an "unscripted improvisation". "Hmm" is an R&B track that switches to a jazz arrangement near the end of the song, while "Not a Goodbye" is in the bedroom pop genre. "Deep Eden" is a "mysterious"-sounding song with a trap beat and various instruments including guitar, strings, and marimba. "Red Diamond" and "Catch My Eye" were first performed during MiSaMo's Haute Couture dome tour in 2024–2025, and the latter is a mix of Dixieland jazz, house, and hip-hop.

Momo chose her solo track, "Kitty", because it "sounded cool and a little kitschy" and she "thought it'd be fun to bring in something cute". Sana's solo "Ma Cherry" is an upbeat pop song with 1980s and 1990s hip-hop elements, and she chose it because she could "visualize the stage and performance really clearly". Mina chose "Turning Tables" as her solo because it "feels hip and cool". "Identity" and "Do Not Touch" are the lead singles of the group's first two EPs, Haute Couture and Masterpiece, respectively. The closing track, "Message", is a mid-tempo ballad that was previously featured as the theme song of the film Blank Canvas: My So-Called Artist's Journey (2025).

== Promotion ==
To promote the album, MiSaMo held a special event called "Uni Spring x MiSaMo Special Prom Night" at Universal Studios Japan on February 6, 2026. They performed "Confetti" for the first time at the event. They also held a pop-up event in Harajuku called "MiSaMo 1st Listening Party 'Play'" on February 7. That same day, Tokyo Tower was lit in MiSaMo's official colors to commemorate the album's release.

== Commercial performance ==
Play debuted at number 1 on both the Oricon Combined Albums Chart and Oricon Albums Chart, with 80,550 physical copies sold from February 2–8. That same week, the album topped the Billboard Japan Hot Albums chart, with 101,371 CD sales and 862 downloads.

== Track listing ==
Play – standard edition track listing
No.	Title	Lyrics	Music	Arrangement	Length
1.	"Confetti"	Elvyn (No Theory)	Heggy; Se.A; Lee Seung Hoon; Woobin (Fab); Deneb (Artiffect)	Lee; Woobin; Deneb	2:39
2.	"Hmm"	Masami Kakinuma (Relic Lyric)	C'SA; Parkhyeon	Parkhyeon	3:13
3.	"Not a Goodbye"	Elvyn	C'SA; Ish Hokhmah	Hokhmah	3:27
4.	"Deep Eden"	Kakinuma	Uta	Uta	2:50
5.	"Red Diamond"	Hiyori Nara	Awa; Gustav Blomberg	Blomberg	2:18
6.	"Catch My Eye"	Yui Kimura	Alysa; JJean; Andy Love	Alysa	3:14
7.	"Kitty" (Momo solo)	Elvyn	BXN; Keebomb	BXN	2:43
8.	"Ma Cherry" (Sana solo)	Rose Blueming	Em Walcott; Jonna Hall; Live Rabo Lund-Roland; Gustav Nyström; Simon Klose	Nyström; Klose	1:49
9.	"Turning Tables" (Mina solo)	Sofia Vivere; Yu-ki Kokubo	Scott Russell Stoddart; Anna Timgren; Alexei Viktorovitch	Stoddart	2:48
10.	"Identity"	J.Y. Park "The Asiansoul"; 4Season (153/Joombas); Kakinuma	Wilhelmina; Willow Kayne; Jacob Attwooll	Attwooll	2:20
11.	"Do Not Touch"	J.Y. Park; Mayu Wakisaka	Hyuk Shin (153/Joombas); Ashley Alisha (153/Joombas); MRey (153/Joombas)	MRey	3:05
12.	"Message"	Yago; Miri	Yumika Kondo; Tsingtao; Ryo Ito	Tsingtao	4:05
Total length:					34:31

Limited edition A DVD
No.	Title	Length
1.	"Do Not Touch" (Music Video)
2.	"New Look" (Music Video)
3.	"Identity" (Music Video)
4.	"Haute Couture" (Trailer Prologue – MiSaMo's Atelier)
5.	"Haute Couture" (Trailer Epilogue – MiSaMo's Backstage)
6.	"Haute Couture" (Trailer Making Movie)
7.	"New Look" (Music Video Making Movie)
8.	"Identity" (Music Video Making Movie)
9.	"Play" (Jacket Shooting Making Movie)
10.	"Play" (Jacket Self-Making Movie)

== Charts ==
=== Weekly charts ===
Weekly chart performance for Play
Chart (2026)	Peak position
Japanese Albums (Oricon)	1
Japanese Combined Albums (Oricon)	1
Japanese Hot Albums (Billboard Japan)	1

=== Monthly charts ===
Monthly chart performance for Play
Chart (2026)	Position
Japanese Albums (Oricon)	4

== Certifications ==
Certifications for Play
Region	Certification	Certified units/sales
Japan (RIAJ)	Gold	100,000^{^}
^{^} Shipments figures based on certification alone.
