= Jeongyeon =

South Korean singer (born 1996)

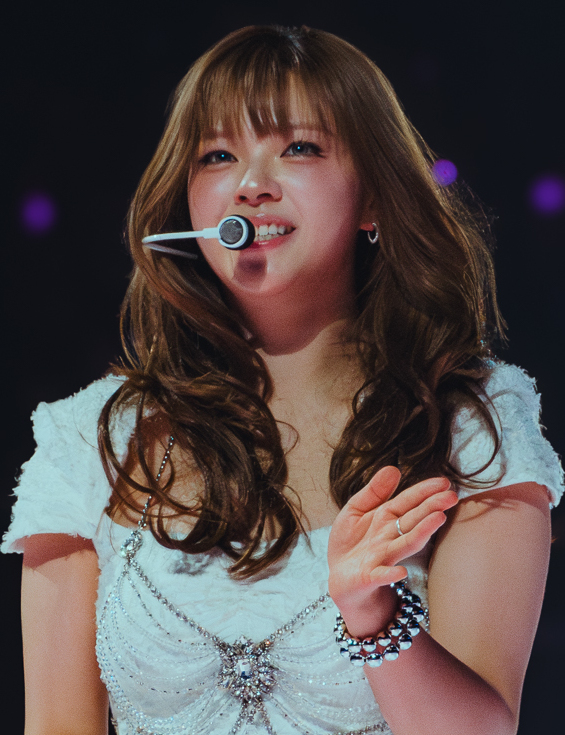
- Jeongyeon in 2026
- Born: Yu Kyung-wan; 1 November 1996 (age 30); Suwon, Gyeonggi, South Korea
- Occupation: Singer
- Agent: Varo Entertainment
- Relatives: Gong Seung-yeon (sister)
- Musical career
- Genres: K-pop; J-pop
- Instrument: Vocals
- Years active: 2015–present
- Labels: JYP; Warner Japan; Republic
- Member of: Twice

Korean name
- Hangul: 유정연
- RR: Yu Jeongyeon
- MR: Yu Chŏngyŏn

Former name
- Hangul: 유경완
- RR: Yu Gyeongwan
- MR: Yu Kyŏngwan

Yu Jeong-yeon (Korean: 유정연; born 1 November 1996), known mononymously as Jeongyeon, is a South Korean singer. She is a member of Twice, a South Korean girl group formed by JYP Entertainment.

== Early life ==
Jeongyeon was born as Yu Kyung-wan on 1 November 1996 in Suwon, Gyeonggi Province, South Korea. She has two older sisters, one of whom is the actress Gong Seung-yeon. Her father was a chef who worked for Kim Dae-jung, a former president of South Korea. Jeongyeon took aerobics classes at a young age and developed an interest in singing and dancing soon afterward.

== Career ==
=== Pre-debut ===
Jeongyeon failed an audition to join JYP Entertainment as a child, but eventually joined the agency after passing an audition in 2010. She trained for five years before debuting with Twice. In 2014, Jeongyeon was expected to become a member of a new JYP girl group alongside fellow trainees (now Twice bandmates) Nayeon, Sana, and Jihyo; however, the project was cancelled. In 2015, Jeongyeon participated in the television program Sixteen, a reality television competition to determine the members of Twice. In the final episode, she was chosen as one of the nine members of the group.

=== Debut with Twice and solo activities ===
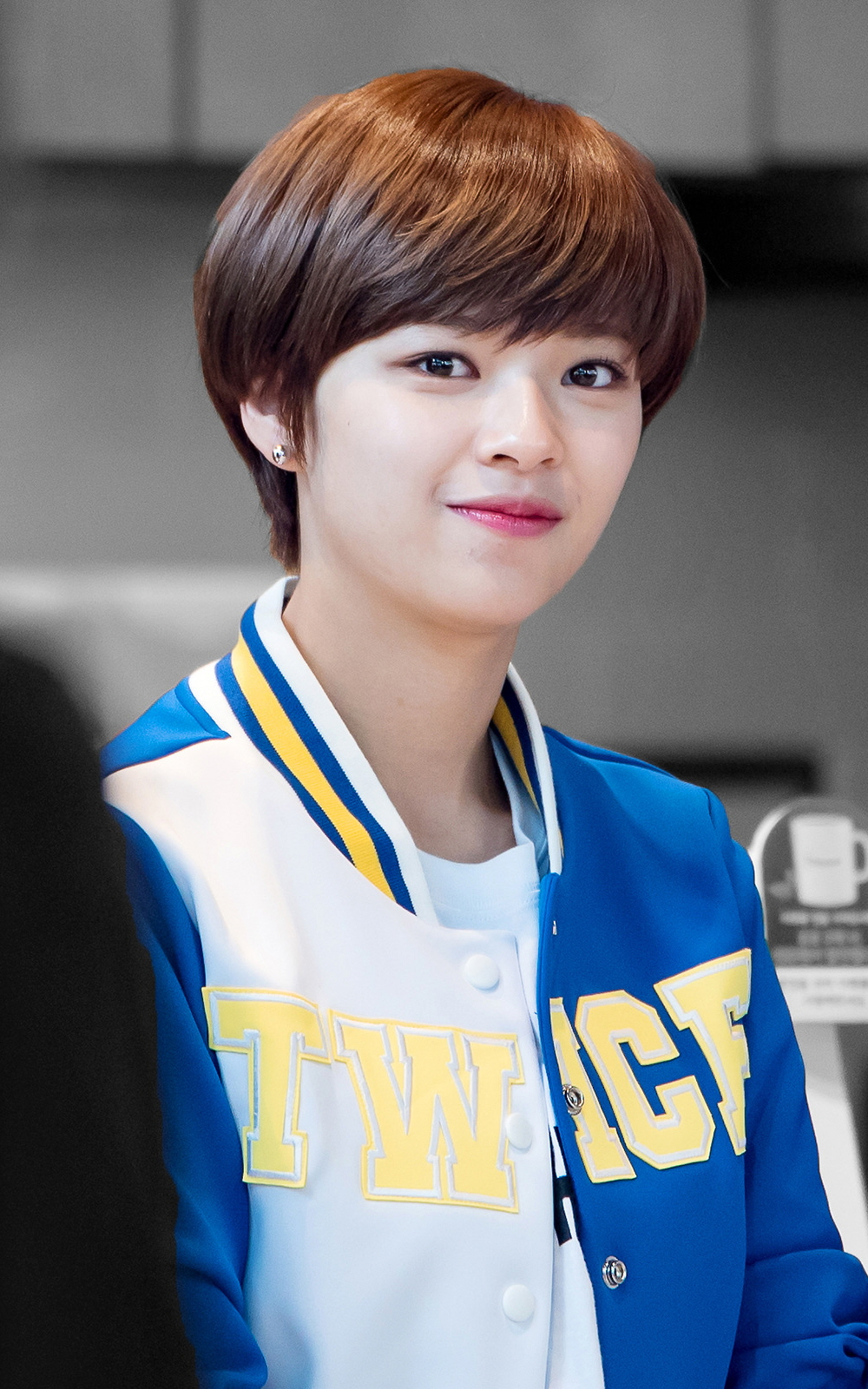
Jeongyeon in 2016

In October 2015, Jeongyeon officially debuted as a member of Twice with the release of their first extended play (EP), The Story Begins and its lead single "Like Ooh-Ahh". Jeongyeon and her sister co-hosted the South Korean music program Inkigayo from July 2016 to January 2017, for which they both won the Newcomer Award at the 2016 SBS Entertainment Awards. Since Jeongyeon's debut, she has also been credited as songwriter on some of Twice's tracks. In Gallup Korea's annual music poll, Jeongyeon was voted among the top 20 most popular idols in South Korea for four consecutive years from 2016 to 2019 alongside her bandmate Nayeon.

Jeongyeon was diagnosed with spinal disc herniation in 2020, and underwent disc surgery a week before the release of More & More. She was subsequently diagnosed with Cushing's syndrome as a side effect of steroid medication taken during treatment. On 17 October 2020, JYP Entertainment announced that Jeongyeon would be taking a hiatus due to anxiety. She resumed activities on 31 January 2021 at the 30th Seoul Music Awards. On 18 August 2021, JYP Entertainment announced that Jeongyeon would be taking a second hiatus due to panic and anxiety disorder. She resumed activities as a member of the group in February 2022, beginning with the North American leg of Twice 4th World Tour "III". That same year, Jeongyeon and the rest of the members renewed their contracts with JYP Entertainment.

On 1 November 2023, Jeongyeon released a cover of "O Christmas Tree" as part of Apple Music's Carols Covered playlist.

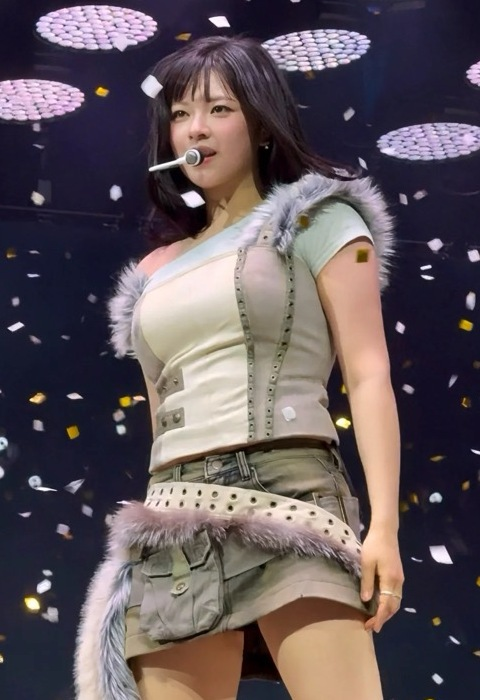
Jeongyeon in 2025 during the This Is For World Tour

In July 2024, Jeongyeon became the host of YouTube talk show Inspector (감별사). During the show she interviewed celebrities and invited them to donate items to be auctioned off for charity. The second season concluded in July 2025, with the show donating ₩30 million (US$22,383.45) to ChildFund Korea. That same month, it was announced that Jeongyeon would be making her acting debut in the film New Recruit: The Movie, a spin-off of the television series New Recruit.

On 20 June 2025, Jeongyeon along with fellow members Jihyo and Chaeyoung released "Takedown", the lead single of the Netflix animated musical fantasy film KPop Demon Hunters. As the film garnered critical acclaim and became a global sensation, the song debuted at number 86 on the US Billboard Hot 100, earning Jeongyeon her first solo entry on the chart. "Takedown" later reached a peak chart position of number 50 on the chart.

In August 2026, Jeongyeon announced that she had left JYP Entertainment and had signed a new contract with Varo Entertainment, the agency to which her sister Seung-yeon belongs. She stated that she would remain a member of Twice as she participates in new activities. In September, it was announced that she will be part of tvN's television program Just a Friend, directed by Na Yeong-seok.

== Discography ==
=== Singles ===
List of singles, showing year released, selected chart positions and album name
Title	Year	Peak chart positions										Certifications	Album
Title	Year	KOR	AUS	CAN	MLY	NZ	SGP	TWN	UK	US	WW	Certifications	Album
"Takedown" (with Jihyo and Chaeyoung of Twice)	2025	38	28	45	23	29	22	15	24	50	30	BPI: Silver; RMNZ: Gold	KPop Demon Hunters

=== Promotional singles ===
List of promotional singles, showing year released, and album name
Title	Year	Album
"O Christmas Tree"	2023	Non-album promotional single

=== Collaborations ===
List of collaboration singles, showing year released and album name
Title	Year	Album
"Encore" (with Yubin, Yeeun, Hyerim, Min, Nichkhun, Junho, Mark, Jackson, Yugyeom, Nayeon, Momo and Mina as JYP Nation)	2016	Non-album single

=== Soundtrack appearances ===
List of soundtrack appearances, showing year released and name of the album
Title	Year	Album
"Like a Star" (별처럼) (with Gong Seung-yeon)	2018	My Dream Class (Original Soundtrack)

=== Other charted songs ===
List of other charted songs, showing year released, selected chart positions and name of the album
Title	Year	Peak chart positions	Album
Title	Year	KOR Down.	Album
"Fix a Drink" (Note: credited to Twice, but the track is a solo by Jeongyeon)	2025	173	Ten: The Story Goes On

=== Songwriting credits ===
All song credits are adapted from the Korea Music Copyright Association's database unless stated otherwise.

List of songs, showing year released, artist name, and name of the album
Title	Year	Artist	Album	Notes
"Love Line"	2017	Twice	Twicetagram	As lyricist
"Sweet Talker"	2018	Twice	What Is Love?	As lyricist
"LaLaLa"	2018	Twice	Yes or Yes	As lyricist
"21:29"	2019	Twice	Feel Special	As lyricist
"Sweet Summer Day"	2020	Twice	More & More	As lyricist
"Celebrate"	2022	Twice	Celebrate	As lyricist
"Bloom"	2024	Twice	With You-th	As lyricist
"Mamushi (Remix)"	2024	Megan Thee Stallion (featuring Twice)	Megan: Act II	As lyricist
"Me+You"	2025	Twice	Ten: The Story Goes On	As lyricist

== Filmography ==
=== Film ===
Year	Title	Role	Ref.
TBA	New Recruit: The Movie	TBA	

=== Television shows ===
Year	Title	Role	Notes	Ref.
2015	Sixteen	Contestant		
2016	Muscle Queen Project	Contestant		
2016	Law of the Jungle in New Caledonia	Herself		
2016–2017	Inkigayo	Co-host	With Gong Seung-yeon and Kim Min-seok	
2026	Just a Friend	Cast member	With Joohoney, Lee Seo-jin, and Han Ji-min	

=== Web shows ===
Year	Title	Role	Notes	Ref.
2024–2025	Inspector	Host	YouTube talk show	

== Awards and nominations ==
Name of the award ceremony, year presented, category, nominee of the award, and the result of the nomination
Award ceremony	Year	Category	Nominee / Work	Result	Ref.
SBS Entertainment Awards	2016	Newcomer Award (Female)	Jeongyeon (with Gong Seung-yeon); Inkigayo	Won	
