= Sana (singer) =

Japanese singer (born 1996)

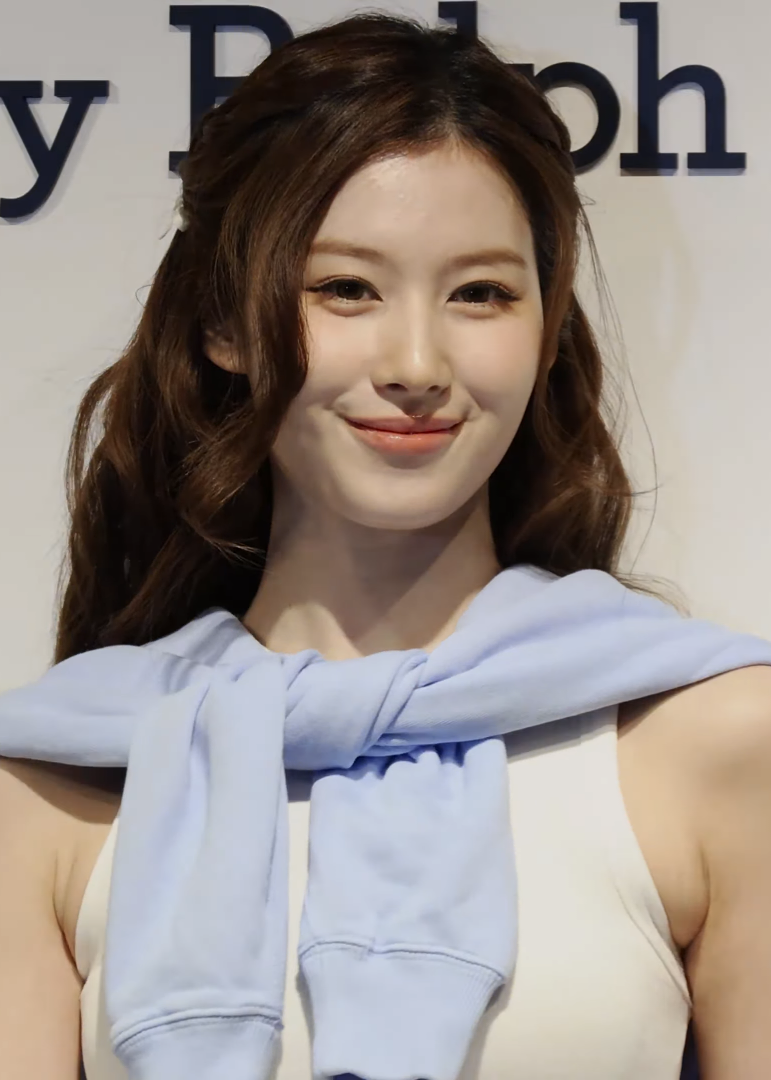
- Sana in 2026
- Born: Sana Minatozaki; December 29, 1996 (age 29); Osaka, Japan
- Occupation: Singer
- Musical career
- Origin: Seoul, South Korea
- Genres: K-pop; J-pop
- Instrument: Vocals
- Years active: 2015–present
- Labels: JYP; Warner Japan; Republic
- Member of: Twice; MiSaMo; JYP Nation

Japanese name
- Kanji: 湊﨑 紗夏
- Revised Hepburn: Minatozaki Sana

Sana Minatozaki (Japanese: 湊﨑 紗夏; born December 29, 1996), known mononymously as Sana (Korean: 사나; Japanese: サナ), is a Japanese singer based in South Korea. She is a member of the South Korean girl group Twice, formed in 2015 by JYP Entertainment, and its subunit MiSaMo, formed in 2023.

== Career ==
=== Early life and pre-debut ===
Sana was born on December 29, 1996 in Tennōji-ku, Osaka, Japan, as an only child. Sana stated that she wanted to become a singer and dancer early on and was inspired by the K-pop group Girls' Generation. Sana began training with EXPG in Osaka in 2009, originally planning to be a singer in Japan, rather than South Korea. During her middle school years, she was scouted by a JYP Entertainment (JYPE) employee at a shopping mall and was invited to participate in the annual JYP Japan audition the following day. Sana passed the audition and joined the JYPE trainee program in South Korea in April 2012. She trained for over three years before her eventual debut with Twice. In 2012, she was expected to become a member of a four-member girl group aimed at the Japanese market, but plans for the group were cancelled in part due to tensions between Japan and Korea following the Liancourt Rocks dispute; she was later scheduled to debut in a six-member group called 6Mix, but the group's debut was also cancelled due to the sinking of MV Sewol. In 2014, Sana appeared in Got7's music video for "A" as a waitress.

=== 2015–present: Sixteen, Twice, solo activities, MiSaMo, and acting ===
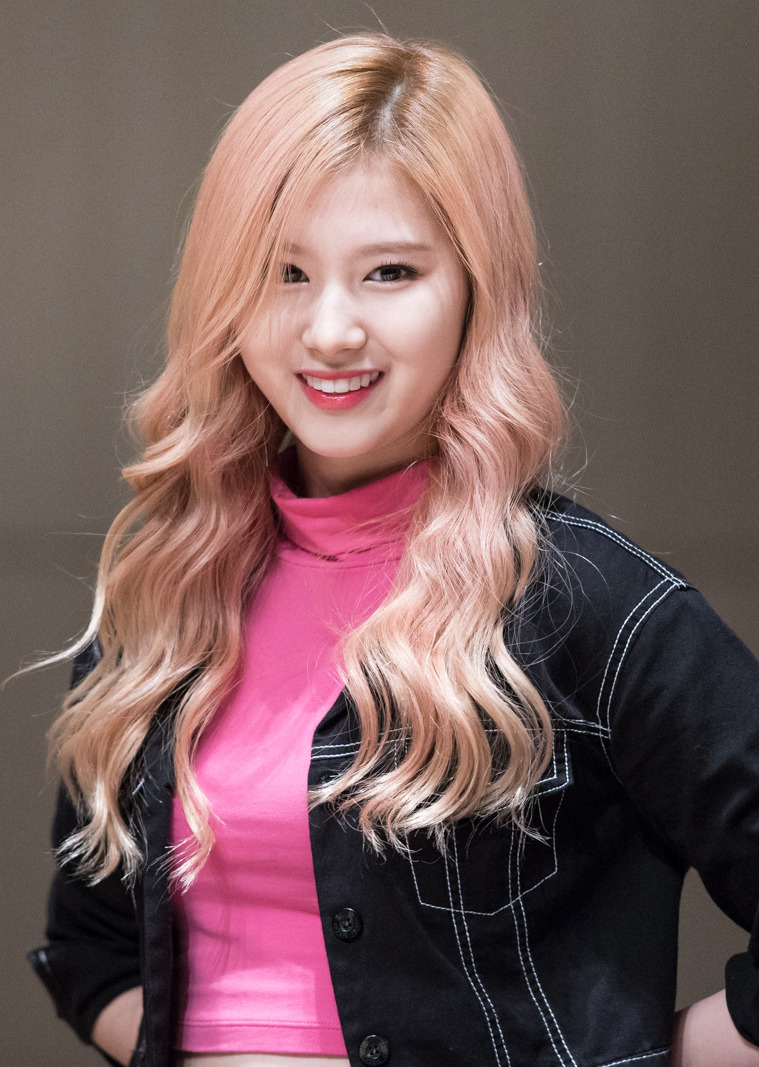
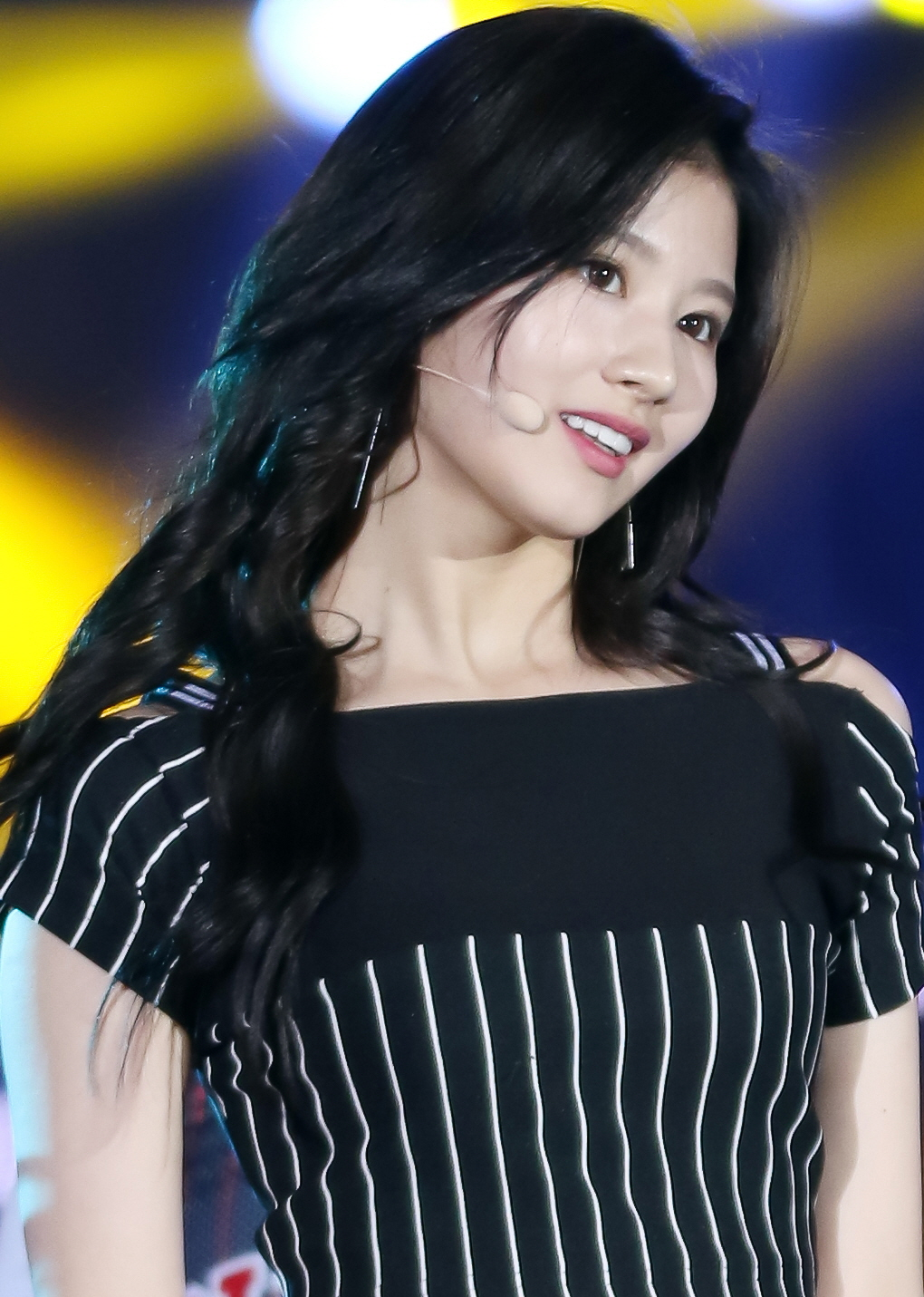
Sana in 2015 and 2016

In 2015, Sana participated in the music survival show Sixteen, a reality television series to determine the members of Twice. Out of the sixteen contestants, Sana was selected as one of the nine members of the newly formed girl group. She officially debuted with Twice in October 2015 with the title song "Like Ooh-Ahh" from their debut extended play The Story Begins.

In February 2021, Sana became the first Twice member to release a solo single after she covered "Sotsugyou", a 2020 single by Japanese band Kobukuro. The cover, which includes an a cappella version, was released as a digital single through Warner Music Japan. She released a version with Kobukuro themselves in March 2021.

On February 9, 2023, JYPE announced that Sana, alongside bandmates Momo and Mina, would officially debut in Japan on July 26 as a sub-unit named MiSaMo with the extended play titled Masterpiece. Prior to the trio's debut, on January 25, they released the track "Bouquet" as part of the soundtrack of TV Asahi's drama series Liaison: Kodomo no Kokoro Shinryōjo.

In September 2023, Sana appeared as a guest on Dex's Fridge Interview, a YouTube talk show hosted by Dex. Sana's episode became the most viewed video on the channel, exceeding 10 million views. She replaced Dex as the host from March to June 2024, and returned for a second season from March to August 2025. During this time the show was known as Sana's Fridge Interview. In December 2025, Sana appeared in Daesung's music video for "Hando-Chogua".

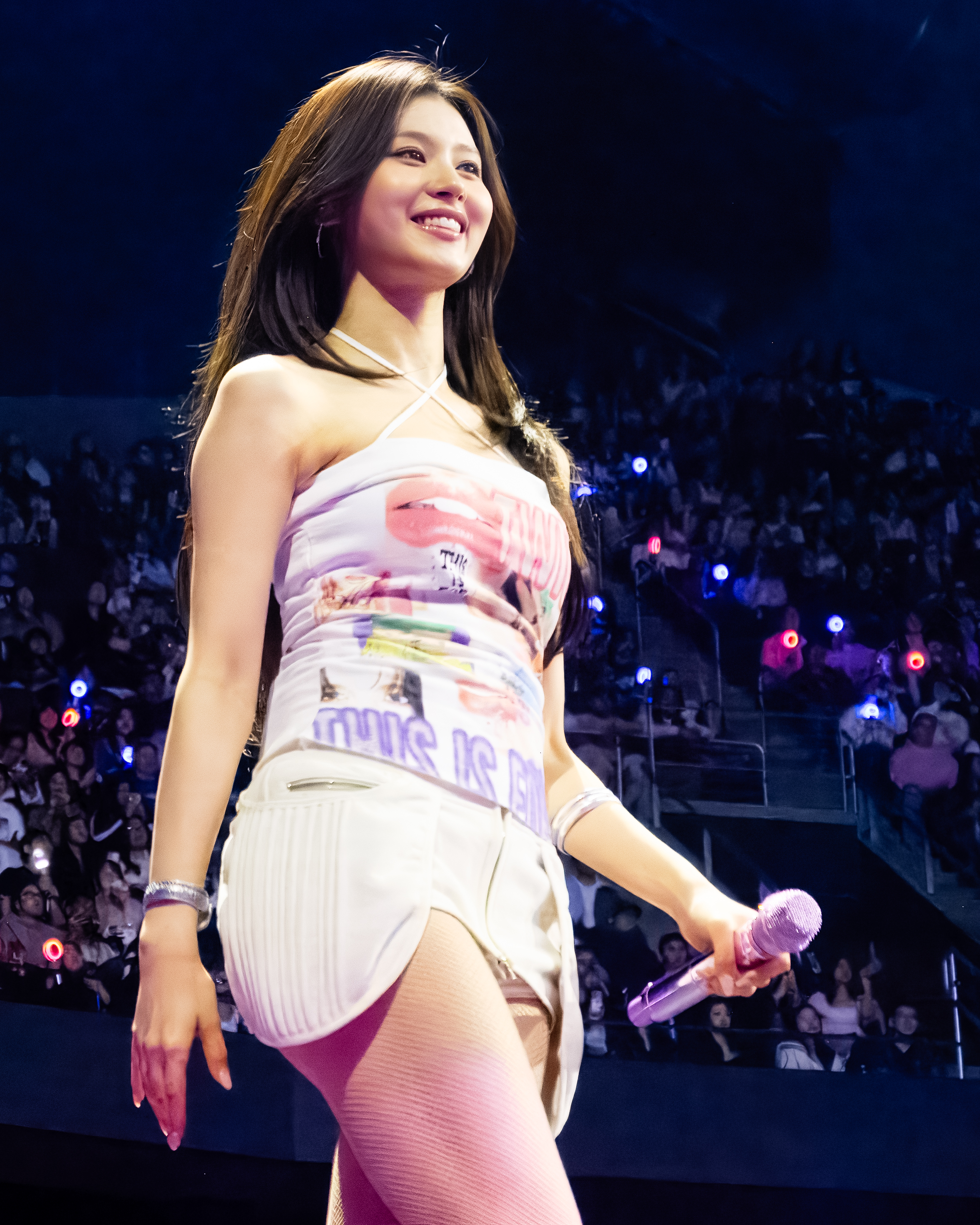
Sana performing on the "This Is For World Tour" in Seattle in 2026

On July 8, 2026, JYP Entertainment announced that Sana will be making her acting debut in director Kwon Hyuk-chan's upcoming film Nyangi. She will play the main female lead with Japanese actor Takeru Satoh as the main male lead, who previously worked together with Sana for MiSaMo's Play highlight medley video. In July 2026, she returned for yet another season of Sana's Fridge Interview.

== Image and influence ==
Sana has received recognition in both South Korea and abroad for her energetic and cheerful personality. Her popularity also has been credited with helping to improve relations between Japan and South Korea. In Gallup Korea's annual music poll for 2018, Sana was voted the 17th most popular idol in South Korea, the highest-ranked Japanese individual in the poll. She ranked 15th in the 2019 poll. In 2019, Sana also ranked as the most popular female K-pop idol in a survey of soldiers completing mandatory military service in South Korea.

== Endorsements ==
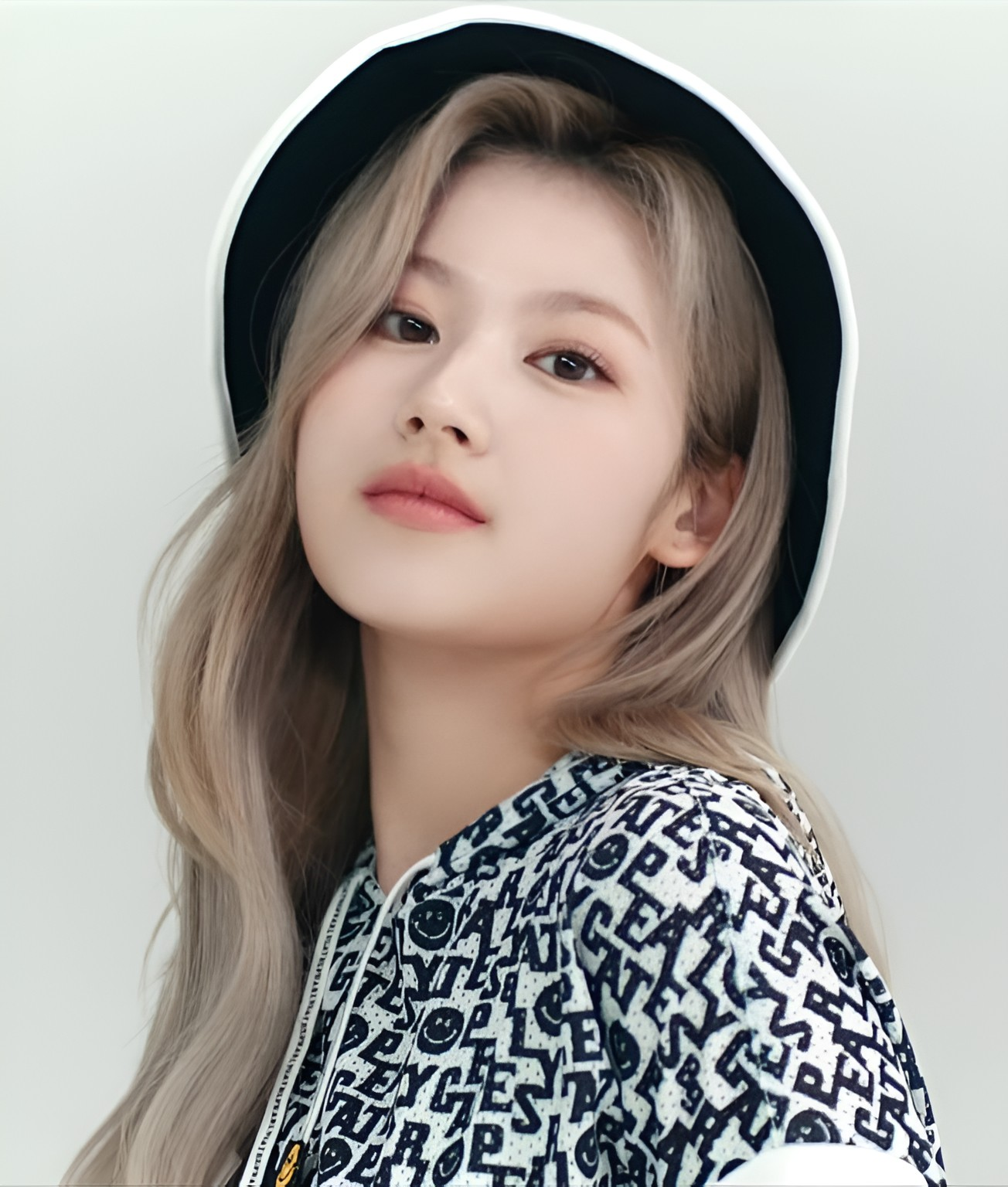
Sana campaign film, Pearly Gates x Twice in 2022

Outside of Twice, Sana was featured in several advertisements and has promoted various brands and products. In 2021, Sana and Twice bandmate Dahyun became models for skincare brand A'pieu. In March 2022, Sana became a model for Olive Young's cosmetics brand WakeMake.

In March 2023, Sana was selected as an ambassador for both the South Korean skin care brand Missha and the makeup brand Espoir. In July 2023, Sana became the first Japan ambassador for British multinational jeweller Graff. In September 2023, Italian luxury fashion house Prada named Sana as their brand ambassador. In December 2023, cosmetics brand YSL Beauty appointed Sana as their newest brand ambassador in Japan. On November 14, 2024, Ralph Lauren Japan announced Sana as their brand ambassador.

== Discography ==
=== Singles ===
List of singles, showing year released, and album name
Title	Year	Album
"Sotsugyou" (卒業) (Note: A version with the original artist, Kobukuro, was also released as a single.)	2021	Non-album single

=== Other charted songs ===
List of other charted songs, showing year released, selected chart positions and name of the album
Title	Year	Peak chart positions			Album
Title	Year	KOR Down	NZ Hot	US World	Album
"I'll Show You" (with Jihyo, Nayeon, Chaeyoung, Bekuh Boom and Annika Wells as K/DA)	2020	—	38	10	All Out
"Decaffeinated" (Note: credited to Twice, but the track is a solo by Sana)	2025	164	—	—	Ten: The Story Goes On

=== Songwriting credits ===
All song credits are adapted from the Korea Music Copyright Association's database unless stated otherwise.

List of songs, showing year released, artist name, and name of the album
Title	Year	Artist	Album	Notes
"Shot Thru the Heart"	2018	Twice	Summer Nights	As lyricist
"Turn It Up"	2019	Twice	Fancy You	As lyricist
"21:29"	2019	Twice	Feel Special	As lyricist
"Do What We Like"	2020	Twice	Eyes Wide Open	As lyricist
"Conversation"	2021	Twice	Taste of Love	As lyricist
"Celebrate"	2022	Twice	Celebrate	As lyricist
"Rewind You"	2023	MiSaMo	Masterpiece	As lyricist
"Mamushi (Remix)"	2024	Megan Thee Stallion (featuring Twice)	Megan: Act II	As lyricist
"Mirage" (Note: credited to MiSaMo, but the track is a solo by Sana)	2024	MiSaMo	Haute Couture	As lyricist
"Me+You"	2025	Twice	Ten: The Story Goes On	As lyricist

== Filmography ==
=== Television shows ===
Year	Title	Role	Ref.
2015	Sixteen	Contestant	
2016	Show! Music Core	Host	
2016	2016 Idol Star Athletics Rhythmic Gymnastics Futsal Archery Championships	Host	
2017	KBS Song Festival	Host	
2018	M Countdown	Host	
2019	2019 Idol Star Lunar New Year Athletics Bowling Archery Rhythmic Gymnastics Penalty Shoot-out Championships	Host	
2020	Nizi Project: Part 2	Special judge + Host (Note: Surprise appearance as a special judge in episode 9 of Part 1 and appeared as Host on the final stage of Part 2.)	

=== Web shows ===
Year	Title	Role	Notes	Ref.
2024–present	Sana's Fridge Interview	Host	YouTube talk show	

== Bibliography ==
=== Photobooks ===
Title	Release date	Publisher	Ref.
Yes, I am Sana.	April 16, 2021	JYP Entertainment	
