= Mina (Japanese singer) =

Japanese singer (born 1997)

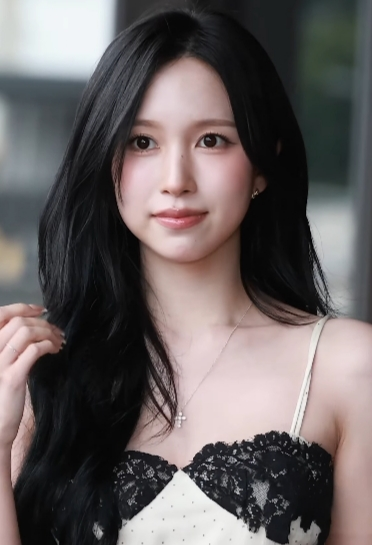
- Mina in 2026
- Born: Mina Sharon Myoi; March 24, 1997 (age 29); San Antonio, Texas, US
- Citizenship: Japan; United States (until 2019)
- Occupations: Singer; dancer
- Years active: 2015–present
- Musical career
- Origin: Seoul, South Korea
- Genres: K-pop; J-pop
- Instrument: Vocals
- Labels: JYP; Warner Japan; Republic
- Member of: Twice; MiSaMo; JYP Nation

Japanese name
- Kanji: 名井 南
- Revised Hepburn: Myōi Mina

Mina Myoi (Japanese: 名井 南; born Mina Sharon Myoi, March 24, 1997), known mononymously as Mina (Korean: 미나; Japanese: ミナ), is a Japanese singer and dancer based in South Korea. She is a member of the South Korean girl group Twice, which debuted under JYP Entertainment in 2015, and its subgroup MiSaMo, which debuted in 2023.

== Early life and education ==
Mina was born on March 24, 1997, in San Antonio, Texas to Japanese expatriate parents Sachiko (née Terao) and Akira Myoi. As a toddler, Mina and her family soon moved back to Japan, growing up in Nishinomiya, Hyōgo Prefecture, in the Kansai region of Japan. Her father is an orthopedic surgeon at Osaka University Hospital in Suita. She has one brother named Kai, who is five years older than her. Mina trained in classical ballet from the age of three and practiced it for eleven years. She then trained at a K-pop dance studio for a year before being scouted by JYP Entertainment. Mina attended Obayashi Sacred Heart School in Takarazuka, Hyōgo until 2013. In her second year of high school, she dropped out to become a trainee in South Korea.

In 2017, by virtue of birthright citizenship in the United States, it was reported at the time that Mina held dual Japanese and American citizenship. She renounced her American citizenship in 2019.

== Career ==
=== Pre-debut ===
Mina was shopping with her mother in Osaka when she was approached and offered an audition by a recruiter from JYP Entertainment. She moved to South Korea in January 2014 to become a trainee at JYP Entertainment. In 2015, Mina participated in the South Korean reality television show Sixteen, created by JYP Entertainment and co-produced by Mnet. As one of nine successful participants, she went on to join the newly formed girl group Twice.

=== Debut with Twice and MiSaMo ===
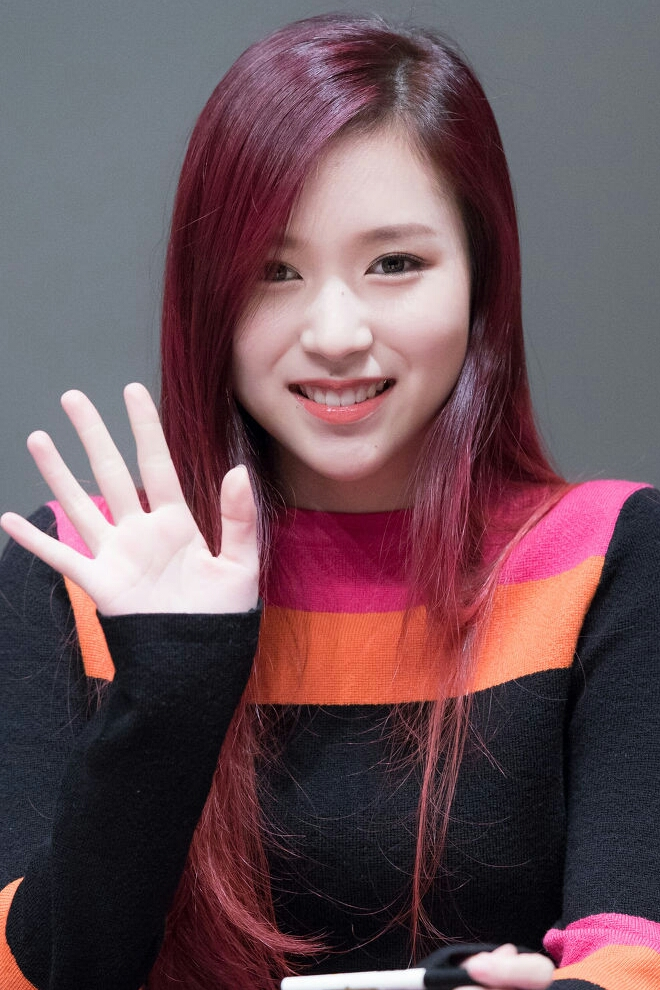
Mina in 2015

In October 2015, Mina officially debuted as a member of Twice with the release of their first extended play, The Story Begins. Its lead single "Like Ooh-Ahh" was the first K-pop debut song to reach 100 million views on YouTube.

On July 11, 2019, JYP Entertainment announced that Mina would sit out the remainder of the Twicelights World Tour due to her extreme anxiety and insecurity regarding onstage performances. She was later diagnosed with an anxiety disorder. She rejoined the tour in a limited capacity in October. In February 2020, it was reported that Mina's condition had improved and she participated fully in the Fukuoka concert.

On February 9, 2023, JYP announced that Mina, alongside bandmates Sana and Momo, would officially debut in Japan on July 26 as a sub-unit named MiSaMo with the extended play titled Masterpiece. Prior to the trio's debut, on January 25, they released the track "Bouquet" as part of the soundtrack of TV Asahi's drama series Liaison: Kodomo no Kokoro Shinryōjo.

== Public image ==
Since her debut, Mina has been recognized as one of Twice's strongest dancers along with Momo, both in South Korea and abroad. The Chosun Ilbo credits her popularity with helping improve relations between Japan and South Korea. In Gallup Korea's annual music poll of 2019, she was voted the 20th most popular idol in South Korea.

== Endorsements ==
In early 2022, Mina was announced as the new muse of the South Korean luxury fashion brand Metrocity. In March of the same year, she was announced as the global brand ambassador of SK-II, a Japanese cosmetics brand. In August 2024, Mina was announced as the Japan ambassador of French luxury jewelry and watch house Boucheron. In January 2025, she was announced as the Japan ambassador of Italian luxury fashion house Fendi.

== Discography ==
=== Collaborations ===
List of collaboration singles, showing year released and album name
Title	Year	Album
"Encore" (with Yubin, Yeeun, Hyerim, Min, Nichkhun, Junho, Mark, Jackson, Yugyeom, Nayeon, Jeongyeon and Momo as JYP Nation)	2016	Non-album single

=== Other charted songs ===
List of other charted songs, showing year released, selected chart positions and name of the album
Title	Year	Peak chart positions	Album
Title	Year	KOR Down.	Album
"Stone Cold" (Note: credited to Twice, but the track is a solo by Mina)	2025	193	Ten: The Story Goes On

=== Songwriting credits ===
All song credits are adapted from the Korea Music Copyright Association's database unless stated otherwise.

List of songs, showing year released, artist name, and name of the album
Title	Year	Artist	Album	Notes
"Shot Thru The Heart"	2018	Twice	Summer Nights	As lyricist
"21:29"	2019	Twice	Feel Special	As lyricist
"Celebrate"	2022	Twice	Celebrate	As lyricist
"It's Not Easy For You"	2023	MiSaMo	Masterpiece	As lyricist
"Misty" (Note: credited to MiSaMo, but the track is a solo by Mina)	2024	MiSaMo	Haute Couture	As lyricist
"Mamushi (Remix)"	2024	Megan Thee Stallion (featuring Twice)	Megan: Act II	As lyricist
"Me+You"	2025	Twice	Ten: The Story Goes On	As lyricist

== Filmography ==
=== Television shows ===
Year	Title	Role	Ref.
2015	Sixteen	Contestant	

== Bibliography ==
=== Photobooks ===
Title	Release date	Publisher	Ref.
Yes, I am Mina.	December 30, 2020	JYP Entertainment	
