= MiSaMo =

Subunit of Twice

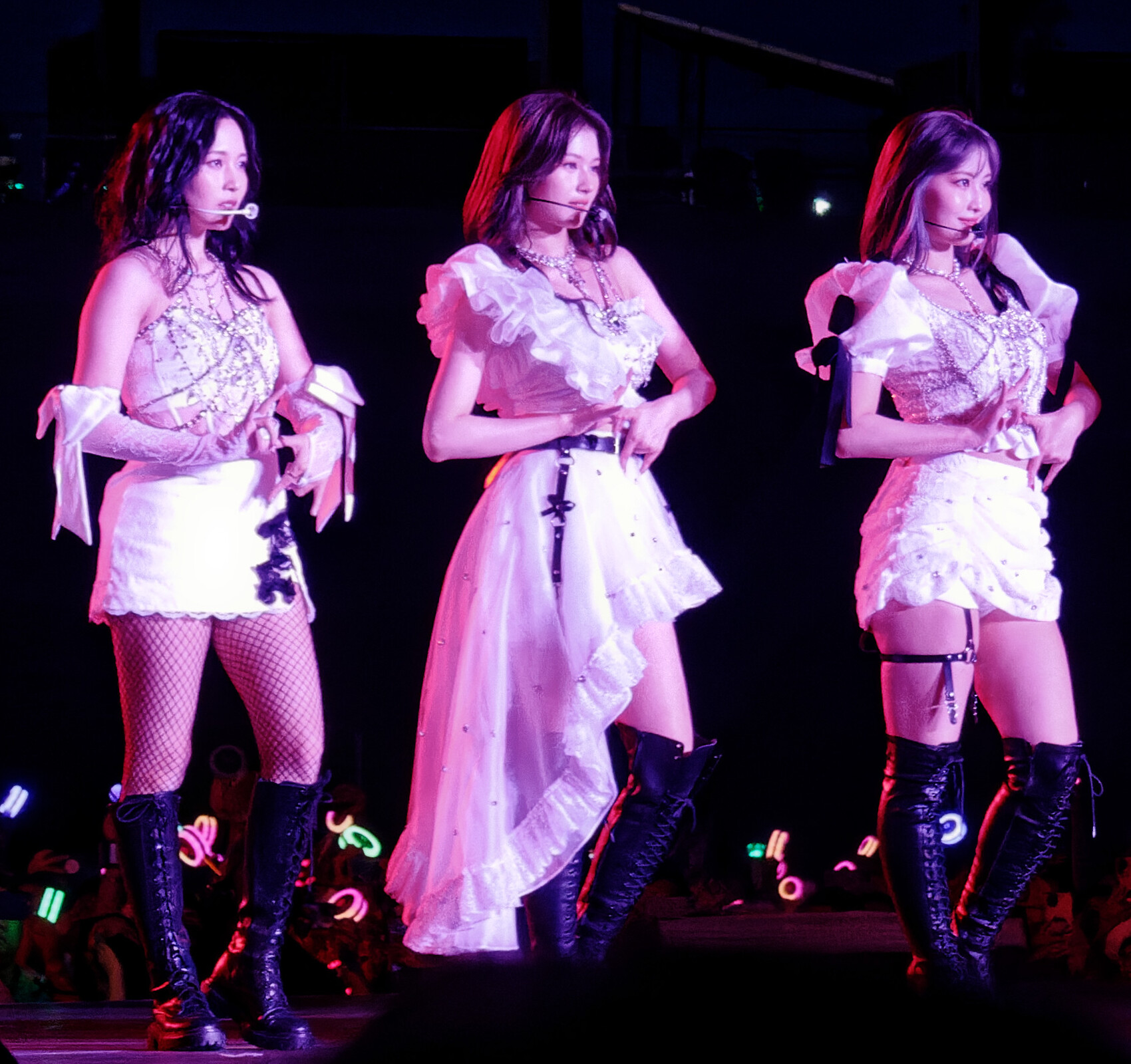
- MiSaMo in 2022; L–R: Mina, Sana, and Momo

Background information
- Origin: Seoul, South Korea
- Genre: J-pop
- Years active: 2023–present
- Labels: JYP; Warner Japan
- Spinoff of: Twice
- Members: Momo; Sana; Mina

MiSaMo (Korean: 미사모; RR: Misamo, stylised in all caps) is the first sub-unit of the South Korean girl group Twice formed by JYP Entertainment. The group consists of Twice's Japanese members, Momo, Sana, and Mina. They debuted in 2023 with the extended play Masterpiece.

== Name ==
The subunit's name, MiSaMo, is a portmanteau of the names of members Mina, Sana, and Momo. Prior to the subunit's formation, the members often used the term "MiSaMo" to refer to themselves.

== History ==
In 2012, Sana and Momo were originally planned to debut in a four-member girl group in Japan; however, JYP suspended the plan due to the deterioration of the Korean-Japanese relationship following the Liancourt Rocks dispute. In 2015, the members participated in Mnet's Sixteen, a competition survival show to decide Twice's lineup.

In February 2023, JYP announced that MiSaMo would debut with an extended play on July 26, with the track list including "Bouquet", originally released for TV Asahi's Liaison: Kodomo no Kokoro Shinryōjo. Ahead of Masterpiece's release, the song and music video for "Marshmallow" was released on June 15. The song and music video for the lead single, "Do Not Touch", was released on July 14. The group held their debut showcase, titled MiSaMo Japan Showcase "Masterpiece", over five days in Osaka and Yokohama, beginning on July 22. The five shows sold 40,000 tickets from more than 600,000 ticket applications.

On November 13, MiSaMo appeared in their first commercial as a group for the Google app, introducing its Google Lens feature. In December 2023, they participated in the 74th NHK Kōhaku Uta Gassen, where they performed "Do Not Touch". MiSaMo released their second EP Haute Couture on November 6, 2024. The sub-lead track "New Look", a cover of Namie Amuro's "New Look" (2008), was released on October 9 with an accompanying music video. The lead single, "Identity", was released on October 28 along with a music video. On November 2, MiSaMo embarked on a concert tour titled MiSaMo Japan Dome Tour 2024 "Haute Couture". The tour had six shows and 250,000 attendees in total, with MiSaMo breaking the record for fastest Tokyo Dome concert by a female artist.

On April 28, 2025, the group released a single titled "Message". It was chosen as the theme song for the live-action film adaptation of Blank Canvas: My So-Called Artist's Journey, which released in Japan on May 16. MiSaMo's first studio album, Play, was released on February 4, 2026. The lead single, "Confetti", was released on January 16 along with a music video.

== Discography ==
=== Studio albums ===
List of studio albums, with selected details, chart positions, sales, and certifications
Title	Details	Peak chart positions		Sales	Certifications
Title	Details	JPN	JPN Hot	Sales	Certifications
Play	Released: February 4, 2026; Label: Warner Japan; Formats: CD, digital download, streaming	1	1	JPN: 102,824 (phy.)	RIAJ: Gold

=== Extended plays ===
List of extended plays, with selected details, chart positions, sales, and certifications
Title	Details	Peak chart positions		Sales	Certifications
Title	Details	JPN	JPN Hot	Sales	Certifications
Masterpiece	Released: July 26, 2023; Label: Warner Japan; Formats: CD, digital download, streaming	1	1	JPN: 200,819 (phy.)	RIAJ: Platinum
Haute Couture	Released: November 6, 2024; Label: Warner Japan; Formats: CD, digital download, streaming	2	2	JPN: 203,973 (phy.)	RIAJ: Platinum

=== Singles ===
List of singles, with selected chart positions, sales, and certifications, showing year released and album name
Title	Year	Peak chart positions				Sales	Certifications	Album
Title	Year	JPN Cmb.	JPN Hot	NZ Hot	US World	Sales	Certifications	Album
"Bouquet"	2023	28	32	—	—	JPN: 3,020 (dig.)		Masterpiece
"Marshmallow"	2023	—	57	—	—			Masterpiece
"Do Not Touch"	2023	45	58	17	13	JPN: 1,085 (dig.)	RIAJ: Gold (st.)	Masterpiece
"New Look"	2024	10	8	—	—	JPN: 4,297 (dig.)	RIAJ: Platinum (st.)	Haute Couture
"Identity"	2024	29	32	—	—	JPN: 1,278 (dig.)		Haute Couture
"Message"	2025	— (Note: "Message" did not enter the Oricon Combined Singles Chart, but peaked at number 25 on the Oricon Digital Singles Chart.)	— (Note: "Message" did not enter the Billboard Japan Hot 100, but peaked at number 26 on the Billboard Japan Download Songs chart.)	—	—	JPN: 1,966 (dig.)		Play
"Confetti"	2026	—	85	—	—			Play
"—" denotes a recording that did not chart or was not released in that territory

== Videography ==
=== Music videos ===
List of music videos, showing year released, and directors
Title	Year	Director(s)	Ref.
"Marshmallow"	2023	Shin Dongle, KimAyla (Dee)	
"Do Not Touch"	2023	Guzza (Kudo)	
"New Look"	2024	Song Min-gyu (Loveandmoney)	
"Identity"	2024	Guzza (Kudo)	
"Confetti"	2026	Guzza (Kudo)	

=== Video albums ===
List of video albums, with selected details, chart positions and sales
Title	Details	Peak chart positions		Sales
Title	Details	JPN DVD	JPN Blu-ray	Sales
MiSaMo Japan Showcase "Masterpiece"	Released: December 20, 2023; Label: Warner Music Japan; Formats: DVD, Blu-ray	4	6	JPN: 18,478
MiSaMo Japan Dome Tour 2024 "Haute Couture"	Released: June 4, 2025; Label: Warner Music Japan; Formats: DVD, Blu-ray	1	1	JPN: 20,460

== Concert tours ==
=== MiSaMo Japan Showcase "Masterpiece" ===
Set list

Main set

1. "Behind the Curtain"
2. "It's Not Easy for You"
3. "Rewind You"
4. "Funny Valentine"
5. "Marshmallow"
6. "Do Not Touch

Encore

1. "Bouquet"
2. "Do Not Touch" / "Behind the Curtain" / "Rewind You" / "Funny Valentine" / "Marshmallow" / "It's Not Easy for You" / "Bouquet" (medley)

Tour dates
Date	City	Country	Venue	Attendance
July 22, 2023	Osaka	Japan	Intex Osaka	40,000
July 23, 2023	Osaka	Japan	Intex Osaka	40,000
July 25, 2023	Yokohama	Japan	Pia Arena MM	40,000
July 26, 2023	Yokohama	Japan	Pia Arena MM	40,000
July 27, 2023	Yokohama	Japan	Pia Arena MM	40,000

=== MiSaMo Japan Dome Tour 2024 "Haute Couture" ===
Set list

Main set

1. "Do Not Touch"
2. "Red Diamond"
3. "It's Not Easy for You"
4. "Rewind You"
5. "Marshmallow"
6. "Bouquet"
7. "Wah Wah Wah"
8. "Mirage" (Sana solo)
9. "Misty" (Mina solo)
10. "Money in My Pocket" (Momo solo)
11. "Identity"
12. "Runway"
13. "Jealousy"
14. "Baby, I'm Good"
15. "Funny Valentine"
16. "New Look"
17. "Behind the Curtain"

Encore

1. "Daydream"
2. "New Look" / "Identity" / "Wah Wah Wah" / "Do Not Touch" / "Behind the Curtain" / "Marshmallow" (medley)
3. "Catch My Eye" (Tokyo dates only)

Tour dates
Date	City	Country	Venue	Attendance
November 2, 2024	Tokorozawa	Japan	Belluna Dome	250,000
November 3, 2024	Tokorozawa	Japan	Belluna Dome	250,000
November 16, 2024	Osaka	Japan	Kyocera Dome Osaka	250,000
November 17, 2024	Osaka	Japan	Kyocera Dome Osaka	250,000
January 15, 2025	Tokyo	Japan	Tokyo Dome	250,000
January 16, 2025	Tokyo	Japan	Tokyo Dome	250,000

== Awards and nominations ==
Name of the award ceremony, year presented, award category, nominee(s) of the award, and the result of the nomination
Award ceremony	Year	Category	Nominee(s)	Result	Ref.
Music Awards Japan	2025	Best of Listeners' Choice: Japanese Song	"New Look"	Nominated	
