= Momo (singer) =

Japanese singer (born 1996)

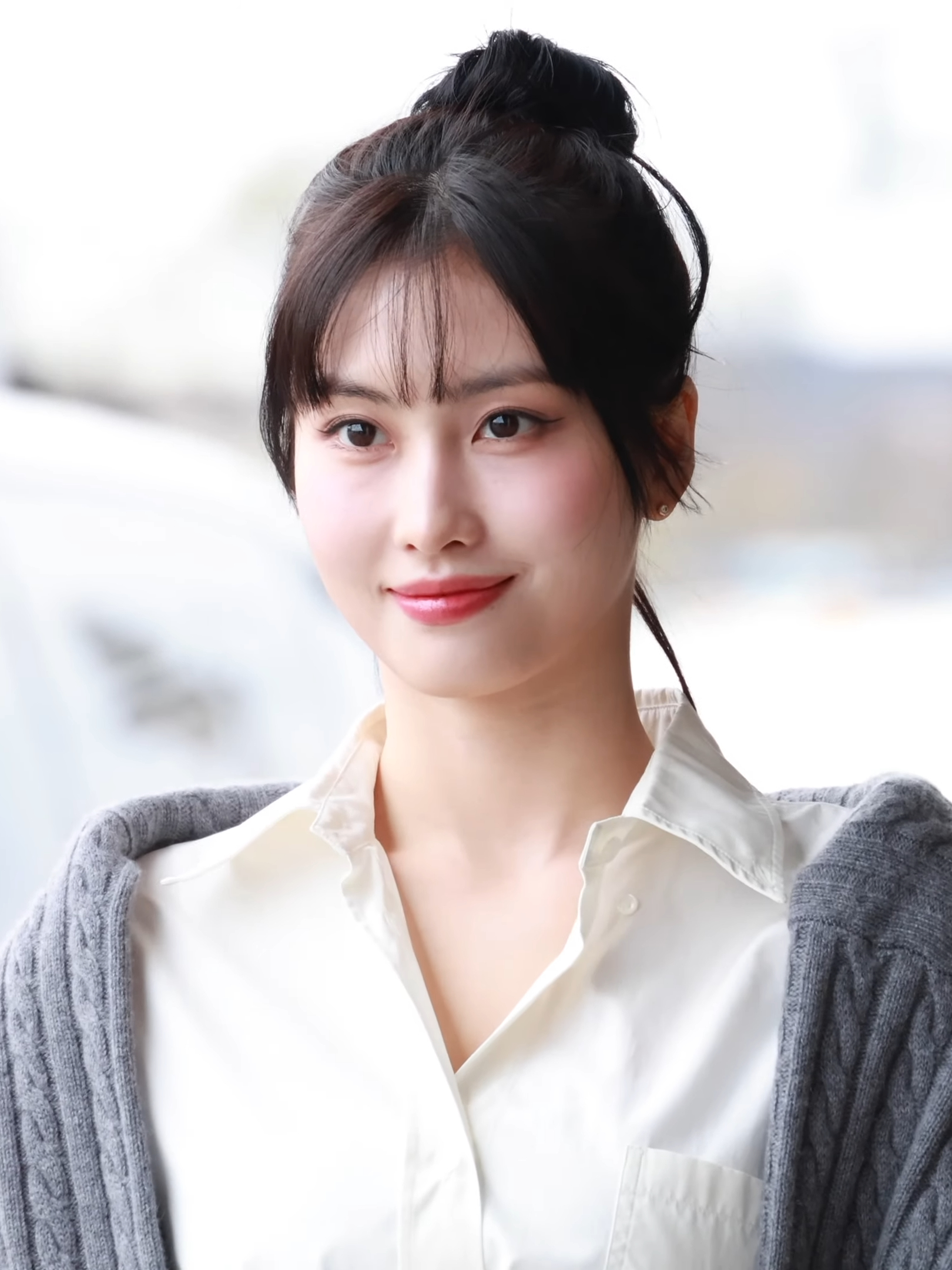
- Momo in 2024
- Born: Momo Hirai; November 9, 1996 (age 30); Kyōtanabe, Kyoto Prefecture, Japan
- Occupations: Singer; dancer; rapper
- Musical career
- Origin: Seoul, South Korea
- Genres: K-pop; J-pop
- Instrument: Vocals
- Years active: 2015–present
- Labels: JYP; Warner Japan; Republic
- Member of: Twice; MiSaMo; JYP Nation
- Website: twice.jype.com

Japanese name
- Kanji: 平井 もも
- Romanization: Hirai Momo

Momo Hirai (Japanese: 平井 もも; 平井 桃; born November 9, 1996) is a Japanese singer, dancer, and rapper based in South Korea. Signed to JYP Entertainment, she has been a member of the South Korean girl group Twice since 2015. In 2023, she, alongside Twice's other Japanese members, Sana and Mina, began releasing music in its subunit MiSaMo.

== Life and career ==
=== Early life and pre-debut activities ===
Momo Hirai was born in Kyōtanabe, Kyoto Prefecture, Japan. She began dancing at the age of three, together with her elder sister, Hana.

Momo gained exposure to the South Korean music industry early, appearing in a music video for Lexy in 2008 and on the talent show Superstar K in 2011. Momo and her sister were originally spotted by JYP Entertainment in an online video in 2012. They were both asked to audition, although only Momo was successful, prompting her to move to South Korea in April 2012. Before joining Twice, she danced in a number of music videos as a "K-Pop trainee". Momo was originally planned to debut in a four-member girl group in Japan in 2012; however, JYP suspended the plan due to the deterioration of the Korean-Japanese relationship following the Liancourt Rocks dispute. In 2015, Momo participated in the South Korean reality television show Sixteen, created by JYP Entertainment and co-produced by Mnet. She was initially eliminated from the show but was brought back by J.Y. Park at the end to become part of the final lineup of girl group Twice, due to her performance abilities.

=== Debut with Twice and MiSaMo ===
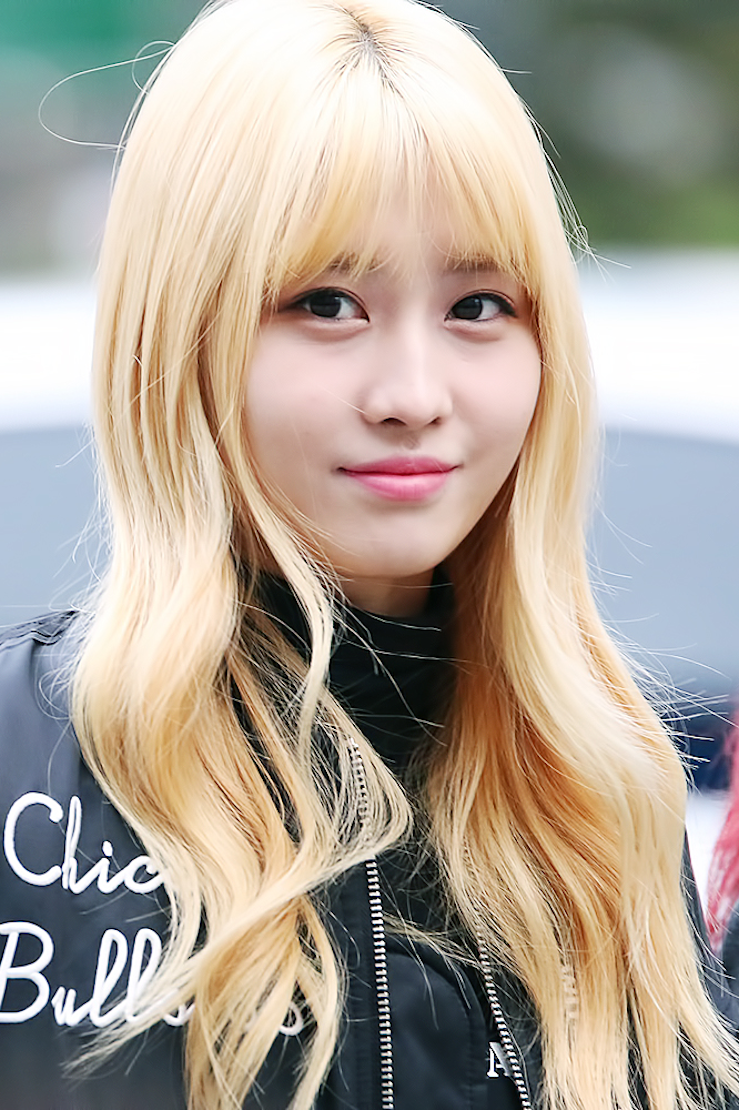
Momo in November 2015

In October 2015, Momo officially debuted as a member of Twice with the release of their first extended play (EP), The Story Begins, and its lead single "Like Ooh-Ahh". On February 9, 2023, JYP announced that Momo, alongside bandmates Sana and Mina, would officially debut in Japan on July 26 as a sub-unit named MiSaMo with the extended play titled Masterpiece. Prior to the trio's debut, on January 25, they released the track "Bouquet" as part of the soundtrack of TV Asahi's drama series Liaison: Kodomo no Kokoro Shinryōjo.

== Artistry ==
Momo revealed that she was influenced by her older sister Hana from an early age; where she began dancing with her at the age of three. She also revealed that the J-pop singer Namie Amuro is her role model and that she "wanted to be like her someday". She noted that she loves 2NE1 and Rain, explaining, "I always wanted to thrill people with my dance, and K-pop dance thrilled me".

== Endorsements ==
In 2022, Momo was appointed as the brand muse of Wonjungyo, a cosmetic brand supervised by Won Jung-yo, Twice's makeup artist. In October 2022, she was announced as the brand ambassador of the Japanese sports brand, Onitsuka Tiger. In May 2023, she made an appearance as a model to promote the Japanese news app SmartNews. In June 2023, Momo was selected as Japanese ambassador for the Italian fashion brand Miu Miu. In May 2025, Momo was selected to be a brand ambassador for the perfume brand AMAFFI.

== Image and influence ==
Known for her physical fitness and body movements, she was nicknamed "Dance Machine" among her fans, and is considered Twice's best dancer.

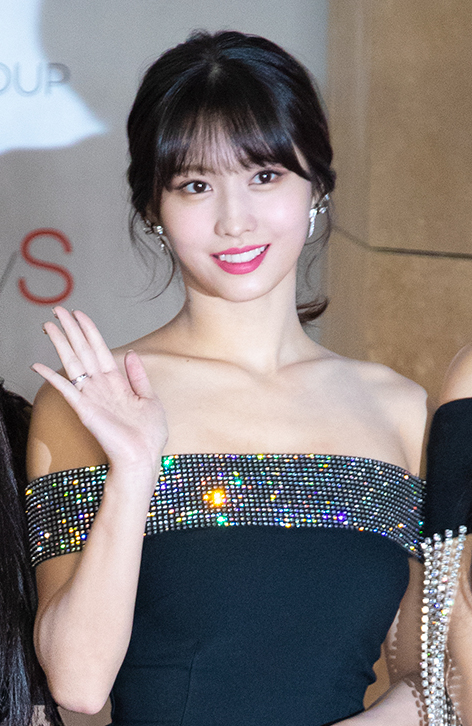
Momo during 2018 Asia Artist Awards

In Gallup Korea's annual music poll for 2018, Momo was voted the 20th most popular idol in South Korea, the second highest-ranked Japanese individual in the poll, behind Twice bandmate Sana. She has been one of the most popular non-Korean K-pop stars since her debut, and The Chosun Ilbo credits her popularity with helping improve relations between South Korea and Japan. In 2019, Momo received attention on Twitter after a video trailer of her was released for Feel Special and ranked as the tenth most popular female K-pop idol in a survey of soldiers completing mandatory military service in South Korea. In 2023, she surpassed Naomi Watanabe and became the first Japanese person to hit 10 million followers on Instagram only after eight months of opening her page on said platform.

== Discography ==
=== Collaborations ===
List of collaboration singles, showing year released and album name
Title	Year	Album
"Encore" (with Yubin, Yeeun, Hyerim, Min, Nichkhun, Junho, Mark, Jackson, Yugyeom, Nayeon, Jeongyeon and Mina as JYP Nation)	2016	Non-album single

=== Other charted songs ===
List of other charted songs, showing year released, selected chart positions and name of the album
Title	Year	Peak chart positions	Album
Title	Year	KOR Down.	Album
"Move Like That" (Note: credited to Twice, but the track is a solo by Momo)	2025	179	Ten: The Story Goes On

=== Songwriting credits ===
All song credits are adapted from the Korea Music Copyright Association's database unless stated otherwise.

List of songs, showing year released, artist name, and name of the album
Title	Year	Artist	Album	Notes
"Shot Thru the Heart"	2018	Twice	Summer Nights	As lyricist
"Hot"	2019	Twice	Fancy You	As lyricist
"Love Foolish"	2019	Twice	Feel Special	As lyricist
"21:29"	2019	Twice	Feel Special	As lyricist
"Celebrate"	2022	Twice	Celebrate	As lyricist
"Funny Valentine"	2023	MiSaMo	Masterpiece	As lyricist
"Mamushi (Remix)"	2024	Megan Thee Stallion (featuring Twice)	Megan: Act II	As lyricist
"Money in My Pocket" (Note: credited to MiSaMo, but the track is a solo by Momo)	2024	MiSaMo	Haute Couture	As lyricist
"Me+You"	2025	Twice	Ten: The Story Goes On	As lyricist

== Filmography ==
=== Television shows ===
Year	Title	Role	Note	Ref.
2015	Sixteen	Contestant		
2016	Hit the Stage	Contestant	Episode 1–4	
2017	Real Class – Elementary Kid Teachers	Cast	Lunar New Year special (2 Parts)	

=== Hosting ===
Year	Title	Notes	Ref.
2016	Suwon K-pop Super Concert	with Kim Hee-chul, Zhou Mi and Chaeyoung	
