= The Story Begins =

2015 extended play by Twice

EP by Twice
- Released: October 20, 2015
- Recorded: 2015
- Studio: JYPE Studios
- Genres: K-pop; dance
- Length: 19:55
- Languages: Korean; English
- Label: JYP
- Producer: J. Y. Park

Twice chronology
The Story Begins (2015)	Page Two (2016)

Singles from The Story Begins
- 1. "Like Ooh-Ahh" Released: October 20, 2015

The Story Begins is the debut extended play by South Korean girl group Twice. It was released by JYP Entertainment on October 20, 2015. It features six tracks, including the lead single, "Like Ooh-Ahh", which was composed by Black Eyed Pilseung and is a blend of several different genres.

Following the formation of Twice through the survival show Sixteen, which concluded in July 2015, the group made their official debut three months later. The group promoted their debut EP on several South Korean music show programs, with the EP meeting moderate commercial success, peaking at number three on the Gaon Album Chart and selling over 40,000 copies by the end of 2015.

== Background and release ==
On February 11, 2015, JYP Entertainment founder Park Jin-young announced the company's collaboration with Mnet to air Sixteen, a competition survival show that would decide the lineup of an upcoming girl group, the first under JYPE in five years, following the debut of Miss A in 2010. The show, which featured a total of 16 candidates, began airing on May 5.

The show concluded on July 7, with Nayeon, Jeongyeon, Sana, Jihyo, Mina, Dahyun, and Chaeyoung being selected as the seven Twice members. Park then made the controversial decision of adding two eliminated contestants: Tzuyu, who was known as the "audience's pick" since she was the most popular contestant by the show's end, and Momo, who was added by Park himself since he felt the group needed someone with Momo's performance abilities. It was then announced that the new girl group under JYPE would be making their debut in the later half of 2015.

On October 7, JYPE confirmed that Twice would make their official debut on October 20, with the agency releasing a group teaser image. On October 9, Twice released a group teaser image and confirmed that the lead single for their upcoming album is titled "Like Ooh-Ahh". The following day, the group revealed more details about their EP titled The Story Begins, posting a picture of the album's track list revealing six songs in total. On October 12, the group released individual teaser videos featuring Nayeon, Momo, and Mina, which depicted certain notable characteristics or personalities of each member. In each of their respective videos, zombies made an unexpected but short appearance. Later on the same day, individual teaser photos of the three members were uploaded. On October 13, individual teaser photos of Sana, Chaeyoung, and Tzuyu were released. The following day, teaser photos for Jeongyeon, Jihyo, and Dahyun were uploaded.

On October 15, the group uploaded two teaser images featuring all the members. On October 16, they uploaded a music video teaser clip revealing a part of their choreography for "Like Ooh-Ahh". The members were depicted to be dancing in the middle of a zombie horde. On October 17, Twice uploaded an instrumental video featuring audio snippets for all tracks in the EP. A day before the release of their album, the group held a live countdown broadcast on V Live.

The Story Begins and its lead single "Like Ooh-Ahh" were officially released on October 20.

== Composition ==
The Story Begins is an EP consisting of six tracks. "Like Ooh-Ahh" is produced by Black Eyed Pilseung, who had previously worked with other artists under JYP Entertainment including Miss A and Got7. The song was sonically described as a color pop track which incorporates various genres such as hip hop, R&B, and rock. The second track "Do It Again" was written by Park Jin-young, lyrically describing the excitement one feels after receiving a confession of love from another person, and was previously performed by Twice in Sixteen. "Going Crazy" is another song that was first performed by the group during Sixteen, and lyrically talks about uncontrollable feelings due to infatuation. The song "Truth" is classified as a song incorporating dance-pop, punk, and ballad, and was also performed during Sixteen. "Candy Boy" is described to be a love song, with the song's lyrics depicting how a person can meet their loved one even in dreams. The album's closing track "Like a Fool" is an acoustic song that tells about a girl's heartache after being unable to confess to their romantic interest.

== Promotion ==
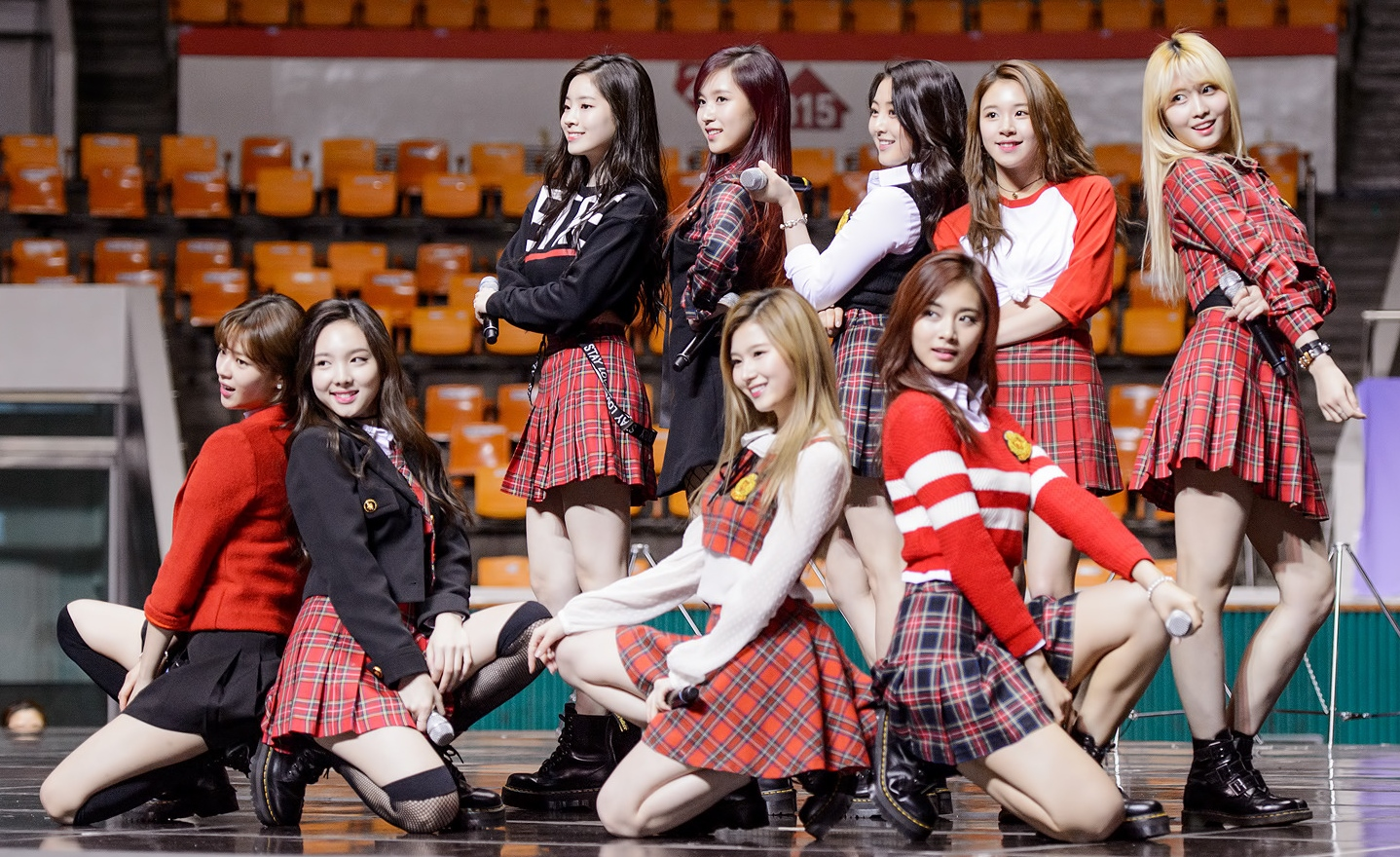
Twice performing at Seoul Arts College in February 2016

On the same day as the release of The Story Begins, Twice held their debut showcase titled "Ooh-Ahh, Twice" at the AX-Korea in Gwangjin-gu, Seoul, wherein they performed "Like Ooh-Ahh" alongside the dance tracks "Going Crazy" and "Do It Again". The showcase was also broadcast live through V Live.

Twice promoted their album by appearing and performing on several South Korean music programs. The group made their first-ever music show appearance on M Countdown on October 22, performing "Like Ooh-Ahh" and "Do It Again". This was followed by performances on KBS2's Music Bank on October 23, MBC's Show! Music Core on October 24, and on SBS' Inkigayo on October 25, among other performance dates. The group also made their appearance on the SBS Gayo Daejeon 2015 held on December 27, performing "Like Ohh-Ahh".

Twice performed "Candy Boy" for the first time on M Countdown on January 7, 2016. On January 22, they performed "Like Ooh-Ahh" alongside a cover of Miss A's "Bad Girl Good Girl" and Wonder Girls' "So Hot" on You Hee-Yeol's Sketchbook. On April 24, the group performed at the KCON Japan 2016 in a special broadcast done by M Countdown.

== Commercial performance ==
The Story Begins debuted at number four on the Gaon Album Chart for the week ending October 24, 2015, and peaked at number three two weeks later. By the end of October, the EP sold a total of 17,100 physical copies. At the end of 2015, the album reached 49,904 copies sold. As of 2020, the album has sold 199,696 copies in South Korea and 47,448 copies in Japan. As of May 2019, it was the group's best selling album in the United States with 4,000 copies sold.

== Legacy ==
On October 19, 2016, Twice revealed their official light stick dubbed "Candy Bong" (bong meaning stick in Korean), inspired by the song "Candy Boy".

== Track listing ==
The Story Begins — Standard edition
No.	Title	Lyrics	Music	Arrangement	Length
1.	"Like Ooh-Ahh" (Ooh-Ahh하게; Ooh-Ahh hage)	Black Eyed Pilseung; Sam Lewis	Black Eyed Pilseung; Lewis	Rado	3:35
2.	"Do It Again" (다시 해줘; Dasi haejwo)	J.Y. Park "The Asiansoul"	Glen Choi (DJ Nüre); Fingazz	Fingazz	3:26
3.	"Going Crazy" (미쳤나봐; Micheonnabwa)	Daniel Kim; Kebee	Jake K; 220; Sophia Pae; Sam Gray	Jake K; 220	3:01
4.	"Truth"	Jin-suk Choi	Anne Judith Wik; Nermin Harambašić; Tatiauna Matthews; Xin Xin Gao; J. Choi	J. Choi	3:33
5.	"Candy Boy"	Kim Eun-soo	Ryan Marrone; Julia Michaels; Chloe Leighton; Garrick Smith	Marrone; Michaels; Leighton; Smith	2:46
6.	"Like a Fool"	Daniel Kim	D. Kim; Mayu Wakisaka	D. Kim	3:34
Total length:					20:03

The Story Begins — Taiwan edition bonus DVD
No.	Title	Length
1.	"Like Ooh-Ahh" (Music Video)
2.	"Like Ooh-Ahh" (Music Video Behind)
3.	"Like Ooh-Ahh" (Teaser Behind)
4.	"The Story Begins" (Jacket Making Film)
5.	"Special Video 'I'" (娜璉Nayeon)
6.	"Special Video 'I'" (定延Jeongyeon)
7.	"Special Video 'I'" (Momo)
8.	"Special Video 'I'" (Sana)
9.	"Special Video 'I'" (志效Jihyo)
10.	"Special Video 'I'" (Mina)
11.	"Special Video 'I'" (多賢Dahyun)
12.	"Special Video 'I'" (彩瑛Chaeyoung)
13.	"Special Video 'I'" (子瑜Tzuyu)

== Content production ==
Credits adapted from album liner notes

Locations

- Recorded, engineered and mixed at JYPE Studios, Seoul, South Korea
- Mastered at The Mastering Palace, New York City, New York and Suono Mastering, Seoul, South Korea

Personnel

- Jimmy Jeong – executive producer
- Jo Hae-seong – executive producer
- J. Y. Park "The Asiansoul" – producer
- Black Eyed Pilseung – co-producer
- Kim Yong-woon "goodear" – recording and mixing engineer
- Jo Han-sol "fabiotheasian" – recording and assistant mixing engineer
- Choi Hye-jin – recording engineer
- Han Cheol-gyu – assistant recording engineer
- Lee Tae-seob – mixing engineer
- Dave Kutch – mastering engineer
- Choi Hyo-young – mastering engineer
- Go Ji-seon – assistant mastering engineer
- Yoon Hee-so – choreographer
- Kim Hye-rang – choreographer
- Choi Hee-seon – stylist
- Im Ji-young – stylist
- Park Nae-joo – hair director
- Won Jeong-yo – makeup director
- Jo Dae-young – album design
- Kim Ah-mi – album design
- Kim Young-jo (Naive Creative Production) – music video director
- Yoo Seung-woo (Naive Creative Production) – music video director
- Jang Deok-hwa – photographer
- Rado – all instruments and computer programming (on "Like Ooh-Ahh")
- Jihyo – background vocals (on "Like Ooh-Ahh", "Going Crazy", "Truth", "Candy Boy" and "Like a Fool")
- Fingazz – all instruments and computer programming (on "Do It Again")
- Daniel Kim – vocal producer (on "Do It Again" and "Candy Boy"), mixing engineer (on "Going Crazy" and "Like a Fool"), background vocals (on "Candy Boy") and all instruments, computer programming and guitars (on "Like a Fool")
- Twice – background vocals (on "Do It Again")
- Kebee – rap director (on "Going Crazy")
- 220 – synthesizer and drums (on "Going Crazy")
- Jake K – synthesizer (on "Going Crazy")
- Choi Jin-seok – all instruments and computer programming (on "Truth")
- Ryan Marrone – all instruments and computer programming (on "Candy Boy")
- Julia Michaels – all instruments and computer programming (on "Candy Boy")
- Chloe Leighton – all instruments and computer programming (on "Candy Boy")
- Garrick Smith – all instruments and computer programming (on "Candy Boy")

== Charts ==
=== Weekly charts ===
Chart (2015–19)	Peak position
Japanese Albums (Oricon)	43
South Korean Albums (Gaon)	3
US World Albums (Billboard)	15

=== Year-end charts ===
Chart (2015)	Position
South Korean Albums (Gaon)	49

Chart (2016)	Position
South Korean Albums (Gaon)	58

== Release history ==
Release dates and formats for The Story Begins
Region	Date	Format(s)	Edition	Label	Ref.
Various	October 20, 2015	Digital download; streaming	Standard	JYP	
South Korea	October 20, 2015	CD	Standard	JYP	
Taiwan	December 11, 2015	CD + DVD	Taiwan	JYP; Universal Music Taiwan	
Thailand	February 12, 2016	CD	Thailand	JYP; BEC-Tero Music	
