= Masterpiece (EP) =

2023 extended play by MiSaMo

- Regular edition cover

EP by MiSaMo
- Released: July 26, 2023
- Genre: J-pop
- Length: 22:23
- Language: Japanese
- Label: Warner Japan

MiSaMo chronology
| Masterpiece (2023) | Haute Couture (2024) |

Singles from Masterpiece
- 1. "Marshmallow" Released: June 16, 2023; 2. "Do Not Touch" Released: July 14, 2023

Masterpiece is the debut extended play by MiSaMo, a sub unit of girl group Twice. It was released by Warner Music Japan on July 26, 2023. The EP contains seven tracks, including the lead single "Do Not Touch" and pre-released single "Marshmallow".

== Background ==
Momo, Sana, and Mina released the song "Bouquet" for TV Asahi's television series Liaison: Kodomo no Kokoro Shinryōjo on January 25, 2023. On February 9, JYP Entertainment announced that the trio would debut as MiSaMo with an extended play of six tracks, including "Bouquet", on July 26. On June 14, they confirmed Masterpiece as the title and revealed the tracklist, which now included seven songs. "Marshmallow" was pre-released digitally on June 16, alongside its music video. The lead single, "Do Not Touch", was pre-released digitally on July 14 with an accompanying music video.

== Composition ==
When we are releasing as Twice, all the music in those albums represent things we wanted to express and could only say as Twice...With MiSaMo, we really wanted to show the type of music that only the three of us could do and something we couldn't release as Twice members until now.

— Sana and Mina, in an interview with NME

Masterpiece was in development for over a year, with MiSaMo contributing to the sound and creative concept of the album. In an interview with NME, they revealed that R&B track "Do Not Touch" was chosen as the lead single after "days of agonising over whether or not it was the right choice", and the vocals were recorded right before the North American leg of Twice's Ready to Be World Tour. The lyrics, written by Park Jin-young and Mayu Wakisaka, are a play on the phrase "do not touch" often displayed near works of art in museums, and highlight the importance of consent and boundaries in relationships. Jazz-inspired "Behind the Curtain" was not originally part of the track list, and was added later because it would be a great opening song for MiSaMo's debut showcase. "Marshmallow", the pre-release single, is a chill song with hip hop elements and positive lyrics that encourage self-love.

Each member co-wrote lyrics for a track on the EP, with Momo choosing "Funny Valentine" because she could imagine a performance stage with the song. Mina's lyrics for "It's Not Easy for You" were inspired by comments from fans, and the song is about "being totally obsessed with something, like being stuck in a swamp". Sana was inspired by Twice's "Cry for Me" (2020) when writing the lyrics for "Rewind You", a melancholy R&B song. The closing track, "Bouquet", conveys the positive message of "it's okay to be me".

== Promotion ==
To promote the EP, MiSaMo performed "Do Not Touch" on TV Asahi's Music Station, on July 21. All seven tracks from the EP were performed during the group's debut showcase, MiSaMo Japan Showcase "Masterpiece", held in Osaka and Yokohama over five days with a total audience of 40,000 fans. On August 19, the group performed "Behind the Curtain", "Marshmallow", and "Do Not Touch" on Venue101 Presents MiSaMo Masterpiece Show, a special live broadcast of NHK's music program Venue101.

== Commercial performance ==
Masterpiece debuted at number 1 on the weekly Oricon Albums Chart with 154,880 copies sold. This was the highest first week album sales for a female artist in 2023. The EP also topped the Billboard Japan Hot Albums chart, selling 200,986 copies and 1,529 downloads. Data from SoundScan Japan revealed that the amount of albums sold in the Kansai region was greater than the typical percentage (23.4%, compared to the average of 16.9%), likely due to the fact that Momo, Sana, and Mina are from Kyoto, Osaka, and Hyōgo prefectures, respectively.

== Track listing ==
Masterpiece track listing
| No. | Title | Lyrics | Music | Arrangement | Length |
|---|---|---|---|---|---|
| 1. | "Do Not Touch" | J. Y. Park "The Asiansoul"; Mayu Wakisaka | Hyuk Shin (153/Joombas); Ashley Alisha (153/Joombas); MRey (153/Joombas) | MRey | 3:05 |
| 2. | "Behind the Curtain" | Yun So-young (153/Joombas); Yuki Kokobo | Alysa; JJean; Justin Reinstein | Alysa | 2:58 |
| 3. | "Marshmallow" | Shoko Fujibayashi | Rasmus Gregersen; Daniel Michael Victor; Julie Aagaard; Yu Hyuk | Gregersen; Victor | 3:02 |
| 4. | "Funny Valentine" | Momo; Yuka Matsumoto; Realmeee; Ejae | Realmeee; Ejae; Scott Bruzenak | Realmeee; Ejae; Bruzenak | 3:17 |
| 5. | "It's Not Easy for You" | Mina; Risa Horie | Nicolas Farmakalidis (Number K); Rachel West; Carly Gibert | NicoTheOwl (Number K) | 2:20 |
| 6. | "Rewind You" | Sana; Ayushy (The Hub); Frankie Day (The Hub); Charlotte Wilson; Chanti (The Hub) | Ayushy; Day; Wilson; Chanti; MarkAlong; Brian U (The Hub) | MarkAlong; Brian U | 3:17 |
| 7. | "Bouquet" | Katsuhiko Yamamoto | Yamamoto | Takashi Fukuda; Yamamoto | 4:24 |
| Total length: | | | | | 22:23 |

Deluxe edition DVD
| No. | Title | Length |
|---|---|---|
| 1. | "Masterpiece" (Jacket Shooting Making Movie) |
| 2. | "Bouquet" (Making Music Video (full version)) |
| 3. | "Bouquet" (Making Music Video Behind Movie) |
| 4. | "Opening Trailer Making Movie" |
| 5. | "Short Film of MiSaMo in Kansai" |

Mina edition DVD
| No. | Title | Length |
|---|---|---|
| 1. | "It's Not Easy for You" (Q&A with lyricist Mina) |
| 2. | "Masterpiece" (Jacket Shooting Making Movie by Mina) |
| 3. | "Short Film of MiSaMo in Kansai" (Mina) |

Sana edition DVD
| No. | Title | Length |
|---|---|---|
| 1. | "Rewind" (Q&A with lyricist Sana) |
| 2. | "Masterpiece" (Jacket Shooting Making Movie by Sana) |
| 3. | "Short Film of MiSaMo in Kansai" (Sana) |

Momo edition DVD
| No. | Title | Length |
|---|---|---|
| 1. | "Funny Valentine" (Q&A with lyricist Momo) |
| 2. | "Masterpiece" (Jacket Shooting Making Movie by Momo) |
| 3. | "Short Film of MiSaMo in Kansai" (Momo) |

== Charts ==
=== Weekly charts ===
Weekly chart performance for Masterpiece
| Chart (2023) | Peak position |
|---|---|
| Japanese Albums (Oricon) | 1 |
| Japanese Combined Albums (Oricon) | 1 |
| Japanese Hot Albums (Billboard Japan) | 1 |
| UK Album Downloads (Official Charts) | 45 |

=== Monthly charts ===
Monthly chart performance for Masterpiece
| Chart (2023) | Position |
|---|---|
| Japanese Albums (Oricon) | 3 |

=== Year-end charts ===
Year-end chart performance for Masterpiece
| Chart (2023) | Position |
|---|---|
| Japanese Albums (Oricon) | 25 |
| Japanese Hot Albums (Billboard Japan) | 25 |

== Certifications ==
Certifications for Masterpiece
| Region | Certification | Certified units/sales |
|---|---|---|
| Japan (RIAJ) | Platinum | 250,000^{^} |
^{^} Shipments figures based on certification alone.
