= Doughnut (song) =

2021 song by Twice

- Digital and standard edition cover

Single by Twice

from the album Celebrate
- Language: Japanese
- B-side: "Wonderful Day"
- Released: December 15, 2021
- Genre: Ballad
- Length: 4:23
- Label: Warner Music Japan
- Composers: Alexis Kesselman; Woo S. Rhee "Rainstone"; Fingazz; Francis
- Lyricist: Lauren Kaori
- Producer: Woo S. Rhee "Rainstone"

Twice singles chronology
"Scientist" (2021)	"Doughnut" (2021)	"Celebrate" (2022)

Twice Japanese singles chronology
"Perfect World" (2021)	"Doughnut" (2021)	"Celebrate" (2022)

Music video
- "Doughnut" on YouTube

"Doughnut" is a song recorded by South Korean girl group Twice. It is the group's ninth Japanese maxi single, featuring three other tracks. It was pre-released for digital download and streaming on December 3, 2021, by Warner Music Japan as a single from their fourth Japanese studio album, Celebrate. The single and its B-side, "Wonderful Day", were physically released on December 15 in Japan.

"Doughnut" was produced by JYP Entertainment's in-house producer Woo S. Rhee "Rainstone", and was composed by Rainstone, Alexis Kesselman, Fingazz, and Francis. It is Twice's first ballad single in Japan and takes inspiration from the city pop genre. The lyrics, written by Lauren Kaori, are about "the hole left in your heart when you're missing a special person".

The single peaked at number 3 on Japan's Oricon Singles Chart and number 6 on the Billboard Japan Hot 100. It was also certified gold by the Recording Industry Association of Japan.

== Background and release ==
On October 15, 2021, shortly after the release of their first English single, "The Feels", and the announcement of their third Korean studio album, Formula of Love: O+T=<3, Twice's agency JYP Entertainment announced through a winter-themed teaser that the group would be releasing their ninth Japanese single, "Doughnut", on December 15. The song was pre-released digitally on December 3, with an accompanying music video. That same day, Twice performed the song on the Japanese television show Music Station. On December 15, the group held an online event to commemorate the release of the single, where they performed "Doughnut" and its B-side "Wonderful Day".

== Track listing ==
Digital download EP
No.	Title	Lyrics	Music	Length
1.	"Doughnut"	Lauren Kaori	Alexis Kesselman; Woo S. Rhee "Rainstone"; Fingazz; Francis	4:24
2.	"Wonderful Day"	Shoko Fujibayashi	Andrew Choi; Emily Yeonseo Kim; minGtion	3:31
3.	"Doughnut" (Instrumental)		Kesselman; Rainstone; Fingazz; Francis	4:24
4.	"Wonderful Day" (Instrumental)		Choi; Kim; minGtion	3:33
Total length:				15:52

First press limited edition A DVD
No.	Title	Length
1.	"Doughnut" (Jacket Shooting Making Movie)
2.	"Doughnut" (Jacket Member Making Video)

== Credits and personnel ==
Credits adapted from CD single liner notes

- Twice – lead vocals, background vocals
- Lauren Kaori – lyricist (on "Doughnut")
- Alexis Kesselman – composer, vocal producer (on "Doughnut")
- Woo S. Rhee "Rainstone" – composer, producer, all instruments, recording engineer, vocal director, digital editor (on "Doughnut")
- Francis – composer, co-producer, all instruments, recording engineer, digital editor (on "Doughnut")
- Fingazz – composer, co-producer, all instruments, recording engineer (on "Doughnut")
- JuHyeon Jun – strings arranger (on "Doughnut")
- Kate – background vocals (on "Doughnut")
- Dante Kim – assistant recording engineer (on "Doughnut")
- Kobee – vocal director (on "Doughnut")
- Choi Hyejin – recording engineer
- KayOne Lee – digital editor (on "Doughnut")
- Tony Maserati – mixer (on "Doughnut")
- David K. Younghyun – mixing engineer (on "Doughnut")
- Chris Gehringer – mastering engineer (on "Doughnut")
- Shoko Fujibayashi – lyricist (on "Wonderful Day")
- Andrew Choi – composer, all instruments (on "Wonderful Day")
- minGtion – composer, arranger, vocal director, digital editor (on "Wonderful Day")
- Emily Yeonseo Kim – composer (on "Wonderful Day")
- Elley – background vocals (on "Wonderful Day")
- Lee Sangyeop – recording engineer (on "Wonderful Day")
- Lim Hongjin – mixer (on "Wonderful Day")
- Kwon Namwoo – mastering engineer (on "Wonderful Day")

== Charts ==
=== Weekly charts ===
Weekly chart performance for "Doughnut"
Chart (2021)	Peak position
Japan Hot 100 (Billboard)	6
Japan (Oricon)	3

=== Year-end charts ===
Year-end chart performance for "Doughnut"
Chart (2022)	Position
Japan (Oricon)	62
Japan Top Singles Sales (Billboard Japan)	65

== Certifications ==
Certifications for "Doughnut"
Region	Certification	Certified units/sales
Japan (RIAJ)	Gold	100,000^{^}
^{^} Shipments figures based on certification alone.

== Release history ==
Release dates and formats for "Doughnut"
Country	Date	Format(s)	Edition	Label	Ref.
Various	December 3, 2021	Digital download; streaming	Standard Edition	Warner Music Japan	
Japan	December 15, 2021	CD single	Standard Edition	Warner Music Japan	
Japan	December 15, 2021	CD + DVD	Limited Edition A	Warner Music Japan	
Japan	December 15, 2021	CD	Limited Edition B	Warner Music Japan	
Japan	December 15, 2021	CD	Fan Club Limited Edition	Warner Music Japan	
