= Celebrate (Twice song) =

2022 song by Twice

Single by Twice

from the album Celebrate
- Language: Japanese
- Released: July 15, 2022
- Length: 3:08
- Label: Warner Music Japan
- Composers: Woo Min Lee "collapsedone"; Justin Reinstein; Like (MRCH); JJean
- Lyricists: J. Y. Park "The Asiansoul"; Nayeon; Jeongyeon; Momo; Sana; Jihyo; Mina; Dahyun; Chaeyoung; Tzuyu; Co-sho

Twice singles chronology
"Doughnut" (2021)	"Celebrate" (2022)	"Talk That Talk" (2022)

Twice Japanese singles chronology
"Doughnut" (2021)	"Celebrate" (2022)	"Hare Hare" (2023)

Music video
- "Celebrate" on YouTube

"Celebrate" is a song recorded by South Korean girl group Twice. It was released by Warner Music Japan on July 15, 2022, as a digital single from their fourth Japanese studio album of the same name (2022).

== Composition ==
"Celebrate" was composed by Woo Min Lee "collapsedone", Justin Reinstein, Like (MRCH), JJean, with lyrics written by J. Y. Park "The Asiansoul", all members of Twice and Co-sho. Running for 3 minutes and 8 seconds, the song is composed in the key of G major with a tempo of 112 beats per minute.

== Music video ==
In July 2022, two teasers for the music video of "Celebrate" were released. On July 15, 2022, the music video was published on YouTube.

== Live performances ==
On July 22, 2022, Twice performed "Celebrate" for the first time on Music Station. The next day, they performed the song on Venue101 Presents Twice 5th Anniversary, a special live broadcast of NHK's music program Venue101. They also performed the song during Twice Japan Fan Meeting 2022 "Once Day", held in Tokyo and Osaka for five days in October. A performance video from this event was uploaded to YouTube on December 28. On December 31, Twice performed "Celebrate" on NHK's New Year's Eve television special, Kōhaku Uta Gassen.

== Commercial performance ==
On the week of July 20, 2022, "Celebrate" debuted at number 58 on the Billboard Japan Hot 100. It rose to number twelve on the week of July 27, 2022. The song eventually peaked at number ten the following week of August 3, 2022.

In South Korea, the song debuted on the Circle Download Chart at number 174, on the week of July 24, 2022 to July 30, 2022.

== Track listing ==
- Digital download / streaming
1. "Celebrate" – 3:08

== Personnel ==
Credits adapted from Melon.

- Twice – lyricist, vocals
- J. Y. Park "The Asiansoul" – lyricist
- Co-sho – lyricist
- Woo Min Lee "collapsedone" – arrangement, composer
- Justin Reinstein – arrangement, composer
- Like (MRCH) – composer
- JJean – composer

== Charts ==
Weekly chart performance for "Celebrate"
Chart (2022)	Peak position
Global Excl. U.S (Billboard)	154
Japan Hot 100 (Billboard)	10
Japan Combined Singles (Oricon)	11
South Korea Download (Circle)	174

== Certifications ==
Streaming certifications for "Celebrate"
Region	Certification	Certified units/sales
Japan (RIAJ)	Platinum	100,000,000^{†}
^{†} Streaming-only figures based on certification alone.

== Release history ==
Release dates and formats for "Celebrate"
Country	Date	Format(s)	Label	Ref.
Worldwide	July 15, 2022	Digital download; streaming	Warner Music Japan	
