= Haute Couture (EP) =

2024 extended play by MiSaMo

- Digital and standard edition cover

EP by MiSaMo
- Released: November 6, 2024
- Genre: J-pop
- Length: 29:15
- Languages: Japanese; English
- Label: Warner Japan

MiSaMo chronology
Masterpiece (2023)	Haute Couture (2024)	Play (2026)

Singles from Haute Couture
- 1. "New Look" Released: October 9, 2024; 2. "Identity" Released: October 28, 2024

Haute Couture is the second extended play by MiSaMo, a sub-unit of girl group Twice. It was released by Warner Music Japan on November 6, 2024. The EP contains seven tracks, including the lead single, "Identity", and "New Look", a cover of Namie Amuro's song of the same name. Each member of MiSaMo also has a solo song, available as bonus tracks on some editions of the EP.

== Background and release ==
On July 30, 2024, JYP Entertainment announced that MiSaMo would release their second EP on October 30. On September 12, the release date was changed to November 6 due to production issues. They also announced a Japanese dome tour in support of the EP. On September 16, a trailer prologue video, "MiSaMo's Atelier", was released on YouTube, revealing the EP's title and theme, centering around "the stylish idea of how haute couture dresses are made by the hands of fashion masters".

The EP has six editions: a standard edition, limited deluxe edition, Once Japan limited edition, and solo editions featuring each member. The track list was revealed on September 22, showing that Park Jin-young wrote lyrics for the lead single, "Identity", and MiSaMo wrote lyrics for their own solo tracks. The sub-lead track, a cover of Namie Amuro's "New Look" (2008), was released on October 9 with an accompanying music video directed by Song Min-gyu. "Identity" was released on October 28 along with a music video, which was filmed on location in Spain at the City of Arts and Sciences and the Old Cathedral of Lleida.

== Promotion ==
To promote the EP, MiSaMo performed "Identity" and "New Look" on the music television program CDTV Live! Live! on October 28, 2024. Both songs were also performed on the year-end music special Music Station Super Live 2024 on December 27. MiSaMo's Japanese dome tour in support of the EP was held at Belluna Dome on November 2–3, Kyocera Dome Osaka on November 16–17, and Tokyo Dome on January 15–16, 2025. The second concerts in both Osaka and Tokyo had live viewings in movie theaters in Japan, and were broadcast live via the streaming service Lemino.

== Track listing ==
Haute Couture – standard edition track listing
No.	Title	Lyrics	Music	Arrangement	Length
1.	"Identity"	J.Y. Park "The Asiansoul"; 4Season (153/Joombas); Masami Kakinuma (Relic Lyric)	Wilhelmina; Willow Kayne; Jacob Attwooll	Attwooll	2:20
2.	"Runway"	Rose Blueming	Lukas Hällgren; Adam Ben Yahia; Malin Johansson	L. Hällgren	2:43
3.	"Wah Wah Wah"	Itsuka; Hiyori Nara	Miwaflower; Willie Weeks	Weeks	3:07
4.	"Baby, I'm Good"	Kakinuma	Ejae; Aaron Kim	A. Kim	2:59
5.	"Daydream"	Rose Blueming	Trippy; Mayu Wakisaka; JJean	Trippy	2:45
6.	"New Look"	Eddie Holland; Brian Holland; Lamont Dozier; Michico	E. Holland; B. Holland; Dozier; T.Kura; Michico	Yoshi	3:16
7.	"Jealousy"	Sorano	Kim Juhyeong; Tim Tan; Ciara Muscat	Kim J.	3:19
Total length:					20:29

Bonus tracks (Note: All ten tracks are available on the digital EP and the Once Japan limited edition. The member solo editions have eight tracks each (seven standard tracks plus the member's solo track).)
No.	Title	Lyrics	Music	Arrangement	Length
8.	"Misty" (Mina solo)	Mina; Gratia	Tommy Park; Antti Oikarinen; Boran; Hautboi Rich	Park; Oikarinen	3:14
9.	"Money in My Pocket" (Momo solo)	Momo; Sofia Vivere; Yu-ki Kokubo	Jon Hällgren; L. Hällgren; Sofia Vivere	J. Hällgren; L. Hällgren	2:29
10.	"Mirage" (Sana solo)	Sana; Hiyori Nara	Dainasaurs; Avenue 52	Avenue 52	3:00
Total length:					29:15

Limited deluxe edition DVD
No.	Title	Length
1.	"Masterpiece" (Opening Trailer – Mina)
2.	"Masterpiece" (Opening Trailer – Sana)
3.	"Masterpiece" (Opening Trailer – Momo)
4.	"Masterpiece" (Opening Trailer – MiSaMo)
5.	"Marshmallow" (Music Video)
6.	"Do Not Touch" (Music Video)
7.	"Haute Couture" (Jacket Shooting Making Movie)
8.	"Haute Couture" (Jacket Self-Making Movie)

== Charts ==
=== Weekly charts ===
Weekly chart performance for Haute Couture
Chart (2024)	Peak position
Japanese Albums (Oricon)	2
Japanese Combined Albums (Oricon)	2
Japanese Hot Albums (Billboard Japan)	2

=== Monthly charts ===
Monthly chart performance for Haute Couture
Chart (2024)	Position
Japanese Albums (Oricon)	6

=== Year-end charts ===
2024 year-end chart performance for Haute Couture
Chart (2024)	Position
Japanese Albums (Oricon)	27
Japanese Hot Albums (Billboard Japan)	37

2025 year-end chart performance for Haute Couture
Chart (2025)	Position
Japanese Albums (Oricon)	91
Japanese Hot Albums (Billboard Japan)	73

== Certifications ==
Certifications for Haute Couture
Region	Certification	Certified units/sales
Japan (RIAJ) Physical	Platinum	250,000^{^}
^{^} Shipments figures based on certification alone.
