= Sixteen (TV program) =

Reality girl group survival show

- Logo
- Created by: JYP Entertainment
- Presented by: Park Jin-young
- Country of origin: South Korea
- Original language: Korean
- No. of seasons: 1
- No. of episodes: 10

Production
- Production companies: JYP Entertainment; CJ E&M; Koen Media

Original release
- Network: Mnet
- Release: May 5 – July 7, 2015

Sixteen (stylized in all caps; Korean: 식스틴) is a 2015 reality girl group survival show created by JYP Entertainment and Mnet. The show pitted sixteen trainees against one another to secure a spot in the girl group Twice. Sixteen contestants were assessed not just by their singing and dancing abilities but also their charisma and personality. The show ran from May 5 to July 7 on Mnet for ten episodes.

== Pre-show promotions ==
Starting on April 13, 2015, JYP Entertainment (JYPE) began releasing profiles of the 16 candidates through Mnet's channel and the official Sixteen YouTube channel. The contestants were revealed to include two Japanese trainees, one Japanese-American trainee, one Thai trainee, one Korean-Canadian trainee, one Taiwanese trainee and eleven Korean trainees. Some insight on the show's format was given, revealing that seven of the show's contestants were already candidates for the new girl group, while the remaining nine would seek to replace them in the final line-up.

=== List of contestants ===
#	Name	Date of birth
1	Im Na-yeon (임나연)	September 22, 1995
2	Yoo Jeong-yeon (유정연)	November 1, 1996
3	Momo Hirai (平井 もも)	November 9, 1996
4	Sana Minatozaki (湊崎 紗夏)	December 29, 1996
5	Park Ji-hyo (박지효)	February 1, 1997
6	Mina Myōi (名井 南)	March 24, 1997
7	Song Min-young (송민영)	February 27, 1998
8	Park Ji-won (박지원)	March 20, 1998
9	Kim Da-hyun (김다현)	May 28, 1998
10	Son Chae-young (손채영)	April 23, 1999
11	Chou Tzu-yu (周子瑜)	June 14, 1999
12	Lee Chae-yeon (이채연)	January 11, 2000
13	Kim Eun-suh (김은서)	November 14, 2000
14	Jeon So-mi (전소미)	March 9, 2001
15	Lee Chae-ryeong (이채령)	June 5, 2001
16	Natty (Ahnatchaya Suputhipong) (나띠, นัตตี้)	May 30, 2002

== Episodes ==
=== Episode 1 (May 5, 2015) ===
The contestants are introduced and divided into two groups: Majors and Minors. This first group division is decided purely by JYPE's A&R team, and not by Park Jin-young. The Majors are the members currently on track to debut in the new girl group and will be treated like true JYPE stars, including living in a nice dorm, riding in a van, receiving pointers from current JYPE stars, and practicing from 9:00 to 21:00. The Minors are to live like trainees in a dirty dorm and are disadvantaged by a 21:00 to 9:00 practice time. The members of the Major and Minor groups will change as the contestants complete missions and show their skills. Once divided, Park Jin-young issued the girls the First Mission "Are you a Star?" which challenged them to prove that they had star potential. Contestants could freely choose what they wanted to show, but Park wanted to "see their ability to become a star or be able to feel that [they] are meant to be a star". During this mission, Park showed favor to those who thought outside of the box and showcased themselves rather than their talents, saying "It's great to have talents, but that talent must be yours. I told you to show me why you are a star; I never said to show me that you can sing or dance". No one was eliminated in this episode.

=== Episode 2 (May 12, 2015) ===
Based on the performances seen in the first episode, Natty, Chaeryeong, Somi, Sana, and Jihyo replaced Momo, Jiwon, Mina, Minyoung, and Nayeon in the Majors line up, respectively. No one was eliminated based on the first mission. The girls' next mission was "Album Jacket Cover", which challenged them to focus and produce high-quality photos in less-than-ideal conditions. Majors were allowed to shop for designers clothes for the photoshoot and decided on a dark, yet youthful vampire concept, while Minors were sent to a street market and designed a fresh concept inspired by Wonder Girls. The results of the photo shoot exposed the strengths and weaknesses of the girls, revealing the natural charms of some and the struggles of others.

=== Episode 3 (May 19, 2015) ===
Due to their performance in the photoshoot mission, Mina, Tzuyu and Jeongyeon replaced Chaeryeong, Jihyo, and Dahyun in the Major line up, respectively. Chaeyeon is eliminated from the competition because Park Jin-young observed that her inexperience and desire to do well obscured her natural charm and made her appear cold and stiff in the photos. However, he explains that this will be a good learning experience for her on her journey to stardom and concludes by telling her "you worked hard". The third mission, 1:1 Battle, is announced and results in Nayeon and Chaeryeong returning to Major status by replacing Tzuyu and Sana. The final Major line up for this episode is Nayeon, Chaeyoung, Somi, Mina, Chaeryeong, Natty, and Jeongyeon. However, the battles involving Somi, Minyoung, Mina, Eunsuh, Chaeyoung, Jihyo, Momo, and Natty will air the next episode, leaving their final fates unknown this week.

=== Episode 4 (May 26, 2015) ===
The results of the remaining one-on-one battles are revealed. Somi, Mina, and Natty remain Majors, while Minyoung, Eunsuh, and Momo remain Minors. Jihyo replaces Chaeyoung in the Majors lineup, sending her to Minors. Eunsuh is eliminated from the competition because she forgot her choreography in the middle of her stage. The contestants' next mission is to be a group challenge between minor and major teams. The teams are divided into Major A (Mina, Nayeon, Chaeryeong, Jeongyeon), Major B (Natty, Somi, Jihyo), Minor A (Momo, Jiwon, Chaeyoung), and Minor B (Tzuyu, Minyoung, Dahyun, Sana). The match-ups are revealed to be Major A vs. Minor B and Major B vs. Minor A. The winning teams will make up the new Major lineup. The losing teams then will compete against each other. The losers of the second battle will be up for elimination. The girls are shown preparing for the competition, but no match-ups were shown in this episode.

=== Episode 5 (June 2, 2015) ===
The girls prepare for their group battles, choosing performance outfits and rehearsing. The competition stage is held before a live studio audience, whose votes will determine the winners of each battle. Major A performed Pharrell's "Happy" against Minor B's performance of "Problem" by Ariana Grande. Major B hit the stage with Mark Ronson's smash hit "Uptown Funk" against Minor A's performance of "The Way You Love Me" by Keri Hilson. Based on audience votes, Major A loses to Minor B (189 points to 203 points). Tzuyu, Minyoung, Dahyun, and Sana move up to the Majors lineup, while Mina, Nayeon, Chaeryeong, and Jeongyeon fall to the Minors. Major B of Natty, Somi, and Jihyo remain in the Majors lineup as they win against Minor A (202 points to 182 points). The losing teams, Major A and Minor A will compete against each other; the losers of the second battle will be up for elimination. The results of the match-up will not be revealed until the next episode. The final Major line up for this episode is Tzuyu, Minyoung, Dahyun, Sana, Natty, Somi, and Jihyo.

=== Episode 6 (June 9, 2015) ===
For the loser's battle, Major A is renamed Minor A, and Minor A is renamed Minor B. Minor A (Nayeon, Chaeryeong, Mina, and Jeongyeon) performed Lee Hyori's "U-Go-Girl" while Minor B (Chaeyoung, Jiwon, and Momo) chose Park Jin-young's "Swing Baby". Although Park praised the performances of both groups, he and the audience both chose Minor A's performance as the winner (although the final decision was only based on the audience's vote). This placed Chaeyoung, Jiwon, and Momo in danger of elimination. In the end, Momo was eliminated because of the votes from the viewers at home. The Major lineup is asked by Park to dance with him in an upcoming performance. While practicing with them, he gives the girls many tips about the dance and how to be successful dancers and performers. After the performance, the girls are taken to "Variety, Camp", where the girls get a lesson in variety show charms from MCs Shin Bong-sun and Heo Kyung-hwan. In the previews for the next episode, it is revealed that the next elimination will be based on votes from the contestants themselves.

=== Episode 7 (June 16, 2015) ===
After completing Variety Camp, Park gathers the girls together and announces that the mission will be member elections, where they will cast private votes on the Major and Minor line-ups. The results of the votes are revealed and Dahyun, Somi, and Natty are replaced by Nayeon, Chaeyoung, and Jeongyeon. However, Park reveals there is no elimination for this mission. The girls are once again divided into four teams for their next mission, "Create Your Own Live Showcase". The teams will prepare a performance as well as be responsible for promoting the show. Major A (Jihyo, Chaeyoung, Minyoung, Sana) prepared a slow, sexy version of Wonder Girls' "Nobody"; Major B (Nayeon, Jeongyeon, Tzuyu) chose to perform miss A's "Hush"; Minor A (Dahyun, Jiwon, Chaeryeong) also chose to emulate Wonder Girls with "Tell Me"; finally, Minor B (Mina, Somi, Natty) created a reinterpretation of JYP's "Who's Your Mama?". The song battles will be revealed in the next episode.

=== Episode 8 (June 23, 2015) ===
The girls rush through the streets of Seoul promoting the concert and handing out colored balls (Major A - Red; Major B - Yellow; Minor A - Green; Minor B - Blue). Before the show starts, attendees will place the ball in the correct group's bin to show which team did the best job promoting the show. The team that gets most of their balls back will be safe in the Major line up. After the performances, audience members are given white balls to vote for the performance they liked the best out of all four on their way out. This vote will determine the other members of the Major team. The girls are gathered by Park to announce the results. He begins by explaining that the team he builds will not be based solely on talent but also on passion, as those with passion for what they do are the ones who are most successful. Jihyo, Sana, Minyoung, and Chaeyoung are the first to make the Major lineup, with the greatest number of attendees (194) returning red balls. Before announcing the results of the audience's choice, Park states that Major B's performance stood out to him the most, calling their performance an A+. The results of the public's choice and the next elimination will be announced in the next episode.

=== Episode 9 (June 30, 2015) ===
Park reveals that Major A also ranked first within the audience votes, with Minor B in second, thus moving Somi, Mina, and Natty up to Major and bumping Nayeon, Jeongyeon, and Tzuyu down to Minor. In the last place, Jiwon, Chaeryeong, and Dahyun were put in danger of elimination. He decides to eliminate Jiwon due to her off-beat dancing and unstable vocals while performing. He announces that the girls' last mission will be to become a real girl group onstage. He divides them into two groups of six, but due to Minor lacking in numbers, they are given the advantage of choosing someone from the other team to perform with them. Although she will still be a part of, Major, Jihyo is chosen to perform along with the Minor team. He then gives the girls their new songs for the final mission's first round, explaining that teams were assigned songs that they would normally be bad at - the rhythmical "I Think I'm Crazy" for Major and the vocally-oriented "Truth" for Minor. He then reveals "Do It Again", which both groups will be performing in the final round and serves as a representation of Twice's musical direction. While preparing for the final mission, the, Major and Minor team are visited and mentored by Miss A's Fei and 2PM's Jun. K respectively. After the performances, the girls receive praises from, Park, who chooses Minor as having given the better performance for the round.

=== Episode 10 (July 7, 2015) ===
The girls prepare for the final showcase, where the Major and Minor teams will perform "Do It Again" back to back. The teams spend one last night together reminiscing on their journey throughout the show, laughing at each other's silly moments, and sharing their heartaches and hopes. After the final performances, the girls receive praises from, Park. Chaeyeon, Eunsuh, Momo, and Jiwon join the final contestants on stage for a farewell performance before the results are announced. The finalists are gathered on stage where the Major team turns in their necklaces. Nayeon, Jeongyeon, and Dahyun take the place of Natty, Somi, and Minyoung in Major lineup, respectively, thus eliminating them alongside Tzuyu and Chaeryeong. Park then throws in a twist, announcing that Twice will be a nine-member group. Along with the current Major line up (Nayeon, Jihyo, Mina, Dahyun, Jeongyeon, Chaeyoung, and Sana), he chooses Tzuyu to join. He then surprises the contestants and the audience by announcing that Momo, who was eliminated in the fourth mission, will be the final member of Twice. Tzuyu is added from the audience's opinion through online voting and Momo from the A&R Team and the Trainers' decision. The group's final line up is: Nayeon, Jeongyeon, Momo, Sana, Jihyo, Mina, Dahyun, Chaeyoung, and Tzuyu.

== Controversy ==
Controversy arose during the show as it was deemed as "emotional abuse" to the contestants. The public claimed it was "cruel" to those on the show.

Controversy arose again in the final episode when Momo, a previously eliminated contestant, was brought back to the final line up of Twice. Fans became skeptical of the motivations behind this decision. Later, a representative from JYPE stated that "Momo is exceptional in dance and performance. We believed that she will be a great addition to really complete Twice".

The next day after the final episode, JYPE had released a short statement about the addition of Tzuyu and Momo into the final lineup of Twice: "We apologize for failing to clearly communicate the selection process, and we'd like to explain it in detail once again. The condition to be chosen as a final member was the votes made by the audience and viewers. However, leading up to the final episode, we thought that the seven members selected officially may leave something to be desired. So, in addition to the seven, we decided that one member would be added solely from the viewer's opinions (Tzuyu) and one from solely Park Jin-young's opinion (Momo)".

== Ranking ==
The following table shows the ranking positions of Sixteen contestants, and their outcome.

Rankings of contestants
Final Pos.	Name	By A&R Team	1st (Are You A Star?)	2nd (Jacket Cover)	3rd (1:1)	4th (Group)	Members Election	5th (Showcase)	Final Outcome
1.	Nayeon	Major	Minor	Minor	Major	Minor	Major	Minor	Winner
2.	Jeongyeon (Note: Also credited as "Jungyeon".)	Minor	Minor	Major	Major	Minor	Major	Minor	Winner
3.	Dahyun	Major	Major	Minor	Minor	Major	Minor	Minor	Winner
4.	Mina	Major	Minor	Major	Major	Minor	Minor	Major	Winner
5.	Sana	Minor	Major	Major	Minor	Major	Major	Major	Winner
6.	Chaeyoung	Major	Major	Major	Minor	Minor	Major	Major	Winner
7.	Jihyo	Minor	Major	Minor	Major	Major	Major	Major (Note: Due to Major having 7 members and Minor having 5, Jihyo was selected by the Minor team to join while still being in Major.)	Winner
8.	Tzuyu	Minor	Minor	Major	Minor	Major	Major	Minor	Added (Note: Despite their elimination, Momo and Tzuyu were added to the group.)
9.	Minyoung	Major	Minor	Minor	Minor	Major	Major	Major	Eliminated
10.	Somi	Minor	Major	Major	Major	Major	Minor	Major	Eliminated
11.	Natty	Minor	Major	Major	Major	Major	Minor	Major	Eliminated
12.	Chaeryeong	Minor	Major	Minor	Major	Minor	Minor	Minor	Eliminated
13.	Jiwon	Major	Minor	Minor	Minor	Minor	Minor	Eliminated	Did not participate
14.	Momo	Major	Minor	Minor	Minor	Eliminated	Did not participate	Did not participate	Added
15.	Eunsuh	Minor	Minor	Minor	Eliminated	Did not participate	Did not participate	Did not participate	Did not participate
16.	Chaeyeon	Minor	Minor	Eliminated	Did not participate	Did not participate	Did not participate	Did not participate	Did not participate

== Aftermath ==
Twice went on to debut with their first single "Like Ooh-Ahh" on October 20, 2015.

After the show ended, Jiwon chose to leave the agency and pursue her talents elsewhere.

Shortly after Jiwon's departure, Minyoung became the second member of Sixteen to leave JYPE. She said, "I will be pursuing my dreams somewhere else. I haven't given up. While I was at [JYPE], I wanted to communicate with the fans, but I was frustrated because I couldn't. I wanted to say that I got all of the gifts you sent me...I am really thankful; they were a great source of strength for me".

In early 2016, Somi competed in the Mnet reality girl group survival series Produce 101, which premiered on January 22. She finished in first place, and debuted and promoted with the show's project girl group I.O.I for less than a year. On August 20, 2018, JYPE released an official statement on their website that Somi has terminated her contract and left the company. Later in September 2018, she signed an exclusive contract with YG Entertainment's sub-label The Black Label, where she debuted as a solo artist with her title track "Birthday" in June 2019.

In 2017, Eunsuh, Chaeyeon and Natty had also decided to leave JYPE.

In July 2017, Eunsuh, Natty and Jiwon competed on the Mnet reality girl group survival show Idol School. Jiwon finished in sixth place and debuted as a member of Fromis 9.

In mid-2018, Chaeyeon competed in Mnet's Produce 48, representing WM Entertainment. She finished in 12th place and debuted as a member of Iz*One in October 2018. In 2022, she debuted as soloist with the extended play Hush Rush.

Chaeryeong, the only JYP trainee remaining from Sixteen, debuted as a member of JYP Entertainment's new girl group, Itzy, in February 2019.

In April 2020, Natty signed with Swing Entertainment, and debuted as a soloist with her single "Nineteen" in May 2020. In 2022, Natty signed with S2 Entertainment. In July 2023, she debuted as a member of Kiss of Life.

Minyoung currently works at an international school and pursues music as a hobby. In February 2021, Minyoung resurfaced after six years by opening her YouTube channel, in which she plans to release vlogs, song covers, and self-composed music. On November 7, 2021, Minyoung released the single "Midnight" under the name "Myssong".
