= Do Not Touch =

2023 single by MiSaMo

Single by MiSaMo

from the EP Masterpiece
- Language: Japanese
- Released: July 14, 2023
- Studio: JYPE Studios (Seoul)
- Genre: R&B
- Length: 3:05
- Label: Warner Japan
- Composers: Hyuk Shin (153/Joombas); Ashley Alisha (153/Joombas); MRey (153/Joombas)
- Lyricists: Mayu Wakisaka; J. Y. Park "The Asiansoul"
- Producer: MRey (153/Joombas)

MiSaMo singles chronology
| "Marshmallow" (2023) | "Do Not Touch" (2023) | "New Look" (2024) |

Music video
- "Do Not Touch " on YouTube

"Do Not Touch" is a song recorded by MiSaMo. It was released as the lead single of their debut extended play Masterpiece. The song was pre-released for streaming and digital download on July 14, 2023.

== Release and promotion ==
On February 9, 2023, JYP Entertainment announced that the trio would debut as MiSaMo with an extended play on July 26. On June 14, they revealed the tracklist and "Do Not Touch" was confirmed as the lead single. The song was pre-released digitally on July 14 with an accompanying music video.

On July 21, MiSaMo performed "Do Not Touch" for the first time on TV Asahi's Music Station. On August 19, the group performed "Do Not Touch" on Venue101 Presents MiSaMo Masterpiece Show, a special live broadcast of NHK's music program Venue101. They also performed the song on NHK's New Year's Eve television special, Kōhaku Uta Gassen, on December 31.

== Composition ==
"Do Not Touch" is an R&B song that highlights the charm, color and maturity of the three members. Lyrically, it discusses the importance of consent in relationships, and contains the message that everyone is a noble being worthy of respect. Its lyrical concept is a play on the phrase "Do not touch" used as a warning against touching artwork in art galleries. The song is composed in the key of E♭ minor with a tempo of 150 beats per minute.

== Music video ==
The music video for "Do Not Touch", directed by Guzza, was released on July 14, 2023, the same day as the song's release. It opens with MiSaMo posing like statues in a "luxurious castle compound" and is interspersed with black-and-white dance scenes reminiscent of Beyoncé's "Single Ladies" music video. The sets and costumes used in the music video reference several classical paintings, including Botticelli's The Birth of Venus, Jean-Honoré Fragonard's The Swing, and Gustav Klimt's The Tree of Life, Stoclet Frieze. It ends with a shot of the members transforming into a framed painting in an art gallery; the painting is behind a rope barrier with a sign stating "Do not touch".

== Credits and personnel ==
- MiSaMo – vocals, rap, background vocals
- Elley – background vocals
- Mayu Wakisaka – vocal director, lyricist
- MRey – producer, programming, bass, drum, guitar, keyboard, synthesizer
- Gu Hye Jin – recording engineer
- Lee Sang Yeop – recording engineer
- Tony Maserati – mixing engineer
- David K. Younghyun – mixing engineer
- Kwon Nam Woo – mastering engineer

== Charts ==
Chart performance for "Do Not Touch"
| Chart (2023) | Peak position |
|---|---|
| Japan (Japan Hot 100) | 58 |
| Japan Combined Singles (Oricon) | 45 |
| New Zealand Hot Singles (RMNZ) | 17 |
| US World Digital Song Sales (Billboard) | 13 |

== Certifications ==
Certifications for "Do Not Touch"
| Region | Certification | Certified units/sales |
Streaming
| Japan (RIAJ) | Gold | 50,000,000^{†} |
^{†} Streaming-only figures based on certification alone.

== Release history ==
Release history for "Do Not Touch"
| Region | Date | Format | Label | Ref |
|---|---|---|---|---|
| Various | July 14, 2023 | Digital download; streaming | Warner Japan | |
