= Celebrate (Twice album) =

2022 studio album by Twice

Studio album by Twice
- Released: July 27, 2022
- Length: 30:14
- Languages: Japanese; English
- Label: Warner Music Japan

Twice chronology
#Twice4 (2022)	Celebrate (2022)	Between 1&2 (2022)

Singles from Celebrate
- 1. "Doughnut" Released: December 3, 2021; 2. "Celebrate" Released: July 15, 2022

Celebrate is the fourth Japanese studio album (seventh overall) by South Korean girl group Twice. Warner Music Japan released it on July 27, 2022.

The album features nine tracks, including the title track, "Celebrate", and the previously released single "Doughnut". It also includes "Just Be Yourself", which was previously released as a digital single on March 22, 2022, and was used in Twice's advertisements for Lux Japan hair care products.

== Release and promotion ==
In May 2022, Twice announced that they would release an album titled Celebrate on July 27 to commemorate their fifth debut anniversary in Japan. The title track, "Celebrate", was pre-released as a digital single on July 15, along with the accompanying music video.

To promote the album, Twice performed the eponymous title track on TV Asahi's Music Station on July 22. The next day, the group performed "That's All I'm Saying" and "Celebrate" during a special live broadcast of NHK's music program Venue 101. Songs from the album were also performed during Twice Japan Fan Meeting 2022 "Once Day", held in Tokyo and Osaka for five days in October.

On December 28, Celebrate was released as a limited edition vinyl record. This is Twice's first album to be released in that format.

== Commercial performance ==
Following its release, the album debuted atop the daily ranking of the Oricon Albums Chart. It then debuted at number two on the weekly chart with 114,537 copies sold.

== Track listing ==
Track listing for Celebrate
No.	Title	Lyrics	Music	Arrangement	Length
1.	"Celebrate"	J. Y. Park "The Asiansoul"; Twice; Co-sho	Woo Min Lee "collapsedone"; Justin Reinstein; MRCH; JJean	Lee; Reinstein	3:08
2.	"Voices of Delight"	STARBUCK; YHEL	Zaydro; STARBUCK; YHEL	Zaydro	3:03
3.	"Tick Tock"	Dahyun; Mayu Wakisaka	Trippy; Wakisaka	Trippy	3:03
4.	"Flow Like Waves"	Shoko Fujibayashi	Ejae; Anna Timgren; Aaron Kim	Kim	3:33
5.	"That's All I'm Saying"	Dahyun; Risa Horie	Trippy; Max Ulver; Nanna Bottos	Trippy	3:02
6.	"Bitter Sweet"	Co-sho	Lee; Ollipop; Hayley Aitken; STWP	Lee; STWP	3:30
7.	"Sandcastle"	Yu-ki Kokubo	Kyle Reynolds; Margaret Peake; IMKK	IMKK	3:12
8.	"Just Be Yourself"	FanFan	Lee; Reinstein; Timgren	Lee; Reinstein	3:20
9.	"Doughnut"	Lauren Kaori	Alexis Kesselman; Woo S. Rhee "Rainstone"; Francis; Fingazz	Rhee; Francis; Fingazz	4:23
Total length:					30:14

First press limited edition A DVD
No.	Title	Length
1.	"Doughnut" (Music Video)
2.	"Doughnut" (Music Video Other ver.)
3.	"Wonderful Day" (Member Selfie Movie)
4.	"Doughnut" (Music Video Making Movie)
5.	"Celebrate" (Jacket Shooting Making Movie)

== Personnel ==
Credits are adapted from the album's liner notes.

=== Musicians ===
- Twice – vocals, background vocals
- Woo Min Lee "collapsedone" – programming, guitar, synthesizer, vocal director (1, 6, 8); bass (1)
- Justin Reinstein – programming, synthesizer (1, 8)
- Kate – background vocals (1, 3, 5, 8–9)
- MRCH – background vocals (1), vocal director (1, 6)
- Zaydro – all instruments (2)
- Elley – background vocals (2, 4, 6–7)
- Emily Yeonseo Kim – vocal director (2, 7)
- Trippy – drums, bass, keyboard, synthesizer, vocal director (3, 5); strings (3), guitar (5)
- Aaron Kim – all instruments, vocal director (4)
- Isaac Han – vocal director (4)
- STWP – programming, guitar, synthesizer (6)
- IMKK – all instruments (7)
- Woo S. Rhee "Rainstone" – all instruments, vocal director (9)
- Francis – all instruments (9)
- Fingazz – all instruments (9)
- JuHyeon Jun – strings arrangement (9)
- Kobee – vocal director (9)

=== Technical ===
- Goo Hye-jin – recording (1–3, 5–8)
- Eom Se-hee – recording (1, 3, 5–6)
- Tony Maserati – mixing (1, 9)
- David K. Younghyun – mixing (1), mix engineering (9)
- Kwon Nam-woo – mastering (1–8)
- Hiroyuki Kishimoto – mixing (2)
- KayOne Lee – digital editing (3, 5, 7, 9)
- Yoon Won-kwon – mixing (3, 5)
- Park Eun-jung – recording (4)
- Dawson – digital editing (4)
- Ashe Ahn – digital editing (4)
- D'tour – digital editing (4)
- Lee Tae-sub – mixing (4, 7–8)
- Park Nam-jun – digital editing, mix engineering (6)
- Shin Bong-won – mixing (6)
- Woo S. Rhee "Rainstone" – music recording, digital editing (9)
- Francis – music recording, digital editing (9)
- Fingazz – music recording (9)
- Dante Kim – music recording assistance (9)
- Choi Hye-jin – recording (9)
- Chris Gehringer – mastering (9)

== Charts ==
=== Weekly charts ===
Weekly chart performance for Celebrate
Chart (2022)	Peak position
Japanese Albums (Oricon)	2
Japanese Combined Albums (Oricon)	2
Japanese Hot Albums (Billboard Japan)	2

=== Monthly charts ===
Monthly chart performance for Celebrate
Chart (2022)	Peak position
Japanese Albums (Oricon)	5

=== Year-end charts ===
Year-end chart performance for Celebrate
Chart (2022)	Position
Japanese Albums (Oricon)	34
Japanese Hot Albums (Billboard Japan)	35

== Certifications ==
Region	Certification	Certified units/sales
Japan (RIAJ)	Gold	100,000^{^}
^{^} Shipments figures based on certification alone.

== Release history ==
Release dates and formats for Celebrate
Region	Date	Format(s)	Edition	Label	Ref.
Various	July 27, 2022	Digital download; streaming	Normal Edition	Warner Music Japan	
Japan	July 27, 2022	CD	Normal Edition	Warner Music Japan	
Japan	July 27, 2022	CD + DVD	Limited Edition A	Warner Music Japan	
Japan	July 27, 2022	CD	Limited Edition B	Warner Music Japan	
Japan	December 28, 2022	Vinyl	Limited Edition	Warner Music Japan	
