= Liaison: Kodomo no Kokoro Shinryōjo =

Japanese manga series

- First tankōbon volume cover

リエゾン ーこどものこころ診療所ー (Riezon: Kodomo no Kokoro Shinryōjo)
- Genre: Medical drama
- Manga
- Written by: Yūsaku Takemura
- Illustrated by: Yonchan
- Published by: Kodansha
- Imprint: Morning KC
- Magazine: Morning
- Original run: March 5, 2020 – July 3, 2025
- Volumes: 21
- Television drama
- Directed by: Hajime Takezono; Yuki Saito; Takashi Komatsu
- Written by: Noriko Yoshida; Nishioka to Neil
- Music by: Masahiro Tokuda
- Studio: TV Asahi; MMJ
- Original network: TV Asahi
- Original run: January 20, 2023 – March 10, 2023
- Episodes: 8
- icon

Liaison: Kodomo no Kokoro Shinryōjo (Japanese: リエゾン ーこどものこころ診療所ー, Hepburn: Riezon: Kodomo no Kokoro Shinryōjo; lit. 'Liaison: Clinic for Children's Hearts') is a Japanese manga series written by Yūsaku Takemura and illustrated by Yonchan. It was serialized in Kodansha's seinen manga magazine Morning from March 2020 to July 2025. An eight-episode live-action television drama adaptation aired from January to March 2023.

== Summary ==
Shiho Tōno, a pediatric intern at a teaching hospital, is a regular tardy and forgetful person, and always makes at least one mistake a day. Her preceptor, Yamazaki, was often angry with her, and eventually told her to "give up being a pediatrician." After completing her pediatric training, the only clinic that took Shiho on was the Sayama Clinic, a child psychiatry in a rural area. Shiho meets Taku Sayama, the eccentric director of the clinic, and together they deal with children with various kinds of psychological distress.

== Media ==
=== Manga ===
Written by Yūsaku Takemura and illustrated by Yonchan, Liaison: Kodomo no Kokoro Shinryōjo was serialized in Kodansha's seinen manga magazine Morning from March 5, 2020, to July 3, 2025. Its chapters were collected into twenty-one tankōbon volumes released from June 23, 2020, to September 22, 2025.

No.	Release date	ISBN
1	June 23, 2020	978-4-06-519905-3
2	October 23, 2020	978-4-06-520749-9
3	December 23, 2020	978-4-06-521768-9
4	March 23, 2021	978-4-06-522608-7
5	June 23, 2021	978-4-06-523452-5
6	September 22, 2021	978-4-06-524546-0
7	December 23, 2021	978-4-06-526254-2
8	March 23, 2022	978-4-06-527012-7
9	June 22, 2022	978-4-06-528239-7
10	September 22, 2022	978-4-06-529052-1
11	January 23, 2023	978-4-06-530485-3
12	February 21, 2023	978-4-06-530661-1
13	May 23, 2023	978-4-06-531174-5
14	August 23, 2023	978-4-06-532646-6
15	November 22, 2023	978-4-06-533667-0
16	February 22, 2024	978-4-06-534583-2
17	May 22, 2024	978-4-06-535375-2
18	August 22, 2024	978-4-06-536633-2
19	November 21, 2024	978-4-06-537364-4
20	May 22, 2025	978-4-06-538637-8
21	September 22, 2025	978-4-06-540807-0

=== Drama ===
In November 2022, a live-action television drama adaptation was announced. The drama starred Ikusaburo Yamazaki and Honoka Matsumoto as Taku Sayama and Shiho Tono respectively, and aired eight episodes on TV Asahi from January 20 to March 10, 2023.

== Reception ==
The series was nominated for the 47th Kodansha Manga Award in the General category in 2023.

By September 2025, the series had over 2.5 million copies in circulation.
