= Like Ooh-Ahh =

2015 single by Twice

Single by Twice

from the EP The Story Begins
- Language: Korean
- Released: October 20, 2015
- Genre: K-pop; dance
- Length: 3:35
- Label: JYP
- Songwriters: Black Eyed Pilseung; Sam Lewis

Twice singles chronology
"Like Ooh-Ahh" (2015)	"Cheer Up" (2016)

Music video
- "Like Ooh-Ahh" on YouTube

"Like Ooh-Ahh" (Korean: Ooh-Ahh하게; RR: Ooh-Ahh hage; stylized as "Like OOH-AHH") is the debut single recorded by South Korean girl group Twice. It was released by JYP Entertainment on October 20, 2015, as the lead single from their debut extended play The Story Begins. It was written and composed by Black Eyed Pilseung and Sam Lewis.

== Composition ==
"Like Ooh-Ahh"
Chorus part of "Like Ooh-Ahh", a "color pop" dance song, which is mixed with various genres.

"Like Ooh-Ahh" is described as a "color pop" dance track with elements of hip-hop, rock, and R&B. The composition team included Black Eyed Pilseung and lyricist Sam Lewis, known for producing successful releases such as Miss A's "Only You".

== Music video ==
On October 20, 2015, the song's music video was released on JYP Entertainment's YouTube Channel. It was directed by Kim Young-jo and Yoo Seung-woo of production team Naive.

The video begins with Twice in a run-down hospital filled with zombies. However, the members barely notice them and continue dancing and singing through the halls, the roof, a bus, and leading to a space eventually with the zombies themselves. It ends as one of the zombies hears his own heartbeat and slowly turns back into a human. The song's dance was choreographed by Lia Kim of 1Million Dance Studio with JYP Entertainment choreographer Yun Hee-so.

On November 11, 2016, it hit 100 million views on YouTube, making Twice the fourth K-pop girl group to reach this milestone, as well as the first debut music video to do so. Twice became the first K-pop female act to have three music videos with 200 million views each, as "Like Ooh-Ahh" achieved this view count by November 2 the following year. In July 2024, it became the group's eighth music video to surpass 500 million views on YouTube.

== Commercial performance ==
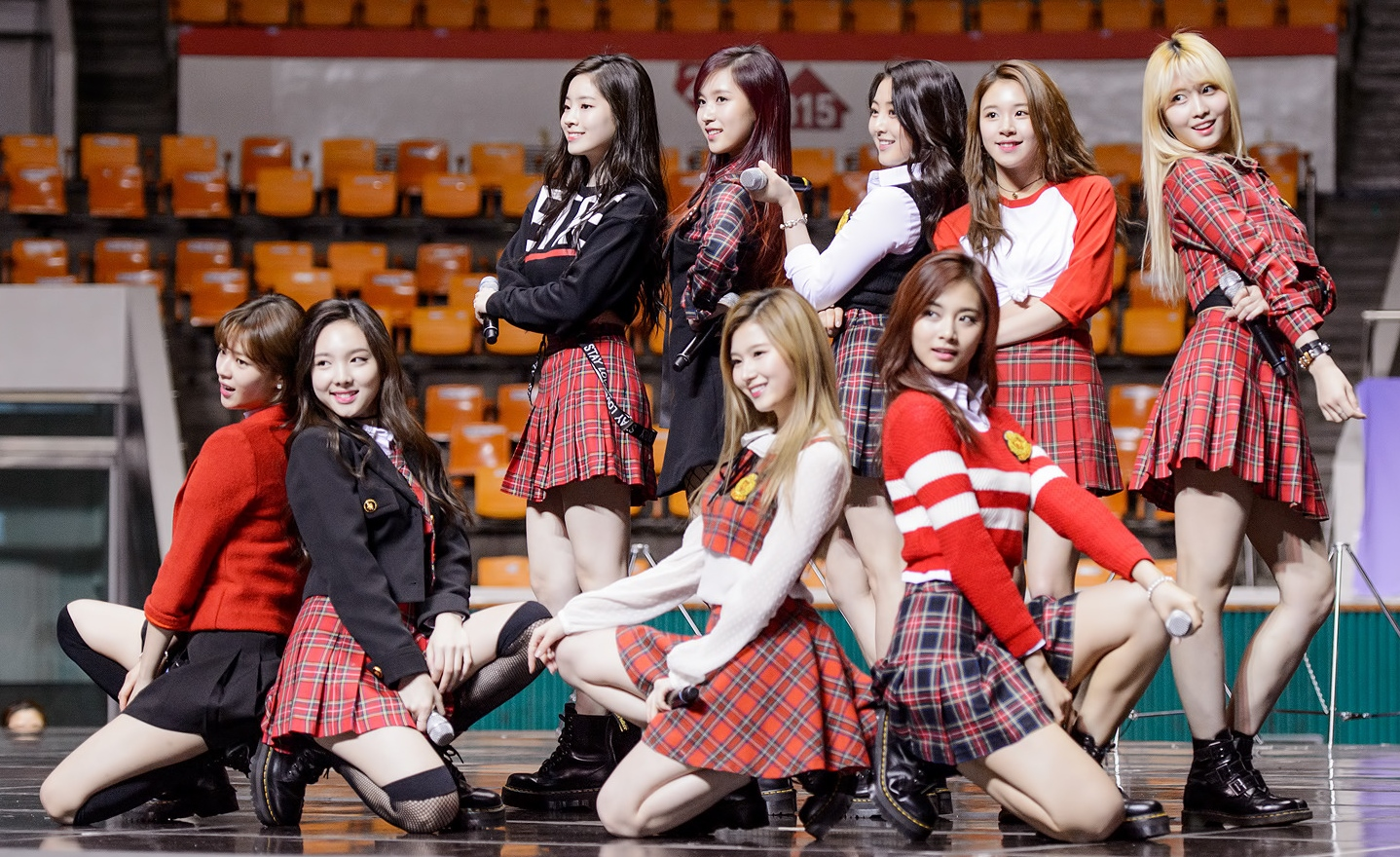
Twice performing "Like Ooh-Ahh" in February 2016

"Like Ooh-Ahh" debuted at number 22 on Gaon's Digital Chart. After positive word of mouth spread about the song and its stage performances, "Like Ooh-Ahh" gradually rose in the charts until it reached its peak position at number 10, three months after its release. According to the Korean media, this chart trajectory was unusual for a rookie girl group. The song also peaked at number 6, 27 and 49 on Billboard charts' World Digital Song Sales, Billboard Japan Hot 100, and Philippine Hot 100, respectively.

"Like Ooh-Ahh" surpassed 100 million streams in February 2017 and 2,500,000 downloads in July 2018 on Gaon Music Chart.

== Japanese version ==
On February 24, 2017, Twice officially announced that their debut in Japan was set for June 28. They released a compilation album titled #Twice which consists of ten songs including both Korean and Japanese-language versions of "Like Ooh-Ahh". The Japanese lyrics were written by Yhanael.

== Charts ==
=== Weekly charts ===
Weekly chart performance
Chart (2015–2017)	Peak position
Japan (Japan Hot 100)	27
Philippines (Philippine Hot 100)	49
Philippines (BillboardPH K-pop Top 5)	4
South Korea (Gaon)	10
US World Digital Song Sales (Billboard)	6

=== Year-end charts ===
2016 year-end chart performance for "Like Ooh-Ahh"
Chart (2016)	Position
South Korea (Gaon)	16

2017 year-end chart performance for "Like Ooh-Ahh"
Chart (2017)	Position
Japan (Japan Hot 100)	56

== Certifications and sales ==
Certifications and sales
Region	Certification	Certified units/sales
South Korea	—	2,500,000
Streaming
Japan (RIAJ)	Gold	50,000,000^{†}
South Korea	—	100,000,000
^{†} Streaming-only figures based on certification alone.
