= Runaway =

Runaway often refers to:

- Runaway (dependent), a minor who has left home without permission
- Fugitive, a person fleeing from custody

Runaway, Runaways or Run Away may also refer to:

== Engineering ==
- Runaway reaction, a chemical reaction releasing more heat than what can be removed and becoming uncontrollable
- Thermal runaway, self-increase of the reaction rate of an exothermic process while temperature increases with the heat released and giving rise to an explosion
- Chain reaction, chemical, or nuclear, reaction giving rise to an exponential propagation with catastrophic consequences
- Diesel engine runaway, the impossibility to turn off a diesel engine fueled by an excess of its own lubricating oil

== Arts and media ==
=== Films ===
- The Runaway (1917 film), an American film starring Julia Sanderson
- The Runaway (1926 film), an American film starring Warner Baxter
- Runaway (1958 film) (Bari Theke Paliye), a Bengali film by Ritwik Ghatak
- The Runaway (1961), an American film starring Cesar Romero
- The Runaway (1964), a British film by Tony Young
- Runaway (1964 film), a New Zealand film by John O'Shea
- Runaway! (1973 film), a TV film
- The Runaways (1975 film), an American made-for-television drama
- Runaway (1984 American film), a science fiction action film starring Tom Selleck and Gene Simmons
- Runaway (1984 North Korean film), a drama by Shin Sang-ok
- Run Away (1984 film), a Taiwanese film by Wang Toon
- Runaway, an American TV film starring Jasmine Guy
- Runaway (1995 film), a South Korean film
- The Runaway (2000), a TV film in the Hallmark Hall of Fame
- Runaway (2001 film), a Hong Kong film
- The Runaway (2004 film), a German short film
- Runaway (2005 film), a film starring Aaron Stanford and Robin Tunney
- Runaway (2009 film), an animated short by Cordell Barker
- Runaway (2010 film), a musical starring Kanye West
- The Runaways (2010 film), a film about the 1970s band The Runaways
- Runaway (2013 film) or Udhao, a Bangladeshi film by Amit Ashraf
- The Runaways (2018 film), a British film

=== Literature ===
==== Books ====
- The Runaway: A Story for the Young, an 1872 novel by Elizabeth Anna Hart
- "The Runaway" (short story), an 1887 short story by Anton Chekhov
- The Runaways: A New and Original Story, a 1903 novel by Nat Gould
- "The Runaway", a 1923 short poem by Robert Frost, collected in Selected Poems
- The Runaway, a 1939 novel by Kathleen Norris
- Runaway, a 1957 novel by John Creasey under the pseudonym Michael Halliday
- The Runaways, a 1959 novel by Patricia Lynch
- The Runaways, a 1962 novel by Patricia Robins
- The Runaways, the alternate title of Linnets and Valerians, a 1964 novel by Elizabeth Goudge
- The Runaways, a 1972 novel by Victor Canning, the first installment in the Smiler Trilogy
- The Runaway, a 1979 novel by Gillian Cross
- Runaway, a 1979 novel by Paul Kropp
- Runaways, a 1979 novel by John Rowe Townsend
- Runaway, a 1984 by Gloria D. Miklowitz
- Runaway, a 1985 novel by Francine Pascal, the 21st installment in the Sweet Valley High series
- Runaway, a 1985 novel by Clarissa Watson
- Runaway, a 1985 non-fiction book by Lucy Irvine
- The Runaways (novel), a 1987 novel by Ruth Thomas
- Runaway: Diary of a Street Kid, a 1989 memoir by Evelyn Lau
- Runaway: A Collection of Stories, a 1990 short story collection by Mary Clearman Blew
- Runaway, a 1990 novel by Emilie Richards
- Runaway, a 1990 novel by Kate Walker
- Runaway, a 1992 novel by Marilyn Kaye
- Runaways, a 1994 novel by Andrew J. Fenady
- Runaway, a 1994 novel by Heather Graham Pozzessere
- Runaway, a 1996 novel by Maureen Wartski
- The Runaways, a 1997 novel by Kristin Butcher
- The Runaway, a 1997 novel by Martina Cole
- The Runaway, a 1997 novel by Terry Kay
- Runaway, a 1997 novel by R. L. Stine, the 41st installment in the Fear Street series
- Runaways, a 1998 novel by V. C. Andrews, the fifth installment in the Orphans series
- The Runaway, a 1998 novel by Ben M. Baglio under the pseudonym Lucy Daniels, the third installment in the Jess the Border Collie series
- The Runaways, a 1999 novel by Zilpha Keatley Snyder
- Runaways, a 2001 novel in the Tom Clancy's Net Force Explorers series
- Runaway (book), a 2004 collection of short stories by Alice Munro
- Runaway, a 2006 novel by Wendelin Van Draanen
- "Runaway", 2008 and 2014 short stories by Derek Nikitas
- Runaway, a 2010 novel by Meg Cabot
- Runaway, a 2011 novella by Elizabeth Gunn
- The Runaway, a 2012 novel by Katie Flynn
- Runaway, a 2012 novel by Anne Laughlin
- Runaway, a 2014 novel by Marie-Louise Jensen
- Runaway, a 2014 novel by Kate O'Hearn, the second installment in the Valkyrie trilogy
- Runaway, a 2015 novel by Peter May
- The Runaways, a 2015 novel by Ruth Symes under the pseudonym Megan Rix
- "The Runaway", a 2015 short story by Lesley Thomson
- Runaway, a 2016 novella by Tui T. Sutherland, the fourth instalment in the Wings of Fire: Winglets series
- The Runaways, a 2018 novel by Fatima Bhutto
- Runaways, a 2018 novel by Christopher Golden, based on the eponymous Marvel comic book series
- The Runaways, a 2019 novel by Holly Webb
- Runaway, a 2021 novel by Brandon Q. Morris, the fourth installment in the Proxima Logfiles series

==== Comics ====
- Runaways (comics), a comic book series by Marvel Comics that began in 2003
- Runaway (Amalgam Comics), a fictional comic book character from 1996
- Runaway, a masked vigilante from the comic book series Batman: Gotham Knights – Gilded City

==== Plays ====
- The Runaway (play), a 1776 play by Hannah Cowley
- The Runaway, a 1911 Broadway play starring Billie Burke
- The Runaways: A Comedy in Three Acts, a 1928 play by Eden Phillpotts

=== Music ===
==== Groups ====
- The Runaways, a 1970s American all-female rock band
- The Runaways, a team of producers-songwriters led by Sam Watters
- Bill Kenwright and the Runaways, a 1960s UK band led by Bill Kenwright

==== Albums ====
- Runaway (Bill Champlin album), 1981
- Runaway (Solution album), 1982
- Runaway (Carola Häggkvist album), 1986
- Runaway (Jim Carroll album), 2000, or its title track
- Runaway (Passenger album), 2018
- Runaway, a 1984 album by Dakota
- Runaway, a 2006 album by Petia or its title song
- Run Away, a 1995 album by Robert Aaron
- The Runaways (album), a 1976 album by the band of the same name
- The Runaway (album), a 2010 album by the Magic Numbers

==== Songs ====
- "Runaway" (Del Shannon song), 1961
- "Runaway" (Jefferson Starship song), 1978
- "Runaway" (Status Quo song), 1979
- "Runaway" (Thompson Twins song), 1982
- "Runaway" (Bon Jovi song), 1984
- "Runaway" (Deee-Lite song), 1992
- "Runaway" (Janet Jackson song), 1995
- "Runaway" (The Corrs song), 1995
- "Runaway" (E'voke song), 1995
- "Runaway" (Nuyorican Soul song), 1996
- "Runaway" (Linkin Park song), 2000
- "Runaway" (Sahlene song), 2002
- "Runaway" (Groove Coverage song), 2004
- "Runaway" (Jamiroquai song), 2006
- "Runaway" (Tohoshinki song), 2008
- "Runaway" (Boomkat song), 2008
- "Runaway" (Love and Theft song), 2009
- "Runaway" (Kanye West song), 2010
- "Runaway" (Devlin song), 2010
- "Runaway" (Ed Sheeran song), 2014
- "Runaway" (Self song), 2014
- "Runaway" (Aurora song), 2015
- "Runaway" (Cici song), 2015
- "Runaway" (Lil Peep song), 2018
- "Runaway" (Sebastián Yatra, Daddy Yankee and Natti Natasha song), 2019
- "Runaway" (OneRepublic song), 2023
- "Run Away" (Real McCoy song), 1994
- "Run Away" (Salsoul Orchestra song), 2001
- "Run Away" (Live song), 2003
- "Run Away" (SunStroke Project and Olia Tira song), 2010
- "Run Away" (Tzuyu song), 2024
- "Run-Away" (Super Furry Animals song), 2007
- "Runaways" (Eclipse song), 2016
- "Runaways" (The Killers song), 2012
- "Runaway (U & I)", a 2014 song by Galantis
- "Runaway", a 1976 song by Wishbone Ash from New England
- "Runaway", a 1980 song by Eruption
- "Runaway", a 1981 song by Bill Conti from the soundtrack For Your Eyes Only
- "Runaway", a 1990 song by Damn Yankees from Damn Yankees
- "Runaway", a 1990 song by Riot from The Privilege of Power
- "Runaway", a 1996 song by Richard Wright from Broken China
- "Runaway", a 1998 song by Cher from Believe
- "Runaway", a 2000 song by Pat McGee Band from Shine
- "Runaway", a 2002 song by Red Hot Chili Peppers from By the Way
- "Runaway", a 2003 song by Thriving Ivory from Thriving Ivory
- "Runaway", a 2004 song by IiO
- "Runaway", a 2005 song by Cartel from Chroma
- "Runaway", a 2006 song by Pink from I'm Not Dead
- "Runaway", a 2007 song by Nelly Furtado, B-side of the single "Te Busqué"
- "Runaway", a 2007 song by Cascada from Perfect Day
- "Runaway", a 2007 song by Avril Lavigne from The Best Damn Thing
- "Runaway", a 2008 song by 3 Doors Down from 3 Doors Down
- "Runaway", a 2008 song by Dukes of Windsor from Minus
- "Runaway", a 2008 song by Jay Sean from My Own Way
- "Runaway", a 2008 song by Ladytron from Velocifero
- "Runaway", a 2008 song by Darin Zanyar from Flashback
- "Runaway", a 2009 song by Yeah Yeah Yeahs from It's Blitz!
- "Runaway", a 2010 song by Maroon 5 from Hands All Over
- "Runaway", a 2010 song by Hail the Villain
- "Runaway", a 2010 song by the National from High Violet
- "Runaway", a 2010 song by the Afters from Light Up the Sky
- "Runaway", a 2011 song by Converge from Converge / Dropdead
- "Runaway", a 2011 song by the Kooks from Junk of the Heart
- "Runaway", a 2011 song by Mat Kearney from the soundtrack to Soul Surfer
- "Runaway", a 2012 song by Mumzy Stranger
- "Runaway", a 2012 song by the Vaccines from Come of Age
- "Runaway", a 2012 song by Olly Murs from Right Place Right Time
- "Runaway", a 2013 song by J. Cole from Born Sinner
- "Runaway", a 2013 song by Shinee from Dream Girl – The Misconceptions of You
- "Runaway", a 2013 song by Kara from Full Bloom
- "Runaway", a 2013 song by G-Dragon from Coup d'Etat
- "Runaway", a 2014 song by Parachute Youth
- "Runaway", a 2015 song by The Plot in You from Happiness in Self Destruction
- "Runaway", a 2015 song by Coldrain from Vena
- "Runaway", a 2016 song by Ziggy Alberts from Four Feet in the Forest
- "Runaway", a 2016 song by Against the Current from In Our Bones
- "Runaway", a 2017 song by Bobby from Love and Fall
- "Runaway", a 2017 song by Sasha Alex Sloan from Sad Girl
- "Runaway", a 2017 song by Pentagon from Demo_02
- "Runaway", a 2019 song by Eric Nam
- "Runaway", a 2020 song by Nao Kawamura featuring Wouter Hamel
- "Runaway", a 2020 song by Kang Daniel featuring Yumdda from Magenta
- "Runaway", a 2022 song by 100 gecs from Snake Eyes
- "Runaway", a 2022 song by Tokio Hotel from 2001
- "Runaway", a 2023 song by Pink from Trustfall
- "Runaway", a 2025 bonus track by The Weeknd from Hurry Up Tomorrow
- "Runaway", a 2025 song by Rescene
- "Runaway (Smalltown Boy)", a 2015 song by Kate Ryan
- "Run Away", a 1982 song by 10cc from Ten Out of 10
- "Run Away", a 1986 song by Great White from Shot in the Dark
- "Run Away", a 2005 song by Staind from Chapter V
- "Run Away", a 2006 song by Bubba Sparxxx from The Charm
- "Run Away", a 2009 song by Stream in Passion from The Flame Within
- "Run Away", a 2010 song by Weezer from Hurley
- "Run Away", a 2011 song by Sarah Jarosz from Follow Me Down
- "Run Away", a 2015 song by Snoop Dogg from Bush
- "Run Away", a 2017 song by Chris Brown from Heartbreak on a Full Moon
- "Run Away", a 2017 song by Dvsn from Morning After
- "Run Away", a 2019 song by Teen Top
- "Run Away", a 2018 song by The Word Alive from Violent Noise
- "Run Away", a 2019 song by In2It
- "Run Away", a 2019 song by Got7 from Call My Name
- "Run Away", a 2024 song by Tzuyu from Aboutzu
- "Run Away!", a 2005 song by Eric Idle from the musical Spamalot
- "Run-A-Way", a 1996 song by the Soundlovers, also covered by Yasmin K.
- "Run Away (The Escape Song)", a 1990 song by Oingo Boingo from Dark at the End of the Tunnel
- "Runaways", a 1982 song by XTC from English Settlement
- "Runaways", a 1988 song by Pseudo Echo from Race
- "Runaways", a 1992 song by Ringo Starr from Time Takes Time
- "Runaways", a 2008 song by Brother Firetribe from Heart Full of Fire
- "Runaways", a 2015 song by All Time Low from Future Hearts
- "Runaways", a 2016 song by Sam Feldt and Deepend featuring Teemu
- "Runaways", a 2016 song by Carly Rae Jepsen from the film Ballerina
- "The Runaway", a 1973 song by Gentle Giant from In a Glass House
- "The Runaway", a 1979 song by Elkie Brooks from Live and Learn
- "The Runaway", a 2014 song by The Word Alive from Real
- "The Runaways", a 2005 song by Anberlin from Never Take Friendship Personal
- "Runnaway", a 2009 song by the Plastiscines from About Love

==== Musicals ====
- Runaways (musical), a 1978 Broadway musical by Elizabeth Swados
- The Runaways (musical), a 1903 Broadway production

=== Television ===
==== Series and specials ====
- Runaway (2006 TV series), an American drama television series about a family fleeing from a murderer and the authorities
- Runaway (TV serial), a 2009 British drama television miniseries about a boy who runs away from home
- Runaways (TV series) or Marvel's Runaways, a 2017-2019 TV series set in the Marvel Cinematic Universe about youths running away from their parents, who run an organized crime ring
- The Runaway (TV series), a 2011 British television drama series based on the novel by Martina Cole
- The Runaways (TV series), a 1978–1979 American series about a psychologist trying to help troubled teens, produced by Quinn Martin
- Run Away (TV series), a 2026 British television miniseries

==== Episodes ====
- "Runaway", Arc the Lad episode 8 (1999)
- "Runaway", Blossom season 3, episode 3 (1992)
- "Runaway", Bob Hope Presents the Chrysler Theatre season 1, episode 12 (1964)
- "Runaway", Cedar Cove season 3, episode 7 (2015)
- "Runaway", Dallas (1978) season 2, episode 7 (1978)
- "Runaway" (Dexter: New Blood), episode 5 (2021)
- "Runaway", Heartland season 15, episode 2 (2021)
- "Runaway", Holby City series 3, episode 12 (2001)
- "Runaway", Judd, for the Defense season 2, episode 23 (1969)
- "Runaway", Kevin Spencer season 2, episode 15 (2000)
- "Runaway", Law & Order: Special Victims Unit season 2, episode 16 (2001)
- "Runaway", Medical Center season 1, episode 16 (1970)
- "Runaway", NASCAR Racers season 2, episode 10 (2001)
- "Runaway", Pacific Blue season 2, episode 17 (1997)
- "Runaway", Pacific Palisades episode 6 (1997)
- "Runaway", Pen15 season 2 part 2, episode 14 (2021)
- "Runaway" (Quantum Leap) (1991)
- "Runaway", Space Cases season 2, episode 11 (1997)
- "Runaway", Star Trek: Short Treks season 1, episode 1 (2018)
- "Runaway", Terrahawks series 3, episode 8 (1986)
- "Runaway", The Adventures of Black Beauty series 1, episode 5 (1972)
- "Runaway", The Bill series 8, episode 43 (1992)
- "Runaway", The Brak Show season 2, episode 7 (2002)
- "Runaway", The Facts of Life season 3, episode 18 (1982)
- "Runaway", The Fitzpatricks episode 11 (1977)
- "Runaway", The Littlest Hobo season 2, episode 15 (1981)
- "Runaway", The Streets of San Francisco season 4, episode 23 (1976)
- "Runaway", The Stu Erwin Show season 2, episode 23 (1952)
- "Runaway", Transformers: Armada episode 30 (2003)
- "Runaway", Vegas (1978) season 2, episode 4 (1979)
- "Runaway", Warehouse 13 season 4 part 2, episode 16 (2013)
- "Runaway", Webster season 2, episode 14 (1985)
- "Runaway", Where the Heart Is series 3, episode 12 (1999)
- "Runaways", Gargoyles season 3, episode 3 (1996)
- "Runaways" (House), season 8, episode 10 (2012)
- "Runaways", Lassie (1954) season 1, episode 17 (1955)
- "Runaways", The Golden Palace episode 14 (1993)
- "Runaways", The Strain season 1, episode 5 (2014)
- "Runaways", ThunderCats (1985) season 2, episode 23 (1987)
- "Runaways", Where the Heart Is series 5, episode 2 (2001)
- "Runaways", Young Justice season 2, episode 14 (2013)
- "The Runaway", Angry Birds Stella season 1, episode 5 (2014)
- "The Runaway", Avatar: The Last Airbender season 3, episode 7 (2007)
- "The Runaway", Davey and Goliath season 2, episode 8 (1962)
- "The Runaway", Detective School season 2, episode 4 (1979)
- "The Runaway", Fury season 2, episode 1 (1956)
- "The Runaway", Glitter episode 13 (1985)
- "The Runaway", Judge Roy Bean episode 6 (1955)
- "The Runaway", Kimba the White Lion episode 18 (1966)
- "The Runaway", Laramie season 3, episode 17 (1962)
- "The Runaway", Lassie (1954 TV series) season 4, episode 1 (1957)
- "The Runaway", Lawman season 1, episode 18 (1959)
- "The Runaway", Malory Towers series 2, episode 6 (2021)
- "The Runaway", Men of the World series 1, episode 6 (1994)
- "The Runaway", Richard Diamond, Private Detective season 3, episode 23 (1959)
- "The Runaway", Run, Joe, Run season 2, episode 10 (1975)
- "The Runaway", Shameless (British) series 4, episode 4 (2007)
- "The Runaway", Skippy the Bush Kangaroo season 1, episode 26 (1968)
- "The Runaway", Solo One episode 1 (1976)
- "The Runaway", Studio One season 6, episode 16 (1954)
- "The Runaway", Terra Nova episode 5 (2011)
- "The Runaway", The Adventures of Gulliver episode 13 (1968)
- "The Runaway", The Dukes of Hazzard season 2, episode 14 (1980)
- "The Runaway", The Flying House season 1, episode 10 (1982)
- "The Runaway", The Life and Times of Grizzly Adams season 2, episode 16 (1978)
- "The Runaway", The New Adventures of the Lone Ranger season 1, episode 16 (1981)
- "The Runaway", The Virginian season 8, episode 6 (1969)
- "The Runaway", The Waltons season 3, episode 5 (1974)
- "The Runaway", Thomas & Friends season 2, episode 10 (1986)
- "The Runaway" (Wednesday Theatre), a 1966 Australian TV play
- "The Runaway", What's Happening!! season 1, episode 1 (1976)
- "The Runaway", Whirlybirds season 2, episode 4 (1958)
- "The Runaways", Annie Oakley season 2, episode 3 (1954)
- "The Runaways", Baretta season 3, episode 18 (1977)
- "The Runaways" Baywatch season 5, episode 21 (1995)
- "The Runaways", Bus Stop episode 13 (1961)
- "The Runaways", Catch Kandy episode 1 (1973)
- "The Runaways", Cops season 27, episode 3 (2014)
- "The Runaways", Daktari season 4, episode 8 (1968)
- "The Runaways", Heartbeat series 18, episode 14 (2009)
- "The Runaways", High Tide season 1, episode 14 (1995)
- "The Runaways", Jake and the Kid (1995) season 2, episode 8 (1997)
- "The Runaways", Mad Men season 7, episode 5 (2014)
- "The Runaways", Man of the World series 1, episode 4 (1962)
- "The Runaways", My Friend Flicka episode 21 (1956)
- "The Runaways", One Day at a Time (1975) season 2, episodes 1–4 (1976)
- "The Runaways", The Adventures of Ozzie and Harriet season 7, episode 13 (1958)
- "The Runaways", The All-New Super Friends Hour episode 14b (1977)
- "The Runaways", The Bill Cosby Show season 2, episode 7 (1970)
- "The Runaways", The Brothers (1956 TV series) episode 24
- "The Runaways", The F.B.I. season 4, episode 4 (1968)
- "The Runaways!", The Raccoons season 1, episode 5 (1985)
- "The Runaways", The Streets of San Francisco season 2, episode 12 (1973)
- "The Runaways", The War at Home season 1, episode 21 (2006)
- "The Runaways", To Rome with Love season 2, episode 12 (1970)
- "The Runaways", Zorro (1957) season 2, episode 14 (1959)

=== Other arts ===
- The Runaway (ballet), a 2018 ballet by Kyle Abraham
- Runaway: A Road Adventure, a 2001 graphical adventure computer game
- The Runaway (painting), a painting by Norman Rockwell

== Places ==
- Runaway Beach, near Saint John's in Antigua and Barbuda
- Runaway Hills, Victoria Land, Antarctica
- Runaway Island, Graham Land, Antarctica
- Runaway Pond, Glover, Vermont, formerly a lake, now a marsh

== Other uses ==
- Runaway (dependent), a minor who has left home without permission
- RunAway, a South Korean esports team competing in Overwatch Contenders
- Fugitive, a person fleeing from custody
- Runaway, a bolting horse
- Runaway, a sloop designed and sailed by Bruce Kirby
- "Runaways" (beguny), a minor denomination within Old Believers

== See also ==
- "Run Away with Me", a 2015 song by Carly Rae Jepsen
- Runaway Train (disambiguation)
- Runaway star, a star with a high velocity
- Runaway truck ramp
- "Running Away", a 2002 single by Hoobastank
- Runway (disambiguation)
