= Denma =

2010–2019 webtoon by Yang Yeong-soon

Denma (a.k.a. DENMA THE QUANX)

덴마 RR: Denma MR: Tenma
- Genre: SF (Space opera / Cyberpunk), Action, Comedy, Supernatural, Omnibus (Chapter 1) → Ensemble cast (Chapter 2 ~)
- Author: Yang Yeong-soon
- Illustrator: Yang Yeong-soon
- Publisher: Neo-Cartoon
- English publisher: WEBTOON
- Magazine: Naver WEBTOON
- Original run: 8 January 2010 – 29 December 2019
- Collected volumes: 20 (19 + Denma S.E. Rami Record

Denma (Korean: 덴마) is a South Korean webtoon written and illustrated by Yang Yeong-soon and colored by Hong Seung-hee. Started on 8 January 2010, this manhwa was released on Naver WEBTOON, where it continues to be published. It has been translated into Japanese, English and Simplified and Traditional Chinese. The new English version is updated Wednesday, Thursday, Friday, Saturday and Sunday.

== Overview ==
In an interview, author Yang Yeong-soon stated he was reading the Bible at the time of writing and thus took inspiration for Denma, resulting in its many featured biblical names and themes.

The world view of Denma is the same as the author's previous works, Iron Dog John Doe (1998) and Rami Record (2008). According to the interview, 《Iron Dog John Doe》 was serialized in the manuscript "Young Red", "Comic King" published in Mr. Blue. It's a SF with a theme of violence. The title meaning that the 'dog made of iron has no trace'. The first idea was a school violence, but in 1997 of South Korea, this a time when the violence situation in the school is being discussed. So, if the author deal with the school violence, he thinks that it would change the sanction to SF. It's a story about the background setting of the virtual state of the "Cadet General Country" in the ambiguous era setting "Gwangmu 25th year". Its time background is roughly between Denma Chapter 2 A Catnap and Chapter 1 Sixteen. It's a world view of the neighborhood (administrative district) of country Enoch of planet Gaia of the universe eight. It's a somewhat absurd story that the conscription chiefs are fighting and fighting with the fighter. The Ssaurabi arms are all converted to cyborgs. It's a story where many weird weapons come out and frantic fight so it's a work aiming pure violence. The protagonist is Abigail, who's fighter (iron dog), and Eugene (young) appears.

The panels arranged vertically. In the Korean, Japanese and Chinese versions, it is usually read horizontally. In the old English version, it was also read horizontally, but later in the new English version, it was changed to the infinite canvas.

The fan of this work is called Denma's Police Guards and its motif to White Police Guards. The fans call some episodes where the work has binge watched and relaxing space is 'rest area'.

From 2019 May, the webtoon rating system is implemented. This work's rating is 15, which is the webtoon intended for readers 15 and over.

=== Setting ===
Quanx refers to superhumans with abilities that can't be explained by the laws of physics or by animals, include humans unaware of the conditions governing these abilities. There are Quanx that have various capabilities across the various universes. Although Quanx abilities defy easy categorization, it is not uncommon for various groups to attempt to kidnap and study Quanx, because once they are able to develop Quanx abilities as a practical product, it makes a huge amount of money. In addition to regular Quanx capabilities, it is also possible to develop Hyper-Level Quanx abilities. Even regular Quanx's injuries are abnormally fast-healing, and they are immune to diseases. Usually Quanxs are born naturally, but under certain conditions, two Quanxs may be "mated" and both a, Quanx and Transcriptome is made. The Hyper-Quanx also exist, and they're with 2 or more powers.

Object Quanx is among the Quanx. Kuan's Fridge and rooms of Silverquick are exist. In general, big object Quanxs can't make Transcriptomes, and it's because the system gets overloaded to make up for the overwhelming error, actually, there were a bunch who got overly curious, and made a simulation about this, they hypothesized they can make a Transcriptome out of this sort of object Quanx. Surprisingly, if the physical error exceeds a certain point, there can be a massive explosion when the object Quanx and its Transcriptome combine, massive enough to blow up an entire planet. The object Quanx Transcriptome is one of the most fiercely competed secret project done by the universe eight munitions industry, and powerful enough to blow up the entire planet, the people think they'll earn the supremacy of the universe eight if they succeed, and those arms manufacturers have placed object Quanxs in every planet as if they're competing, and these so-called Hell Gates represent their confidence and will that they'll win in the competition, and Sten Industry is ahead of everyone else in this field, the one that the El family holds the largest share of.

Transcriptome (전사체; 轉寫體; Jeonsache) is Quanx's interactant, like the Transcriptome. They're ivory, and looks white with the Georg filter. Given the nature of these, they're more likely to be used for control than protection. No physical attack works against them, but Gaal defeats Adams with the booster gun that Mirai gave him. They have an ego and they're able to eat and drink. The control Transcriptomes users are able to use them as an avatar, such as Camael. Usually, Quanxs are born naturally, but under some conditions (involving multiverse overlap), "mating" experiments are possible resulting in the production of both Quanx and Transcriptome. Adam, Camael and things in Church of Madonna (Internal Affairs, Prison Abronah) have been produced in this way.

Mating (메이팅; Meiting) is another phase of Dummy experiments after the biodummy course. "Dummies" are created by the implantation of a consciousness into a body, whereas "mating" involves combining one consciousness with another. Even planets that allow artificial neuronal cell procedures, strictly forbid "mating" with absolute regulation - because the outcome is unexpected, which is a secret kept by the U.C.S., unknown to the outside world. It's the connection between the sockets that is just forbidden, so the people can make Quanx and Transcriptome to one out of 100 samples. When this occurs, a conflict arises between the two consciousnesses, in which they compete with each other, and as a result of the contradiction, a subconscious infiltration occurs on one side of the other. Finally, a resolution appears between the two consciousnesses, and they find stability in mutual denial by each shifting to different dimensions, without affecting the same space and position. In order to compensate for the physical abnormality so incurred, the Transcriptome of the Quanx appears.

This work has many planets where the name is not revealed correctly. The planets to have a name are Urano, Terra, Thesis, Carlburn, Recca, Kadesh, Barnea, Silverquick's station 7, Negev, Winnova, Even, Goble, Bayeux, Toshka, Jato, Mayork, Tulou, Bella, Gaia, Gout, Aorica, Yana, Moab.

The world of this work, humans and many other alien races such as Ephraimites, Negevians, Devarims, etc. live. It's called the universe eight (8우주; 八宇宙; Pal Uju), in which there is the United Council of Space (U.C.S.). The nobles (귀족; 貴族; Gwijok) are rulers of various districts within each planet, and there're Dukes, Counts or Earls, and Barons, Marquesses (but Viscounts are not yet confirmed in the English version). Each layer of nobility maintain guards. The guards of the Gosan family are called White Police Guards. (In fact, "White Police Guards" isn't a direct translation... Gyeong (경; 警) means guard (경호; 警護; Gyeongho), so "police" is not the direct meaning. "White Centum Guards "or "Whitered" is a more direct meaning.) There is also gangland. The Emperor is the master of the black market. 20 years ago, maybe the king of Aorica was the master of the black market. The many religions such as Church of Madonna (태모신교; 胎母神敎; Taemosingyo), Goel, an Orthodox Church, and Nut exist. Also T.A.Q. (Troops Associated with Quanxs), a.k.a. Carlburn's Quanx Legion or Unit or Squad is exist. There's a relationship diagram created roughly by a web magazine.

=== Plot ===
Denma is a space opera centered around the intergalactic courier delivery service Silverquick.

Silverquick is an intergalactic courier service that hires "Quanx" with special abilities as delivery men. Dike, or "the Merciless Death of Planet Urano" contracts to Silverquick, subsequently and becomes trapped inside a body of a small child named Denma. He takes off on a journey of making interstellar deliveries and reclaiming his body in hope.

In Chapter 1, there're individual episodes to watch and intervene in various people's stories, and the stories of individual characters who're tied up by Silverquick, the vicious company. Furthermore, in Chapter 2, the story continued to expand with the Church of Madonna, which is the religion behind the Silverquick, and various multi-cosmic concepts that are the root of this church, and the veiled enmity between the nobles. And in South Korea, the Chapter 3 is going on.

== Episodes ==
- In this work, Season is used as Chapter. And the chapter of one Episode is used as Part. Here, chapters can be confused with Chapter, so use chs. The number in brackets, in bold, is total number of chs. (chapters)
- A.E. means Additional Edition. It's a prologue or, an epilogue or, a combination of prologue and epilogue. Put these in the total number of chs. (chapters)
Chapter 1

No.	Title	Original release date	English release date
1	A Dog of Pamana; Pamanaui Gae (파마나의 개)	8 – 15 January 2010	(Old version) 13 October 2013 (New version) 7 January 2017
(1) - #1 ~ (4) - #4 **(4)**
The main character is the villain 'Dike' who's trapped in the body of the boy 'Denma' and performs the mission of the space deliverer. Dike was drunk with a woman who resembles his missing lover and contracted a space courier service.
2	Captain Hardok; Haejeokseonjang Hadok (해적선장 하독)	17 – 31 January 2010	(Old version) 2013 (New version) 7 January 2017
(1) - #5 ~ (6) - #10; 2. A.E. link - #11 **(7)**
Hitcher Greg (Hardok) was throws his livelihood to save his family and became space pirate. The story begins from boy Denma, but the vast scale of the universe and the story that fills it are with those who have lived in the universe, such as a dog of Pamana, and Captain Hardok.
3	EVE; Ibeu (이브(EVE))	1 February 2010	(Old version) 2013 (New version) 8 January 2017
link - #12 **(1)**
4	Eve Rachel; Ibeu Rahel (이브 라헬)	5 – 8 February 2010	(Old version) 2013 (New version) 11 – 13 January 2017
(1) - #13 ~ (3) - #15 **(3)**
5	Blackout; Beulraekaut (블랙아웃)	12 – 28 February 2010	(Old version) 2013 (New version) 14 – 25 January 2017
(1) - #16 ~ (6) - #21; 5. A.E. (1) - #22 ~ (2) - #23 **(8)**
Denma is looking for ways to escape by creating an organization called 'Apple' with those who're in a similar fate.
6	Band of Brothers	1 March 2010	(Old version) 2013 (New version) 26 January 2017
link - #24 **(1)**
7	Yael Road; Yael Rodeu (야엘 로드)	5 – 28 March 2010	(New version) 27 January ~ 10 February 2017
(1) - #25 ~ (9) - #33; 7. A.E. (1) - #22 ~ (2) - #23 **(11)**
Yael withstands any humiliation, for his beliefs.
8	Supervisor Bahel's How To Kill; Banjang baherui hau tu kil (반장 바헬의 하우 투 킬)	29 March 2010	(New version) 11 February 2017
link - #36 **(1)**
9	Mandragora; Mandeuragora (만드라고라)	2 – 23 April 2010	(Old version) 23 October ~ 23 November 2014 (New version) 12 – 25 February 2017
(First) 9. A.E. link - #36 / (1) - #38 ~ (7) - #45; (Last) 9. A.E. link - #46 **(9)**
	Note: Beer-Lahai-Ros Imitatros (, A mimicry-species); Tips: Motaejong Beuellahaeroi imiteiteuroseu (Tips : 모태종, 브엘라해로이 이미테이트로스)	11 April 2010	(New version) 18 February 2017
link - #41 **(1)**
10	For Supervisor Edrei; Banjang Edeureireul Wihan (반장 에드레이를 위한)	25 April 2010	(Old version) 27 November 2014 (New version) 26 February 2017
link - #47 **(1)**
11	Savoy Gaal; Saboi Gaal (사보이 가알)	26 April ~ 26 July 2010	(Old version) 30 November 2014 – 16 April 2015 (New version) 1 March ~ 23 April 2017
(First) 11. A.E. (Additional Edition) link - #48 / (1) - #49 ~ (38) - #86; (Last) 11. A.E. link - #87 **(40)**
Denma is able to hardly see the sign of escape. Gaal protects his sister by death.
12	Sixteen; Sikseutin (식스틴)	30 July ~ 31 December 2010	(Old version) 19 April, ~ 5 November 2015 (interrupted) (New version) 26 April ~ 27 July 2017
(1) - #88 ~ (57) - #144; 12. A.E. (1) - #145 ~ (10) - #154 **(67)**
This is the first flashback story. This is depicted Edel's past history as a popular character in 'Savoy Gaal', was a youthful love story that could be an excellent medium-length story or full-length story, and a variety foreshadow of Church of Madonna, have greatly expanded the scope of the story.
13	Marionette; Marioneteu (마리오네트)	2 – 7 January 2011	28 – 30 July 2017
(1) - #155 ~ (3) - #157 **(3)**
Dwight throws his life so keeps his wife's dead body.
14	Pigear; Pigieo (피기어)	9 January ~ 4 April 2011	2 August ~ 22 September 2017
(1) - #158 ~ (33) - #190; 14. A.E. (1) - #191 ~ (5) - #195 **(38)**
This is a story about a dirty, smelly, ugly, cowardly and fragile male Pigear, and a beautiful female Pigear which is said to have been made to boast in the universe. This story contains a full of harmful acts of a Pigear hunter, a hobbyist, a Quanx deliverer and an animal conservationist.
15	God's Lover; God's lover	8 April 2011 – 16 January 2012	23 September 2017 – 14 March 2018
(1) - #196 ~ (117) - #312; 15. A.E. (1) - #313 ~ (3-4; 6) - #318 **(123)**
This is the second flashback story. This is depict a violent and a ruthless and selfish tyrant Dr. God (Goad)'s odd love, and he's caught in a ruthless plot of the interplanetary scale. As the name implies, Dr. God's fundamental loneliness and love to infinity are embarrassed but a little touching. The dead God (Goad) losing his body and living in a network. Dr. God, who has become a god-like being by dominating all networks. The nerdy solitude still remains, but the infinite love is once again endlessly naive but a little bitterly end.
16	A.E.	20 – 27 January 2012	15 – 18 March 2018
(1-1) - #319 ~ (1-4) - #322 **(4)**
This story cause a lot of questions and makes the heart beats again. It shows a questionable red package and ends with Chapter 1, and predicts a huge story in Chapter 2.

Chapter 2

No.	Title	Original release date	English release date
1	A Catnap a catnap	29 January 2012 – 1 April 2013	21 March ~ 2 December 2018
(2-1) - (1) - #323 ~ (2-171) - (171) - #493; 1. A.E. (2-172) - (1) - #494 ~ (2-185) - (14) - #507 **(185)**
This is the third flashback story. This is deals with the nativity story (?) of Yahwah, the ruler of Silverquick, and a lot of foreshadows have been explained, but more indicated foreshadows are beforehand. Gosan family and White Police Guards reveal its appearance. Especially, the author draws the characters of his previous work, such as pre-priestess Rami (Rami Record) and guardian priest Abigail (Iron Dog John Doe) and weaves the story. Because it's a story of the old past, Denma doesn't appear until the story return to the present time. However at A.E., when the story is back in the past again, the boy Dike appears for a while.
S.E.(Special Edition)	Rami Record (expected); Rami Rekodeu (라미레코드)	Yahoo! Cartoon World: 8 August ~ 14 October 2008; Naver webtoon - Denma: 2 – 4 April 2013	None
Yahoo! Cartoon World: (1) ~ (19); Naver webtoon - Denma: (2-186) - (1) - #508 (in Korean) ~ (2-189) - (4) - #511 **(4)**
Joshua's soul, who was murdered by cognation and scattered in the Intersecting Space of parallel universes. Starting from here, the religion of love and retribution 'Church of Madonna'. The priestesses are given a role to look for the body of Saint Joshua along with the guardian priests. It's a duty that must be accomplished if Deva, the top priestess of the church body, is her future hope. The holy visit (심방; 尋訪; Simbang) is a trip to parallel universes according to the instructions of church body to find the body of Saint Joshua. This is the fourth flashback story, if it included in Denma.
2	Kuan's Fridge; Kwanui Naengjanggo (콴의 냉장고)	(Before interrupts) 5 April 2013 – 29 July 2014 (After interrupts) 6 July 2015 – 4 January 2016	5 December 2018 – 2 January 2020
(First) 2. A.E. (2-186) - (1) - #508 ~ (2-209) - (24) - #531 / (2-210) - (1) - #532 ~ (2-450) - (241) - #774; (Last) 2. A.E. (2-451) - (2-1) - #773 ~ (2-468) - (18) - #792 **(259)**
This story makes an object Quanx, Kuan's Fridge with a multidimensional space inside becomes the main variable. Inside this, a result (?) of the planet Aorica incident ('A Catnap' story, the result is drugs called "Hourglasses" (모래시계; Moraesigye)) that gave a great shock to the entire universe was hidden. The collision of the universe eight's 1st noble family, Gosan family and the 2nd noble family, El family, which are caused by this, let the readers get excited. The Duke Gosan and the Count El are entering the preparations for war in the supremacy of the universe eight. El's butler, Hazz draws the old White Police Guards that were forsaken by Gosan. And Cain who's El's son, holds hands with the Church of Madonna. However, the situation flows in a strange direction, because Gosan is shot by his cousin who opposes the war of the two families, so he falls down. In the meantime, Denma wanders through Kuan's Fridge, discovering the secret that Silverquick has hidden. And the Devarims prophesy the emergence of a new Dark Lord after the war. Having been disgraced by Cain, Hazz leaves El family, but returns to the word of El who has come to find him and directs the war. Cain and old White Police Guards, who have kidnapped Gosan who's falls into a coma, are wiped out in Kuan's Fridge, and Hazz begin to counterattack with Red Wolves, who have long been training for the war against the Gosan family. On the other hand, Hades from another universe with his army raids the Church of Madonna and the Gosan family, and in the planet Nekar, Marquess Hojo conspires to increase Gosan's an evil reputation. And in this confusion, Denma shares Apple's secrets with Silverquick.
3	The knight The knight	7 January 2016 – 30 April 2017	3 January ~ 16 October 2020
(2-469) - (1) - #793 ~ (2-653) - (185) - #975; 3. A.E. (2-654) - (1) - #976 (Korean) (in Korean) ~ (2-674) - (21) - #996 **(206)**
Jiro is the main character in this story. After the war between the Gosan family and the El family, the contents of Kuan's Fridge becomes known and the dispute surrounding it spreads to the world of underground criminal organization. In the confrontation between the Emperor and the Conqueror, and the Blank which is an independent Quanx organization are interfere in here, and the universe's strongest Quanx, Gongja, who's hidden among the Blank, is revealed. Jiro, who has the key of the fridge, comes and goes between the Emperor and the Conqueror and swayed by them, and in the process, he gets the information that he can earn big money when he becomes White Police Guards. On the other hand, the Bureau of Inspection of the U.C.S. dispatched an ace agent 'Sharp' in order to monitor and arrest Gongja's activities, who was the former subject of the experiment. 'Sharp', who sealed Gongja's Quanx ability, she confronts her and hears with the story of the contents of Kuan's fridge and conflicts, but soon brace herself. However, the superior of the Bureau of Inspection of the U.C.S., he conspires with underworld so Sharp is in danger of being killed by the Emperor's subordinates, so she unavoidably returns the Quanx ability, to Gongja's party. A few years later, some nobles who're against the El family (Gosan family), they're dependent on the Emperor, so the tensions between the Gosan family and the Emperor increased. Here, Lot's bad taste fun is creates a stir, and both the Emperor and the Gosan family go into a mortal battle. Nubre takes the supremacy of the underworld by replacing the Dark Lord Nob when the Emperor is disappeared by Gosan. Jiro, who became a member of the White Police Guards, made great strides in the battle with the Emperor, and then met his family and asked for forgiveness. However, when Jiro became clear that he was a junkie so he talked about behind the people's back, Haggler is relentlessly pushing him to leave the White Police Guards. In the end, Jiro leaves the White Police Guards and becomes the Dark Lord's subordinate as he introduced by his colleague to the training center. And Dike relies on the Dark Lord to escape the chase of the Church of Madonna, and the four shields are completed to protect the Dark Lord that a Devarim prophesied in the past.

Chapter 3

No.	Title	Original release date	English release date
1	Dike; Daikeu (다이크)	(Before interrupts) 1 May ~ 4 August 2017 (After interrupts) 12 August 2017 – 8 September 2019	17 October 2020 – 13 March 2022
(3-1) - (1) - #997 (Korean) (in Korean) ~ (3-366) - (366) - #1363
This is the fifth flashback story.
2	Epilogue; Epillogeu (에필로그)	12 September ~ 29 December 2019	16 March 2022 – 20 May 2022
(3-367) - (1) - #1364 (Korean) (in Korean) ~ (3-414) - (5-2) - #1414
This is the last story of Denma.

So, including the same worldviews, the 《Iron Dog John Doe》 (1998), 《Rami Record》 (2008) and Web fictions (2017), this is arranged in chronological order. This includes episodes that are predominant in the past.

- **《Rami Record》** → **《Iron Dog John Doe》** → 《Denma》 Chapter 2 Ep. 1 - **A Catnap** → Those Who Harvest Stars: Denma Episode 2 <The Idolatry> → 《Denma》 Chapter 1 Ep. 11 - **Sixteen** → The Sanctuary of the Planet Gaia: Denma Episode 3 <The Love Sick> → Physical Error Occurrence Report: Denma Episode 1 <The Puppet Show> → 《Denma》 Chapter 3 Ep. 1 - **Dike** → Chapter 1 Ep. 15 - **God's Lover** (past time) → Chapter 1 Ep. 1 - **A Dog of Pamana** ~ Chapter 1 Ep. 11 - **Savoy Gaal** = Chapter 1 Ep. 14 - **Pigear** → Chapter 1 Ep. 15 - **God's Lover** (present time) → Chapter 1 Ep. 16 - **A.E.** → Chapter 2 Ep. 2 - **Kuan's Fridge** → Chapter 2 Ep. 3 - **The knight** → Chapter 3 Ep. 2 - **Epilogue**

== Characters ==
Because there are so many characters in this work, they wrote it as an article in a web magazine.

There are characters appearing in the motif of the existing Korean singer. Min-G is motif to Minzy. And Z-Dragon is motif to G-Dragon. T와이스 (in Korean) (T와이스; Twaiseu) is motif to Twice, but the names of characters intactly appeared as Tzuyu, Mina, Sana.

=== Silverquick ===
- Denma (덴마; Denma): He first appeared in Chapter 1 Ep. 1 - A Dog of Pamana (1) - #1. Originally he was Dike (다이크; Daikeu) 'The Invincible Death (무혈사신; 無血死神; Muhyeolsasin) of Urano', and he was deceived by Silverquick, and he was used by neuro-scanning technique to enter a young child, Denma, and works as a deliverer. He's an Equivalent Mass Exchange Quanx. Although the name of the webtoon is Denma and the name of the main character is Denma, but he doesn't appear often. So the rumor that Denma isn't protagonist of Denma is constantly raised. However, the significant words of Korah (고라; Gora) and Jiro, who're Memory Reading Quanxs, and the scenes of the situation at the time when Yahwah discovered Denma, raise doubts as to whether or not Dike is in Denma's body, and it made the readers shocked and confused from the moment Master Sergent Hador took off his mask. It is becoming known that he is carrying out a project called 'Project Denma' at Church of Madonna, and his identity is gradually falling into the labyrinth. It's hard to know how much his Quanx power is compared to the average of the Silverquick deliverers. But the Equivalent Mass Exchange is a very rare technique in this work. On the other hand, in the Quanx fight, he needs to confirm the coordinates using the goggles. On both his palms there is a circle and its image which is El was ejected to Dike. This image is a sign of a person who is owned by El. He and Dike appeared as a villain in Yo! Villains. And they also appeared as the characters Denma with NAVER WEBTOON. They appeared as a hero in Densinma with NAVER WEBTOON.
  - Cell (셀; Sel): She first appeared in Chapter 1 Ep. 1 - A Dog of Pamana (1) - #1. She's mentioned for the first time in Ep. 1 - A Dog of Pamana (2) - #2. She's Denma's Eve. Her avatar is green. She appeared as a NPC in Yo! Villains. And she also appeared as a character of Denma with NAVER WEBTOON. She appeared as an item in Densinma with NAVER WEBTOON.
  - Quai (콰이; Kwai): It first appeared in Chapter 1 Ep. 1 - A Dog of Pamana (1) - #1. It's mentioned for the first time in Ep. 3 - Eve - #12. It's the android and it isn't Eve. Its forehead reveals Chinese characters or punctuation marks so it is able to communicate with people.
- Uriel (우리엘; Uriel): She first appeared in Chapter 1 Ep. 1 - A Dog of Pamana (1) - #1. She's mentioned for the first time in Chapter 1 Ep. 13 - A.E. (3) - #193. In the past, Dike thinks she resembles Guyrin and he contracted Silverquick. She's Yahwah's right-hand person. She appeared as a character of Denma with NAVER WEBTOON.
- Jet (제트; Jeteu): He first appeared in Chapter 1 Ep. 4 - Eve Rachel (1) - #13. His old English version's name was Zet. He's one of the Apple members who dreams of escaping with Denma while working as a deliverer of Silverquick. He officially uses gravity manipulation abilities in Silverquick. He's a self-proclaimed "A man that can easily handle 17 thugs" and has had a fellow relationship with Dike in the past. Originally his real name is Hank and he's using it to his Pentagon code name, but he uses the alias Jet, in Silverquick, and related to this, he's tied up with an old ill-fated relationship with Eunguy, who's new to Silvequick. He confronted Eunguy because of Yahwah's plan and was unilaterally beaten because he could not use the Quanx ability, but he made a leery alliance to him that he had a reason to bring Dike to the El family. His past has been mentioned a number of times, such as entering Wolve's Den in planet Urano, but it has not yet been known how he relates to the El family. His nickname is 'Junk Hank'. He appeared as a villain in Yo! Villains. And he also appeared as a character of Denma with NAVER WEBTOON. He appeared as a hero in Densinma with NAVER WEBTOON.
  - Bon (본; Bon): She first appeared in Chapter 1 Ep. 3 - Eve - #12. She's mentioned for the first time in Ep. 4 - Eve Rachel - #13. She's Jet's Eve. Her avatar is red. She appeared as a character of Denma with NAVER WEBTOON.
- Yahwah (야와; Yawa): He is first mentioned and his real body first appears in Chapter 1 Ep. 3 - Eve - #12. His avatar first appeared in Chapter 1 Ep. 4 - Eve Rachel (1) - #13. He is an avatar and she controls the Quanx delivers in Silverquick's station 7. He usually appears as a cute puppy shape, but when emotions get stronger, tattoos appear on the face and become menacing. He is Hyper-Quanx. One of his ability is Penetration. In the scene where he beats Eunguy, his body also turns into muscular. The deputy director of Internal Affairs says, 'He will go postal if he ever finds out where his body is.' He knows the existence of the Apple organization trying to escape Silverquick. He tells Jet to act actively, and he seems to be using them. In fact, he's a woman. She's referred to by Gosan as the 'shaman ghost'. Before, her real body appears like a girl with the orange pigtails. Her gender isn't revealed in the original version, but in the new English version, it translated she's male. It was mistranslated, but the readers are able to think of it as a setting that the Duke of Gosan knows her identity. She's added as a new character in Denma with NAVER WEBTOON. She appeared as a hero in Densinma with NAVER WEBTOON.
  - Adam (아담; Adam): They first appeared in Chapter 1 Ep. 4 - Eve Rachel (1) - #13. They teleport about everywhere in Silverquick Headquarters. They're Transcriptome. He appeared as a character of Denma with NAVER WEBTOON. He appeared as a hero in Densinma with NAVER WEBTOON.
  - Camael (카마엘; Kamael): Her nickname, Mama (마마; Mama) is first mentioned in Chapter 1 Ep. 13 - Marionette (2) - #156. She first appeared in Chapter 1 Ep. 15 - God's Lover (4) - #199. She looks like a female angel Adam. She's Yahwah's Transcriptome.
- Arcel (아셀; Asel): He first appeared in Chapter 1 Ep. 4 - Eve Rachel (2) - #14. He first appeared in Silverquick as trainee. When anger or sad emotion explodes, the Ephraimite, which emits a tremendous electromagnetic pulse from the body. His body is shifted to neuro-scanning technique like Denma, and Yahwah says that neuro-scanning technology can control Ephraimite Quanx's ability. Before the change, the original body was a woman named Edel (에델; Edel). In Silverquick, he's harassed by other deliver because of Yahwah's orders, and he cried, but when he drank, he said, 'Hot bombshells like me.' It turns out that the original body was directly opposite personalities. He's expected to play a significant role in the Denma's future, who's trying to escape Silverquick, because he's Ephraimite Quanx. He appeared as a hero in Densinma with NAVER WEBTOON.
- Crying Daddy (크라잉 대디; Keuraing Daedi): He first appeared in Chapter 1 Ep. 5 - Blackout (1) - #16. He's Ephraimite Quanx. He appeared as a character of Denma with NAVER WEBTOON.
- Eunguy (응가이; Eunggai): He first appeared in Chapter 1 Ep. 11 - A.E. - #48. He first appeared in rescuing Arcel, who's being harassed by Ballack (발락; Balrak) who's another trainee of Silverquick. He appears again in episode 'God's Lover'. He turns out that he's Randolph (랜돌프; Raendolpeu), he was one of the Pentagon members. Pentagon is a group of Savoy who was hunted Quanxs. As Ballack start an argument again, he pull out his head. He's Hyper-Quanx. Perhaps the one of his ability is superhuman strength. And he's hated by Yahwah, because he is planned to use Arcel's Ephraimite Quanx ability, and he accept the role of harassing Arcel after Yahwah's beating and intimidation. However, he shows a bit of different harassment from the harassment imaginable by the reader. He forms a temporary alliance with Jet to find Dike. He has El's mark on his palms, and he has to give him Dike. When his asking Jet, 'Do you even realize what that money meant for me?' he seems to have a past history related to El. He appeared as a character of Denma with NAVER WEBTOON. He appeared as a hero in Densinma with NAVER WEBTOON.
- Edel (이델; Idel): He first appeared in Chapter 1 Ep. 11 - Savoy Gaal (4) - #52. His old English version's name was Ithel. He appears as a Silverquick management staff and a Church of Madonna priest dispatched, and he supports Denma. Using planar constraint ability (dimensional manipulation ability) that puts the target in three dimensions in two dimensions. He's wearing G-string that shocked Denma. The secret of this G-string is revealed in episode 'Sixteen', which deals with his past history. The episode 'Sixteen' appears to have been part of the Church of Madonna's plan, as well as Ran has calculating causality, for him and Balak, the father for the beginning of a new story, and the son for the end of the story. According to his uncle, "Stay invisible because I'll put you in an invisible department." he's steadily working as a priest at the Silverquick headquarters. He appeared as a villain in Yo! Villains. And he also appeared as 2 characters of Denma with NAVER WEBTOON. The guardian priest Edel is added as a new character in Denma with NAVER WEBTOON. He appeared as a hero in Densinma with NAVER WEBTOON.
- Dwight (드웨이트; Deuweiteu): He first appeared in Chapter 1 Ep. 13 – Marionette (1) - #155. He's Marionette Quanx. He throws his life so keeps Esmela (이스멜라; Iseumelra)'s dead body. His younger brother, Jacobo (야고보; Yagobo) is the main character of The Puppet Show of Web fiction Record the Quanx - Denma S.E. and he's also Marionette Quanx.
- Hoon (훈; Hun): He first appeared in Chapter 1 Ep. 14 - Pigear (2) - #159. He's a Space Distortion Quanx. He belonged to Tanza's Pigear poacher team, because of Ivon (아이본; Aibon), but later contracted on to Silverquick. He appeared as a character of Denma with NAVER WEBTOON.

==== Recipients ====
- Jinu (지누; Jinu): He first appeared in Chapter 1 Ep. 1 - A Dog of Pamana (2) - #2. He's Denma's recipient. He moved from planet Pamana to planet Terra 20 years ago. He has wife and a son. He asked Silverquick to rid of the source of power drainer (Max (dog)) using a portable EMP bomb.
  - Max (dog) (맥스; Maekseu): He first appeared in Chapter 1 Ep. 1 - A Dog of Pamana (1) - #1. He's the source of power drainer. He was a living dog. He got sick and his consciousness is transferred to a robot via costly Artificial neurological cell procedure. He's dead by EMP bomb. He appeared as a character of Denma with NAVER WEBTOON.
- Hardok (하독; Hadok): He first appeared in Chapter 1 Ep. 2 - Captain Hardok (1) - #5. He's Denma's recipient. He's Captain of Edoms, who are pirates from the planet Recca. His real name was Hitcher Greg. He was throws his livelihood to save his wife Mirael and his daughter May (Captain Hardok) and became space pirate. He's executed, but soon he forged his identity and living again on the planet Terra in the name of Edom. He appeared as a character of Denma with NAVER WEBTOON.
  - Min-G (민G; Yael): She first appeared in Chapter 1 Ep. 2 - Captain Hardok (2) - #6. She's an idol singer. Even pirates are enthusiastic about her. The Emperor (King) offered her a satellite, but she refused. 17 years ago, she was a baby of the refugee children of turtleship. She appeared as a character of Denma with NAVER WEBTOON.
- Yael (야엘; Yael): He first appeared in Chapter 1 Ep. 7 - Yael Road (1) - #25. He's Denma's recipient. He's Negevian. He's the clerk of the house of representatives on planet Negev. He's withstands any humiliation, for his beliefs.
- Naomi (나오미; Naomi): She first appeared in Chapter 1 Ep. 9 - Mandragora (1) - #38. She's Denma's recipient. She's sister of Goel Orthodox Church. She's added as a new character in Denma with NAVER WEBTOON.
- Mario: He's Jet's recipient. See Nobles.
- God (고드; Godeu): He first appeared in Chapter 1 Ep. 15 - God's Lover (15) - #210. He's Denma's recipient. God is read Goad and according to the Bellarian pronunciation. Before he died, his memory and consciousness were copied onto a device through the Artificial neurological cell procedure. He usually appears as a cute black cat. He was a violent and a ruthless and selfish tyrant of A.N.G.E.L. Town. He loves May (God's Lover), but he dead and living in a network. He appeared as a villain in Yo! Villains. And he's added as a new character in Denma with NAVER WEBTOON. He and Cat God appeared as heroes in Densinma with NAVER WEBTOON.
- Jiro (지로; Jiro): He first appeared in Chapter 2 Ep. 2 - Kuan's Fridge (7) - #538. He last appeared in Chapter 2 3. A.E. (19) - #994. He is a drug junkie Quanx. He's Partial Teleporting Quanx. It seems that he can't be rehabilitated. He appeared as 2 characters of Denma with NAVER WEBTOON.

=== Church of Madonna ===
- Abigail (아비가일; Abigail): He first appeared in the 《Iron Dog John Doe》. And he second appeared in the 《Rami Record》 (2) = Denma Chapter 2 S.E. (2-186) - (1) - #508. He third appeared in the Denma Chapter 1 Ep. 12 - Sixteen (13) - #100. In the 《Iron Dog John Doe》, he's the protagonist, and he's a fighter (iron dog). In the Rami Record and Denma, he protects Deva Agnes with other guardian priests such as June, (Denma) (준; Jun). He's first mentioned in the Denma Chapter 2 (2-1) - Ep. 1 - A Catnap (1) - #323, and he's fourth appeared in (4) - #326. He has a girl's name. Later, Iron Dog John Doe becomes his nickname. He appeared as a character of Denma with NAVER WEBTOON. He appeared as a hero in Densinma with NAVER WEBTOON.
- Rami (라미; Rami): She first appeared in the Rami Record (2) = Denma Chapter 2 S.E. (2-186) - (1) - #508. And she's second appeared in the Denma Chapter 2 (2-1) - Ep. 1 - A Catnap (1) - #323. She's the protagonist of the 《Rami Record》. She's a pre-priestess who's attending Mission School, the House of Dancing Flowers, which is established by Church of Madonna. She and her younger brother Jay (제이; Jei), and her younger sister, Soy (소이; Soi) are orphan children, and she tries to become a Deva because of money. She appeared as a character of Denma with NAVER WEBTOON.
- Agnes (아그네스; Ageuneseu): She first appeared in the 《Rami Record》 (2) = Denma Chapter 2 S.E. (2-186) - (1) - #508. And she's second appeared in the Denma Chapter 1 Ep. 12 - Sixteen (13) - #100. In Rami Record and Chapter 2 A Catnap, she reveals the past that, she was protected by Abigail and she was Deva of charge of the Duke which was Patron of the Church of Madonna. In Denma Chapter 1 Sixteen, she is a Bishop and appears with one eye covered with an eye patch. She puts pressure on Baron Hussadin. She is the source of loyalty that her Guardian priest, Abigail, she made him cross the time axis, and when a man mess around with her, his planet becomes an hourglass shape. The Head Bishop tells Agnes can use the medicine (drug), and Haaken, who had been a Guardian priest before Abigail, also called her "Evil Girl" If the readers look at this, it seems that there is a different side to what she is showing now. She's added as a new character in Denma with NAVER WEBTOON.
- Nell (넬; Nel): She first appeared in Chapter 1 Ep. 12 - Sixteen (1) - #88. Edel loves her. She was Baron Hussadin's one of Devas. She suffers from the Space disease. She appeared as a villain in Yo! Villains. And she also appeared as a character of Denma with NAVER WEBTOON. She appeared as an item in Densinma with NAVER WEBTOON.
- Balak (Balack) (발락; Balrak): He first appeared in Chapter 1 Ep. 12 - Sixteen (2) - #89. He's the uncle of Edel, a priest of the Church of Madonna priest working in the Silverquick's station 7. Like Edel, he uses the dimensional manipulation ability. He first appears as a seminary teacher who seems to womanizer and proud of muscle. However, in the process of taking care of Edel, the past Internal Affairs and one of the 'Church of Madonna's 3 crazy dogs' was revealed and he shows the pride of a wonderful uncle. However, when he passed on to the Chapter 2, his past was revealed, and compared with White Police Guards and his battle power, the majesty of the hellhound was greatly reduced. Between the episodes Chapter 2 'A Catnap' and Chapter 1 'Sixteen', why he became a regular priest like a seminary teacher is given only a short hint like 'planet Toshka case', and in the end of the episode 'Sixteen', he becomes a Director of Internal Affairs after 6~7 years. He appeared as a villain in Yo! Villains. And he also appeared as a character of Denma with NAVER WEBTOON. He appeared as a hero in Densinma with NAVER WEBTOON.
- Ran (란; Ran): He first appeared in Chapter 1 Ep. 12 - Sixteen (19) - #106. He's called the "One who oversees the universal causality" or the "Handler of the principle of causality" and appears as a young baby with dark skin tone. In episode 'Sixteen', he calculates the causality and decides he leaves Edel alone, because the aim of wake-up-call the Patrons who support the Church of Madonna. In episode 'A Catnap', he decides the samples are almost collected from the holy visits and now that the Intersecting Space of the parallel universe will shut down for quite a while. And he explains intergalactic courier business, that church body has been preparing and they need Quanx for courier guys as a part of the business plan and they'll be going on missions without knowing that they're. He feels Rami's sadness so he seems to be able to share the feelings of the Super-Transcriptome. He seems to be controlling everything by calculating causality and predicting the future. He appeared as a hero in Densinma with NAVER WEBTOON.
- Gatsu (가츠; Gacheu): He first appeared in Chapter 1 Ep. 12 - Sixteen (25) - #112. He appears as the head of Internal Affairs and using Edel, returns Balak to the Black Chapter and takes him under his command. At this time, he's trying to completely dash Balak's spirits, such as he orders to Balak that kiss his feet. He has the ability to penetrate anything, and every time he uses his powers he makes a gun shape with his fingers and shouts "Bang." He also has a healing skill, so he's Hyper-Quanx who has more than two skills. His past at the time of the Internal Affairs appeared in 'A Catnap', but there's no reason why he hasn't fall out with Balak. He's presumed to be one of the 'two white rats' that Balak said he has got to hunt down, so 7 years later, he was likely to have been handled by Balak, the director of Internal Affairs. He appeared as a character of Denma with NAVER WEBTOON. He appeared as a hero in Densinma with NAVER WEBTOON.
- Max (막스; Makseu): He first appeared in Chapter 1 Ep. 12 - Sixteen (26) - #113. He appears as the Deputy head of Internal Affairs and he led a group that was against captain Gatsu in the Internal Affairs. He commands the execution of Edel, against Gatsu who escaped Edel to escape Balak, but after he has seen the evidence of Toshka case, he refuses to kills Balak, and persuades Gatsu to betray and act together. He has a Quanx ability to separate two fists from his body and move. Before the episode 'A Catnap', he was used to be a WFC light-heavyweight fighter, so in A Catnap, he easily beats Balack (Balak), who had exercised hard in a physical fight. Before he became the Deputy head of Internal Affairs, he was a team leader of the Security Department, and competes with Gatsu for the outcome. He's presumed to be one of the 'two white rats' that Balak said he has got to hunt down, so 7 years later, he was likely to has been handled by Balak, the director of Internal Affairs. He appeared as a character of Denma with NAVER WEBTOON.
- Hades (하데스; Hadeseu): He first appeared in Chapter 2 (2-1) - Ep. 1 - A Catnap (1) - #323. He's one of the Church of Madonna's 3 crazy dogs along with Abigail and Balak. He looks exactly like the rice cake (Adam) that controls the Quanx deliverers in Silverquick. He has a basic teleport ability and is a Hyper-Quanx that has the ability to squish anything and make it like a cube. However, he also suffered to Honma, who's the average among White Police Guards, so he's reducing the dignity of the Church of Madonna's 3 crazy dogs. He's trapped in a prison of Church of Madonna, and he attacks Palace in accordance with the orders of the upper orders, and tries to get out of the universe eight through the Intersecting Space. However, even if the attempt succeeds, Hades of the universe eight doesn't disappear, but different Hades exist in different universes other than the universe eight, and this affects the future of the universe eight considerably. He appeared as a character of Denma with NAVER WEBTOON. He appeared as a hero in Densinma with NAVER WEBTOON.
- Haaken (하아켄; Haaken): He first appeared in Chapter 2 (2-72) - Ep. 1 - A Catnap (72) - #394. He is mentioned for the first time in (2-73) - Ep. 1 - A Catnap (73) - #395. In 'A Catnap', at the past, he is a prisoner in a solitary cell of the Internal Affairs, and escapes together when Hades and the other prisoners are breakout from prison. Abigail says he uses the same skill as he does, so it turns out that he has an Acceleration Quanx ability. He seems to have an ill feeling about Agnes. He said 'My daughter Guyrin', it revealed that he's Guyrin's father. Someone slipped that plan that day to El, so he couldn't keep his family. He was also Kaiser's friend, and he's associated with the Wolve's Den (늑대굴; Neukdaegul). He appeared as characters of Denma with NAVER WEBTOON, one is Haaken and the other is Assassin Haaken.
- Honma (혼마; Honma): He first appeared in Chapter 2 (2-77) - Ep. 1 - A Catnap (77) - #399. He is mentioned for the first time in (2-83) - Ep. 1 - A Catnap (83) - #405. When Hades was escaped again, he appears as an agent of the Security Department. At this time, Max's position in the Security Department is narrowed so no one wants to go with him. He teams up with Max and goes to guard the Palace. He has a reflex ability to send again his attack to his opponent. In fact he is a Hyper-Quanx of the White Police Guards. He tells himself that his power is only average among the White Police Guards, but even if he was hit by Hades, who's one of the Church of Madonna's 3 crazy dogs, he shows superior combat power enough to be angry with just one hit. When his emotions get stronger, the tattoos appear on his face, and he talk 'You dirty piece', like this he has way of talking, which is also Yahwah's way of talking. But he is also a kind-hearted guy that he can't turn a kid's face away. He appeared as a character of Denma with NAVER WEBTOON.
- Head Bishop (총무주교; Chongmujugyo): She first appeared in Chapter 2 (2-184) - Ep. 1 - A.E. (13) - #506. She is mentioned for the first time in (2-302) - Ep. 2 - Kuan's Fridge (93) - #624. She first appears when she reported by Kanu what Duke has done to planet Aorica. She seems to be in a fairly high position within the church body, with most of the decisions on the church's business being made. She witnessed the power of White Police Guards, the Duke's guards, and made White Snakes, the strongest combat Guardian priest organization, but in the episode 'Kuan's Fridge', while 2 White Snakes priests are killed by one White Police Guards' member. She seems to be harbor some dark secrets in what the church is doing now, as she decides whom to choose as a church partner between the El family and the Gosan family and reveals her ambition to become a master of the universe eight.

=== Nobles ===
Here includes slaves, servants and bodyguards of the nobles.

- Mario (마리오; Mario): He is first appeared in Chapter 1 Ep. 14 - Pigear (3) - #160]. He's Jet's recipient. He's a noble. He likes Sylvia (실비아; Silbia), his female Pigear.

==== Gosan family ====
- Gosan (고산; Gosan): He is mentioned for the first time in Chapter 1 Ep. 15 - God's Lover (78) - #273. He first appeared in Chapter 1 Ep. 15 - God's Lover (93) - #288. He's a Duke. He puts a bread bag on his head and taps on a calculator. The planet Bella and Terra both ask him to mediate, suggesting that his influence is on many planets. In God's Lover A.E., they call each other with his cousin, 'Breadhead' and 'Baldhead'. He also talks about Yahwah as 'shaman ghost' and knows her identity. He doesn't reveal his face with his father, the Duke, and wears a bread bag, he has a powerful security guard, the new White Police Guards, and goes beyond the power of the Duke's old White Police Guards. Haggler is his personal bodyguard who's the one he always keeps around. While there are many guesses about his face in his bread bag, and he seems to be caught up in the plans of the El family and Church of Madonna, but he takes off his bread bag so he makes a twist. His face in the bread bag gives a big shock to the readers, and he's one of the people who contributed to the formula, "When a character takes off one's mask, the readers shocked." He appeared as a villain in Yo! Villains. He's added as a new character in Densinma with NAVER WEBTOON.
- Duke (공작; Gongjak): He is mentioned for the first time in Chapter 2 1. A Catnap (53) - #375. He first appeared in Chapter 2 1. A Catnap (54) - #376. In episode 'A Catnap', he appears as one of heads of the Patron alliance who tries to find his Deva Agnes, at the time. He calculates all the causalities with 'Dr. Faust's calculator', which calculates his death and he takes a calm attitude at that moment. However, when Agnes had bad thing, he shows himself a romanticist that immediately crushes his calculator and turns the planet Aorica into an hourglass shape. He have the White Police Guards, which is a guard team to break a planet, and he made the Gosan family reign as the number one in the universe eight. Because of Agnes' event, he said, "It seems that this event will extend my life a little!" Because of this, the readers questioned his death.
- Gosan's cousin: He first appeared in Chapter 1 Ep. 15 - God's Lover (55) - #250. He first appeared as a Director of Pax Industries, and has been cooperating with the Church of Madonna, including as Yahwah protested him to against the leakage of neuro-scanning technology. He's no name yet, and in God's Lover A.E., they call each other with the Duke of Gosan, 'Breadhead' and 'Baldhead'. His father's older brother, the Duke, calls him to manage the Gosan family, and says that he'll be dead soon. When the Duke invited him to manage the Gosan family, he also told him that he is a leader of his own group. After the Duke's death, he appears to be practically managing most of the Gosan family's chores, including the work with the U.C.S., and the interchange with the Church of Madonna, and the business work of the Gosan family. He is in conflict with Duke Gosan who's wearing a bread bag, and he wants to quit the Gosan family and it seemed to he is fooled by Dr. Kitten's advice to assassinate Gosan, but everything changed as Gosan wear bread bags.

===== White Police Guards =====
- Daniel (다니엘; Daniel): He first appeared in Chapter 1 Ep. 15 - God's Lover (104) - #299. He appears as a bodyguard who's called by Gosan to threaten the butler who's informing Bella and Terra each of the Duke of Gosan's orders. He beats to God's avatar robot and takes the owner of the planet Bella to Duke of Gosan. In Chapter 2, Lot is angry at the betrayal, he appears again to prevent him from going to Duke Gosan. In the process of fighting Lot, his attacked part by him shows an ability to recover immediately. Even if his neck cut off, he's recovered immediately. And he read to Hazz's memories. He's a Hyper-Quanx. And he can interplanetary teleporting as much as a person of White Police Guards. He can be regarded as one of the closest bodyguards of the Duke of Gosan among the White Police Guards when he's seen from the time of God's Lover. He's the main character of The Idolatry of Web fiction Record the Quanx - Denma S.E. He was an assassin of the Goel Orthodox Church and sent to the zealot to kill Caesar (가이사; Gaisa), the leader of Blank (블랭크; Beullaengkeu) of the planet Synagogue. He cuts Caesar's right arm, but when he hears his words, he gets caught by his guards, Gaya, and by chance he stands on the Blank side. In discipline, Caesar is a master, and Gaya is a senior disciple, and he is a general disciple. Instead he also taught Gaya about the many customs of the gangland and the information that only the assassin knows, such as the situation of the universe eight. He feels nervous that Gaya has hidden dangerous powers. Later, he becomes an executive but still struggles with back-up work with new leader of Blank, Karp (카프; Kapeu), and Gaya. In a sermon of Blank, he gave a tough answer to the story, and later the newcomer Vashti (와스디; Waseudi) makes a similar remark, he feels a sense of demeaning. After the end of the sermon, he makes a suggestion to Vashti, clearing it together, then separating her head and body and killing her. In fact, Vashti was the assassin who tried to kill Caesar, and her dead body was settled by him and Gaya. He appeared as a character of Denma with NAVER WEBTOON.
- Honma: See Church of Madonna.

==== El family ====
- Guyrin (가이린; Gairin): She is mentioned for the first time in Chapter 1 Ep. 1 - A Dog of Pamana (1) - #1. She first appeared in Chapter 1 Ep. 5 - Blackout (3) - #19. She was Dike's old lover and Denma always thinks he must return to her. Denma remembers that she was kidnapped to El, but in episode 'Savoy Gaal', she didn't believe in Dike, and that she needed to protected by El, and that she asked Gaal to sold her for El through the slave market. She then reappears in the El family with El and his son, Cain. She appeared as a character of Denma with NAVER WEBTOON.
- El (엘; El): He is mentioned for the first time in Chapter 1 Ep. 5 - Blackout (3) - #19. He first appeared in Chapter 1 Ep. 7 - Yael Road (3) - #27. Guyrin asked Gaal to sold her for him through the slave market. He's the Count/Earl of planet Urano, and his nickname is Little Conqueror of Urano, and his full name is El Rinyo Areukedillama Nubeure Sosyekiaseu (엘 리뇨 아르케딜라마 누브레 소셰키아스; El Rinyo Areukedillama Nubeure Sosyekiaseu, Expected name: El Linyo Archedillama Nubre Soshekias). He wearing a mask, and his face seems to make the opponent quite uncomfortable. In the past, with 'Joshua's eye', he deals with the Duke, who's Duke of Gosan's father, and eventually gains exclusive right to the Zipnight through this deal and gains considerable influence in the universe eight. He received considerable recognition from the Duke and received to the additional dispatch of the White Police Guards, and he named them that "El's Five Fingers". After that, the El family and the Gosan family are confront about the hegemony of the universe eight, so he makes guards to fight against new White Police Guards, including 백전사; Baekjeonsa who're bought and made old White Police Guards, and Red Wolves, an elite guard who's made up of Quanxs. Guyrin appears in the El family with he and his son, Cain. He can project his image (mark) on his owned people and convey his feelings and health condition wherever he is. He's added as a new character in Denma with NAVER WEBTOON.
- Hazz (하즈; Hazu): He is mentioned for the first time in Chapter 2 Ep. 1 - A Catnap (61) - #383. He first appeared in Chapter 2 Ep. 1 - A.E. (2) - #495. He's pig butler of the El family. 20 years ago, when El was doing business with the Duke, who's Gosan's father. After that, he made a relationship with the Duke through White Police Guards, revealing his ambition to make El as the king of the universe eight. If there's Ran to calculate the causality at the Church of Madonna, and if there're Faust's causality calculators at the Gosan family, the El family makes a composition of the eight universe power competition with his plot. At the present time, when Church of Madonna and the Gosan family started to fight against each other because of power, the El family showed a way to cope with the situation through him. Later, he created a relationship with Duke through the White Police Guards, and raised the El family, an ordinary noble family, to show El's ambition to become king of the universe eight. The Church of Madonna has Ran to calculate the causal rate, and the Gosan family has Faust's causality calculators, the El family has him so they construct a power competition of the universe eight. As a trial of strength between the Church of Madonna and the Gosan family and the El family begin in earnest, when the opponent look ahead into their future, he looks far ahead into the future.
- Ayn (아인; Ain): He first appeared in Chapter 2 Ep. 2 - A.E. (9) - #516. He is an accountant with the accounting and auditing team and an accounting manager of the El family. He's the one of Cain's men. He's Marvin's junior and he always keeps around. He appeared as a character of Denma with NAVER WEBTOON.
- Marvin (마빈; Mabin): He first appeared in Chapter 2 Ep. 2 - A.E. (9) - #516. He is an accountant with the accounting and auditing team and an accounting of the El family, who is in charge of mergers and acquisitions of the company under the direction of El's son, Cain. Ayn is his junior and he always keeps around. He's the one of Cain's men so he delivers what Cain does, to Hazz. At the same time, he is a spy who's meet the old White Police Guards and transfers hacked information of the El family to the Gosan family. He is tired and thinks, 'Gotta quit this spying job soon...'.
- Cain (카인; Kain): He first appeared in Chapter 2 Ep. 2 - A.E. (9) - #516. He's El's son. Marvin is deliver what he does, to Hazz. Guyrin appears in the El family with El and his son, him.

===== El's Five Fingers =====
- Federick (페드릭; Pedeurik): He first appeared in Chapter 2 Ep. 1 - A Catnap (62) - #384. When Count El went to deal with the Duke, who's Gosan's father, he was one of the White Police Guards who dispatched him to El as one of the most trusted bodyguards. As a combat style Hyper-Quanx, this work isn't mentioned how he used Quanx ability except teleportation. He's added as a new character in Denma with NAVER WEBTOON.
- Lot (롯; Rot): He first appeared in Chapter 2 Ep. 1 - A Catnap (165) - #487. He is mentioned for the first time in Chapter 2 Ep. 1 - A Catnap (167) - #489. He was the only White Police Guard Duke came to pick up Agnes in the Aorica incident. He mentioned quite a lot about his superior combat power, such as "I can maybe handle around three hundred of Quanxs", and "He's so strong he can beat his superiors." Since then, he has been one of the five White Police Guards people dispatched to the El family, which is the 'Middle Finger' of El's five fingers. He's cool to decide that he should have a new owner to give him more money if he reject him, but he has not completely abandoned his loyalty to Gosan. He says, "What you just saw might look simple, but it's a combination of not one, not two, but three Quanx skills.", and he shows the ability of putting the body part into the inner parts of the body. It was already implied in his first appearance that he is a top strong man in the White Police Guards, the strongest elite group. He is a strongest combat Hyper-Quanx, and he is one of the few Hyper-Quanx that can be used in combination with each ability. He is at the top of the White Police Guards, and he beat up his superiors. His ability to tell he can maybe handle around 300 of 'The Thousand Men' which is Aorica's vigilante is also transcendent in this work's world view. However, it is hard to see that he is 300 times stronger and capable than 300 people, and he has not shown a wide range of destructive power besides Quanx vs. Quanx fight. Since then, he has been one of the five White Police Guards members dispatched to the El family, which is El's 'Middle Finger' of the El's Five Fingers. If their master really abandons them, he decides that he get whoever's paying more as their new master, so he's cool. His friend is Nieun (ㄴ). He's one of students of Gongja. He appeared as a villain in Yo! Villains. And he also appeared as 2 characters of Denma with NAVER WEBTOON. He appeared as a hero in Densinma with NAVER WEBTOON.
- Gaya (가야; Gaya): She first appeared in Chapter 2 Ep. 2 - A.E. (11) - #518. She's the main character of The Idolatry of Web fiction Record the Quanx - Denma S.E. She's Caesar's bodyguard. Caesar is the leader of Blank of the planet Synagogue. She catches Daniel, who's an assassin of the Goel Orthodox Church. In discipline, Caesar is a master, and she is a senior disciple, and Daniel is a general disciple. Instead Daniel also taught her about the many customs of the gangland and the information that only the assassin knows, such as the situation of the universe eight. Daniel feels nervous that she has hidden dangerous powers. Later, Daniel becomes an executive but still struggles with back-up work with new leader of Blank, Karp (카프; Kapeu), and her. Daniel kills new Blank member Vashti, because she's the assassin who tried to kill Caesar, and her dead body was settled by him and her. She appeared as a character of Denma with NAVER WEBTOON.

=== Gangland ===
- Emperor (패왕; 覇王; Paewang): He's mentioned for the first time in Chapter 1 Ep. 2 - Captain Hardok (2) - #6. He first appeared in Chapter 2 Ep. 2 - Kuan's Fridge (41) - #572. His old English version's name was Supreme Ruler. His new English version's another name was King. He's the emperor who's the master of the black market of the universe eight. He has Gyu-oh's back. He's Min-G's fan so he offered her a satellite, but she refused.
  - Consonant Guards
    - Giyeok (ㄱ) (기역; Giyeok): He's one of students of Gongja. He appeared as a character of Denma with NAVER WEBTOON.
    - Nieun (ㄴ) (니은; Nieun): He's Lot's friend. He's one of students of Gongja.
    - Rieul (ㄹ) (리을; Rieul): She's one of students of Gongja. She appeared as a character of Denma with NAVER WEBTOON.
- Gyu-oh (규오; Gyuo): He first appeared in Chapter 2 Ep. 2 - Kuan's Fridge (40) - #571. He's a gang member from the Emperor's planet Moab branch, and he's in charge of the Moab's accounting. He appeared as a character of Denma with NAVER WEBTOON.
- Conqueror (태왕; 太王; Taewang): He first appeared in Chapter 2 Ep. 3 - The knight (9) - #799. He's a gang boss of the planet Moab.
- Gongja (공자; Gongja): She first appeared in Chapter 2 Ep. 3 - The knight (17) - #806. She has a lot of students including Giyeok (ㄱ), Nieun (ㄴ), Digeut (ㄷ), Rieul (ㄹ), and Lot. She appeared as a character of Denma with NAVER WEBTOON. She appeared as a hero in Densinma with NAVER WEBTOON.

=== Devarims ===
- Aaron (아론; Aron): He's mentioned for the first time in Chapter 1 Ep. 5 - Blackout (3) - #19. He first appeared in Chapter 1 Ep. 7 - Yael Road (7) - #31. His old English version's name was Aron. He first appeared as Mirai's teacher, and both Denma and Jet seem to know him. He's a member of the Devarim race who see the future through dreams. He reappears in episode 'A Catnap' and works on firearms and machines, include removing Hades' signal device. He seems to be one of the heads of Devarim who is actually leading the members of the against the church. He looking at the future through his dreams, and prophecy that after the competition between the two figures, they both disappear and at the same time, they get to exist in different forms, they exist, yet they don't. He says that Devarim's precognitive dreams shows them the variables from the outer space, so this is surpass the calculation of causality in the long run. He calls the El family as the master of the universe eight and asks them to protect them, but they can't be sure that they'll not lie about the future. He's added as a new character in Denma with NAVER WEBTOON.
- Mirai Datsu (미라이 닷수; Mirai Datsu): She first appeared in Chapter 1 Ep. 11 - Savoy Gaal (2) - #50. She appears as a maker of weapon at Carlburn and seems to have considerable skills in making weapons, such as trading with her only because Gaal can believe and uses things. Denma thinks her weapon can penetrate Transcriptomes that, he wants to use in his escape plan. Because of this, she is caught to the church body and now she is confined to a storage in the church. Denma thinks her about old Aaron's prodigy apprentice, and Aaron also says that she is a child of God in the Devarim race, and she saw a far greater future than other Devarims. It suggesting that her actions would have had a considerable impact on future developments. She appeared as a character of Denma with NAVER WEBTOON.

=== Carlburn's Quanx Legion ===
- Nasty Jade (불쾌한 제이드; Bulkwaehan Jeideu): He first appeared in Chapter 1 Ep. 2 - Captain Hardok (2) - #6. His old English version's name was Ugly Jade. He's dispatched by Colonel Sean to catch captain Hardok. He appeared in a French Internet article.
- Sergeant Maggie (메기 중사; 메기 中士; Megi Jungsa): He first appeared in Chapter 1 Ep. 2 - A.E. - #11. His old English version's name was Sergeant Megi. He's Repair Quanx. He sees the video who captured on Denma's Quanx ability and collects and sells to the Savoys for 20 percent of the price of Quanx. He's familiar with Master Sergeant Hador.
- Master Sergeant Hador (하도르 상사; 하도르 上士; Hadore Sangsa): He's mentioned for the first time in Chapter 1 Ep. 2 - A.E. - #11. He first appeared in Chapter 1 Ep. 15 - God's Lover (5) - #200. His old English version's name was Master Sergeant Hadore. When Sergeant Maggie talks to Nasty Jade, who says that Denma uses the same skills as Master Sergeant Hador. He's aware of the existence of Denma with the same ability as himself and tracing the evidence. And he asks for an internal investigation to Silverquick, but conversely, the church body finds proposer, he retires from the Legion. He seems to be rescued the battalion commander on Urano, and he can recover his body in the Carlburn's Quanx Legion. When it saw that he could get some information about the Quanxs spread all across the universe eight in the Carlburn's Quanx Legion, he seems to be looking for someone in Silverquick. He had a nightmare which is someone called him "Hey, Uncle...", and he since he does not have his right hand, so the Korean readers were assumed him to Uncle. But when his mask peeled off, they were confused. He's added as a new character in Denma with NAVER WEBTOON.

== Production ==
In South Korea, the author is often criticized because his serialized work is delayed frequently.

Serialization of the Korean Denma was interrupted from Chapter 2 Ep. 2 - Kuan's Fridge (180) - #715 (29 July 2014). And the series returned 6 July 2015. The author received protests from many readers because of this interruption. However, as the author revealed the peripeteia, the fans come back again and regained the work's popularity.

It was again interrupted from Chapter 3 Ep. 1 - Dike (41) - #1041 (4 August 2017) and it returned 12 August after attending his mother-in-law's funeral.

The English version available on WEBTOON is same here. Translation of English Denma (Old English version) was interrupted from Chapter 1 Ep. 12 - Sixteen A.E. (1) - #145 (5 November 2015) and return on 7 January 2017. New episodes are translated on 15 July 2017, Chapter 1 Ep. 12 - Sixteen A.E. (2) - #146. Also the English version is far behind the native Korean version.

In the English version, they skipped Rami Record. The reason why this work isn't translated is presumed to be the religious problem (Christianity) and the political problem (North Korean defectors) of chapter 1. Therefore, this work has no official translation. It may be due to copyright problems with Yahoo!, but the Japanese edition has been translated and the title is (S.E.) ラミレコード.

== Media ==
On 7 November 2016, Air Seoul announced that it had collaborated with Naver WEBTOON to produce safety video. Some of the works shown here include Denma, The Sound of Heart, and Noblesse. At this time, Denma, Cell, Quai, and Adams are appeared.

=== Volumes ===
No.	Release date	ISBN
1	20 January 2015	9791157401017
Chapter .01: A Dog of Pamana (파마나의 개; Pamanaui Gae); Chapter .02: Captain Hardok (해적선장 하독; Haejeokseonjang Hadok); A.E.; Chapter .03: EVE (이브; Ibeu); Chapter .04: Eve Rachel (이브 라헬; Ibeu Rahel); Chapter .05: Blackout (블랙아웃; Beulraekaut); A.E.; Chapter .06: Band of Brothers (밴드 오브 브라더스; Baendeu obeu beuradeoseu); Chapter .07: Yael Road (야엘 로드; Yael Rodeu); A.E.; Chapter .08: Supervisor Bahel's How to Kill (반장 바헬의 하우 투 킬; Banjang Baherui Hau tu Kil); A.E.
2	20 January 2015	9791157401024
Chapter .09: Mandragora (만드라고라; Mandeuragora) Note: Beer-Lahai-Ros Imitatros (, A mimicry-species) (Tips: 모태종, 브엘라해로이 이미테이트로스; Tips: Motaejong Beuellahaeroi imiteiteuroseu); A.E.; A.E.; Chapter .11: Savoy Gaal (사보이 가알; Saboi Gaal); A.E.; Chapter .10: Tips: For Supervisor Edrei (반장 에드레이를 위한; Banjang Edeureireul Wihan)
3	20 January 2015	9791157401031
Chapter .12: Sixteen (식스틴; Sikseutin); A.E.; Chapter .13: Marionette (마리오네트; Marioneteu)

On 19 December 2014, Neo-Cartoon (네오카툰; Neokatun), the subsidiary company of Consonants and Vowels (자음과 모음; Jaeumgwa moeum) has announced that Denma will be printed soon. And on 20 January 2015, it published one to three books. Volume 1 is published until Chapter 1 Ep. 9 - A.E. - #37, volume 2 is Chapter 1 Ep. 11 - A.E. - #87, volume 3 is Chapter 1 Ep. 13 - Marionette (3) - #157.

No.	Release date	ISBN
4	26 January 2016	9791157401291
Chapter .14: Pigear (피기어; Pigieo); A.E.; Chapter .15-1: God's Lover (God's lover)

Volume 4 has been published on 26 January 2016, it's until Chapter 1 Ep. 15 - God's Lover (46) - #241.

No.	Release date	ISBN
5	12 February 2016	9791157401307
Chapter .15-2: God's Lover (God's lover); A.E.; Chapter .16: A.E.

Volume 5 has been published on 12 February 2016, it's until Chapter 1 Ep. 16 - A.E. (1-4) - #322.

No.	Release date	ISBN
6	3 November 2016	9791157401406
Chapter II .01-1 A Catnap (a catnap)

Volume 6 has been published on 3 November 2016, it's until Chapter 2 Ep. 1 - A Catnap (110) - #432.

No.	Release date	ISBN
7	20 March 2017	9791157401413
Chapter II .01-2 A Catnap (a catnap); A.E.
8	20 March 2017	9791157401420
A.E.; Chapter II .02-1 Kuan's Fridge (콴의 냉장고; Kwanui Naengjanggo)

Volume 7 and 8 has been published on 20 March 2017. Volume 7 is until Chapter 2 Ep. 2 - A.E. (12) - #519. Volume 8 is until Chapter 2 Ep. 2 - Kuan's Fridge (77) - #608.

No.	Release date	ISBN
9	30 April 2019	9791157403257
Chapter II .02-2 Kuan's Fridge (콴의 냉장고; Kwanui Naengjanggo)

Volume 9 has been published on 30 April 2019, it's until Chapter 2 Ep. 2 - Kuan's Fridge (178) - #709.

No.	Release date	ISBN
10	30 May 2019	9791157403264
Chapter II .02-3 Kuan's Fridge (콴의 냉장고; Kwanui Naengjanggo); A.E.

Volume 10 has been published on 30 May 2019.

No.	Release date	ISBN
11	26 July 2019	9791157403257
Chapter II. 02-4: Kuan's Fridge (콴의 냉장고; Kwanui Naengjanggo); Chapter II. 03-1: The knight
12	26 July 2019	9791157403288
Chapter II. 03-2: The knight
13	26 July 2019	9791157403295
Chapter II. 03-3: The knight

On 25 June 2018, Neocartoon says, Chapter 2 of the Part 2 of set will be composed of Volume 9 – 13.

No.	Release date	ISBN
14	28 May 2020	9791157403318
Chapter III. 01-1: Dike (다이크; Daikeu)
15	28 May 2020	9791157403325
Chapter III. 01-2: Dike (다이크; Daikeu)
16	28 May 2020	9791157403332
Chapter III. 01-3: Dike (다이크; Daikeu)
17	28 May 2020	9791157403349
Chapter III. 01-4: Dike (다이크; Daikeu)
18	28 May 2020	9791157403356
Chapter III. 01-5: Dike (다이크; Daikeu)
19	28 May 2020	9791157403363
Chapter III. 02: Epilogue (에필로그; Epillogeu)

Volume 14 – 19 has been published on 28 May 2020.

No.	Title	Release date	ISBN
	Denma S.E. Rami Record	25 July 2017	9791157401437

Physical Error Occurrence Report: Denma Episode 1
- Author: Dcdc
- Cover artist: 현실안주형
- Language: Korean
- Series: Denma Another Episode
- Release number: 1
- Subject: Lie, Assassin, God, Love, Quanx
- Genre: Fantasy, SF
- Publisher: Jamobooks
- Publication date: 20 August 2019
- Publication place: South Korea
- Pages: 268
- ISBN: 9788954439954
- Website: Link

Those Who Harvest Stars: Denma Episode 2
- Author: Dcdc
- Cover artist: 현실안주형
- Language: Korean
- Series: Denma Another Episode
- Release number: 2
- Subject: Lie, Assassin, God, Love, Quanx
- Genre: Fantasy, SF
- Publisher: Jamobooks
- Publication date: 20 August 2019
- Publication place: South Korea
- Pages: 276
- ISBN: 9788954439961
- Website: Link

The Sanctuary of the Planet Gaia: Denma Episode 3
- Author: Dcdc
- Cover artist: 현실안주형
- Language: Korean
- Series: Denma Another Episode
- Release number: 3
- Subject: Lie, Assassin, God, Love, Quanx
- Genre: Fantasy, SF
- Publisher: Jamobooks
- Publication date: 20 August 2019
- Publication place: South Korea
- Pages: 224
- ISBN: 9788954439978
- Website: Link

And 《Rami Record》 has been published on 25 July 2017, it's until Chapter 2 S.E. Rami Record (4) - #511.

=== Mobile games ===
In September 2015, 5 characters from Denma were added as player characters in South Korean company Dryad's 2015 mobile game Yo! Villains. The villains (characters) of Denma, Dike, Jet, Edel, God were released. Cell was released by NPC. Lot (롯; Rot) was released on 11 December 2015. Gosan, Balak, Nell were released on 15 January 2016. The service was terminated on 5 April 2017.

South Korean mobile game company New.f.o produced a mobile video game adaption of Denma with NAVER WEBTOON, launched on Google Play on 26 October 2016. The characters of Denma, Hardok, Max (dog), Cell, Savoy (Boyle's junior), Gaal, Uriel, Jet, Adam, Crying Daddy, Dike, Guyrin, Hades, Hoon, Randolph, Bon, Max, Andante (안단테; Andante) (game's original character), Rami, Gatsu, Abigail, Mirai, Bala(c)k, Tear, Lot, Dark Lord Lot (마왕 롯; Mawang Rot) (hyper, game's original shape), Gaya, Haggler, Gongja, Nell, Daniel, Hellman Sharp (헬맨 샵; Helmaen Syap) (hyper), Edel, Min-G, Director Bala(c)k (hyper), Haaken (game's original shape), Honma (game's original shape, clothes he wears), Assassin Haaken (암살자 하아켄; Amsalja Haaken) (hyper, game's original shape, clothes he wears) are released. Jiro is 11, Ayn (Since his clothes is a spoiler, it's replaced by the first appearance) is 17, and Purgee Jiro (추방자 지로; Chubangja Jiro) (hyper) is released on 25 November 2016. God is 1, Federick is 9, Giyeok (기역; Giyeok) is 21, Agnes (hyper) is released on 29 December 2016. Rieul (리을; Rieul) is 5, Naomi is 12, Gauss (가우스; Gauseu) is 19, Hador is released on 25 January 2017. Yahwah (hyper, game's original weapon) is 1, Edrei is 16, Guardian priest Edel (hyper) is released on 28 February. Aaron is 16, Count El (hyper) is released on 30 March. Gyu-oh is 13, Dike the Invincible Death (hyper, game's original shape) is released on 27 April. The clothes that the characters linked here are wearing the default skins of the characters. It may not be the first ch. (chapter) in which the linked character appears. There may be characters that haven't yet appeared in the English version. The service is terminated on 31 July 2019.

In January 2018, Since Times signed an intellectual property contract. Since Times will use this to show casual RPG. Later, it is revealed in July of the same year that a mobile strategy card RPG Densinma with NAVER WEBTOON (덴신마 with NAVER WEBTOON; Densinma with NAVER WEBTOON) will be released. This is a game with 3 webtoons. One is Sindorim (신도림; Sindorim) and the other is I'm a Middle Schooler Becoming the Demon Lord (마왕이 되는 중2야; Mawangi doeneun jungiya). On 19 February 2019, the game company releases its brand page and begins to make advance reservations. It's launched on Google Play on 2 April 2019. The characters of Dike, Gongja, Lot, Abigail, Dr. God (갓 고드; Gat Godeu), Yahwah, Ran, Hades, Bala(c)k, Gatsu, Eunguy, Transcriptome Adam (전사체 아담; Jeonsache Adam), Edel, Jet, Denma, Gaal, Arcel, Cat God (고드 캣; Godeu kaet) are released. Duke Gosan is released on 15 May. It may not be the first ch. (chapter) in which the linked character appears. There may be characters that haven't yet appeared in the English version. The service will be terminated on 31 October 2019.

=== Music ===
On 30 September 2015, South Korean singer-songwriter Baram Kim (Kim baram) released a song 「I Need to Go Home Now」 (집에 가야만 해; Jib-e gayaman hae) from Chapter 1 Ep. 15 - God's Lover (73) - #268 on YouTube. On 13 November 2017, he released the song on Musician League of Naver Music.

On 23 July 2017, South Korean singer-songwriter and guitarist Peri Kim (Kim peri) released an inspired piece of 「Space Cat」 from God's Lover. The lyrics were written at the Dr. God's viewpoint. On 30 August and 2 September, he released a room version and a video, which he directly sang the song, on Musician League of Naver Music.

=== Web fiction ===
The web fiction series have been serialized. It's authored by Dcdc. The first volume, The Puppet Show was serialized on 1 April 2017. The second volume, The Idolatry was serialized on 30 June. The third volume, The Love Sick is serializing on 8 December. But it was interrupted on 11 January ~ 2 February 2018. The novel volumes will be published in April. This is completed on 4 March 2018.

Jacobo is the main character of The Puppet Show. Gaya and Daniel are the main character of The Idolatry. The Planar Constraint Quanx is the main character and an Equivalent Mass Substitution Quanx, a Taija race telepath Quanx, a middle-aged woman, a drug addict Teleporting Quanx is the characters of The Love Sick.

Eventually, their episodes will be published as 'Another Episode (A.E.)' each on 20 August 2019. Part 1, <The Puppet Show> is renamed to 'Physical Error Occurrence Report: Denma Episode 1'. Part 2, <The Idolatry> is renamed to 'Those Who Harvest Stars: Denma Episode 2'. Part 3, <The Love Sick> is renamed to 'The Sanctuary of the Planet Gaia: Denma Episode 3'.

The episode "Physical Error Occurrence Report: Denma Episode 1" is an exciting story based on the "Marionette" episode, featuring the early episode of webtoon "Denma". The main character, 'I (Jacobo)' is a Marionette Quanx and assassin. The assassination using this ability is neat. If you control and kill the object, it is enough. Even if the kind of person who reads the memory examines the murder scene, the evidence can't be found. The users can disguise themselves as suicide or an accident. And one day, Dudan's wife, Madina, comes to 'I'. Dudan is a powerful boss of this planet's gangland. And she asked 'I' to kill his husband. 'I' is embarrassed and he doesn't know what to do, but he reject it because it is impossible. There is a person who come to the office of 'I' afterwards, and he is Dudan. Dudan ask 'I' to perform her request to kill himself.

The episode "Those Who Harvest the Stars: Denma Episode 2" was intended to contain a mood similar to the political drama of the Gosan family and El family in the galaxy-scale of Denma's middle story. Through this political drama, writer Dcdc deals with Quanxs' solidarity and the disintegration behind it. The main character is Caesar, the leader of the planetary synagogue blank group, and his pupils who are Gaya and Daniel. Caesar is a symbolic person who has earned the pioneer status of the U.C.S. as a representative of the planet Synagogue, a transitional resident planet, gathering Quanxs who have no place to go. But the planet is faced with a number of crises, such as insufficient housing space, refugee management problems, and tax pressure. Gaya thinks a new idea as she struggles to come up with countermeasures. It is the plan to attend the inter-planetary talks and propose investment attraction. And the talks are held in Kuan's Fridge!

"The Sanctuary of the Planet Gaia: Episode 3 of Denma" is an episode that Dcdc has recently released the atmosphere of "Denma" which has succeeded not only in the alienation of space but also in the description of the individual characters involved in the incident. The background of this episode is planet Gaia. Gaia is a planet Quanx which is rarely observed in the universe eight. That planet is supposed to be a divine being with enormous power, but the details are strict. On the surface, that planet is denominated as a religious group, but in reality it is a place where terrible secret experiments are conducted under the control of a cult, 'Church of Madonna'. And there were characters going in there to infiltrate, the characters of the five main characters are humorous. The mission has begun! The delightful five people are ordered by the elder, to steal the 'seed of God' to Gaia.

=== Model figures ===
Team Imitatros (WindMill) makes the model figures. The model figures of Directors of Silverquick's station 7, Beer-Lahai-Ros Imitatros, Experimental animal were released. The model figures of Lot, Federick, Haggler, Gosan's cousin, Duke of Gosan were released. They're released on 6 March 2017.

The model figures of Denma, Quai, Cell, Cell's Avatar were released by GNFTOY on 27 November 2015. These products can't be purchased in 2018.

The model figures of Lot, Gongja were released by GNFTOY on 15 September 2017. Then the model figures of Jiro (Spoiler), Gaya, Tiptoe were released on 2 February 2018. In the same year, Gongja dress version, Tiptoe was released by GNFTOY on 4 September. The design has been made by Team Imitatros (WindMill), which is mentioned above. In 2019, Edel was also released on 1 February. These products can't be purchased.
