= Mrtve Mačke =

Bosnian punk band from Sarajevo, Bosnia and Herzegovina

Mrtve mačke
- Origin: Sarajevo, Bosnia and Herzegovina
- Genre: Punk rock
- Years active: 2010–2014
- Past members: Merjema Karavdić; Nermana Ferhatbegović; Selma Spahić; Irma Jakić

Mrtve mačke (English: Dead Cats) was a Bosnian punk band from Sarajevo, Bosnia and Herzegovina. Active during the early 2010s, they were notable for being an all-female punk rock band within the Sarajevo underground music scene, although the members themselves rejected the "female punk band" label, preferring to be simply recognized as a punk band.

== History ==
The band was formed while the members were in high school, initially consisting of five friends who spent significant time together at local gigs and sleepovers. The lineup included vocalist Merjema Karavdić, drummer Irma Jakić, and Nermana Ferhatbegović and Selma Spahić, who both alternated between playing guitar and bass, along with a fifth member, Hana, who left the band early on.

The inspiration to form the band came after the teenagers watched the biographical film The Runaways. Motivated by the depiction of a teenage all-female punk band, they decided to pursue their own musical aspirations, despite having no prior musical training. They secured practice space at a local youth center and began learning to play by covering songs they liked. With assistance from friends in other local bands, they successfully learned their first two covers: the Ramones' "Blitzkrieg Bop" and the Misfits' "Skulls".

As they progressed, Mrtve mačke began writing original material. While songwriting was a collaborative effort, bassist/guitarist Selma Spahić became the primary composer, with the band finalizing the arrangements together during rehearsals. Their original repertoire included songs such as "Sotonistički party kod Fuzde", "Tloka", "Dosada", and "Anti-Fast Food".

Mrtve mačke primarily performed at local underground club events and independent festivals in Bosnia and Herzegovina. Their live debut took place at the youth center where they rehearsed, performing their two covers along with an original song written for them by a friend and another new cover. Early in their live career, they also performed as the opening act for the Serbian punk rock band Lude krawe. On 8 September 2012, the band performed at the 3rd Antifa Fest in Mostar.

A month later, they were featured in the lineup for the inaugural Sarajevo Punk Fest, a week-long festival aimed at popularizing urban music genres and alternative youth culture in the capital. The band performed on the third night of the festival, 10 October 2012, at the "Underground" club in Sarajevo. They shared the stage with the well-known Croatian punk band Gužva u 16-ercu, as well as local Bosnian acts Nema Teorije and S.P.U.K.

Local music critics praised their energetic stage presence, describing their style as a cross between the Ramones and the Runaways. During their Sarajevo Punk Fest set, they performed covers such as the Ramones' "Judy Is a Punk" and the Misfits' "I Turned into a Martian". One notable moment from the performance involved the bassist and guitarist swapping instruments mid-set to continue playing, reflecting their shared instrumental roles within the band.

Following their brief period of live activity, the band quietly disbanded as its members moved on to pursue higher education, with at least two members later studying medicine at the University of Sarajevo. The band's founder and drummer, Irma Jakić, eventually shifted her focus from the arts to information technology, relocating abroad to work as a software engineer.

== Members ==
- Merjema Karavdić – vocals
- Nermana Ferhatbegović – guitar, bass
- Selma Spahić – bass, guitar
- Irma Jakić – drums
- Hana – unknown (early member)
