= Tzuyu =

Taiwanese singer (born 1999)

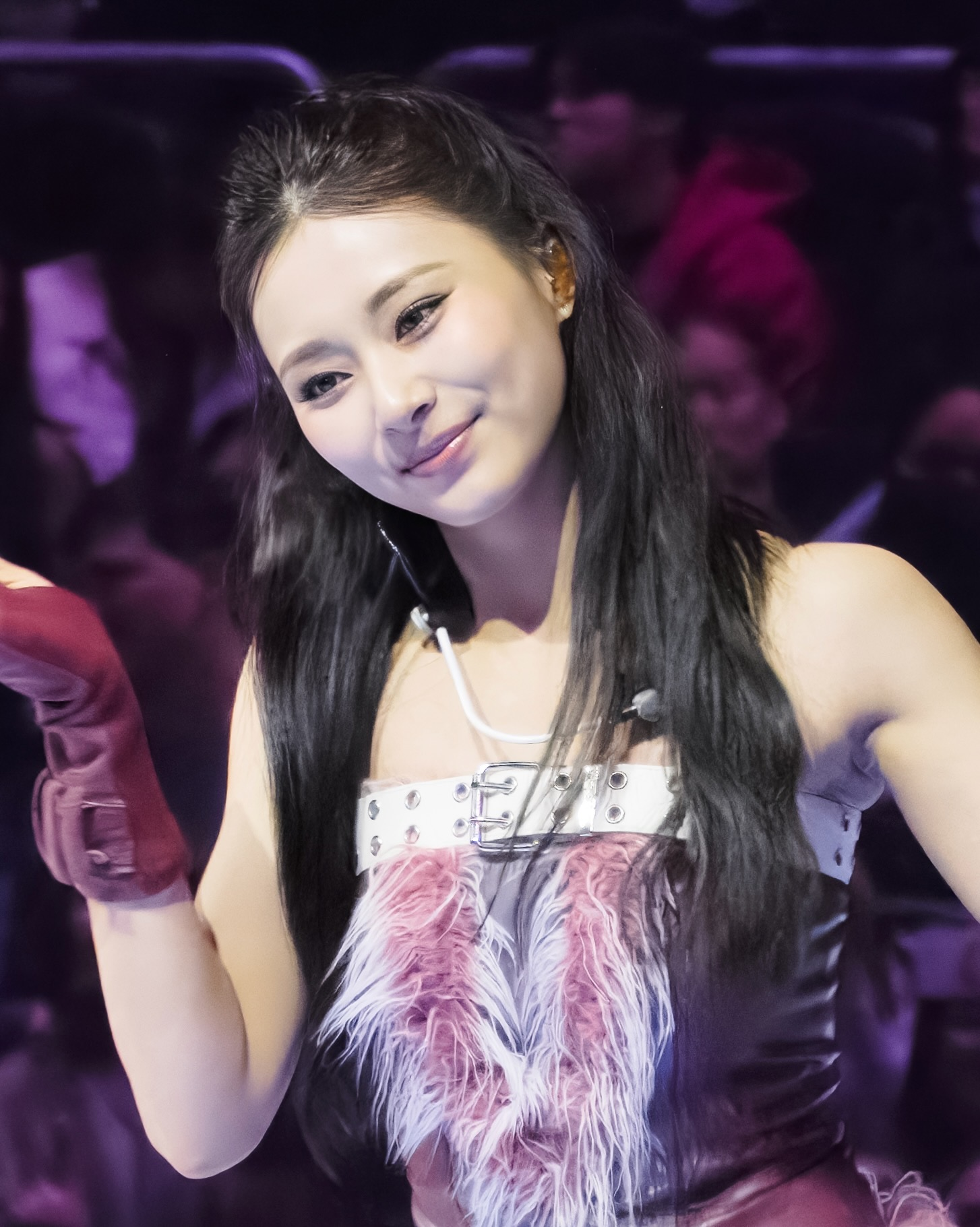
- Tzuyu performing in 2026
- Born: Chou Tzu-yu; June 14, 1999 (age 27); Tainan, Taiwan
- Education: Miguel de Cervantes European University
- Occupation: Singer
- Musical career
- Origin: South Korea
- Genres: K-pop; J-pop
- Instrument: Vocals
- Years active: 2015–present
- Labels: JYP; Warner Japan; Republic
- Member of: Twice

Tzuyu
- Chinese: 周子瑜
- Wade–Giles: Chou^{1} Tzŭ^{3}-yü^{2}
- Hanyu Pinyin: Zhōu Zǐyú
Transcriptions
Standard Mandarin
- Hanyu Pinyin: Zhōu Zǐyú
- Bopomofo: ㄓㄡ ㄗˇ ㄩˊ
- Wade–Giles: Chou^{1} Tzŭ^{3}-yü^{2}
Southern Min
- Hokkien POJ: Chiu Chú-jû

Chou Tzu-yu (Chinese: 周子瑜; born June 14, 1999), known mononymously as Tzuyu (Korean: 쯔위, Korean pronunciation: [t͈ɕɯ.y]), is a Taiwanese singer based in South Korea. She is a member of the South Korean girl group Twice, formed by JYP Entertainment in 2015.

Tzuyu released her debut extended play (EP), Aboutzu, on September 6, 2024. Its lead single, "Run Away", became her first number-one single on the Billboard Taiwan Songs chart.

== Life and career ==
=== Early life and pre-debut activities ===
Tzuyu was born on June 14, 1999, in the East District of Tainan, Taiwan. She started dancing from a young age and trained at a dance academy.

In 2012, Tzuyu was discovered by talent scouts at the Muse Performing Arts Workshop in Tainan, and moved to South Korea in November of that year to begin training. In 2015, Tzuyu participated in the South Korean reality television show Sixteen, created by JYP Entertainment and co-produced by Mnet. As one of nine successful participants, she went on to join the newly formed girl group Twice.

=== 2015–present: Twice and solo debut ===
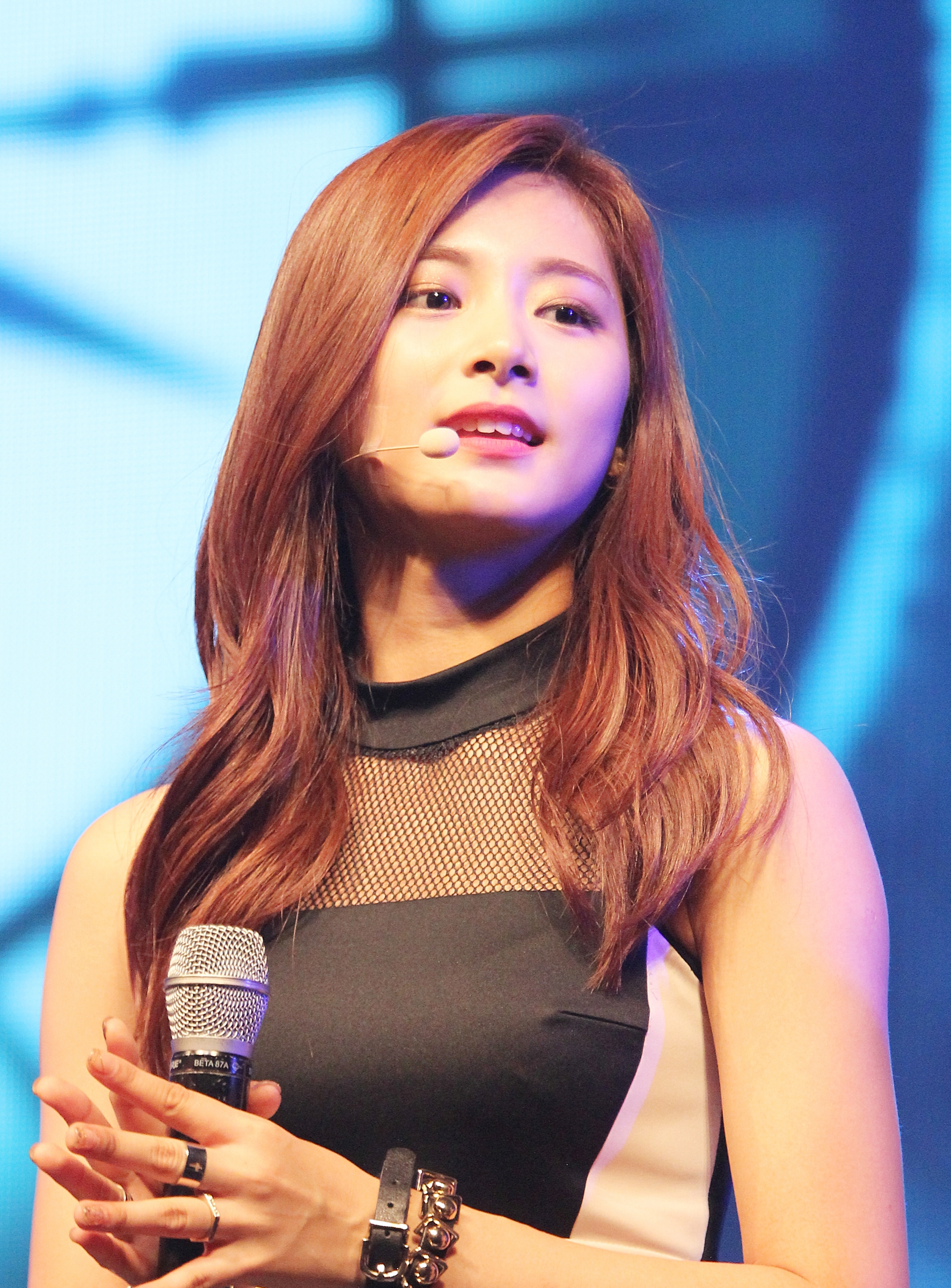
Tzuyu in 2015

In October 2015, Tzuyu officially debuted as a member of Twice with the release of their first extended play, The Story Begins. Its lead single "Like Ooh-Ahh" was the first K-pop debut song to reach 100 million views on YouTube. Since then, she has worked as a presenter on multiple South Korean music television shows. As a soloist, Tzuyu released covers of "Me!" by Taylor Swift and "Christmas Without You" by Ava Max as part of the Melody Project series.

On August 2, 2024, JYP Entertainment announced that Tzuyu would be making her solo debut with the release of her debut extended play, Aboutzu, on September 6. The EP has six tracks, including lead single "Run Away" and collaborations with Peniel of BtoB and rapper pH-1. On September 26, 2025, Tzuyu released the collaboration single "Blink" with Corbyn Besson, along with an accompanying music video. On July 3, 2026, Tzuyu performed at the Kaohsiung Beer Rock Festival.

== Other ventures ==
=== Endorsements ===
Tzuyu has featured alone in various advertisements, including those for LG U+ and Crocs Korea. She covered the October 2021 issue of L'Officiel Malaysia as a model for the Coach Fall/Winter 2021 collection. In January 2022, Tzuyu was chosen as the new muse of South Korean clothing brand Zooc. In October 2022, she was announced as the muse of the Japanese cosmetics brand Visée. In October 2023, she was appointed as the global ambassador for the Pond's Skin Institute's Brand Evolution Campaign. In September 2025, Tzuyu and bandmate Jihyo were announced as brand ambassadors for Ponds Philippines. In March 2026, Tzuyu officially became the brand ambassador for 7-Eleven Taiwan, Making her first major retail endorsement in her home country. In November 2026, she became the regional brand ambassador for the Japanese eyewear brand OWNDAYS.

=== Philanthropy ===
On February 29, 2020, Tzuyu donated ₩50 million (equivalent to ₩58.3 million or US$43,500.37 in 2025) to the South Korean Community Chest, for helping prevent the spread of COVID-19.

== Public image and influence ==
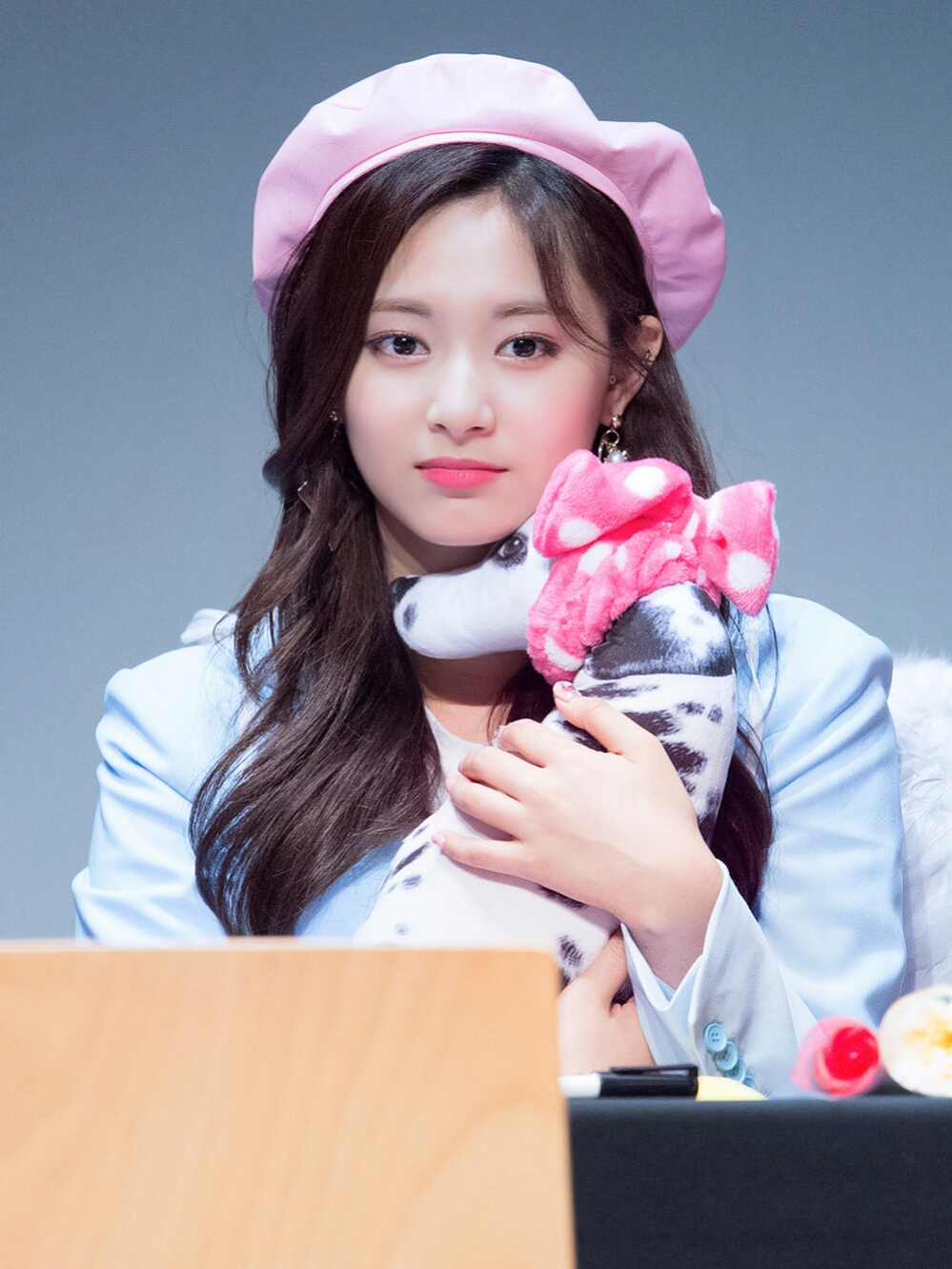
Tzuyu in 2018

=== Public image ===
Tzuyu has received widespread attention for her beauty since her debut with Twice, and was nicknamed "Light of Taiwan" (Note: (Chinese: 台灣之光) The light of Taiwan is a term commonly used by Taiwanese news media to refer to internationally famous Taiwanese, people of Taiwanese descent, or Taiwanese products. It is also a term used by Taiwanese to be proud of their local culture.) by the Taiwanese media due to her popularity. After performing at the Victoria's Secret Fashion Show 2025, the bra that Tzuyu wore was reportedly sold out within a few days. According to Em Enriquez of the Filipino fashion magazine Preview, Tzuyu "singlehandedly" drove sales for the item, which has since earned the moniker of "the Tzuyu bra".

=== Influence ===
After the flag controversy in 2016, Tzuyu was credited with increasing Taiwanese votes by up to 1-2% in favor of President Tsai Ing-wen. According to Gallup Korea's annual music survey, Tzuyu was the third most popular idol among South Koreans in 2016. She ranked ninth in the 2017 survey and twelfth in 2018. In 2019, Tzuyu was ranked as the second most popular female K-pop idol in a survey of soldiers completing mandatory military service in South Korea. In 2023, Tzuyu surpassed Jay Chou and became the most followed Taiwanese celebrity on Instagram with over 10 million followers.

== Personal life ==
In 2016, she passed an exam at Tainan Municipal Fusing Junior High School to certify her middle school education. She attended high school at Hanlim Multi Art School in South Korea, and graduated in February 2019 along with bandmate Chaeyoung.

In 2024, Tzuyu announced that she had completed a master's degree in applied psychology from Miguel de Cervantes European University in Spain. She explained that she pursued the degree online for over a year, as Twice's group activities had slowed down during the COVID-19 pandemic.

=== Flag controversy ===
In November 2015, Tzuyu appeared with bandmates Sana, Momo, and Mina on the Korean variety show My Little Television. She introduced herself as Taiwanese and held the flag of the Republic of China (Taiwan) alongside that of South Korea. Mainland Chinese internet users reacted angrily towards Tzuyu's actions due to the political rift between the two countries. Soon after, Twice was barred from Chinese television and Tzuyu was pulled out of her endorsement with Chinese communications company Huawei. Meanwhile, her agency, JYP Entertainment, released a video showing Tzuyu reading an apology, which sparked a furor among the Taiwanese public on election day. The incident gained international attention, as it was believed to have affected the 2016 Taiwanese general election.

== Discography ==
=== Extended plays ===
List of extended plays, showing selected details, selected chart positions, and sales figures
Title	Details	Peak chart positions					Sales	Certifications
Title	Details	KOR	JPN	JPN Comb	US	US World	Sales	Certifications
Aboutzu	Released: September 6, 2024; Label: JYP, Republic; Formats: CD, LP, digital download, streaming	3	3	4	19	1	KOR: 398,294; JPN: 20,641; US: 22,000	KMCA: Platinum

=== Singles ===
List of singles, showing year released, selected chart positions, and name of the album
Title	Year	Peak chart positions						Album
Title	Year	KOR DL	NZ Hot	SGP Reg.	TWN	US Pop	US World	Album
"Run Away"	2024	22	40	29	1	—	6	Aboutzu
"Blink" (with Corbyn Besson)	2025	—	—	—	7	31	—	Head First
"—" denotes a recording that did not chart or was not released in that territory.

=== Other charted songs ===
List of other charted songs, showing year released, selected chart positions, and name of the album
Title	Year	Peak chart positions	Album
Title	Year	KOR DL	Album
"Heartbreak In Heaven" (featuring Peniel of BtoB)	2024	94	Aboutzu
"Lazy Baby" (featuring pH-1)	2024	90	Aboutzu
"Losing Sleep"	2024	100	Aboutzu
"One Love"	2024	98	Aboutzu
"Fly"	2024	95	Aboutzu
"Dive In" (Note: credited to Twice, but the track is a solo by Tzuyu)	2025	195	Ten: The Story Goes On

=== Guest appearances ===
List of non-single guest appearances, showing year released, and name of the album
Title	Year	Album
"Daring Woman" (당돌한 여자) (with Jihyo, Nayeon and Chaeyoung)	2015	Two Yoo Project – Sugar Man Pt. 11

=== Songwriting credits ===
All song credits are adapted from the Korea Music Copyright Association's database unless stated otherwise.

List of songs, showing year released, artist name, and name of the album
Title	Year	Artist	Album	Notes
"21:29"	2019	Twice	Feel Special	As lyricist
"Celebrate"	2022	Twice	Celebrate	As lyricist
"Fly"	2024	Tzuyu	Aboutzu	As lyricist
"Blink"	2025	Corbyn Besson & Tzuyu	Head First	As lyricist and composer
"Me+You"	2025	Twice	Ten: The Story Goes On	As lyricist

== Videography ==
=== Music videos ===
List of music videos, showing year released, and name of the director(s)
Title	Year	Director(s)	Ref.
"Run Away"	2024	Yang Soon-Shik (YSS Studio)	
"Blink"	2025	Martin Myaka	

== Filmography ==
=== Television shows ===
Year	Title	Role	Note	Ref.
2015	Sixteen	Contestant	A survival show designed to select the members of Twice	

== Awards and nominations ==
Name of the award ceremony, year presented, category, nominee of the award, and the result of the nomination
Award ceremony	Year	Category	Nominee / Work	Result	Ref.
iHeartRadio Music Awards	2026	Favorite K-pop Collab	"Blink" (with Corbyn Besson)	Nominated	
