= Runway (disambiguation) =

A runway is a strip of land at an airport on which aircraft can take off and land.

Runway may also refer to:

- Runway (fashion), (US), a narrow, usually elevated platform that runs into an auditorium, used by models

== Film and television ==
- Runway (2004 film), an Indian Malayalam-language crime drama
- Runway (2009 film), an Indian Hindi action film
- Runway (2010 film), a Bangladeshi film directed by Tareque Masud
- Runway, a 2020 Japanese film
- The Runway, a 2010 film based on a 1983 incident in Mallow, County Cork, Ireland
- Runway (game show), a 1987–1993 UK daytime quiz programme

== Music ==
- Runway (album), by AOA, 2016
- "Runway" (song), by Lady Gaga and Doechii, 2026
- "Runway", a song by Duke Dumont, 2018
- "Rnw@y", a song by Linkin Park from Reanimation, 2002
- "Runway", a song by Mariah Carey from Caution, 2018
- "Runway", a song by MiSaMo from Haute Couture, 2024
- "The Runway", a song by the Grass Roots from Move Along, 1972

== Other uses ==
- Runway (company), an American AI research company
- Runway, a fictional fashion magazine in the novel The Devil Wears Prada and the adapted film
- Runway bus, in computer circuitry, a front side bus developed by HP

== See also ==
- Project Runway, an American reality television series
- Roll way, in a rubber-tyred metro
- Runaway (disambiguation)
