= Aboutzu =

2024 extended play by Tzuyu

- Digital cover

EP by Tzuyu
- Released: September 6, 2024
- Recorded: 2024
- Studio: JYP Studios
- Genre: Dance-pop
- Length: 19:08
- Languages: Korean; English
- Labels: JYP; Republic

Singles from Aboutzu
- 1. "Run Away" Released: September 6, 2024

Aboutzu (stylized as abouTZU) is the debut extended play (EP) by Taiwanese singer Tzuyu of the girl group Twice. It was released on September 6, 2024, through JYP Entertainment and Republic Records. The EP contains six tracks, including the lead single "Run Away" and collaborations with Peniel of BtoB and rapper pH-1.

== Background ==
In 2023, the decision was made that Tzuyu would debut as a soloist, with recording and production beginning in February 2024. On August 2, 2024, JYP Entertainment released an opening trailer for Aboutzu to publicly announce Tzuyu's solo debut. Throughout August and early September, various teasers and other promotional content were distributed in anticipation of the EP's release on September 6. The official music video for the lead single "Run Away" came out on the same day as the EP. In an interview with Rolling Stone, also published on September 6, Tzuyu explained that she has long had the desire to release her own album and that she hopes listeners will learn more about her true personality through her music. Tzuyu was the third member of Twice to launch a solo music career, following Nayeon in 2022 and Jihyo in 2023.

== Title ==
The title Aboutzu is a combination of the English word "about" and the first three letters of the singer's name Tzuyu, symbolizing that the EP reflects all aspects of herself. The text "abouTZU" on the EP's cover art can also be read as "chouTZU" to represent her full name Chou Tzuyu.

== Composition ==
The lead single "Run Away" is a synth-pop and disco-pop song composed by Andrea Rosario, Elsa Curran, Davin Kingston, and Johnny Simpson, with lyrics written by Park Jin-young. Pyo Kyung-min of The Korea Times, reporting from a pre-release press conference, said that the song "features nostalgia-evoking piano melodies in the intro and a bold synth bass for the chorus, evoking a sound reminiscent of the late 2000s to mid-2010s". Next on the track list are collaborations with Peniel of BtoB in "Heartbreak in Heaven" and rapper pH-1 in "Lazy Baby", before the EP continues with the solo tracks "Losing Sleep" and "One Love". Tzuyu wrote the lyrics for the final song "Fly", a ballad that tells her own story.

== Reception ==
Professional ratings
Review scores
Source	Rating
AllMusic	3/5 stars

Neil Z. Yeung of AllMusic awarded the album three out of five stars, writing that the album was "covering the scope of typical K-pop albums" and praising "Run Away" as "carefree dance-pop perfection".

== Commercial performance ==
Pre-order sales of Aboutzu reportedly reached 467,500 copies worldwide. In South Korea, the EP debuted at number 3 on the Circle Album Chart for the week ending September 7, with 284,844 copies sold. In the United States, the EP debuted at number 19 on the Billboard 200 for the chart dated September 21, with 24,000 album-equivalent units, including 22,000 physical album sales as reported by the music data tracking firm Luminate.

== Track listing ==
Aboutzu track listing
No.	Title	Lyrics	Music	Arrangement	Length
1.	"Run Away"	J.Y. Park "The Asiansoul"	Andrea Rosario; Elsa Curran; Davin Kingston; Johnny Simpson	Kingston; Simpson	3:18
2.	"Heartbreak in Heaven" (featuring Peniel of BtoB)	Tom Mann; Nicole Blair; Alex Stacey; Peter Rycroft; Peniel	Mann; Blair; Stacey; Rycroft; Peniel	Lostboy	3:33
3.	"Lazy Baby" (featuring pH-1)	Lee Yi-jin; pH-1	Bobbi LaNea Taylor; Folayan Omi Kunerede; Mark Gozman; Shayon Daniels; Nicci Funicelli; pH-1	Marky Style; Daniels; Funicelli	2:42
4.	"Losing Sleep"	Moon Yeo-reum (Jam Factory)	Jonny Hockings; Maria Hazell; Tre Jean-Marie	Jean-Marie	2:39
5.	"One Love"	Lee Seu-ran	Kamille; Rick Parkhouse; George Tizzard	Red Triangle	3:13
6.	"Fly"	Tzuyu	Daniel Durn; Katrine Neya Klith; Kim Woo-sang; pdly	pdly; Kim; Durn; Klith	3:43
Total length:					19:08

== Personnel ==
Credits adapted from album liner notes.

Musicians

- Tzuyu – lead vocals
- Sophia Pae – background vocals
- Johnny Simpson – piano, keyboard, programming (track 1)
- Davin Kingston – piano, keyboard (track 1)
- Peniel – featured vocals (track 2)
- Lostboy – keyboards, programming, guitars, bass, drums (track 2)
- Marky Style – instrumentation (track 3)
- Shayon Daniels – instrumentation (track 3)
- Nicci Funicelli – instrumentation (track 3)
- pH-1 – featured vocals, background vocals (track 3)
- Tre Jean-Marie – drums, bass, programming, synthesizer (track 4)
- George Tizzard – guitar, drums, keyboard (track 5)
- Rick Parkhouse – bass, programming, piano (track 5)
- pdly – programming (track 6)
- Kim Woo-sang – programming, piano (track 6)
- Shiry – guitar (track 6)

Technical

- Sophia Pae – vocal directing for Tzuyu
- Lee Kyung-won – digital editing (track 1)
- Seo Eun-il – recording (track 1)
- Im Chan-mi – recording (track 1)
- Lee Tae-seop – mixing (track 1)
- Kwon Nam-woo – mastering
- Shin Bong-won – Dolby Atmos mixing
- Park Nam-joon – digital editing (tracks 4–6), Dolby Atmos mixing assistance
- Lee Seon-yu – vocal directing for Peniel (track 2)
- Gu Hye-jin – digital editing (track 2), recording for Tzuyu (tracks 2, 4–5)
- Kim Dong-il – recording for Peniel (track 2)
- Park Eun-jeong – mixing (track 2)
- Im Chan-mi – recording (tracks 1, 4, 6)
- Lee Sang-yeop – digital editing, recording for Tzuyu (tracks 3, 5)
- pH-1 – recording for pH-1 (track 3)
- Choi Hye-jin – mixing (track 3)
- Eom Se-hee – mixing (track 4)
- Im Hong-jin – mixing (tracks 5–6)

== Charts ==
=== Weekly charts ===
Weekly chart performance for Aboutzu
Chart (2024)	Peak position
Hungarian Physical Albums (MAHASZ)	23
Japanese Albums (Oricon)	3
Japanese Combined Albums (Oricon)	4
Japanese Hot Albums (Billboard Japan)	45
South Korean Albums (Circle)	3
UK Album Downloads (Official Charts)	18
UK Albums Sales (OCC)	56
UK Independent Album Breakers (OCC)	16
US Billboard 200	19
US World Albums (Billboard)	1

=== Monthly charts ===
Monthly chart performance for Aboutzu
Chart (2024)	Peak position
Japanese Albums (Oricon)	18
South Korean Albums (Circle)	4

=== Year-end charts ===
Year-end chart performance for Aboutzu
Chart (2024)	Position
South Korean Albums (Circle)	66

== Certifications ==
Certifications for Aboutzu
Region	Certification	Certified units/sales
South Korea (KMCA)	Platinum	250,000^{^}
^{^} Shipments figures based on certification alone.

== Release history ==
Release history for Aboutzu
Region	Date	Format	Label
Various	September 6, 2024	CD; vinyl LP; digital download; streaming	JYP; Republic
