= The Runaway (short story) =

Short story by Anton Chekhov

- Short story by Anton Chekhov
- 1953 illustration by Anna Davydova
- Original title: Беглец
- Country: Imperial Russia
- Language: Russian

Publication
- Published in: Peterburgskaya Gazeta
- Publisher: Adolf Marks, 1899-1901
- Publication date: 28 September 1887 (old style)

"The Runaway" (Russian: Беглец, romanized: Beglets) is an 1887 short story by Anton Chekhov.

== Background and publication history ==
According to Chekhov's brother Mikhail Chekhov and their sister Maria Chekhova, the story was based on real incidents that Chekhov witnessed when he was working at the Chikino regional hospital as a young doctor. It was first published in the Peterburgskaya Gazeta (28 September 1887), in the section "Fleeting Notes" (Летучие заметки), and was signed A. Chekhonte (А. Чехонте). In a slightly revised version it was reproduced in the illustrated almanac Stoglav in 1889. It was also included in the collection Detvora (Детвора, Children, St Petersburg, 1889). Chekhov then included it in Volume 2 of his Collected Works published by Adolf Marks in 1899–1901. During its author's lifetime, the story was translated into Danish, Serbo-Croatian, German, French and Czech languages. In 1893 Y. Tveroyanskaya, writing from Paris, informed Chekhov that her translations of "Gusev" and "The Runaway" had been published in the Revue des deux Mondes to public and critical acclaim.

== Plot summary ==
Pashka (full name Pavel Galaktionov), a peasant boy of seven who has seen little of the world, has a sore elbow and is taken to a hospital by his mother. The doctor initially seems to Pashka to be grim and frightening, and chides the people around him, including Pashka's mother, who, he says, has been neglecting her son's trouble for so long that the infection has spread into his elbow and he may have to have his arm amputated. The doctor decides that Pashka must stay in the hospital overnight.

The boy finds that the hospital is full of surprises. First he is served a dinner the likes of which he has never seen in his life. Then he discovers a series of strange people in the neighbouring wards. One man, Mikhaylo, lies motionless with a bag of ice on his head. Overwhelmed by his impressions, Pashka dozes off.

The boy is woken by a noise and leaves his bed. He sees three figures in the corridor trying to drag a corpse through a doorway and realises that Mikhaylo has died. Horrified, he rushes out of the hospital in a panic. He runs around in the dark and falls unconscious on the porch When he comes to, it is broad daylight. He is inside the hospital again and the doctor is reproaching him.

== Reception ==
"The Runaway" was one of Lev Tolstoy's favourite stories. "Father greatly enjoyed a little story by Chekhov in the Stoglav almanac and he read it aloud more than once," Tatyana Tolstaya informed her brother Sergey in the 6 February 1889 letter. Later Tolstoy recited it for his guests and family at least twice, in September 1907 and October 1909. "It is such a pleasure to read it. Occasionally, when it is poignant or funny, I get excited," he told his friend, the Slovak doctor Dushan Makovitsky. Tolstoy included the story (along with "The Darling") into his compilation "The Select Reading".
