= Run Away (Tzuyu song) =

Single by Tzuyu

from the EP Aboutzu
- Language: Korean
- Released: September 6, 2024
- Length: 3:18
- Label: JYP
- Composers: Andrea Rosario, Elsa Curran, Davin Kingston, Johnny Simpson
- Lyricist: J.Y. Park "The Asiansoul"

Tzuyu singles chronology
"Run Away" (2024)	"Blink" (2025)

Music video
- "Run Away" on YouTube

Professional ratings
Review scores
Source	Rating
IZM	1.5/5 stars

"Run Away" is a song recorded by Taiwanese singer Tzuyu for her first extended play, Aboutzu. It was released by JYP Entertainment on September 6, 2024.

== Background and release ==
On August 2, JYP Entertainment first announced Tzuyu's solo with an opening trailer and timeline, making her the third member of Twice to make their solo debut, following Nayeon and Jihyo. Between August and early September, Tzuyu then teased her first EP, Aboutzu, with concept photos posted on Twice and JYP Entertainment social media accounts.

== Composition ==
"Run Away" lyrics were written by Park Jin-young, and composed by Johnny Simpson, Andrea Rosario, Elsa Curran and Davin Kingston, "Run Away" is described as a modern reinterpretation of synth pop and dance genres. In terms of musical notation, it was composed in the key of F Major, with a tempo of 130 beats per minute.

The melody was catchy, and the synth bass sound was really captivating, at first, I was worried about whether I could pull it off, but I felt I could offer fans something fresh.

— Tzuyu on first hearing the song

== Promotion ==
To promote "Run Away", Tzuyu subsequently performed on music programs, first performing on KBS's Music Bank on September 6 and then again on September 13. She also performed on MBC's Show! Music Core on September 7 and 14 and SBS's Inkigayo on September 8.

== Reception ==
Kim Tae-hoon of South Korean online music magazine IZM gave the song 1.5 out of five stars, calling the track "filled with questions and inscrutable intentions" and saying that "[Tzuyu] lacks a clear vocalist's signature, nor a clear direction as a musician." The review criticised the "safety-first disco genre" of the track and that "they should have brought out something hidden in her that the public had previously been unaware of or unfamiliar with", and ended the review asking "If this song isn't about showcasing hidden talent or showcasing a trendy style, then what exactly is the purpose of this song?"

== Credits and personnel ==
Credits adapted from Tidal.

Personnel

- Tzuyu – Vocals
- J.Y. Park "The Asiansoul" – Writer
- Andrea Rosario – Composer
- Elsa Curran – Composer
- Davin Kingston – Composer, Producer, Keyboard, Piano
- Johnny Simpson – Composer, Producer, Keyboard, Piano, Programmer
- Sophie Pae – Background Vocals, Vocal Arranger
- Kwon Nam Woo – Mastering Engineer
- Lee Taesub – Mixing Engineer
- Lim Chanmi – Recording Engineer
- Seo Eun il – Recording Engineer
- Kayone – Sound Editor

== Charts ==
=== Weekly charts ===
Weekly chart performance for "Run Away"
Chart (2024)	Peak positions
South Korea Download (Circle)	22
New Zealand Hot Singles (RMNZ)	40
Singapore (RIAS)	29
Taiwan (Billboard)	1
US World Digital Song Sales (Billboard)	6

=== Monthly charts ===
Chart (September 2024)	Peak position
South Korea Download (Circle)	40

== Release history ==
Release history for "Run Away"
Region	Date	Format	Label
Various	September 6, 2024	Digital download; streaming	JYP; Republic
