= Miguel de Cervantes European University =

Spanish private university located in Valladolid, Castilla and León

- Universidad Europea Miguel de Cervantes
- Motto: Sapere Aude
- Type: Private
- Established: 2002
- Rector: David García López
- Location: Valladolid, Castile and León, Spain
- Campus: Urban
- Nickname: UEMC
- Website: http://www.uemc.es

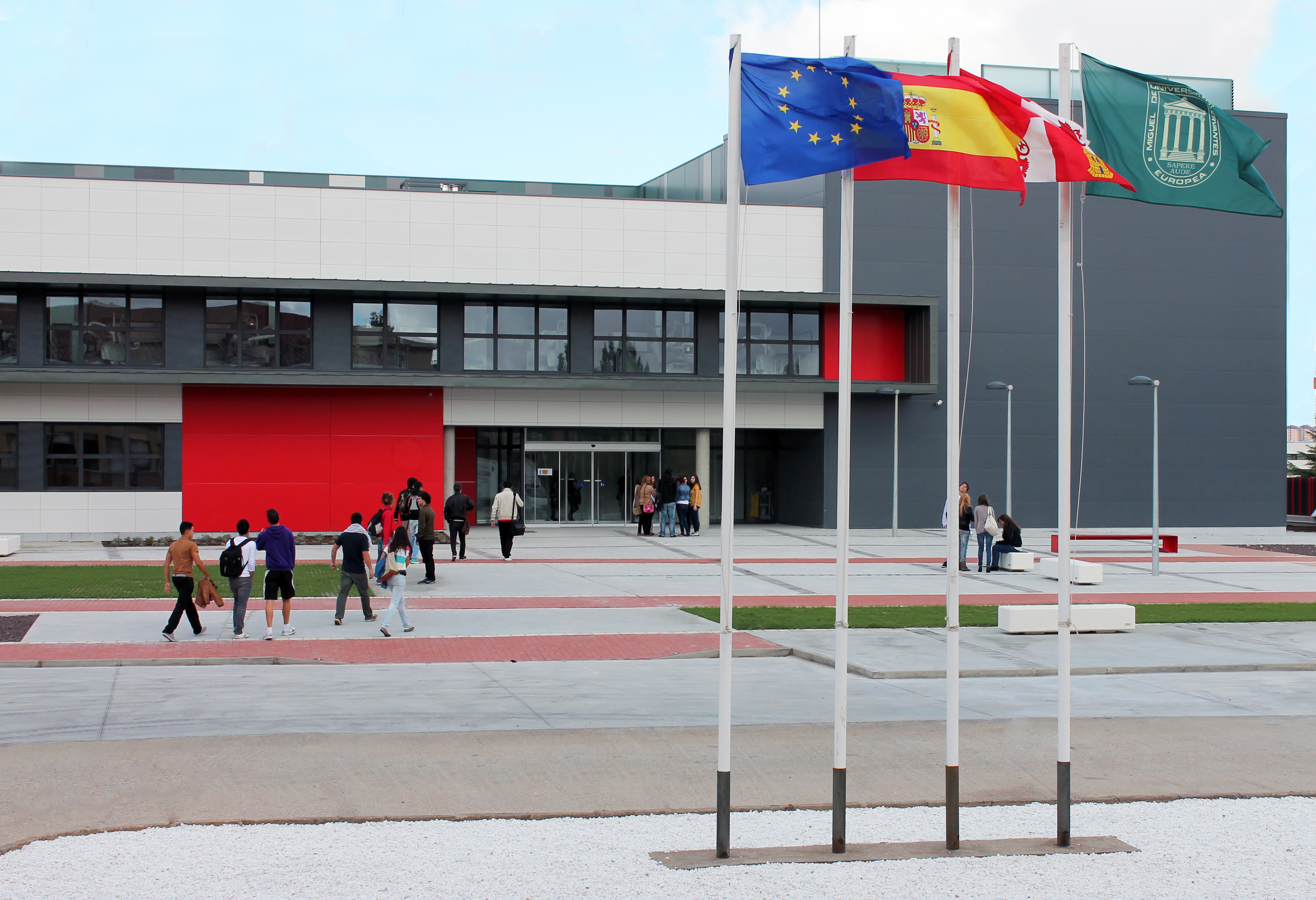
Campus view

Miguel de Cervantes European University (Spanish: Universidad Europea Miguel de Cervantes, UEMC) is a private university located in Valladolid, Castilla y León (Spain). UEMC has 4,500 undergraduate and graduate students enrolled in three Faculties and offers 17 Bachelor's degrees, 6 double degrees, 6 International double degrees, 11 Master's degree and numerous Diplomas.

== History ==
The UEMC was founded in 2002 and almost immediately adopted the European Higher Education Area guidelines. The degrees offered nowadays have been implemented since then. The "International System of Quality Assurance" has been recognized by the National Agency of Quality Assurance and Accreditation (ANECA).

== Emblems ==
The emblems of the institution are described in In Article 6 of its general provisions: The Badge: on conventional Spanish support, with blue background (pantone 315) and double edge, being the lower one yellow (pantone 128). The word UNIVERSITY between the top badge lines in the latter color, as well as the rest of the graphics of the badge. EUROPEAN is written at the bottom also between the lines, and in the center Sapere Aude. MIGUEL DE and a yellow dot are written on the right side, and CERVANTES and yellow dot in the sinister canton. The center or heart is reserved for the schematic representation of the facade of a classical tetrastyle Doric-Tuscan Roman temple, which shows the access stairway. The frieze is dominated by the triglyphs, separated by metopes displaying a plane face architrave. A triangular pediment adorned with alleged akroteria. The motto is: SAPERE AUDE (Dare to think) The flag is in proportions 2:3, sea green, with the University badge centered in yellow The Stamp reproduces the badge

== Campus Facilities ==
In 2012, within the 10th Anniversary celebrations, the Miguel de Cervantes European University inaugurates a new building of 5,000 square meters. There are also different actions in progress to improve other facilities on campus such as the TV set and the external appearance. The new building hosts the Clinic and the library, among other facilities.

The University comprises three Schools: Faculty for Health Sciences, Faculty for Social Sciences, Faculty for Economic and Juridical Sciences and the Polytechnic Faculty.

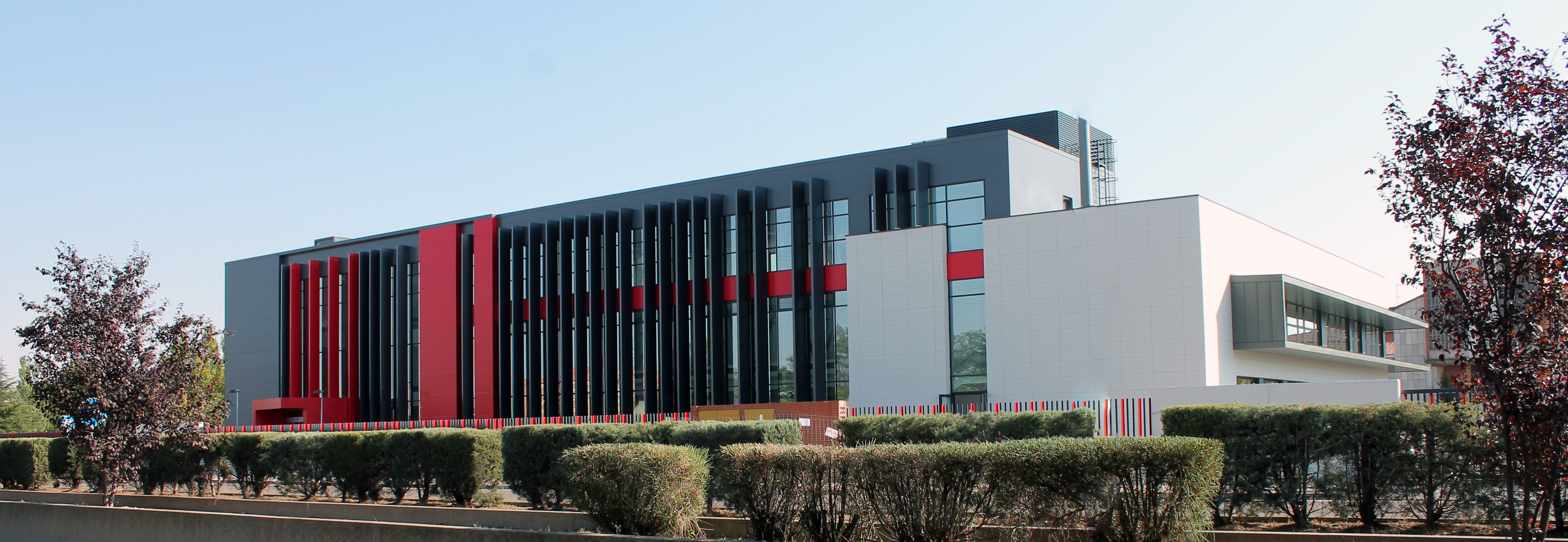
UEMC New Building
