= Runaway Island =

Island in Antarctica

Runaway Island (68°12′S 67°7′W) is a rocky island 0.7 nautical miles (1.3 km) west of the west tip of Neny Island and 0.2 nautical miles (0.4 km) northwest of surf rock, lying in Marguerite Bay off the west coast of Graham Land. The island was roughly charted in 1936 by the British Graham Land Expedition (BGLE), and was surveyed in 1947 by the Falkland Islands Dependencies Survey (FIDS). So named by FIDS because a runaway dog team left this island and returned to base.

== See also ==
- List of Antarctic and sub-Antarctic islands
