= Ssaurabi =

Saurabi (싸울아비) is a modern Korean compound which literally means "a father who fights".

It was first used in 1962 in a drama which was broadcast on Korean television. In an interview by The Dong-a Ilbo newspaper (November 20, 1962), the writer stated that it was coined.

In 1983, Kim Yong Woon, who specialized in mathematical history, said in his book Kankokujin to Nihonjin (Koreans and Japanese): It is said, "saul" to fight in Korean, and says, "abi" a man. When "man who fights" is expressed in Korean, it becomes "saulabi". It is thought that there seem to be some connection between "samurai" of Japan and "saulabi" of Korea However, the sound change from "Saurabi" to "Samurai" is considered to be linguistically unnatural, and comparison between a modern Korean word and a modern Japanese word and deducing that there must have been some ancient connection because the modern word sounds alike does not make any sense in the field of comparative linguistics. Since the word saulabi (or something close to that) can not be found in surviving ancient Korean texts nor can be seen in Japanese texts (if the term saulabi transformed into samurai, the transition should be evident in Japanese texts as well, but they are not), the argument that the word saulabi transformed into samurai seems, at least on a scientific level, very unlikely. Unless new evidence is uncovered either showing clear signs of transition or something providing definitive proof that the word originated in ancient Korea, this will be more of a pseudoscientific language comparison.

In Korean, to fight is "ssaul" and man is "abi". "Ssaurabi" would be the literal Korean expression for "a man who fights." At the risk of being scolded for logical leap, I have an amateurish idea that Japanese "samurai" has some connection to Korean "ssaurabi". (snip) the ssaurabi spirit, which had diminished in Korea, remained in original state as the samurai spirit in Japan.

The term ssaurabi earned recognition among South Koreans in 1990s possibly because the Korean editions of the Samurai Shodown series (fighting games) were released under the name of Ssaurabi Tuhon (싸울아비 투혼 literally "Ssaurabi fighting spirits").

Some Korean martial art organizations claim that the ssaurabi were warriors of Baekje, a kingdom in southwestern Korea, and that the Japanese samurai originated from the ssaurabi. The 2002 South Korean film Saulabi (variant romanization of ssaurabi), directed by Moon Jong-geum, dealt with this theory. This argument is odd in many ways because the original argument simply stated that the origin of the word samurai could have been saulabi and never mentioned anything about there being a similar class in ancient Korea.

Historically speaking, there is no literal evidence for the existence of the ssaurabi in Baekje. Linguistically, it is hard to explain the similarity between ssaurabi and samurai with regular correspondences between Korean and Japanese. Anachronism becomes clearer when examining the older form of ssauda. Since this verb appears as sahoda in Middle Korean documents, ssaurabi would be sahorabi in Middle Korean although no usage is known.

Another problem is that the word samurai, perhaps contrary to popular belief, originally had nothing to do with fighting or being a warrior. As explained in etymology of samurai, the word originally meant "those who serve in close attendance to nobility" and was originally pronounced "saburau". Therefore, the argument that the word samurai is derived from saulabi ("a man who fights") is highly unlikely.

== See also ==
- Pseudoscientific language comparison
