= This Is For World Tour =

2025–2026 concert tour by Twice

- World tour by Twice
- Location: Asia; Europe; North America; Oceania
- Associated album: This Is For; Ten: The Story Goes On
- Start date: July 19, 2025
- End date: July 12, 2026
- Legs: 2
- No. of shows: 81

Twice concert chronology
- Ready to Be World Tour (2023–2024); This Is For World Tour (2025–2026)

This Is For World Tour was the fourth worldwide and sixth overall concert tour headlined by South Korean girl group Twice, launched in support of their fourth studio album, This Is For (2025). The tour began on July 19, 2025, at the Inspire Arena in Incheon and spanned 81 shows, concluding at the KSPO Dome in Seoul on July 12, 2026.

== Background and production ==
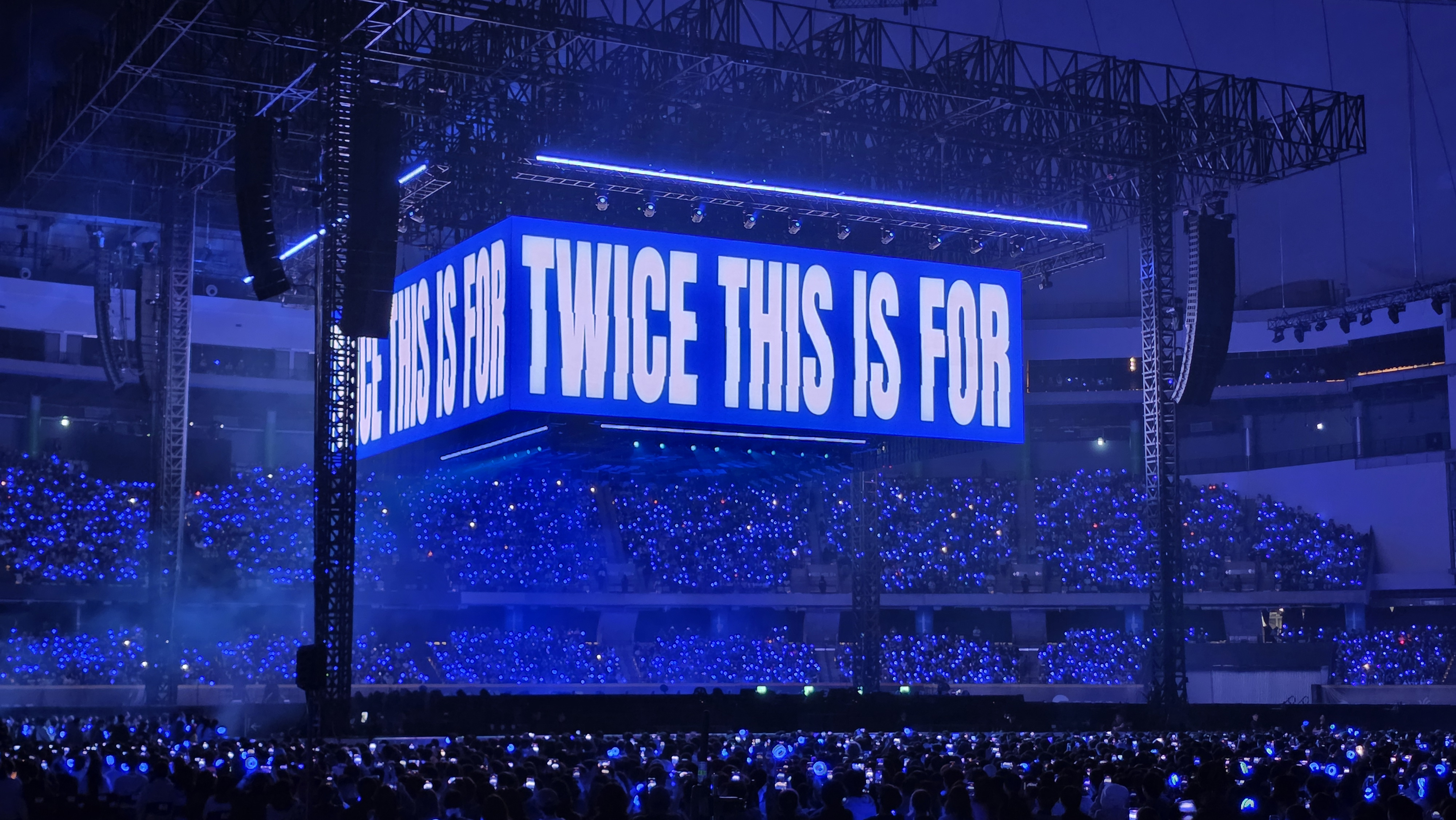
This Is For at Taipei Dome in March 2026

On June 9, 2025, JYP Entertainment announced that Twice would embark on their sixth world tour, with 23 initial tour dates in 13 cities. On August 27, a second show was added in Kaohsiung due to high demand. An additional show in Kuala Lumpur was announced on August 28. After the second concert in Tokyo on September 17, it was announced that Twice would continue the Japan leg of their world tour in Spring 2026. On September 18, a second show was added in Hong Kong. On October 1, the second part of the tour was announced, including North American and European legs and a stop in Taipei, starting with a show in Vancouver, Canada, in January 2026. Additional shows in London and North America were added on October 9, and a further ten shows were added on October 12, including a new stop in Turin. At the second concert in Kaohsiung on November 23, an additional show in Taipei was announced. On December 4, a third show in Taipei was added after all tickets sold out. On December 7, three concerts at the Japan National Stadium were announced. On June 2, 2026, JYP Entertainment announced that the tour would conclude the following month with three encore concerts in Seoul at the KSPO Dome.

Jihyo revealed in a vlog, posted on July 30, 2026 through the group's YouTube channel, that Twice originally had planned to tour in South America for their This is For World Tour, but the plan ultimately did not happen due to various issues, which also included failed venue bookings, but she later reassured fans that she and other members will have a future upcoming tour planned at South America at some point in the future.

Twice collaborated with Moment Factory for the stage design, with all venues utilizing a 360-degree stage setup to "create a more immersive concert experience". Moment Factory has collaborated with global artists like Olivia Rodrigo, Billie Eilish, Ed Sheeran, Madonna, Red Hot Chili Peppers, and U2. The show director, Mukhtar O.S. Mukhtar, worked with Kendrick Lamar and Usher on their Super Bowl halftime show performances. On June 24, 2025, lyric videos were released of the members' new solo songs for the tour. Full versions of these songs were released as part of the album Ten: The Story Goes On on October 10.

== Reception ==
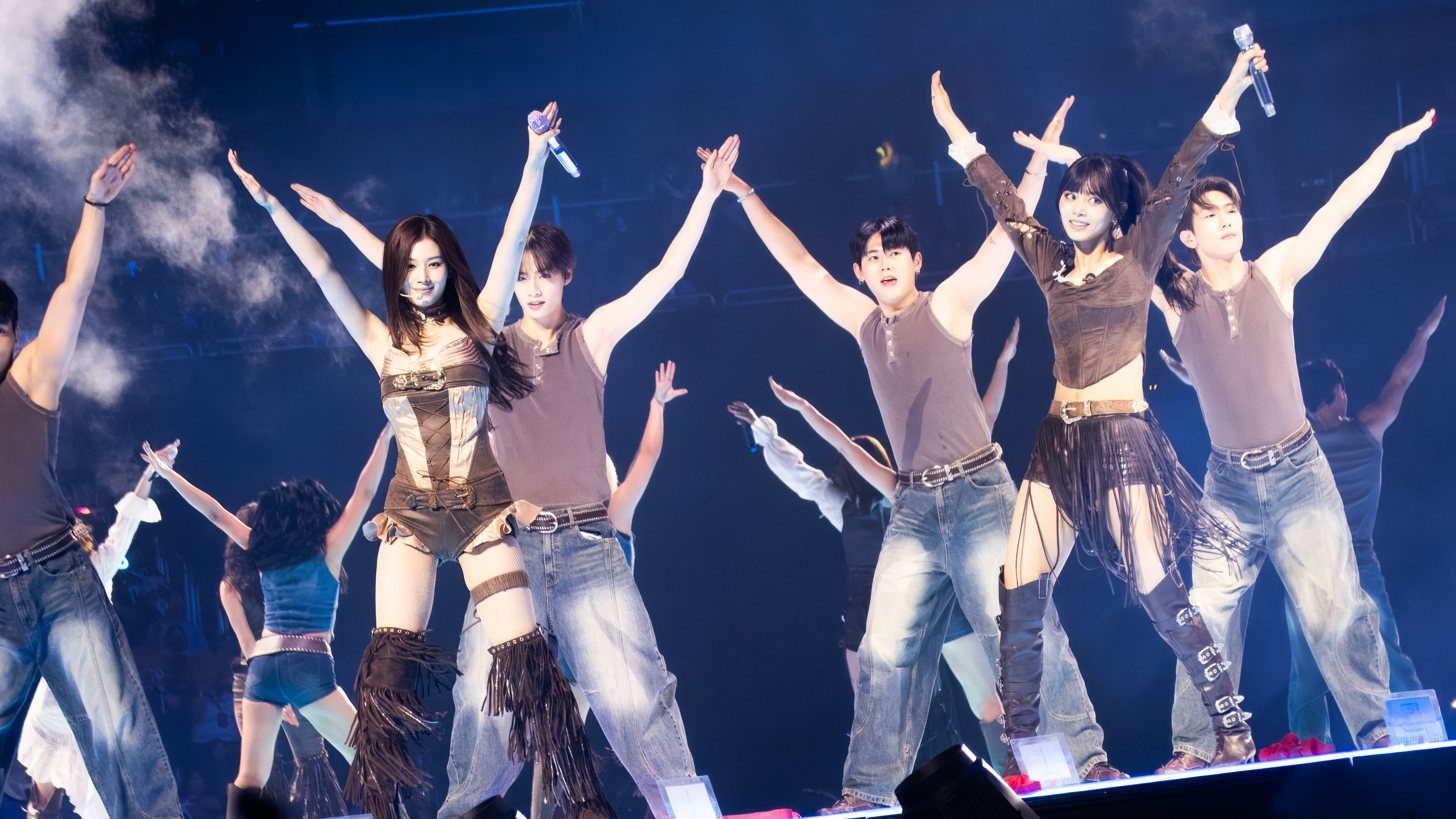
Twice performing at Climate Pledge Arena in January 2026 (Sana and Tzuyu pictured)

The tour received generally positive reviews from critics, who highlighted the tour's large-scale production and the group's sustained performance quality. PEP.ph described the Philippine Arena concert as a "dazzling, high-energy show", noting that the 360-degree stage design created a "vast sea of lightsticks" and enhanced audience immersion. Billboard Philippines reported strong crowd engagement at the group's Bulacan performance, citing extensive fan participation and positive audience response despite Jeongyeon's absence due to health concerns. The Daily Tribune praised the "stunning" stage design and the setlist, calling the Philippine Arena show a "once-in-a-lifetime experience". ABS-CBN News described the concert as a "dazzling feast for the senses", highlighting the production's 360-degree stage, moving platforms, and live band. The Straits Times highlighted the elaborate stage design and Twice's commanding performance.

== Commercial performance ==
The tour achieved significant commercial success, becoming one of Twice's highest-grossing concert tours. According to box-office data submitted to Pollstar, the first 24 reported shows sold 671,888 tickets and generated $93.8 million in gross revenue, averaging 27,995 attendees and $3.9 million per show. In Oceania, the tour achieved record-breaking sales, selling over 50,000 tickets across four arena performances in Sydney and Melbourne, making it the best-selling K-pop arena tour in the region to date.

The tour's Kaohsiung stops marked the first time that Twice performed in Taiwan. The two-day concert reportedly generated over NT$500 million (US$15.9 million) in tourism-related revenue for the city. The event increased pressure on urban infrastructure, and ridership on the Saturday of the concert weekend resulted in the city's metro system recording 350,000 riders, its highest single-day ridership of the year. Local businesses extended hours and reported significantly increased traffic and sales.

The tour's North American leg drew approximately 550,000 fans, setting a new record for the highest concert attendance in North America by a K-pop girl group. Twice became the first foreign artist to headline a concert at the Japan National Stadium, with the three shows garnering a total audience of 240,000.

== Set list ==
The following set list is from the concert in Incheon on July 19–20, 2025, and is not intended to represent all shows throughout the tour.

Act I

1. "This Is For"
2. "Strategy"
3. "Make Me Go"
4. "Set Me Free"
5. "I Can't Stop Me"
6. "Options"
7. "Moonlight Sunrise"

Act 2

8. "Mars"
9. "I Got You"
10. "The Feels"
11. "Gone"
12. "Cry for Me"
13. "Hell in Heaven"
14. "Right Hand Girl"

Act 3

15. "Dive In" (Tzuyu solo)
16. "Stone Cold" (Mina solo)
17. "Meeeeee" (Nayeon solo)
18. "Fix a Drink" (Jeongyeon solo)
19. "Dat Ahh Dat Ooh" (Jihyo, Sana, Dahyun, Chaeyoung, Tzuyu)
20. "Battitude" (Nayeon, Jeongyeon, Momo, Mina)
21. "Chess" (Dahyun solo)
22. "In My Room" (Chaeyoung solo)
23. "ATM" (Jihyo solo)
24. "Decaffeinated" (Sana solo)
25. "Move Like That" (Momo solo)

Act 4

26. "Fancy"
27. "What Is Love?"
28. "Yes or Yes"
29. "Dance the Night Away"
30. "Feel Special"
31. "One Spark"

Encore (Note: Additional encore songs were chosen by roulette wheel.)

1. "After Moon"
2. "You in My Heart"

=== Notes ===
- "Dat Ahh Dat Ooh" and "Battitude" were only performed in the South Korea shows in July 2025 & July 2026.
- "Enemy" replaced "The Feels" in the set list for the Japan shows.
- Beginning with the Tokyo shows, "Shoot (Firecracker)" replaced "In My Room" in the set list.
- Jeongyeon was absent from the Bulacan(4 October 2025) and Phoenix(28 January 2026) shows due to health issues.
- Chaeyoung suspended activities for health reasons in November 2025 until the end of the year, and was absent from the Kuala Lumpur through Pak Kret shows. She was also absent from the Orlando through Austin shows due to a back injury.
- In Hong Kong, Twice modified elements of their performances with due respect for the Wang Fuk Court fire, which included not performing "Hell in Heaven" and "One Spark".
- In 2026, "Takedown" was added to the beginning of Act 4 and "Feel Special" was removed from the main set list.
- Dahyun performed seated for the Seattle through Dallas shows due to a fractured ankle, and was absent from the Washington, D.C. through Austin shows. She returned starting from the Tokyo shows, and continued performing seated until the London shows. She returned to performing on stage the last 3 shows in Seoul from July 10-12.
- Mina was absent from the Philadelphia show due to health issues.
- Beginning with the Taipei shows, "Run Away" replaced "Dive In" in the set list.
- For the Japan National Stadium shows and the last 3 shows in Seoul from July 10-12, "Confetti" was added to the set list after "Takedown".
- For the finale shows in Seoul on July 10-12, Jihyo performed "Killin' Me Good" and Nayeon performed ABCD.

== Tour dates ==
List of 2025 shows
Date (2025)	City	Country	Venue	Attendance
July 19	Incheon	South Korea	Inspire Arena; Beyond Live (Note: July 20 only.)	—
July 20	Incheon	South Korea	Inspire Arena; Beyond Live	—
July 26	Osaka	Japan	Kyocera Dome Osaka	400,000
July 27	Osaka	Japan	Kyocera Dome Osaka	400,000
August 23	Nagoya	Japan	Vantelin Dome Nagoya	400,000
August 24	Nagoya	Japan	Vantelin Dome Nagoya	400,000
August 30	Fukuoka	Japan	Mizuho PayPay Dome Fukuoka	400,000
August 31	Fukuoka	Japan	Mizuho PayPay Dome Fukuoka	400,000
September 16	Tokyo	Japan	Tokyo Dome; Lemino (Note: September 17 only.)	400,000
September 17	Tokyo	Japan	Tokyo Dome; Lemino	400,000
September 27	Macau	China	Venetian Arena	—
September 28	Macau	China	Venetian Arena	—
October 4	Bulacan	Philippines	Philippine Arena	55,000
October 11	Singapore		Singapore Indoor Stadium	22,000
October 12	Singapore		Singapore Indoor Stadium	22,000
October 25	Kuala Lumpur	Malaysia	National Hockey Stadium	—
November 1	Sydney	Australia	Qudos Bank Arena	50,000
November 2	Sydney	Australia	Qudos Bank Arena	50,000
November 8	Melbourne	Australia	Rod Laver Arena	50,000
November 9	Melbourne	Australia	Rod Laver Arena	50,000
November 22	Kaohsiung	Taiwan	National Stadium	110,000
November 23	Kaohsiung	Taiwan	National Stadium	110,000
December 6	Hong Kong		Kai Tak Stadium	90,000
December 7	Hong Kong		Kai Tak Stadium	90,000
December 13	Pak Kret (Note: Labeled as Bangkok in promotional material.)	Thailand	Impact Arena	—
December 14	Pak Kret	Thailand	Impact Arena	—

List of 2026 shows
Date (2026)	City	Country	Venue	Attendance
January 9	Vancouver	Canada	Rogers Arena	550,000 (Note: The 550,000 attendance figure is combined from all 35 shows in North America.)
January 10	Vancouver	Canada	Rogers Arena	550,000
January 13	Seattle	United States	Climate Pledge Arena	550,000
January 14	Seattle	United States	Climate Pledge Arena	550,000
January 17	Oakland	United States	Oakland Arena	550,000
January 18	Oakland	United States	Oakland Arena	550,000
January 21	Inglewood (Note: Labeled as Los Angeles in promotional material.)	United States	Kia Forum	550,000
January 22	Inglewood	United States	Kia Forum	550,000
January 24	Inglewood	United States	Kia Forum	550,000
January 25	Inglewood	United States	Kia Forum	550,000
January 28	Phoenix	United States	Mortgage Matchup Center	550,000
January 31	Dallas	United States	American Airlines Center	550,000
February 1	Dallas	United States	American Airlines Center	550,000
February 13	Washington, D.C.	United States	Capital One Arena	550,000
February 14	Washington, D.C.	United States	Capital One Arena	550,000
February 18	Elmont (Note: Labeled as Belmont Park in promotional material.)	United States	UBS Arena	550,000
February 20	Elmont	United States	UBS Arena	550,000
February 21	Elmont	United States	UBS Arena	550,000
February 24	Philadelphia	United States	Xfinity Mobile Arena	550,000
February 27	Atlanta	United States	State Farm Arena	550,000
March 3	Montreal	Canada	Bell Centre	550,000
March 6	Hamilton	Canada	TD Coliseum	550,000
March 7	Hamilton	Canada	TD Coliseum	550,000
March 20	Taipei	Taiwan	Taipei Dome	120,000
March 21	Taipei	Taiwan	Taipei Dome	120,000
March 22	Taipei	Taiwan	Taipei Dome	120,000
March 27	Orlando	United States	Kia Center	
March 28	Orlando	United States	Kia Center	
March 31	Charlotte	United States	Spectrum Center	
April 3	Boston	United States	TD Garden	
April 4	Boston	United States	TD Garden	
April 6	Chicago	United States	United Center	
April 7	Chicago	United States	United Center	
April 10	Detroit	United States	Little Caesars Arena	
April 12	Saint Paul	United States	Grand Casino Arena	
April 14	Denver	United States	Ball Arena	
April 17	Austin	United States	Moody Center	
April 18	Austin	United States	Moody Center	
April 25	Tokyo	Japan	Japan National Stadium; U-Next (Note: April 28 only.)	240,000
April 26	Tokyo	Japan	Japan National Stadium; U-Next	240,000
April 28	Tokyo	Japan	Japan National Stadium; U-Next	240,000
May 9	Lisbon	Portugal	MEO Arena	—
May 12	Barcelona	Spain	Palau Sant Jordi	—
May 16	Paris	France	Accor Arena	—
May 17	Paris	France	Accor Arena	—
May 20	Turin	Italy	Inalpi Arena	—
May 23	Berlin	Germany	Uber Arena	—
May 26	Cologne	Germany	Lanxess Arena	—
May 30	Amsterdam	Netherlands	Ziggo Dome	—
May 31	Amsterdam	Netherlands	Ziggo Dome	—
June 3	London	England	The O2 Arena	—
June 4	London	England	The O2 Arena	—
July 10	Seoul (Note: Labeled as Finale.)	South Korea	KSPO Dome; Beyond Live (Note: July 12 only.)	—
July 11	Seoul	South Korea	KSPO Dome; Beyond Live	—
July 12	Seoul	South Korea	KSPO Dome; Beyond Live	—
Total				—

== Notes ==
Cities

Others

== See also ==
- List of Twice concert tours
