= This Is For =

2025 studio album by Twice

- Digital cover

Studio album by Twice
- Released: July 11, 2025
- Length: 36:14
- Languages: English; Korean
- Labels: JYP; Republic
- Producers: Will Bloomfield; Julian Bunetta; Leroy Clampitt; Mick Coogan; CQ; Daoud; Dem Jointz; Di Genius; Earattack; Gustav Landell; Woo Min Lee "Collapsedone"; James Daniel Lewis; Mac & Phil; Pink Slip; Reylt; John Ryan; Sim Eun-jee; Versachoi

Twice chronology
#Twice5 (2025)	This Is For (2025)	Enemy (2025)

Singles from This Is For
- 1. "This Is For" Released: July 11, 2025

This Is For is the fourth Korean studio album (ninth overall) by South Korean girl group Twice. It was released on July 11, 2025, through JYP Entertainment and Republic Records. The album consists of fourteen tracks, including lead single "This Is For" and five sub-unit tracks. It debuted at number one on the South Korean Circle Album Chart and number six on the US Billboard 200. Twice have been promoting the album on the tour of the same name since July 2025.

== Background and release ==
Twice began teasing their fourth studio album on May 19, 2025, with the release of a teaser video titled "Intro: Four". The short clip features all nine members, each wearing a blue skirt with "Four" written across it. The album is the group's first Korean-language studio release since Formula of Love: O+T=<3 (2021). The album's release date and title were announced on May 21. Regarding the title This Is For, member Dahyun explained that it is a play on words that represents the release being the group's fourth full album, as well as a work "for everyone, and for our fans".

On June 9, Twice announced the This Is For World Tour in support of the album. On June 26, the tracklist was revealed via their social media accounts, including five sub-unit tracks, similar to those in Formula of Love: O+T=<3. A few days prior, the group had shared nine solo tracks, one for each member, though none of these songs were included in the album. However, all nine solo tracks would later be on Ten: The Story Goes On. The album was released on July 11 alongside the music video for lead single "This Is For". The deluxe version of the album, released on July 14, includes an extended version of "This Is For" as well as "Takedown" from the KPop Demon Hunters soundtrack.

== Promotion ==
On July 8, Twice held eight "listening party" sessions where fans listened to the title track before its release. During the last session, Twice talked about the album and screened the "This Is For" music video. To promote the album, Twice performed "This Is For" on the music programs Music Bank, Show! Music Core, and Inkigayo on July 11, 12 and 13, respectively. They also performed songs from the album during the This Is For World Tour, which began at the Inspire Arena in Incheon on July 19. The group then performed "Right Hand Girl" and the extended version of "This Is For" during their headlining set at Lollapalooza on August 2.

== Reception ==
Professional ratings
Review scores
Source	Rating
AllMusic	4/5 stars
Beats Per Minute	84%
IZM	2.5/5 stars
Sputnikmusic	2.8/5

Chase McMullen of Beats Per Minute scored the album 84/100, calling it Twice's "tightest and most cohesive album to date" and praising the production and the group's performances. Taylor Swinton of Melodic Magazine called the album "Twice's declaration that they've earned their place at the top" and highlighted the distinct sound of each sub-unit track. Matt Collar of AllMusic awarded the album 4 out of 5 stars, saying that it "finds the K-pop girl group in an upbeat and swaggering dance club mood". Conversely, Raul Stanciu of Sputnikmusic scored the album 2.8 out of 5, criticizing the short length and derivative production on most of the tracks. He overall called the album "a 10th anniversary misstep" and considered it a disappointing follow-up to Formula of Love. Lee Jae-hoon of IZM gave the album 2.5 out of 5 stars, criticizing the songs for lacking substance. He said this is most evident in the sub-unit tracks, which fail to highlight the members' individual strengths.

Idology included This Is For in their list of the 20 best idol pop albums of 2025, calling it a "quintessential K-pop album, with a bright and cheerful K-pop style despite the increased proportion of English lyrics".

== Commercial performance ==
This Is For topped South Korea's Circle Album Chart for the week ending July 12, 2025, with 671,771 copies sold. In the United States, the album debuted at number six on the Billboard 200 with 80,000 equivalent album units, as reported by music data tracking firm Luminate. Of these, 68,000 were pure sales and 12,000 were streaming-equivalent units. This Is For is Twice's seventh top-10 record on the chart.

== Track listing ==
This Is For track listing
No.	Title	Lyrics	Music	Arrangement	Length
1.	"Four"	Sim Eun-jee	Sim	Sim	1:45
2.	"This Is For"	Tayla Parx; Em Walcott	Parx; Walcott; Gustav Landell; Stephen McGregor; Daoud Anthony	Landell; Di Genius; Daoud	2:11
3.	"Options"	Taet Chesterton; Iain James	Earattack; Chesterton; James; CQ	Earattack; CQ	3:06
4.	"Mars"	Jinli (Full8loom)	Kamille; Perrie Edwards; Romans; Will Bloomfield	Bloomfield	2:21
5.	"Right Hand Girl"	Taneisha Jackson; Georgia Ku; Morgan Connie Smith; James Daniel Lewis	Ku; Smith; Lewis	Lewis	2:31
6.	"Peach Gelato"	Mick Coogan; John Ryan; Julian Bunetta	Coogan; Ryan; Bunetta	Coogan; Ryan; Bunetta	2:18
7.	"Hi Hello"	Lee Eun-hwa (153/Joombas); Megan Bülow; Simon Wilcox; Matthew Holmes; Phil Leigh	Bülow; Wilcox; Holmes; Leigh	Mac & Phil	2:07
8.	"Battitude" (Nayeon, Jeongyeon, Momo, Mina)	Miranda Glory Inzunza; Alexis Andrea Boyd	Inzunza; Boyd	Dem Jointz	2:26
9.	"Dat Ahh Dat Ooh" (Sana, Jihyo, Dahyun, Chaeyoung, Tzuyu)	Kabba; MNEK; Baby Tate; Jamal Woon	Kabba; MNEK; Baby Tate; Woon; Relyt	Relyt	2:28
10.	"Let Love Go" (Jeongyeon, Momo, Sana, Tzuyu)	Amy Allen; Boy Matthews; Cleo Tighe; Kyle Buckley	Allen; Matthews; Tighe; Buckley	Pink Slip	2:58
11.	"G.O.A.T." (Mina, Dahyun, Chaeyoung)	Gusten Dahlqvist; Arineh Karimi	Versachoi; Dahlqvist; Karimi	Versachoi	2:25
12.	"Talk" (Nayeon, Jihyo)	Chesterton	Earattack; Chesterton	Earattack	2:48
13.	"Seesaw"	Lee Seu-ran	Allen; Leroy Clampitt; Bülow; James Abrahart	Clampitt	3:30
14.	"Heartbreak Avenue"	Ari PenSmith; Angelina Sherie	Woo Min Lee "Collapsedone"; PenSmith; Sherie	W. Lee	3:16
Total length:					36:14

This Is For Deluxe track listing
No.	Title	Lyrics	Music	Arrangement	Length
15.	"This Is For" (Extended)	Parx; Walcott	Parx; Walcott; Landell; McGregor; Anthony	Landell; Di Genius; Daoud	2:26
16.	"Takedown" (Jeongyeon, Jihyo, Chaeyoung)	Lindgren	Lindgren	Lindgren; Ian Eisendrath	3:00
Total length:					41:40

== Personnel ==
Musicians

- Twice – vocals (all tracks)
  - Nayeon – background vocals (track 1)
  - Jeongyeon – background vocals (track 1)
  - Jihyo – background vocals (track 1)
  - Mina – background vocals (track 1)
- Sim Eun-jee – computer programming, keyboard, bass, drum, synth (track 1)
- Tayla Parx – background vocals (track 2)
- Earattack – all instruments (tracks 3, 12)
- CQ – all instruments (track 3)
- Moonhyuck Byun – all instruments (track 3)
- Taet Chesterton – background vocals (tracks 3, 12)
- Jinli (Full8loom) – background vocals (tracks 4, 13)
- Sophia Pae – background vocals (tracks 5–11, 14)
- John Ryan – programming, bass, percussion, synths, drums, guitar (track 6)
- Julian Bunetta – programming, bass, percussion, synths, drums (track 6)
- Versachoi – computer programming, all instruments (track 11)
- Woo Min Lee "Collapsedone" – computer programming, electric guitar, bass, keys, synth (track 14)

Technical

- Kwon Nam-woo – mastering (tracks 1, 3–14)
- Shin Bong-won – mixing (track 14), Dolby Atmos mixing (all tracks)
  - Park Nam-jun – Dolby Atmos mixing assistance
- Sim Eun-jee – vocal direction, vocal editing (track 1)
- Eom Se-hee – recording (tracks 1, 7, 11), digital editing (track 7)
- Lee Tae-sub – mixing (tracks 1–5, 8–9, 11–12)
- Earattack – vocal direction (tracks 2–3, 10, 12), recording (tracks 2–3, 12)
- KayOne – digital editing (tracks 2–3, 11–12)
- Kwak Bo-eun – recording (tracks 2, 4, 6–10, 13)
- Lee Sang-yeop – recording (track 2), digital editing (track 9)
- Lim Chan-mi – recording (tracks 2–4, 14)
- Randy Merrill – mastering (track 2)
- Seo Eun-il – recording (tracks 3, 6, 10), digital editing (track 10)
- Jinli (Full8loom) – vocal direction, digital editing (tracks 4, 13)
- Goo Hye-jin – recording (tracks 3, 5, 12–14), digital editing (track 8)
- Sophia Pae – vocal direction (tracks 5–9, 14)
- Park Eun-jung – digital editing (track 5), mixing (track 13)
- Andrew Choi – vocal direction (track 6)
- Kim Gab-soo – digital editing, mixing (track 6)
- Lee Chang-hoon – mixing (track 7), recording (track 11)
- Choi Hye-jin – mixing (track 10)
- Noday – vocal direction (track 11)
- Woo Min Lee "Collapsedone" – vocal direction, vocal editing (track 14)

== Charts ==
=== Weekly charts ===
Weekly chart performance
Chart (2025)	Peak position
Australian Albums (ARIA)	66
Austrian Albums (Ö3 Austria)	30
Belgian Albums (Ultratop Flanders)	51
Belgian Albums (Ultratop Wallonia)	54
Canadian Albums (Billboard)	58
Croatian International Albums (HDU)	7
Finnish Physical Albums (Suomen virallinen lista)	8
French Albums (SNEP)	21
German Albums (Offizielle Top 100)	27
Greek Albums (IFPI)	27
Hungarian Physical Albums (MAHASZ)	5
Japanese Albums (Oricon)	4
Japanese Combined Albums (Oricon)	3
Japanese Hot Albums (Billboard Japan)	3
New Zealand Albums (RMNZ)	36
Portuguese Albums (AFP)	18
South Korean Albums (Circle)	1
Spanish Albums (PROMUSICAE)	37
Swedish Physical Albums (Sverigetopplistan)	14
Swiss Albums (Schweizer Hitparade)	75
UK Album Downloads (Official Charts)	26
US Billboard 200	6

=== Monthly charts ===
Monthly chart performance
Chart (2025)	Position
Japanese Albums (Oricon)	13
South Korean Albums (Circle)	3

=== Year-end charts ===
Year-end chart performance
Chart (2025)	Position
Japanese Hot Albums (Billboard Japan)	77
South Korean Albums (Circle)	28

== Certifications ==
Certifications
Region	Certification	Certified units/sales
South Korea (KMCA)	3× Platinum	750,000^{^}
^{^} Shipments figures based on certification alone.
