= Twice5 =

2025 compilation album by Twice

#Twice5

Compilation album by Twice
- Released: May 14, 2025
- Genres: J-pop; K-pop
- Languages: Japanese; Korean; English
- Label: Warner Music Japan
- Producer: J. Y. Park "The Asiansoul"

Twice chronology
Strategy (2024)	#Twice5 (2025)	This Is For (2025)

#Twice5 (Hashtag Twice5) is the fifth Japanese compilation album released by South Korean girl group Twice. The album consists of Japanese and Korean versions of "Talk That Talk", "Set Me Free", and "One Spark"; and English songs – "I Got You" and "Strategy". It was released on May 14, 2025, under Warner Music Japan.

== Background and release ==
In January 2025, JYP Entertainment announced in an official statement that Twice's fifth compilation album was set to be released on May 14. The Japanese version of "Talk That Talk" was pre-released as a digital single on April 14, 2025.

The album was officially released on May 14, 2025. The digital and streaming version of #Twice5 was released in EP format, only containing Japanese-language tracks.

== Commercial performance ==
Following its release, #Twice5 debuted at number three on the Oricon Albums Chart, selling 68,730 copies. Billboard Japan reported that the album sold 81,813 copies in its first week. It was subsequently certified Gold by the Recording Industry Association of Japan.

== Track listing ==
#Twice5 — Standard edition
No.	Title	Lyrics	Music	Arrangement	Length
1.	"Talk That Talk" (Japanese version)	Danke (Lalala Studio); Yu-ki Kokubo	Woo Min Lee "collapsedone"; MRCH	Woo Min Lee "collapsedone"; MRCH	2:58
2.	"Set Me Free" (Japanese version)	Galactika; Jvde (Galactika); Yohei	Melanie Fontana; Lindgren; Marty Maro	Lindgren	3:02
3.	"One Spark" (Japanese version)	Sim Eunjee; Melanie Fontana; Yu-ki Kokubo	Kyler Nico; Earattack; Paulina "Pau" Cerrilla; Lee Woo Hyun	Earattack; Lee Woo Hyun	3:04
4.	"Talk That Talk"	Danke (Lalala Studio)	Woo Min Lee "collapsedone"; MRCH	Woo Min Lee "collapsedone"; MRCH
5.	"Set Me Free"	Galactika; Jvde (Galactika)	Melanie Fontana; Lindgren; Marty Maro	Lindgren
6.	"I Got You"	Jonah Marais; Daniel Seavey; David Wilson; Jake Torrey; Lexxi Saal	Jonah Marais; Daniel Seavey; David Wilson; Jake Torrey; Lexxi Saal	Dwilly
7.	"One Spark"	Sim Eunjee; Melanie Fontana	Kyler Nico; Earattack; Paulina "Pau" Cerrilla; Lee Woo Hyun	Earattack; Lee Woo Hyun
8.	"Strategy"	Boy Matthews; Cleo Tighe	Earattack; Boy Matthews; Cleo Tighe; Lee Woo Hyun	Earattack; Lee Woo Hyun

#Twice5 — Limited edition B (DVD)
No.	Title	Length
1.	"Talk That Talk" (music video)
2.	"Set Me Free" (music video)
3.	"I Got You" (music video)
4.	"One Spark" (music video)
5.	"Strategy" (music video)
6.	"Twice5 Jacket Shooting Making Movie"
7.	"Twice5 Jacket Member Making Movie"

#Twice5 — Digital and streaming edition
No.	Title	Length
1.	"Talk That Talk" (Japanese version)	2:58
2.	"Set Me Free" (Japanese version)	3:02
3.	"One Spark" (Japanese version)	3:04

== Charts ==
=== Weekly charts ===
Weekly chart performance for #Twice5
Chart (2025)	Peak position
Japanese Albums (Oricon)	3
Japanese Combined Albums (Oricon)	3
Japanese Hot Albums (Billboard Japan)	6

=== Monthly charts ===
Monthly chart performance for #Twice5
Chart (2025)	Position
Japanese Albums (Oricon)	7

=== Year-end charts ===
Year-end chart performance for #Twice5
Chart (2025)	Position
Japanese Albums (Oricon)	67
Japanese Top Albums Sales (Billboard Japan)	59

== Certifications ==
Certifications for #Twice5
Region	Certification	Certified units/sales
Japan (RIAJ) Physical	Gold	100,000^{^}
^{^} Shipments figures based on certification alone.

== Release history ==
Release dates and formats for #Twice5
Region	Date	Format(s)	Edition	Label	Ref.
Various	May 14, 2025	Digital download; streaming	Standard edition	Warner Music Japan	
Japan	May 14, 2025	CD	Standard edition	Warner Music Japan	
Japan	May 14, 2025	CD + photo book	Limited Edition A	Warner Music Japan	
Japan	May 14, 2025	CD + DVD	Limited Edition B	Warner Music Japan	
