= Strategy (EP) =

2024 extended play by Twice

- Digital cover

EP by Twice
- Released: December 6, 2024
- Genre: Electropop · bubblegum pop · R&B
- Length: 20:44
- Languages: English; Korean
- Labels: JYP; Republic

Twice chronology
Dive (2024)	Strategy (2024)	#Twice5 (2025)

Singles from Strategy
- 1. "Strategy" Released: December 6, 2024

Strategy is the fourteenth extended play by South Korean girl group Twice. It was released on December 6, 2024, through JYP Entertainment and Republic Records. The EP consists of seven tracks, including the group's fourth original English-language single "Strategy" featuring Megan Thee Stallion. The album blends electro-pop, R&B, and the group's signature bubblegum pop, fusing '80s influences with Y2K sounds. It debuted at number one on the South Korean Circle Album Chart and number four on the US Billboard 200.

== Background ==
In 2024, Twice released their thirteenth Korean EP, With You-th on February 23. The album became their first to reach number one on the US Billboard 200. They followed it with their fifth Japanese studio album, Dive on July 17.

On October 20, Twice held a fan meeting titled "Home 9round" to commemorate the ninth anniversary of their debut. During the event, they performed the unreleased track "Sweetest Obsession" and announced their fourteenth EP, Strategy, set for release on December 6. On October 25, Twice was featured on a remix of American rapper Megan Thee Stallion's "Mamushi", which was included on Megan: Act II, the deluxe reissue of her third studio album Megan. In turn, it was announced that Megan Thee Stallion would feature on Strategy's lead single of the same name, "Strategy". On November 21, Twice headlined Amazon Music Live and gave a quick preview of "Strategy" during the show.

== Promotion ==
On December 4, Twice held a premiere event for fans at New Millennium Hall, Konkuk University, where they introduced the songs in the EP. During the event, they screened the "Strategy" music video and performed "Magical" for the first time. To promote the EP, Twice performed "Strategy" on the music program Music Bank on December 6. That same day, they performed "Strategy" on the late-night music talk show The Seasons: Lee Young-ji's Rainbow, with host Lee Young-ji performing Megan Thee Stallion's rap. Twice's planned promotion on music programs was cut short, as Show! Music Core and Inkigayo were canceled due to South Korean president Yoon Suk Yeol's declaration of martial law and the subsequent impeachment votes against him. Twice's pre-recorded performance on Show! Music Core was broadcast on December 15, and they also performed on Inkigayo that same day.

== Composition ==
The EP shows a shift in style, blending electro-pop and R&B with the group's usual bubblegum pop sound. While experimenting with new genres, they still include tracks that stick to their classic pop roots, balancing fresh ideas with the familiar. The sound of Strategy blends eras—some tracks capture the breezy '80s-inspired pop that feels straight out of a "vintage teen movie soundtrack." On the other, tracks like "Like It Like It" and "Sweetest Obsession" channel Y2K nostalgia, pushing the group's sound into the early 2000s.

== Critical reception ==
Professional ratings
Review scores
Source	Rating
NME	4/5 stars
AllMusic	3.5/5 stars

In a review for NME, Rhian Daly gave the album four out of five stars, describing it as influenced by 80s and Y2K pop. She characterized it as an upbeat and "bubbly" album, taking place "in a world where flirtations and the potential of romance can solve any problem". Daly finished her review by writing that "as they enter their 10th year together, Twice are still flying incredibly high all on their own." Marcy Donelson of AllMusic awarded the album 3.5 out of five stars, writing that the album "keeps the dance party going" and praising its "uplifting, groove-forward pop tracks that balance affection and empowerment."

== Commercial performance ==
Strategy topped South Korea's Circle Album Chart for the week ending December 7, 2024, with over 800,000 copies sold. In the United States, the EP debuted at number four on the Billboard 200 with 88,000 equivalent album units, as reported by music data tracking firm Luminate. Of these, 81,000 were pure sales, 6,500 were streaming-equivalent units, and less than 500 were track-equivalent units. Strategy is Twice's sixth top-10 record on the chart.

== Track listing ==
Strategy track listing
No.	Title	Lyrics	Music	Arrangement	Length
1.	"Strategy" (featuring Megan Thee Stallion)	Boy Matthews; Cleo Tighe; Megan Pete	Earattack; Matthews; Tighe; Lee Woo-hyun	Earattack; Lee W.	3:21
2.	"Kiss My Troubles Away"	Lauren Aquilina; Albert Stanaj; Ryan Marrone	Aquilina; Stanaj; Marrone	Marrone; The Imports	2:54
3.	"Like It Like It"	Youra (Full8loom); Chari (153/Joombas); Rizin (153/Joombas); Lee Hyeong-seok	Gabriel Benjamin; Sofia Quinn	G. Benjamin	3:02
4.	"Sweetest Obsession"	Geum Ru-na (Lalala Studio)	Lauren LaRue; Brandon Benjamin; Xansei	B. Benjamin; Xansei	2:46
5.	"Keeper"	Dahyun	Rachel West; Malia Civetz; Barry Cohen; Rob Grimaldi	Gingerbread; Grimaldi	2:35
6.	"Magical"	Johan Fransson; Autumn Marie Buysse	Fransson; Buysse; Oliver Lundström	Fransson; Lundström	3:16
7.	"Strategy"	Matthews; Tighe	Earattack; Matthews; Tighe; Lee W.	Earattack; Lee W.	2:46
Total length:					20:44

== Personnel ==
Musicians

- Twice – vocals, background vocals (tracks 1, 7)
- Earattack – all instruments (tracks 1, 7)
- Lee Woo-hyun – all instruments (tracks 1, 7)
- Kim Jong-seong – guitar (tracks 1, 7)
- Shorelle – background vocals (tracks 1, 7)
- Ryan Marrone – drum programming, guitar, synthesizer programming (track 2)
- The Imports – drum programming, keyboards (track 2)
- Albert Stanaj – piano (track 2)
- Sophia Pae – background vocals (tracks 2, 4–6)
- C'SA – background vocals (track 3)
- Gingerbread – drums, programming, synthesizer (track 5)
- Rob Grimaldi – drums, programming, synthesizer (track 5)
- Johan Fransson – bass programming, drum programming, keyboards, string arrangement (track 6)
- Oliver Lundström – keyboards, additional programming (track 6)

Technical

- Kwon Nam-woo – mastering
- Shin Bong-won – Atmos mix engineering
  - Park Nam-jun – Atmos mix engineering assistance
- Lee Kyung-won – digital editing (tracks 1, 6, 7)
- Earattack – recording and vocal direction (tracks 1, 2, 6, 7), vocal production (tracks 1, 7)
- Seo Eun-il – recording (tracks 1, 4, 5, 7)
- Lim Chan-mi – recording (tracks 1, 7)
- Shawn "Source" Jarrett – recording for Megan Thee Stallion (track 1)
  - Dominique "Cookisdope" Cook – engineering assistance (track 1)
  - Dylan Spence – engineering assistance (track 1)
  - Trinity "Aux" Wohlferd – engineering assistance (track 1)
- Leslie Brathwaite – mixing for Megan Thee Stallion (track 1)
- Lee Tae-sub – mixing (tracks 1, 7)
- Goo Hye-jin – digital editing (track 2)
- Kwak Bo-eun – recording (tracks 2, 6), digital editing (track 4)
- Park Eun-jung – mixing (track 2), digital editing (track 5)
- C'Sa – digital editing, vocal direction (track 3)
- Lee Chang-hoon – recording (track 3)
- Lim Hong-jin – mixing (tracks 3, 5)
- Sophia Pae – vocal direction (tracks 4, 5)
- Choi Hye-jin – mixing (track 4)
- Eom Se-hee – mixing (track 6)

== Charts ==
=== Weekly charts ===
Weekly chart performance
Chart (2024)	Peak position
Belgian Albums (Ultratop Flanders)	99
Belgian Albums (Ultratop Wallonia)	90
Croatian International Albums (HDU)	10
French Albums (SNEP)	44
German Albums (Offizielle Top 100)	56
Greek Albums (IFPI)	52
Hungarian Physical Albums (MAHASZ)	11
Japanese Albums (Oricon)	2
Japanese Combined Albums (Oricon)	2
Japanese Hot Albums (Billboard Japan)	11
Portuguese Albums (AFP)	8
South Korean Albums (Circle)	1
Swiss Albums (Schweizer Hitparade)	47
UK Album Downloads (Official Charts)	6
US Billboard 200	4

=== Monthly charts ===
Monthly chart performance
Chart (2024)	Position
Japanese Albums (Oricon)	11
South Korean Albums (Circle)	2

=== Year-end charts ===
2024 year-end chart performance
Chart (2024)	Position
South Korean Albums (Circle)	28

2025 year-end chart performance
Chart (2025)	Position
Japanese Albums (Oricon)	83
Japanese Download Albums (Billboard Japan)	83

== Certifications ==
Certifications
Region	Certification	Certified units/sales
South Korea (KMCA)	3× Platinum	750,000^{^}
^{^} Shipments figures based on certification alone.
