= Ten: The Story Goes On =

2025 studio album by Twice

- Digital cover

Studio album by Twice
- Released: October 10, 2025
- Length: 28:49
- Languages: English; Korean
- Labels: JYP; Republic
- Producers: Timothy Bullock; Diztortion; FriendsFromCollege; TK Kayembe; Kizzo; Daniel "Obi" Klein; Lee Hae Sol; Mikhail Miller; Roy Lenzo; Tim Randolph; Risc; Oscar Scheller; Shift K3Y; Team Galactika

Twice chronology
Enemy (2025)	Ten: The Story Goes On (2025)	#Best 2015–2025 (2026)

Singles from Ten: The Story Goes On
- 1. "Me+You" Released: October 10, 2025

Ten: The Story Goes On is the fifth Korean studio album (eleventh overall) by South Korean girl group Twice. It was released on October 10, 2025, through JYP Entertainment and Republic Records to commemorate the group's tenth anniversary since their debut in 2015. The album consists of ten tracks: the lead single, "Me+You", and nine solo tracks previously performed on the This Is For World Tour.

== Release and promotion ==
On September 19, 2025, JYP Entertainment announced that Twice would release a special album on October 10 to celebrate their tenth anniversary. A prologue film was released the next day, featuring the group participating in a talent show themed around the number ten, in the style of a sitcom. On September 21, the album's digital cover was revealed, featuring Twice in the same poses as the group concept photos for their debut EP, The Story Begins (2015). On September 29, the album's track list was released through a teaser video, confirming the inclusion of a single titled "Me+You" and a solo track for each member of the group. Short versions of these solo songs were first performed on the This Is For World Tour, which began in July 2025. The album was released on October 10 with an accompanying music video for "Me+You". The music video features actor Uhm Tae-goo and references the music videos for Twice's singles "Like Ooh-Ahh" (2015), "Knock Knock" (2017) and "What Is Love?" (2018).

Twice did not promote "Me+You" on any South Korean music programs. They performed the song for the first time at their tenth anniversary fan meeting, titled "10ve Universe", held at Korea University's Hwajeong Gymnasium on October 18, 2025.

== Composition ==
Ten: The Story Goes On is a pop album with hip-hop influences, incorporating other genres such as country, dark pop, and R&B, with lyrics primarily in English.

The album opens with the lead single "Me+You", a song influenced by R&B and pop music of the 1990s with lyrics that discuss Twice's relationship with their fans along with the relationship between the group's members. It continues with Nayeon's "Meeeeee", a song about self-confidence that combines dance-pop, reminiscent of her solo single "ABCD", with Miami bass and R&B. The third track, Jeongyeon's "Fix a Drink", is a song that takes influence from genres such as country pop and country-folk with lyrics about letting go of one's worries. Momo's "Move Like That" is a combination of dance music and deep house, and its lyrics are about a shared intimate moment between two people in a crowd. In "Decaffeinated," Sana sings about a dangerous love she cannot leave, accompanied by tropical house and dance pop sounds.

The album continues with Jihyo's "ATM", an R&B and hip-hop track about self-confidence. Ejae, co-writer of "Golden", is credited as a songwriter for the track. The next track, Mina's "Stone Cold", features elements of deconstructed club and dark pop, and has lyrics which discuss a relationship that has "gone cold". Dahyun's "Chess" features an interpolation of Ludwig van Beethoven's "Für Elise" and lyrics that speak of overcoming betrayal. The ninth track, Chaeyoung's "In My Room", is a UK garage and bubblegum bass track that has been compared to the musical style of PinkPantheress. The album's final track is "Dive In", a pop and R&B track performed by Tzuyu.

== Critical reception ==
Professional ratings
Review scores
Source	Rating
AllMusic	3/5 stars
Clash	8/10 stars
The Rice Thresher	3/5 stars

Sofia Gomez of Clash awarded the album 8 out of 10 stars, noting that it "exhibits an evolved sound that sets up a pathway for Twice's career in 2026 and onwards". She praised the members for "find[ing] their footing and artistic sound" with their solo songs, but criticized the short duration of most of the tracks. The album appeared on Billboard's list of the best K-pop albums of 2025, with Abby Webster writing that it "goes from strength to strength on its individual member tracks". Neil Z. Yeung of AllMusic gave the album three out of five stars, calling it a "standard foray into hip-hop-inflected pop and smooth production that offers few surprises."

Chyenne Tatum of Teen Vogue named "Me+You" as one of the 15 best K-pop music videos of 2025, saying that it "isn't afraid to show the members as they truly are: a bit quirky, very silly, and most importantly, girls who just wanna have fun."

Chase McMullen of Beats Per Minute included "In My Room", "Meeeeee", and "Fix a Drink" in the list of the website's best releases of October 2025. McMullen described "In My Room" as a "slice of delightful, giddy bedroom pop, more indebted to PinkPantheress than her full project would prove to be, but just as perfect," and praised its lyrics as "a dedication to your inner-introvert". McMullen also praised Jeongyeon's vocals on "Fix a Drink", saying that "her soulful voice befits wounded country pop like a snug, cowhide glove." "Meeeeee" is called "[a] track something only Twice’s ultimate champion of self-love could deliver,", with McMullen saying that it "was bouncing around [his] head for days after catching some of the group's This Is For tour stops".

Charlie Cruz of The Rice Thresher gave the album a rating of three out of five, saying it "falters in execution rather than concept." Cruz praised the album's musical diversity, saying that "[t]hese singles aren’t just stylistic experiments for the sake of it, but statements about what K-pop can include," but said that the tracks are better approached separately rather than in the context of a full album. The short length of the tracks and "laid-back" production of some tracks is also criticised; Cruz described Jeongyeon's vocal performance in "Fix a Drink" as "underutilized". Cruz also criticised the interpolation of "Für Elise" on Dahyun's "Chess", saying that it "overshadows everything else about the track."

Ten: The Story Goes On on year-end listsYear-end lists
Publication	List	Rank	Ref.
Billboard	The 25 Best K-Pop Albums of 2025: Staff Picks	23	

== Commercial performance ==
Ten: The Story Goes On debuted at number 2 on South Korea's Circle Album Chart for the week ending October 11, 2025, selling over 260,000 copies. In the United States, the album debuted at number 11 on the Billboard 200, making Twice the first K-pop girl group to have ten albums enter the chart. According to music data tracking firm Luminate, the album sold 23,000 copies in the United States.

== Track listing ==
Ten: The Story Goes On track listing
No.	Title	Lyrics	Music	Arrangement	Length
1.	"Me+You"	Twice; Charli Taft; Kenzie; Daniel "Obi" Klein	Klein; Kenzie; Taft	Klein for Illsonique	2:55
2.	"Meeeeee" (Nayeon solo)	Nayeon; Tayla Parx; Cleo Tighe	Nayeon; Parx; Tighe; Roy Lenzo; TK Kayembe	Lenzo; Kayembe	2:46
3.	"Fix a Drink" (Jeongyeon solo)	Lee Yi-jin (153/Joombas); Joo Hwan	Tighe; Tom Mann; Risc; Jon Shave	Risc	2:58
4.	"Move Like That" (Momo solo)	JQ (MUMW); Kim Bada (MUMW)	Lewis Jankel; Neil Ormandy; Grant Knoche	Shift K3Y	2:47
5.	"Decaffeinated" (Sana solo)	Jvde (Galactika); Friday (Galactika)	Galactika; Woobin (Galactika); Ayushy (The Hub)	Team Galactika	3:00
6.	"ATM" (Jihyo solo)	Ejae; JT Roach	Ejae; Roach; Timothy "Bos" Bullock; Mikhail Miller	Bullock; Miller	3:36
7.	"Stone Cold" (Mina solo)	Christian Fast; Maria Marcus	Lee Hae-sol; Marcus; Fast	Lee	2:45
8.	"Chess" (Dahyun solo)	Dahyun; Natania Lalwani; Miranda Glory Inzunza; Blush Davis	Lalwani; Inzunza; Davis; Nikolay Mohr; Joshua Linne	FriendsFromCollege	2:29
9.	"In My Room" (Chaeyoung solo)	Dave Gibson; Ellise Mariana Gitas	Oscar Scheller; William Henry Schultz; Tim Randolph; Gitas; Gibson	Randolph; Scheller; Schultz	2:49
10.	"Dive In" (Tzuyu solo)	Bellah; Carmen Reece	Diztortion; Kizzo	Diztortion; Kizzo	2:44
Total length:					28:49

== Personnel ==
Musicians

- Twice – vocals
- Noday – vocal direction (tracks 1, 4, 7)
- Charli Taft – background vocals (1)
- Cleo Tighe – vocal direction (2)
- Jane Kim – vocal direction (2)
- Roy Lenzo – vocal direction (2)
- Tayla Parx – vocal direction (2)
- TK Kayembe – vocal direction (2)
- Sophia Pae – vocal direction (3, 8–10), background vocals (3, 8, 10)
- Jinli (Full8loom) – background vocals (4)
- Team Galactika – programming (5)
  - Chang – bass, drums, guitar, synthesizer (5)
  - Woobin – bass, drums, guitar, synthesizer (5)
  - E.SO – background vocals (5)
  - Junha – background vocals (5)
  - Friday – vocal direction (5)
  - Jvde – vocal direction (5)
- Ayushy – background vocals (5)
- Ejae – background vocals, vocal direction (6)
- Earattack – vocal direction (6)
- Lee Hae-sol – bass, drums, keyboards, synthesizer (7)

Technical

- Lee Taesub – mixing (1, 3, 6, 9, 10)
- Choi Hyejin – mixing (2), recording (6)
- Park Eunjung – mixing (4)
- Gu Jong-Pil – mixing (5)
- Alawn – mixing (7)
- Lim Hongjin – mixing (8)
- Kwon Nam Woo – mastering
- Kwak Bouen – recording (1, 8)
- Lim Chanmi – recording (2), digital editing (4)
- Goo Hyejin – recording, digital editing (3)
- Eom Sehee – recording (4, 5), digital editing (5)
- Eom Sehyun – recording, digital editing, mix engineering (5)
- Lee Sangyeop – recording (5)
- Lee Changhoon – recording (7, 10), digital editing (10)
- Seo Eunil – recording, digital editing (9)
- Kayone – digital editing (1, 2)
- Shin Bongwon – Atmos mixing
- Park Namjun – Atmos mixing assistance

== Charts ==
=== Weekly charts ===
Weekly chart performance
Chart (2025–2026)	Peak position
Croatian International Albums (HDU)	28
French Albums (SNEP)	119
Japanese Albums (Oricon)	5
Japanese Combined Albums (Oricon)	6
Japanese Hot Albums (Billboard Japan)	7
South Korean Albums (Circle)	2
UK Album Downloads (Official Charts)	76
US Billboard 200	11

=== Monthly charts ===
Monthly chart performance
Chart (2025)	Position
Japanese Albums (Oricon)	31
South Korean Albums (Circle)	8

=== Year-end charts ===
Year-end chart performance
Chart (2025)	Position
South Korean Albums (Circle)	63

== Certifications ==
Certifications
Region	Certification	Certified units/sales
South Korea (KMCA)	Platinum	250,000^{^}
^{^} Shipments figures based on certification alone.
