= Whenever (Megan Thee Stallion song) =

Single by Megan Thee Stallion
- Released: April 25, 2025
- Genre: Hip hop
- Length: 2:45
- Label: Hot Girl
- Songwriters: Megan Pete; Taylor Banks; Joel Banks; Shawn "Source" Jarrett; Jimmie Duncan; Elisa Hood (uncredited)
- Lyricist: Megan Pete
- Producers: Bankroll Got It; Shawn "Source" Jarrett

Megan Thee Stallion singles chronology
"Strategy" (2024)	"Whenever" (2025)	"Lover Girl" (2025)

Music video
- "Whenever" on YouTube

"Whenever" is a song by Megan Thee Stallion. It was released on April 25, 2025, through Hot Girl Productions. It contains a sample of "It's Whatever" by Ms. Cherry.

== Background ==
After the success of her third album, Megan (2024) and its reissue, subtitled Act II (2024), Megan teased her fourth album in March 2025 and said that a single and music video is going be released in the future. On April 19, she announced that the release date of the single would be on April 25 and shared the cover art, depicting herself in three poses, two men with fish heads, and a chessboard.

== Music video ==
The music video was released alongside the single on her YouTube channel. The music video was directed by Zac Dov Wiesel. In the video, Megan crashes a car through a doctor's office and poses in the waiting room and the furniture in it, including inside a fish tank, on a chessboard, and on a desk.

== Charts ==
Chart performance for "Whenever"
Chart (2025)	Peak position
New Zealand Hot Singles (RMNZ)	22
US Bubbling Under Hot 100 (Billboard)	2
US Hot R&B/Hip-Hop Songs (Billboard)	24
