= Lover Girl (Megan Thee Stallion song) =

2025 single by Megan Thee Stallion

Single by Megan Thee Stallion
- Released: October 24, 2025
- Studio: Jungle City (New York)
- Genre: Hip-hop
- Length: 4:24
- Label: Hot Girl Productions
- Songwriters: Megan Pete; Brian Holiman; Hasan Matthews; Roger Dickerson; Jules Jackson; Brion James; Jacob Carnes; Albert Charbonneau
- Producer: Jacob Dior

Megan Thee Stallion singles chronology
"Whenever" (2025)	"Lover Girl" (2025)	"B.B.B." (Remix) (2026)

Music video
- "Lover Girl" on YouTube

"Lover Girl" is a song by American rapper Megan Thee Stallion, released as a single on October 24, 2025. Produced by Jacob Dior, it contains a samples of "Kissin' You" by Total and "Bounce It" by HaSizzle. The song is about her then-boyfriend, NBA player Klay Thompson.

== Background ==
Megan Thee Stallion first previewed the song on October 1, 2025 with a video of her dancing to the song in the studio, while wearing a crop top, camouflage cargo pants, tan boots and a trucker hat fur-lined with wool. She continued to tease the song on social media in the weeks leading up to its release.

== Composition and lyrics ==
The song is built on a samples of "Kissin' You" and "Bounce It". Lyrically, Megan Thee Stallion revolves around her love for her partner Klay Thompson, although she does not mention him by name. She opens with the chorus, in which she repeatedly calls him her "man" and "baby" and describes him to be "Dickin' me down, spoilin' me, drivin' me crazy". In the first verse, Megan praises him as she recalls when she found out he was serious about their relationship and compares him to other men; she raps that he calls her his "lady" instead of his "bitch", keeps his word, and focuses on her rather than seeking attention. Megan describes her enjoyment of their sexual activity in the next two verses; in the second verse, she references "Freaky Gurl" by Gucci Mane (including the lyrics about giving her number to her lover in exchange for oral sex) and the film Love Jones, and mentions she is from "Splash Town", a reference to Thompson being one half of the Splash Brothers. Megan hints at marriage in the third verse ("I'm the type of fine make a nigga run to that altar"), in which she also reminisces about the time that Thompson took her home to meet his mother. Megan makes kissing sounds throughout the song and chants in the refrain, "pop that pussy for your man".

== Critical reception ==
Tom Breihan of Stereogum described the production as "weird and spacious and dubby", and commented "Megan uses that beat to do Megan things. She's good at that."

== Music video ==
The music video was released alongside the single. It shows Megan Thee Stallion being flanked by four women in lingerie twerking in unison as part of a choreography. She also dances on the stem of a martini glass as if it were a stripper pole, uses a chair as her dance prop, and recreates the song's cover art, dressing as Cupid. The clip ends with a visual of the wolf growling in the darkness.

== Commercial performance ==
The song debouted at 38 on the Billboard Hot 100, becoming Megan Thee Stallion’s 22nd song to reach the top 40 and became the first rap song to reach the chart's top 40 after Kendrick Lamar and SZA’s "Luther" dropped out of the top 40 during the week of October 18, 2025 the chart was left without a rap song in the top 40 for the first time since the chart dated February 3, 1999.

== Charts ==
Chart performance for "Lover Girl"
Chart (2025–2026)	Peak position
New Zealand Hot Singles (RMNZ)	19
US Billboard Hot 100	38
US Hot R&B/Hip-Hop Songs (Billboard)	7
US Pop Airplay (Billboard)	38
US Rhythmic Airplay (Billboard)	2
