= This Is For (song) =

2025 single by Twice

Single by Twice

from the album This Is For
- Released: July 11, 2025
- Genre: Pop
- Length: 2:11
- Label: JYP; Republic
- Composers: Tayla Parx; Em Walcott; Gustav Landell; Stephen McGregor; Daoud Anthony
- Lyricists: Tayla Parx; Em Walcott

Twice singles chronology
| "Takedown" (2025) | "This Is For" (2025) | "Enemy" (2025) |

Music video
- "This Is For" on YouTube

"This Is For" is a song by the South Korean girl group Twice. It was released on July 11, 2025, through JYP Entertainment and Republic Records, as the lead single from their fourth Korean studio album, This Is For.

== Music and lyrics ==
"This Is For" is a pop song that is reminiscent of the early 2000s, with influences from 1980s electropop. It was composed by Tayla Parx, Em Walcott, Gustav Landell, Stephen McGregor and Daoud Anthony, with lyrics by Parx and Walcott. Jihyo revealed to Singles magazine that there were many candidates for the album's lead single and Twice had a lot of arguments with JYP Entertainment over the song choice. Twice fought for "This Is For" and it was ultimately chosen. The song begins with an empowering message: "This is for all my ladies who don't get hyped enough/ If you've been done wrong, this is your song so turn it up." In an interview with People, Jihyo said the song is a "message to people who really need cheering", with Nayeon adding that it "can make someone feel very positive again when they feel that their confidence is down". Crystal Bell, writing for W, described "This Is For" as "brash, bouncy, and unapologetically for the girls".

== Music video ==
On July 7, 2025, a music video teaser for "This Is For" was released. A second music video teaser was released on July 9. The full music video was released on July 11.

== Critical reception ==
Clash ranked "This Is For" second on their list of the "15 Biggest K-Pop Statements of 2025", with Natalia Kabenge writing that the song is "a resolute, unapologetic feminist anthem" that "cements [Twice's] status as a generational talent". Nicole Fell of The Hollywood Reporter ranked the song thirteenth out of "The 40 Best K-pop Songs of 2025", saying "the girl power anthem is exactly what we needed this year." Pyo Kyung-min of The Korea Times described "This Is For" as an "easy-listening pop anthem" that serves as a "continuation of the group's slow but steady shift into their 'grown woman' era", praising Twice's self-assurance and skill that comes from their ten years together as a group. The editors of Rolling Stone Korea named the song one of their 2025 "Songs of the Year".

== Accolades ==
Music program awards
| Program | Date | Ref. |
|---|---|---|
| M Countdown | August 7, 2025 | |

== Charts ==
=== Weekly charts ===
Weekly chart performance
| Chart (2025) | Peak position |
|---|---|
| Chile Anglo Airplay (Monitor Latino) | 14 |
| Global 200 (Billboard) | 38 |
| Hong Kong (Billboard) | 10 |
| Japan (Japan Hot 100) | 13 |
| Japan Combined Singles (Oricon) | 16 |
| Malaysia (IFPI) | 17 |
| Malaysia International (RIM) | 14 |
| New Zealand Hot Singles (RMNZ) | 16 |
| Philippines (Philippines Hot 100) | 20 |
| Singapore (RIAS) | 17 |
| South Korea (Circle) | 102 |
| Taiwan (Billboard) | 3 |
| Vietnam (Vietnam Hot 100) | 37 |

=== Monthly charts ===
Monthly chart performance
| Chart (2025) | Position |
|---|---|
| South Korea (Circle) | 136 |
