= Shoot (Firecracker) =

Single by Chaeyoung

from the album Lil Fantasy Vol. 1
- Language: English
- Released: September 12, 2025
- Length: 2:49
- Label: JYP
- Composers: Chaeyoung; Gliiico; Kona Rose Jackson; Kosumo Yamamoto; Slom
- Lyricists: Chaeyoung; Gliiico; Kona Rose Jackson; Kosumo Yamamoto; Sokodomo

Chaeyoung singles chronology
"Takedown" (2025)	"Shoot (Firecracker)" (2025)

Music video
- "Shoot (Firecracker)" on YouTube

"Shoot (Firecracker)" is a song by the South Korean singer Chaeyoung for her first studio album Lil Fantasy Vol. 1. It was released by JYP Entertainment on September 12, 2025.

== Background ==
JYP Entertainment confirmed Chaeyoung's solo debut on August 8, 2025, and posted a video of Chaeyoung working on the album on JYP's official social media channels. The clip features her meeting with Japanese pop band Gliiico and playing the piano. Chaeyoung is the fourth member of Twice to make her solo debut following Nayeon, Jihyo and Tzuyu.

== Composition ==
"Shoot (Firecracker)" was written, composed and arranged by Chaeyoung, Gliiico, Kona Rose Jackson and Kosumo Yamamoto with additional lyrics by Sokodomo and arrangement by Slom. The song is composed in the key C Minor and has 120 beats per minute and a running time of 2 minutes and 49 seconds.

== Music video ==
The music video sees Chaeyoung in a myriad of strange settings, including being sandwiched between a number of mattresses, frolicking through a garden that looks like something out of Alice In Wonderland and rooms with gigantic desserts. It was directed by Minjae Kim.

== Promotion ==
Chaeyoung only performed on three music programs the first being on September 12, on KBS' Music Bank, MBC's Show! Music Core on September 13. And SBS' Inkigayo on September 14.

== Charts ==
=== Weekly charts ===
Weekly chart performance for "Shoot (Firecracker)"
Chart (2025)	Peak positions
South Korea Download (Circle)	25

=== Monthly charts ===
Chart (September 2025)	Peak position
South Korea Download (Circle)	117

== Publication lists ==
Publication lists for "Shoot (Firecracker)"
Critic/Publication	List	Rank	Ref.
The Hollywood Reporter	The 40 Best K-Pop Songs of 2025	39	

== Release history ==
Release history for "Shoot (Firecracker)"
Region	Date	Format	Label
Various	September 12, 2025	Digital download; streaming	JYP; Republic
