= Lil Fantasy Vol. 1 =

2025 studio album by Chaeyoung

- Digital cover

Studio album by Chaeyoung
- Released: September 12, 2025
- Recorded: 2023–2025
- Genres: K-pop; R&B; neo soul; trip hop; dream pop; bedroom pop
- Length: 20:59
- Languages: Korean; English
- Labels: JYP; Republic
- Producers: Chaeyoung; Gliiico; Nico de Torres; Kai de Torres; Kona Rose Jackson; Kosumo Yamamoto; Slom; Gilhyeon Son; Beautiful Disco; PeeJay; Sumin; Valo; Junu Park

Singles from Lil Fantasy Vol. 1
- 1. "Shoot (Firecracker)" Released: September 12, 2025

Lil Fantasy Vol. 1 (stylized as LIL FANTASY vol.1) is the debut studio album by South Korean singer Chaeyoung of the girl group Twice. It was released on September 12, 2025, through JYP Entertainment and Republic Records. The album contains nine tracks, including the lead single "Shoot (Firecracker)" and collaborations with Japanese sibling band Gliiico, singer-songwriter and producer Sumin, and Jibin of South Korean hip-hop duo Y2K92. Chaeyoung is the fourth member of Twice to debut solo, following Nayeon, Jihyo, and Tzuyu.

The album is primarily a neo soul and R&B album with influences from other genres such as dream pop and bedroom pop. Songs such as "Shoot (Firecracker)" incorporate elements from jazz and disco while "Ribbons" takes influence from rock and EDM. Chaeyoung is credited as the sole lyricist of three songs on the album and as a co-lyricist on the remaining six tracks, and also has composition, arrangement, and production credits on most tracks. The lyrics of the album discuss topics such as self-acceptance, toxic relationships, and issues faced by women in the music industry.

Lil Fantasy Vol. 1 received generally positive reviews, with music critics praising the stylistic differences between the album and her work in Twice. American music magazine Billboard called the album the seventh-best K-pop album of 2025, and Rolling Stone included it in its list of the 100 best albums of 2025. The album also saw commercial success, debuting at number 3 on South Korea's Circle Album Chart, and also charting in several other countries, including Japan and the United States.

== Background ==
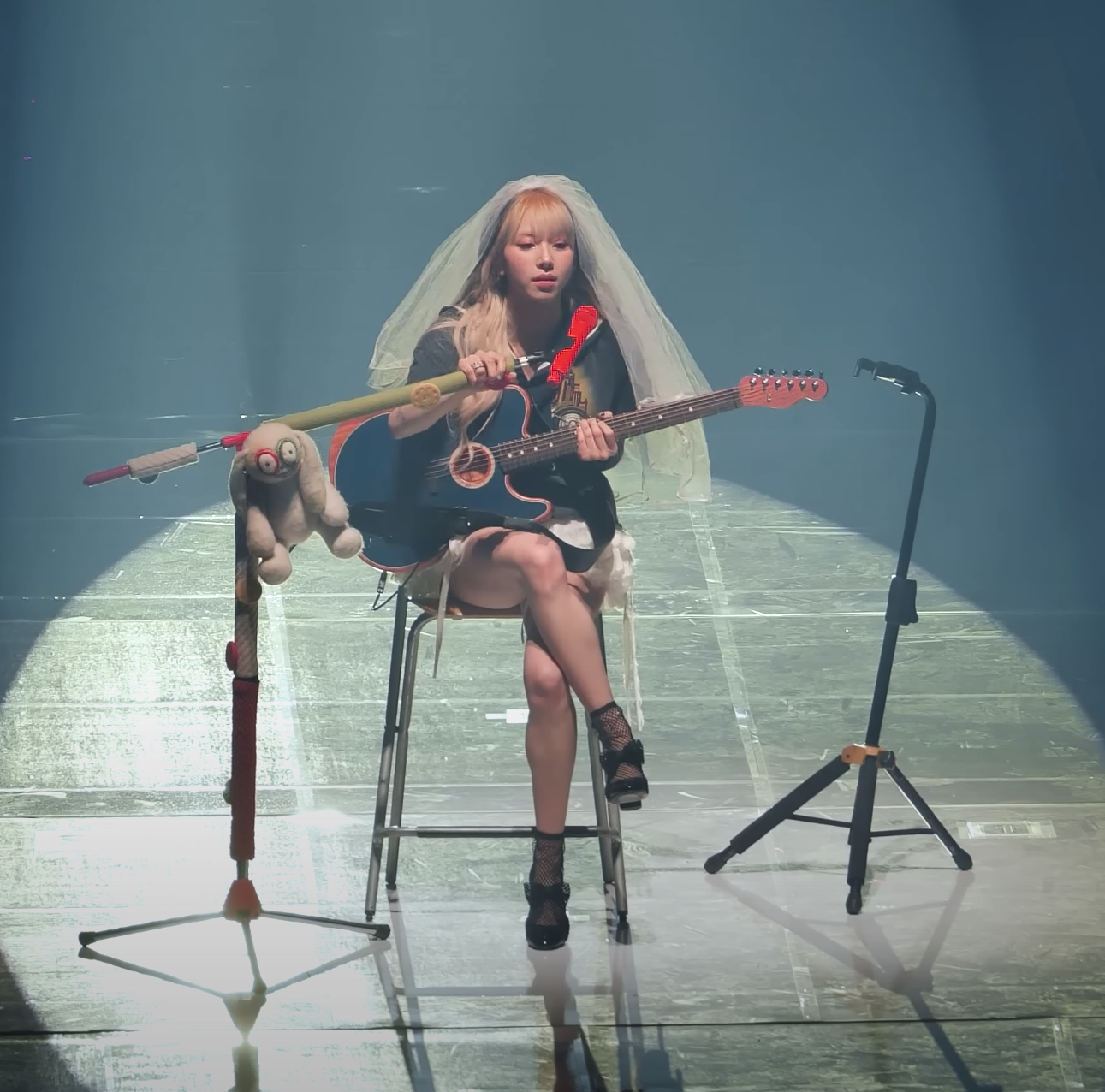
Chaeyoung performing "My Guitar" on the Ready to Be World Tour

Chaeyoung has previously been credited as a songwriter on several of Twice's works, including Signal, Twicetagram, What Is Love?, Feel Special, and Fancy You. Her artwork, inspired by the style of Tim Burton, has also been previously featured on a limited edition version of Twice's second extended play, Page Two, in 2016.

In December 2022, Chaeyoung discussed her potential solo debut in an interview with GQ Korea, stating that she wanted to show her "most natural self" in her first album, participating in the creation of every song. She began learning to play the guitar earlier that year, and then performed an unreleased solo track titled "My Guitar" on Twice's Ready to Be World Tour (2023–2024). In a March 2025 interview with Dazed Korea, Chaeyoung said she hoped her album would explain who she is. In September 2025, she told Rolling Stone that the project took two to three years in total. For the first two years, she focused on figuring out what she wanted the album to be and what kind of music she wanted to create, spending a lot of time developing her ideas before putting them into action. Chaeyoung also told Billboard Korea that the album spent "about a year" in production.

== Release and promotion ==
On June 10, 2025, JYP Entertainment confirmed that Chaeyoung was preparing for her solo debut. She is the fourth member of Twice to debut solo, following Nayeon, Jihyo and Tzuyu. On August 8, it was announced that Chaeyoung would release her debut album on September 12. The album's title, Lil Fantasy Vol. 1, was revealed on August 12. On September 1, a music video was released for album track "Avocado", featuring Japanese band Gliiico. On September 2, the album's track listing was revealed, showing that Chaeyoung is the sole lyricist for three songs and is a co-lyricist on the remaining six songs. She also has composition and arrangement credits on most of the tracks. Chaeyoung held an exclusive listening party the day before the release at Hannam House in Seoul in order to communicate with fans. On September 12, the album was released along with a music video for its lead single "Shoot (Firecracker)".

Chaeyoung performed on several South Korean music programs on the day of and shortly after the album's release. Her first televised appearance was a performance of "Shoot (Firecracker)" on KBS2's Music Bank on September 12. She also performed "Shoot (Firecracker)" on MBC's Show! Music Core and SBS's Inkigayo on September 13th and 14th respectively.

== Composition ==
In a statement released by JYP Entertainment, Chaeyoung said Lil Fantasy Vol. 1 "represents the little world within me, filled with my tastes, thoughts and attitude, offering a more authentic glimpse of who I am". The album features the Japanese sibling band Gliiico, whose neo soul and bedroom pop style shapes much of the sound. It also includes contributions from Sumin, Jibin of Y2K92, and rapper Sokodomo, who is credited with bringing an alternative and underground influence to the album's sound rather than mainstream pop.

The album opens with "Avocado", featuring Gliiico, who helped write and arrange the song. It was inspired by the story of Adam and Eve, with an avocado representing the forbidden fruit. The song's music video portrays Chaeyoung being eaten by an avocado and then falling into a fantasy world reminiscent of Alice in Wonderland. Luke Casey, the music video's director, had previously worked with artists such as Beabadoobee and Bladee. Chaeyoung chose "Avocado" as the first track because it "sets the mood for the entire album". "Band-Aid" is an R&B song with a "cute yet kind of melancholy" concept with lyrics about staying in a toxic relationship. The song was originally an instrumental track by Gliiico. "Shoot (Firecracker)" is a dance song influenced by jazz and disco, and its music video also references Alice in Wonderland. It was chosen as the lead single because it is danceable and contains the message "Let's set off firecrackers together and enjoy the party" with lyrics about self-acceptance. Chaeyoung called the recording process for "Shoot (Firecracker)" "really challenging" and said that it took about 12 hours to complete.

"Girl" is a guitar-driven song that Chaeyoung wrote for quiet girls like herself to empathize with. In an interview with Rolling Stone, she said "I 100 percent do think that the quiet girls are powerful girls with their thoughts and minds." "Ribbons" begins as an R&B ballad and then transforms into a bass-heavy mix of rock and EDM. Chaeyoung chose to collaborate with Sumin and Jibin of Y2K92 because she wanted a song that was made entirely by female artists. They all wrote part of the song on their own, and happened to all write about hardships they overcame as female artists. In an interview with Grammy, Chaeyoung recalled that "The three of us talked a lot because we are three female solo artists. Female solo artists are not common in Korea. There aren't a lot... So when the three of us got together, we talked about this issue of diversity a ton." "Downpour", a collaboration with Gliiico, is a dream pop song that was written during the downpour season in Japan. The lyrics of "Downpour" discuss how Chaeyoung used to allow herself to be treated by others and that she is no longer afraid of putting herself first.

Chaeyoung described "BF" and "Shadow Puppet" as "very personal songs". "BF" reflects on the "loneliness that affects everyone at times", and "Shadow Puppet" describes how she feels like a shadow puppet when she has to conceal her identity so she won't be recognized outside. When recording "Shadow Puppet", the lyrics "Will there be a time where I freely run around again. Will that time come again?" made her cry. The closing track, "My Guitar", is an acoustic ballad about unconditional love. It was the first song she wrote on her own for the album, and she first performed it on Twice's Ready to Be World Tour in 2023. "My Guitar" was originally meant to be exclusive to physical releases of the album, but was later included digitally because those who worked on it thought it would be "a waste" to not include it. "Lonely Doll Waltz" was included as a physical release-only instrumental track because it is one of the first songs that Chaeyoung created using Ableton Live and it "sums up the mood" of the album.

== Reception ==
Professional ratings
Review scores
Source	Rating
AllMusic	3.5/5 stars
IZM	3/5 stars

Marcy Donelson of AllMusic gave the album a score of 3.5 out of 5, stating that unlike Twice's bright and energising style, Chaeyoung "opts for a warm, shimmery smooth R&B with washes of bedroom pop bliss." Son Min-hyun of IZM gave the album a score of 3 out of 5, calling it "a line of imagination that is distinctly different" from Twice's music. The review goes on to say that "Chaeyoung has made a convincing work based on her personal tastes accumulated from experience and observation" and that its "intentional imperfections" and clear differences from Twice's musical style leave listeners curious about a sequel album.

Lil Fantasy Vol. 1 was ranked 86th in Rolling Stone's 100 best albums of 2025. Jae-Ha Kim wrote for Rolling Stone that "Yes, Chaeyoung is living her lil fantasy, but she makes it clear she’s a work in progress with room to grow." Sara Delgado of Teen Vogue stated that the album was worth the wait and selected it as one of the 15 best non-English albums of 2025, describing it as "a complete 180 from her work in Twice". The album appeared at number 7 in Billboard's staff list of the 25 best K-pop albums of 2025, with Billboard Korea saying that it "not only showcased her songwriting and composing across the entire record, but also solidified her stature as a true artist." Lil Fantasy Vol. 1 also appeared in Idology's list of the top 20 albums of 2025, and in a list of the 40 best K-pop songs of 2025, Nicole Fell of The Hollywood Reporter called Lil Fantasy Vol. 1 "perhaps the strongest Twice solo thus far."

Lil Fantasy Vol. 1 on year-end lists
Publication	List	Rank	Ref.
Billboard	The 25 Best K-pop Albums of 2025: Staff Picks	7th	
Idology	Top 20 Albums of 2025	Placed	
Rolling Stone	The 100 Best Albums of 2025	86th	
Teen Vogue	15 Best Non-English Albums of 2025	Placed	

=== Commercial performance ===
In South Korea, Lil Fantasy Vol.1 debuted at number 3 on the Circle Album Chart in its first week with 166,320 copies sold, while its Platform Nemo version ranked 24th with 7,672 copies sold. The album and the Platform Nemo version reached numbers 14 and 72 respectively on the Circle September Album Chart with 174,816 and 8,976 copies sold. In other countries, the album appeared on music charts in Croatia, France, Greece, Japan, Portugal, and the United States.

== Track listing ==
Track listing for Lil Fantasy Vol. 1
No.	Title	Lyrics	Music	Arrangement	Length
1.	"Avocado" (featuring Gliiico)	Chaeyoung; Gliiico; Sokodomo	Chaeyoung; Gliiico	Chaeyoung; Gliiico	2:21
2.	"Band-Aid"	Chaeyoung; Gliiico; Sokodomo	Chaeyoung; Gliiico	Chaeyoung; Gliiico; Junu Park; Gilhyeon Son	2:25
3.	"Shoot (Firecracker)"	Chaeyoung; Gliiico; Kona Rose Jackson; Kosumo Yamamoto; Sokodomo	Chaeyoung; Gliiico; Jackson; Yamamoto	Chaeyoung; Gliiico; Jackson; Yamamoto; Slom	2:48
4.	"Girl"	Chaeyoung; Gliiico	Chaeyoung; Gliiico	Chaeyoung; Gliiico	2:37
5.	"Ribbons" (featuring Sumin, Jibin of Y2K92)	Chaeyoung; Sumin; Jibin	Chaeyoung; Sumin; Jibin	Sumin	2:37
6.	"Downpour" (with Kai)	Chaeyoung; Gliiico	Chaeyoung; Gliiico	Chaeyoung; Gliiico	1:49
7.	"BF"	Chaeyoung; Sokodomo	Beautiful Disco	Beautiful Disco; Park; Son	1:31
8.	"Shadow Puppet" (그림자놀이; Geurimjanori)	Chaeyoung	Peejay; Chaeyoung	Peejay	2:27
9.	"My Guitar" (내 기타; Nae gita)	Chaeyoung	Chaeyoung; Park; Valo	Park; Valo	2:24
Total length:					20:59

Physical release-only bonus track
No.	Title	Music	Arrangement	Length
10.	"Lonely Doll Waltz"	Chaeyoung	Chaeyoung

== Credits and personnel ==
Credits adapted from Apple Music.

- Chaeyoung – vocals, background vocals, vocal director, vocal arranger (all tracks), producer (1–4, 6)
- Gliiico – vocals (tracks 1, 6), producer (tracks 1–3, 6)
- Nico de Torres – vocal director, all instruments (tracks 1–3), background vocals (tracks 1, 2), vocal arranger (tracks 1–3), producer (tracks 1–4, 6), recording (tracks 1–3, 6), editing engineer (tracks 1, 6)
- Kai de Torres – background vocals (tracks 1, 6), drums (track 1) producer, vocal director (track 6)
- Kona Rose Jackson – background vocals, producer (track 3)
- Kosumo Yamamoto – piano, synthesizer, guitar, producer (track 3)
- Slom – producer (track 3)
- Gilhyeon Son – synthesizer (tracks 2, 3, 7), producer (tracks 2, 7)
- Beautiful Disco – drums, bass, synthesizer, keyboards, guitar, all instruments, producer (track 7)
- PeeJay – drums, bass, piano, synthesizer, producer (track 8)
- Sumin – vocals, background vocals, drums, bass, vocal director, synthesizer, vocal arranger, producer, editing engineer, recording engineer (track 5)
- Jibin – vocals, background vocals, vocal arranger, vocal director, recording engineer (track 5)
- Valo – guitar, producer (track 9)
- Park Namjun – recording (tracks 4, 5, 6, 8)
- HRBstage – recording (track 7), mixing (track 5)
- kimsunkyu – recording (track 7)
- Kim Sangil – recording (track 9)
- Junu Park – bass, synthesizer, Rhodes piano, (track 9), producer (tracks 2, 3, 7, 9), recording (track 9), editing engineer (tracks 2, 3, 6, 7, 9), mixing engineer (tracks 2, 7, 9), mixing (tracks 2, 7, 9)
- James Fouren – mixing (tracks 1, 3, 4, 6), editing (tracks 1, 3, 4, 6), mastering (all tracks)
- Shin Bongwon – immersive mixing (all tracks)

== Charts ==
=== Weekly charts ===
Weekly chart performance for Lil Fantasy Vol. 1
Chart (2025)	Peak position
Croatian International Albums (HDU)	31
French Albums (SNEP)	134
Greek Albums (IFPI)	56
Japanese Albums (Oricon)	12
Japanese Combined Albums (Oricon)	13
Japanese Hot Albums (Billboard Japan)	74
Portuguese Albums (AFP)	114
South Korean Albums (Circle)	3
US Billboard 200	38
US World Albums (Billboard)	3

=== Monthly charts ===
Monthly chart performance for Lil Fantasy Vol. 1
Chart (2025)	Position
Japanese Albums (Oricon)	40
South Korean Albums (Circle)	14
