= Takedown (song) =

2025 song by Huntrix and Twice

Single by Twice

from the album KPop Demon Hunters
- Language: English; Korean
- Released: June 20, 2025
- Genre: K-pop
- Length: 3:01
- Label: Republic; Visva
- Songwriters: Lindgren; Melanie Fontana
- Producers: Lindgren; Ian Eisendrath

Twice singles chronology
"Strategy" (2024)	"Takedown" (2025)	"This Is For" (2025)

KPop Demon Hunters singles chronology
"Takedown" (2025)	"Golden" (2025)

Lyric video
- "Takedown" on YouTube

"Takedown"

Song by Huntrix

from the album KPop Demon Hunters
- Language: English; Korean
- Released: June 20, 2025
- Genre: K-pop
- Length: 3:02
- Label: Republic; Visva
- Songwriters: Lindgren; Melanie Fontana
- Producers: Lindgren; Ian Eisendrath

Audio video
- "Takedown" on YouTube

"Takedown" is a song from the 2025 animated musical fantasy film KPop Demon Hunters. Two versions of the song featured in the film: one performed by Ejae, Audrey Nuna, and Rei Ami as the fictional K-pop girl group Huntrix as well as an end credits version performed by Jeongyeon, Jihyo, and Chaeyoung of the real-life South Korean girl group Twice. The version recorded by Twice was released on June 20, 2025, through Republic Records, as the lead single from the film's soundtrack album. It was also included on the deluxe edition of Twice's fourth Korean studio album This Is For (2025). In the film, the song is interpreted as a "diss track" to Huntrix's rival boy band, the Saja Boys, to hint that they were demons to the public.

== Background and release ==
The animated musical fantasy film KPop Demon Hunters was released on Netflix on June 20, 2025. The film follows the fictional K-pop girl group Huntrix, consisting of members Rumi, Mira, and Zoey, whose singing voices are performed by Ejae, Audrey Nuna, and Rei Ami, respectively. "Takedown" is performed by Huntrix during the movie, while a remix by Twice members Jeongyeon, Jihyo, and Chaeyoung plays over the end credits alongside live-action footage of the cast and musical talent recording for the film. The film's accompanying soundtrack album was released on June 20, featuring both versions of the song. The Twice version of "Takedown" was released as the album's lead single on the same day. On June 27, a 7-inch vinyl for the song was released. In July 2025, "Takedown" was also released on the deluxe edition of Twice's fourth Korean studio album This Is For.

=== Live performances ===
Twice debuted the song live during their headlining set at Lollapalooza 2025. The performance was accompanied by a drone show that displayed the message "The honmoon is sealed", a reference to Huntrix's mission in KPop Demon Hunters. The song was also performed on the North American leg of Twice's This Is For World Tour.

== Lyrics and composition ==
Within the plot of KPop Demon Hunters, "Takedown" acts as a diss track written by the main characters against the Saja Boys, an antagonistic demon boy band. The soundtrack album's executive music producer Ian Eisendrath, when discussing the song, explained that "[Huntrix are] writing a song that is going to express their rage, their vengeance ... The idea of 'Takedown' is this diss track that is going to scare away, intimidate, and drive away the demons." The song additionally serves in the film to further the internal struggles of the character Rumi, who is secretly half-demon. The song was written and recorded as a standalone record before being incorporated into the film.

Eisendrath shared that getting a co-sign from real-life K-pop artists Jeongyeon, Jihyo, and Chaeyoung of Twice lent the project "much-needed street cred" among K-pop fans, stating "to have the real thing authenticate it gave me faith in what we were doing – that they were interested, that they were willing." The end credits version of "Takedown" by Jeongyeon, Jihyo, and Chaeyoung serves as the centerpiece of their TikTok dance challenge. Chaeyoung initially felt the song was too intense for them to pull off but ended up enjoying working on a new style, while Jeongyeon noted that it was a "special experience" as the trio's first song together on their own.

== Critical reception ==
Debashree Dutta of Rolling Stone India praised the song's "marked ferocity" as it reveals Huntrix's fury against the Saja Boys which culminates in a chorus reiterating their desire to take the demons down. Sarah Carey of That Hashtag Show described it as "pure adrenaline", both in the "aggressive" Huntrix version and the "polished" Twice version. She noted that the song "proves that you can craft a high-energy hit and deliver real emotional weight", delivering both a strong message alongside "beat drops and power vocals." Crystal Bell of Mashable expressed that "Golden" and "Takedown" would not "feel out of place on a real idol group's comeback album, with propulsive beats, dynamic hooks, and lyrics that tap into both the emotional highs and warrior-like tenacity of being an idol." Similarly, Trent Cannon of PopVerse described "Takedown" as fast and aggressive and opined that it leans on "hip-hop influences" common throughout K-pop and "wouldn't feel out of place on a Twice record itself."

== Track listing ==
7-inch vinyl single

1. "Takedown" (Twice version) – 3:01
2. "Takedown" (Huntrix version) – 3:02

== Personnel ==
Credits adapted from Apple Music.

=== Twice version ===
- Jeongyeon, Jihyo, Chaeyoung – vocals
- Ian Eisendrath – string conductor, strings, vocal arranger, producer, recording engineer, strings engineer
- Hilary Skewes – strings
- Andrew Dudman – vocal director, vocal arranger, recording engineer
- Melanie Fontana – songwriter
- Lindgren – songwriter, producer
- Rob Mathes – string arranger
- Ejae – vocal arranger
- Kay One – editing engineer, recording engineer
- Hyejin Choi – recording engineer
- Lee Taesub – mixing engineer
- Kwon Nam-woo – mastering engineer
- Derik Lee – vocal recording engineer
- Curtis Douglas – vocal mixing engineer
- Giovanni "Blu" Rottier – immersive mixing engineer

=== Huntrix version ===
- Ejae – vocals, vocal arranger
- Audrey Nuna – vocals
- Rei Ami – vocals
- Ian Eisendrath – string conductor, vocal arranger, producer
- Melanie Fontana – songwriter
- Lindgren – songwriter, producer
- Rob Mathes – string arranger
- Kay One – editing engineer
- Andy Dudman – strings engineer
- Hyejin Choi – recording engineer
- Curtis Douglas – mixing engineer, vocal mixing engineer
- Kwon Nam-woo – mastering engineer
- Derik Lee – vocal recording engineer
- Giovanni "Blu" Rottier – immersive mixing engineer

== Charts ==
=== Weekly charts ===
By Huntrix
Chart (2025–2026)	Peak position
Australia (ARIA)	11
Austria (Ö3 Austria Top 40)	25
Canada Hot 100 (Billboard)	25
Czech Republic Singles Digital (ČNS IFPI)	54
France (SNEP)	167
France Airplay (SNEP)	15
Germany (GfK)	14
Global 200 (Billboard)	11
Greece International (IFPI)	57
Iceland (Tónlistinn)	27
Ireland (IRMA)	27
Israel (Mako Hitlist)	92
Lithuania (AGATA)	95
Malaysia (IFPI)	18
Malaysia International (RIM)	13
Netherlands (Single Top 100)	80
New Zealand (Recorded Music NZ)	12
Norway (IFPI Norge)	22
Philippines (Philippines Hot 100)	24
Poland (Polish Streaming Top 100)	47
Portugal (AFP)	110
Singapore (RIAS)	13
Slovakia Singles Digital (ČNS IFPI)	45
South Korea (Circle)	31
Sweden (Sverigetopplistan)	22
Taiwan (Billboard)	18
UK Singles (Official Charts)	67
US Billboard Hot 100	21
US Hot Dance/Pop Songs (Billboard)	2
Vietnam Hot 100 (Billboard)	70

By Twice
Chart (2025)	Peak position
Australia (ARIA)	28
Canada (Canadian Hot 100)	45
Global 200 (Billboard)	30
Ireland (IRMA)	40
Israel (Mako Hitlist)	95
Malaysia (Billboard)	23
Malaysia International (RIM)	18
New Zealand (Recorded Music NZ)	29
Norway (IFPI Norge)	74
Philippines (Philippines Hot 100)	32
Singapore (RIAS)	22
South Korea (Circle)	38
Sweden (Sverigetopplistan)	100
Taiwan (Billboard)	15
UK Singles (Official Charts)	24
US Billboard Hot 100	50

=== Monthly charts ===
By Huntrix
Chart (2025)	Peak position
South Korea (Circle)	32

By Twice
Chart (2025)	Peak position
South Korea (Circle)	41

=== Year-end charts ===
By Huntrix
Chart (2025)	Position
Australia (ARIA)	75
Canada (Canadian Hot 100)	70
Germany (GfK)	76
Global 200 (Billboard)	142
South Korea (Circle)	159
US Billboard Hot 100	93
US Hot Dance/Pop Songs (Billboard)	4

By Twice
Chart (2025)	Position
South Korea (Circle)	174

== Certifications ==
By Huntrix
Region	Certification	Certified units/sales
Australia (ARIA)	Platinum	70,000^{‡}
Belgium (BRMA)	Gold	20,000^{‡}
Brazil (Pro-Música Brasil)	2× Platinum	80,000^{‡}
Canada (Music Canada)	2× Platinum	160,000^{‡}
France (SNEP)	Gold	100,000^{‡}
Mexico (AMPROFON)	Gold	70,000^{‡}
New Zealand (RMNZ)	Platinum	30,000^{‡}
Poland (ZPAV)	Gold	62,500^{‡}
Spain (Promusicae)	Gold	50,000^{‡}
United Kingdom (BPI)	Platinum	600,000^{‡}
^{‡} Sales+streaming figures based on certification alone.

By Twice
Region	Certification	Certified units/sales
Brazil (Pro-Música Brasil)	Platinum	40,000^{‡}
New Zealand (RMNZ)	Gold	15,000^{‡}
United Kingdom (BPI)	Silver	200,000^{‡}
^{‡} Sales+streaming figures based on certification alone.

== Release history ==
Release dates and formats
Region	Date	Format	Label	Ref.
Various	June 20, 2025	Digital download; streaming	Republic	
Various	June 27, 2025	7-inch vinyl	Republic	
