= Enemy (Twice album) =

2025 studio album by Twice

- Digital cover

Studio album by Twice
- Released: August 27, 2025
- Genres: K-Pop; Pop rock; Contemporary R&B; J-Pop
- Length: 26:15
- Languages: Japanese; English
- Label: Warner Music Japan

Twice chronology
This Is For (2025)	Enemy (2025)	Ten: The Story Goes On (2025)

Singles from Enemy
- 1. "Enemy" Released: July 30, 2025; 2. "Like 1" Released: August 20, 2025

Enemy is the sixth Japanese studio album (tenth overall) by South Korean girl group Twice. It was released on August 27, 2025, by Warner Music Japan. The album features nine tracks, including the lead single of the same name. It also includes "The Wish", which was previously released as a digital single on December 16, 2024, and was featured in a FamilyMart television commercial.

== Background and release ==
On June 11, 2025, Twice announced that they would release their sixth Japanese studio album, Enemy, on August 27. A cinematic album trailer was released on July 22. It was narrated by member Jihyo, who also served as visual director. Before the album's release, Twice performed "Enemy" and "Like 1" during their This Is For World Tour in Osaka on July 26–27. The lead single, "Enemy", was released as a digital single on July 30, along with its music video. "Like 1" was released as a digital single on August 20, accompanied by an animated music video.

== Commercial performance ==
Enemy topped the Billboard Japan Hot Albums chart, recording 836 downloads and 118,853 copies sold from August 25–31, 2025. It also debuted at number 2 on the weekly ranking of the Oricon Albums Chart with 114,206 copies sold. On September 22, Billboard Japan reported that the album had sold a total of 163,745 copies. In October, it was certified Platinum by the RIAJ – Twice's first album to be certified Platinum since &Twice in 2020.

Enemy was released in the United States in December 2025 and subsequently debuted on the Billboard World Albums chart at number 23, Twice's first Japanese album to do so.

== Track listing ==
Track listing for Enemy
No.	Title	Lyrics	Music	Arrangement	Length
1.	"Up to You"	Dahyun; Chiaki Nagasawa; Saori Nagano; Takahito Nakamura	Nagasawa; Nagano; Nakamura	Nakamura	2:58
2.	"Enemy"	Masami Kakinuma; Rizin (153/Joombas); Jiwon (153/Joombas); Imlay	Imlay; Benji Bae; Carmen Reece	Imlay	2:41
3.	"Fine"	Mayu Wakisaka	Arineh Karimi; Nermin Harambašić; Moonshine	Moonshine	3:00
4.	"One Day"	Hiyori Nara	Charlotte Wilson; Emily Vaughn	Kkannu; BaZooKa; MarkAlong	3:11
5.	"Blind in Love"	Nara	Ronny Svendsen; Adrian Thesen; Moa "Cazzi Opeia" Carlebecker; Ellen Berg	Svendsen; Pizzapunk	2:43
6.	"Love Is More"	Kakinuma	Simon Gitsels; Violetta Zironi	Gitsels	2:55
7.	"The Wish"	Rose Blueming	Jon Hällgren; Julia Sundberg	Hällgren	2:47
8.	"Glow"	Dahyun; Nara; Val Del Prete	Del Prete; I.vin	I.vin	2:54
9.	"Like 1"	Jihyo; Sofia Vivere; Yu-ki Kokubo	Taka; Toru	Lucky West	3:06
Total length:					26:15

First press limited edition A DVD
No.	Title	Length
1.	"The Wish" (Making Movie)
2.	"Enemy" (Jacket Shooting Making Movie)
3.	"Enemy" (Jacket Member Making Video)
4.	"Enemy" (Music Video Making Movie)

== Charts ==
=== Weekly charts ===
Weekly chart performance for Enemy
Chart (2025)	Peak position
Japanese Albums (Oricon)	2
Japanese Combined Albums (Oricon)	2
Japanese Hot Albums (Billboard Japan)	1
US World Albums (Billboard)	23

=== Monthly charts ===
Monthly chart performance for Enemy
Chart (2025)	Position
Japanese Albums (Oricon)	2

=== Year-end charts ===
Year-end chart performance for Enemy
Chart (2025)	Position
Japanese Albums (Oricon)	38
Japanese Top Albums Sales (Billboard Japan)	40

== Certifications ==
Certifications for Enemy
Region	Certification	Certified units/sales
Japan (RIAJ) Physical	Platinum	250,000^{^}
^{^} Shipments figures based on certification alone.
