= With You-th =

2024 extended play by Twice

- Digital cover

EP by Twice
- Released: February 23, 2024
- Length: 17:31
- Languages: Korean; English
- Labels: JYP; Republic
- Producers: Dwilly; Earattack; Lee Woo-hyun; Cutfather; Carl Altino; Lee Woo-min "Collapsedone"; Lindgren; Jeoff Harris

Twice chronology
The Remixes (2023)	With You-th (2024)	Dive (2024)

Singles from With You-th
- 1. "I Got You" Released: February 2, 2024; 2. "One Spark" Released: February 23, 2024

With You-th (stylized as With YOU-th) is the thirteenth extended play by South Korean girl group Twice. It was released on February 23, 2024, through JYP Entertainment and Republic Records. The EP consists of six tracks, including the group's third original English-language single "I Got You" and the lead single "One Spark". It peaked atop the Billboard 200 and at number two on the South Korean Circle Album Chart.

== Background ==
In 2023, Twice released their twelfth EP, Ready to Be, on March 10. The album was commercially successful, becoming their best-selling album to date with over 1.7 million pre-order sales. To promote the EP, they embarked on the Ready to Be World Tour, which started on April 15–16 with a two-day concert in Seoul. On November 22, they released their first remix album titled The Remixes, consisting of English-language versions of seven of their songs.

On December 5, 2023, Twice posted a surprise teaser on their social media accounts, hinting at activities in spring 2024, featuring the texts "Our youth is here and now" and "ONCE MORE, Our splendid moments are about to unveil". On December 14, they announced the pre-release single "I Got You", their third original English-language single. The following month, on January 3, 2024, a mood film was uploaded to Twice's YouTube account, revealing the EP's title and the release dates for both the EP and the pre-release single. Later in the month, they uploaded an opening trailer and then a music video teaser for "I Got You", both on YouTube, as well as concept photos. The single was released on February 2, 2024. The music video for the song depicts the members dancing on the beach and traveling in a boat, facing turbulent seas as a representation of the group's unity amidst challenges. The tracklist for the album was revealed on February 10.

== Composition ==
I think this album is a collection of things that represent our youth, the friendship and special bond that glues together nine of us and that only Twice can show.

— Chaeyoung, Reuters

"I Got You" was written by Jonah Morais, Daniel Seavey (both members of the American boy band Why Don't We), David "Dwilly" Wilson, Jake Torrey and Lexxi Saal, with production handled by Dwilly. A synth-pop song, it describes the friendship and love between the group's members, with the message of "even during difficult situations, I was always happy because of 'you' and we will overcome those hardships 'together' as always". "One Spark", a drum and bass song, was originally recorded for one of Twice's previous albums. When it was selected as the lead single of With You-th, the song was re-arranged and re-recorded. Chaeyoung was inspired by PinkPantheress while writing the lyrics for "Rush", a drum and bass song about "approaching something or someone". "Bloom" was written by Jeongyeon, and was originally considered for inclusion as a side track on Jihyo's solo album Zone (2023), but was ultimately passed over and later reworked as a song for the full group. "You Get Me", a dance-pop song with lyrics written by Dahyun, has the meaning of "understanding one another without having to explicitly say something".

== Promotion ==
To promote the EP, Twice performed "I Got You" and "One Spark" on the American morning television show Today, on February 23. The following week, both songs were performed on the South Korean music programs M Countdown, Music Bank, Show! Music Core, and Inkigayo. On March 12, they appeared on Dingo Music's YouTube series Killing Voice and performed a 30-minute-long medley of their hit songs, including full performances of "I Got You" and "One Spark".

== Critical reception ==
Professional ratings
Review scores
Source	Rating
NME	4/5 stars

In his review for NME, Tanu I. Raj highlighted Twice's evolution as a pop powerhouse, noting their ability to craft uplifting narratives while embracing musical complexity. He noted that throughout their journey, Twice has remained committed to personal growth and fostering a deep connection with their fanbase. He also noted that as they approach a decade in the industry, "it feels right to go back to their roots and reaffirm that bond", with tracks like "I Got You" serving as a testament to the enduring relationship between Twice and their supporters. David Crone of AllMusic called the album "one of [Twice's] most cohesive efforts to date", and praised the vocals and production on the album's B-side tracks.

== Commercial performance ==
In South Korea, With You-th debuted at number two on the Circle Album Chart for the week ending February 24, 2024. It topped the monthly chart, selling over one million copies, and was subsequently certified Million by the Korea Music Content Association.

In the United States, the EP topped the Billboard 200 chart with 95,000 album-equivalent units, including 90,000 physical album sales, as reported by music data tracking firm Luminate. It claimed the top-selling spot for the week ending February 29, marking the highest sales week of the year thus far. It is Twice's fifth top-10 record and the third album by a K-pop girl group to reach number 1, following Blackpink's Born Pink (2022) and NewJeans's Get Up (2023).

== Accolades ==
=== Listicles ===
Name of publisher, year listed, name of listicle, and placement
Publisher	Year	Listicle	Placement	Ref.
Billboard	2024	The 20 Best K-Pop Albums of 2024 (So Far): Staff Picks	3rd	
Billboard	2024	The 25 Best K-Pop Albums of 2024 : Staff Picks	3rd	

== Track listing ==
With You-th track listing
No.	Title	Lyrics	Music	Arrangement	Length
1.	"I Got You"	Jonah Marais; Daniel Seavey; David Wilson; Jake Torrey; Lexxi Saal	Jonah Marais; Daniel Seavey; David Wilson; Jake Torrey; Lexxi Saal	Dwilly	2:53
2.	"One Spark"	Sim Eunjee; Melanie Fontana	Kyler Niko; Earattack; Paulina "Pau" Cerrilla; Lee Woo-hyun	Earattack; Lee Woo-hyun	3:03
3.	"Rush"	Chaeyoung	Mich Hansen; Chris Burton; Carl Wallevik	Cutfather; Carl Altino	2:36
4.	"New New"	Lee Seu Ran	Lee Woo-min "Collapsedone"; Paulina "Pau" Cerrilla; Kyler Niko	Lee Woo-min "Collapsedone"	3:01
5.	"Bloom"	Jeongyeon	Melanie Fontana; Earattack; Lindgren; GG Ramirez; Lee Woo-hyun	Earattack; Lindgren; Lee Woo-hyun	3:23
6.	"You Get Me"	Dahyun	Brooke Tomlinson; Sofia Kay; Jeoff Harris	Jeoff Harris	2:33
Total length:					17:31

== Charts ==
=== Weekly charts ===
Weekly chart performance for With You-th
Chart (2024)	Peak position
Australian Physical Albums (ARIA)	64
Austrian Albums (Ö3 Austria)	7
Belgian Albums (Ultratop Flanders)	31
Belgian Albums (Ultratop Wallonia)	23
Croatian International Albums (HDU)	3
French Albums (SNEP)	15
German Albums (Offizielle Top 100)	11
Greek Albums (IFPI)	7
Hungarian Albums (MAHASZ)	32
Japanese Albums (Oricon)	4
Japanese Combined Albums (Oricon)	3
Japanese Hot Albums (Billboard Japan)	11
New Zealand Albums (RMNZ)	32
Spanish Albums (Promusicae)	37
South Korean Albums (Circle)	2
Swedish Physical Albums (Sverigetopplistan)	13
Swiss Albums (Schweizer Hitparade)	19
UK Album Downloads (Official Charts)	17
US Billboard 200	1
US World Albums (Billboard)	1

=== Monthly charts ===
Monthly chart performance for With You-th
Chart (2024)	Position
Japanese Albums (Oricon)	9
South Korean Albums (Circle)	1

=== Year-end charts ===
Year-end chart performance for With You-th
Chart (2024)	Position
Japanese Albums (Oricon)	68
Japanese Download Albums (Billboard Japan)	60
South Korean Albums (Circle)	17
US Top Album Sales (Billboard)	30
US World Albums (Billboard)	15

== Certifications and sales ==
Certifications and sales for With You-th
Region	Certification	Certified units/sales
South Korea (KMCA)	Million	1,000,000^{^}
United States	—	174,000
^{^} Shipments figures based on certification alone.
