= One Spark (song) =

2024 song by Twice

Single by Twice

from the EP With You-th
- Language: Korean
- Released: February 23, 2024
- Studio: JYP Studios
- Genre: Drum and bass
- Length: 3:03
- Label: JYP; Republic
- Composers: Kyler Niko; Earattack; Paulina "Pau" Cerrilla; Lee Woo-hyun
- Lyricists: Sim Eunjee; Melanie Fontana
- Producers: Earattack; Lee Woo-hyun

Twice singles chronology
"I Got You" (2024)	"One Spark" (2024)	"Dive" (2024)

Music video
- "One Spark" on YouTube

"One Spark" is a song recorded by South Korean girl group Twice. It was released as the lead single of their thirteenth extended play, With You-th, on February 23, 2024. It was written by Kyler Niko, Earattack, Paulina "Pau" Cerrilla, Lee Woo-hyun, Sim Eunjee and Melanie Fontana.

"One Spark" peaked at number 93 on the Billboard Global 200 and number 126 on South Korea's Circle Digital Chart. It also entered charts in Hong Kong, Japan, Malaysia, and Singapore, and the top ten in Taiwan.

== Background and release ==
On December 14, 2023, Twice announced they would release a single titled "I Got You". On January 3, 2024, it was revealed that "I Got You" would serve as a pre-release single for the group's thirteenth EP, With You-th. The single and its accompanying music video were released on February 2, 2024. Twice unveiled two music video teasers for "One Spark", which they announced as the lead single for the EP, on February 21, 2024. The single and music video were released simultaneously with the EP on February 23, 2024. A "One Spark" remix EP, including an English version of the song, was released on February 26. Korean and Japanese versions of "One Spark" were included in the group's fifth compilation album #Twice5, released on May 14, 2025.

== Composition ==
"One Spark" is a drum and bass track that draws inspiration from the bubblegum pop style of the group's earlier tracks such as "Cheer Up" and "TT." The single combines modern breakbeats and dance-inspiring rhythms, while its lyrics focus on "embracing the burning heart of youth". It was originally recorded for one of Twice's previous albums, but did not make the cut. When it was selected as the lead single of With You-th, the song was re-arranged and re-recorded.

== Music video ==
A scene in the music video where Twice is dancing on Chuncheon Bridge.

The music video primarily highlights the group's choreography, showcasing their performance on multiple sets ranging from a "luxurious" dining hall to a minimalist white soundstage. An elevator with floor numbers representing time passing between their debut date as a group and the release date for their song "One Spark" is intermittently featured throughout the video. In one set, group member Dahyun is also seen crying in a dance studio and being comforted by other members, which depicts the hardships the group went through during their past as Korean idol trainees. The video concludes with the K-pop act dancing on Chuncheon Bridge, which was closed to traffic for filming, as fireworks illuminate the scene.

== Track listing ==
- Digital download and streaming – Digital EP
1. "One Spark" (English version) – 3:03
2. "One Spark" (house version) – 2:44
3. "One Spark" (R&B version) – 3:04
4. "One Spark" (tropical version) – 2:52
5. "One Spark" (rave version) – 3:07
6. "One Spark" (instrumental) – 2:58

== Credits and personnel ==
Recording

- Recorded at JYPE Studios (Seoul)
- Mixed at Henson Studios (Hollywood, California)
- Mastered at Sterling Sound (Edgewater, New Jersey)
- Mixed for Dolby Atmos at GLab Studios (Seoul)

Personnel

- Twice – vocals
- Paulina Cerrilla – background vocals, composition
- Kyler Niko – composition
- Sim Eun-jee – lyricist
- Melanie Fontana – lyricist
- Earattack – composition, arrangement, all instruments, vocal director, recording engineer
- Lee Woo-hyeon – composition, arrangement, all instruments
- Kim Jong-sung – guitar
- Gu Hye-jin – recording engineer
- Lim Chan-mi – recording engineer
- Seo Eun-il – recording engineer
- KayOne (Lee Kyung-won) – digital editing
- Josh Gudwin – mixing engineer
- Lee Tae-seop – mixing engineer (vinyl version)
- Shin Bong-won – mixing engineer (Dolby Atmos)
- Felix Byrne – assistant mixing engineer
- Park Nam-jun – assistant mixing engineer (Dolby Atmos)
- Chris Gehringer – mastering engineer

== Charts ==
=== Weekly charts ===
Weekly chart performance for "One Spark"
Chart (2024)	Peak position
Global 200 (Billboard)	93
Hong Kong (Billboard)	23
Japan Hot 100 (Billboard)	18
Japan Combined Singles (Oricon)	29
Malaysia (Billboard)	22
Malaysia International (RIM)	15
New Zealand Hot Singles (RMNZ)	27
Singapore (RIAS)	23
South Korea (Circle)	126
Taiwan (Billboard)	2
UK Singles Downloads (Official Charts)	30
UK Singles Sales (OCC)	32
US World Digital Song Sales (Billboard)	3

=== Monthly charts ===
Monthly chart performance for "One Spark"
Chart (2024)	Position
South Korea (Circle)	143

== Certifications ==
Streaming certifications for "One Spark"
Region	Certification	Certified units/sales
Japan (RIAJ)	Gold	50,000,000^{†}
^{†} Streaming-only figures based on certification alone.

== Release history ==
Release dates and formats for "One Spark"
Region	Date	Format(s)	Version	Label	Ref.
Various	February 23, 2024	Digital download; streaming	Original	JYP; Republic	
Various	February 26, 2024	Digital download; streaming	Digital EP	JYP; Republic	
