= I Got You (Twice song) =

2024 song by Twice

Single by Twice

from the EP With You-th
- Released: February 2, 2024
- Studio: JYPE Studios (Seoul)
- Genre: Synth-pop
- Length: 2:53
- Label: JYP; Republic
- Songwriters: Jonah Marais; Daniel Seavey; David Wilson; Jake Torrey; Lexxi Saal
- Producer: Dwilly

Twice singles chronology
"Hare Hare" (2023)	"I Got You" (2024)	"One Spark" (2024)

Twice English singles chronology
"Moonlight Sunrise" (2023)	"I Got You" (2024)	"Strategy" (2024)

Music video
- "I Got You" on YouTube

"I Got You" is a song by South Korean girl group Twice. It was released as their third original English-language single on February 2, 2024, through JYP Entertainment and Republic Records. It serves as a pre-release single of the group's thirteenth extended play, With You-th. It is a synth-pop track, driven by a new wave-style beat, evoking a double-time production. The song was described as depicting the group's friendship and love, with the message of overcoming difficult times.

"I Got You" peaked at number 38 on the Billboard Global 200 and entered the top ten in Malaysia, Singapore, and Taiwan. Although the song did not enter South Korea's Circle Digital Chart, it peaked at number 16 on the component download chart.

== Critical reception ==
Professional ratings
Review scores
Source	Rating
IZM	2.5/5 stars

== Background and release ==
On December 14, 2023, Twice announced they would release a single titled "I Got You" on February 2, 2024. On January 3, 2024, it was revealed that "I Got You" serves as a pre-release single for the group's thirteenth EP, With You-th, scheduled for release on February 23. The single and its accompanying music video were released on February 2. A remix collection titled "I Got You" (Voyage version), including a version featuring Lauv, was released on February 5.

== Music and lyrics ==
"I Got You" is a synth-pop song written by Jonah Marais, Daniel Seavey, David Wilson, Jake Torrey and Lexxi Saal. Billboard's Gil Kaufman described the song as featuring a "bubbly new wave-style beat reminiscent of a double-time homage to A-Ha's 1985 classic 'Take On Me'". In terms of musical notation, the song was composed in the key of G-sharp major and has a tempo of 176 beats per minute.

According to JYP Entertainment, the song depicts the group's friendship and love, with the message of "even during difficult situations, I was always happy because of 'you' and we will overcome those hardships 'together' as always". The members express unwavering support for each other with lyrics like, "No matter what, you got me, I got you. We'll make it through, just like we always do."

== Music video ==
The accompanying music video was partially filmed on location in Geoje and Busan. It opens with a shot of a stormy sea, before panning to Mina inside the cabin of a yacht. She then joins the other members lying on cozy pillows on the floor, in contrast to the turbulence outside. In the next scene, the waves turn placid and they are led to shore by Jeongyeon in a lighthouse. The rest of the video is filled with scenes of the members dancing, holding hands in golden fields, and making promises with pinky swears, in line with the lyrics "No we'll never fall apart/ Even million miles apart/ We were lightning from the start". The video also includes an animated section where they dive under the waves during a storm, joining hands with the red string of fate. The video ends with the singers emerging from the cabin to enjoy the sunlight.

== Track listing ==
- CD single, digital download and streaming
1. "I Got You" – 2:53
2. "I Got You" (instrumental) – 2:53
- Digital download and streaming – Voyage version
1. "I Got You" (featuring Lauv) – 3:04
2. "I Got You" (original version) – 2:53
3. "I Got You" (lo-fi version) – 3:10
4. "I Got You" (hyper version) – 2:39
5. "I Got You" (garage version) – 3:10
6. "I Got You" (sped up version) – 2:36
7. "I Got You" (featuring Lauv; instrumental) – 3:04
8. "I Got You" (original version; instrumental) – 2:53
9. "I Got You" (lo-fi version; instrumental) – 3:10
10. "I Got You" (hyper version; instrumental) – 2:39
11. "I Got You" (garage version; instrumental) – 3:10
12. "I Got You" (sped up version; instrumental) – 2:36

== Credits and personnel ==
Recording

- Recorded at JYPE Studios (Seoul)
- Mixed at Klang Studio (Seoul)
- Mastered at 821 Sound Mastering (Seoul)
- Mixed for Dolby Atmos at GLab Studios (Seoul)

Personnel

- Twice – vocals
- Jonah Marais – songwriter
- Daniel Seavey – songwriter
- David Wilson – songwriter
- Jake Torrey – songwriter
- Lexxi Saal – songwriter
- Dwilly – arrangement
- Sophia Pae – background vocals, vocal director
- Earattack – vocal director
- KayOne – digital editing
- Eom Se-hee – recording
- Jay-P Gu – mixing
- Hong Jang-mi – mix engineering
- Kwon Nam-woo – mastering
- Shin Bong-won – Dolby Atmos mixing
  - Park Nam-joon – assistant

== Charts ==
Chart performance for "I Got You"
Chart (2024)	Peak position
Canada Hot 100 (Billboard)	96
Global 200 (Billboard)	38
Hong Kong (Billboard)	18
Japan Hot 100 (Billboard)	23
Japan Combined Singles (Oricon)	27
Malaysia (Billboard)	11
Malaysia International (RIM)	7
New Zealand Hot Singles (RMNZ)	31
Philippines (Billboard)	17
Singapore (RIAS)	10
South Korea BGM (Circle)	80
South Korea Download (Circle)	16
Taiwan (Billboard)	2
UK Singles Downloads (Official Charts)	11
UK Singles Sales (OCC)	12
US Digital Song Sales (Billboard)	24

== Release history ==
Release dates and formats for "I Got You"
Region	Date	Format(s)	Version	Label	Ref.
Various	February 2, 2024	Digital download; streaming	Original	JYP; Republic	
United States	February 2, 2024	CD single	Original	JYP; Republic	
Various	February 5, 2024	Digital download	Voyage	JYP; Republic	
Various	February 6, 2024	Streaming	Voyage	JYP; Republic	
