= Strategy (song) =

- Strategy 2.0 cover

Single by Twice featuring Megan Thee Stallion

from the EP Strategy
- Released: December 6, 2024
- Recorded: 2024
- Studio: JYPE (Seoul); Criteria (Miami)
- Genre: Pop; R&B; hip-hop
- Length: 3:21
- Label: JYP; Republic
- Composers: Earattack; Boy Matthews; Cleo Tighe; Lee Woo-hyun
- Lyricists: Matthews; Tighe; Megan Pete

Twice singles chronology
"Dive" (2024)	"Strategy" (2024)	"Takedown" (2025)

Twice English singles chronology
"I Got You" (2024)	"Strategy" (2024)	"Takedown" (2025)

Megan Thee Stallion singles chronology
"Bigger in Texas" (2024)	"Strategy" (2024)	"Whenever" (2025)

Music video
- "Strategy" on YouTube

"Strategy" is a song recorded by South Korean girl group Twice featuring American rapper-songwriter Megan Thee Stallion. It was released as the lead single of Twice's fourteenth extended play, Strategy, on December 6, 2024. It was written by Boy Matthews, Cleo Tighe and Megan Thee Stallion (credited as Megan Pete), and composed by Earattack, Matthews, Tighe and Lee Woo-hyun.

A solo version of "Strategy" was also included on Strategy, and an EP of remixes titled Strategy 2.0 was released on December 18, 2024. The solo version was later included on the soundtrack to the film KPop Demon Hunters, released on June 20, 2025. The song peaked at number 48 on the Billboard Global 200 and number 112 on South Korea's Circle Digital Chart. It also entered charts in Australia, Canada, Hong Kong, Japan, Malaysia, the Philippines, Singapore, and the United Kingdom, and the top ten in Taiwan. In the United States, the song peaked at number 51 on the Billboard Hot 100 and was certified platinum by the Recording Industry Association of America.

== Critical reception ==
Professional ratings
Review scores
Source	Rating
IZM	3/5 stars

"Strategy" was listed as one of the best global collaborations in 2024 by Rolling Stone Korea, having been praised as "a song full of girl crush charm". Lim Dong-yeop of IZM scored the song three out of five stars, highlighting its utilization of retro sounds and sensual beats.

=== Listicles ===
Name of critic or publication, name of listicle and rank
Critic/Publication	List	Rank	Ref.
Complex	The 15 Best K-Pop and Rap Collaborations of All Time	15th	

== Commercial performance ==
In the United States, "Strategy" debuted at number three on the Bubbling Under Hot 100 chart in December 2024. The song had a resurgence in popularity due to its inclusion on the soundtrack to the film KPop Demon Hunters, released on June 20, 2025. On July 29, "Strategy" debuted on the Billboard Hot 100 at number 92, marking Twice's fourth entry on the chart. It rose to number 74 the following week, charting higher than Twice's previous singles "The Feels" and "Moonlight Sunrise". On September 2, "Strategy" peaked at number 51, a personal best for the group. It is also Twice's longest-charting song on the Hot 100. In the United Kingdom, "Strategy" peaked at number 32 on the Official Singles Chart.

== Accolades ==
Music program awards
Program	Date	Ref.
Music Bank	December 13, 2024	

== Track listing ==
- Digital download and streaming – Strategy 2.0
1. "Strategy" (version 1.0) – 3:05
2. "Strategy" (Slom remix) – 2:42
3. "Strategy" (house) – 3:00
4. "Strategy" (moombahton) – 2:55
5. "Strategy" (instrumental) – 2:46

== Charts ==
=== Weekly charts ===
Weekly chart performance
Chart (2024–2025)	Peak position
Australia (ARIA)	45
Canada Hot 100 (Billboard)	48
Global 200 (Billboard)	39
Hong Kong (Billboard)	14
Ireland (IRMA)	54
Japan Hot 100 (Billboard)	43
Japan Hot 100 (Billboard) Megan Thee Stallion version	57
Japan Combined Singles (Oricon)	29
Lithuania Airplay (TopHit)	92
Malaysia (Billboard)	19
Malaysia International (RIM)	14
New Zealand (Recorded Music NZ)	34
Philippines Hot 100 (Billboard)	25
Singapore (RIAS)	15
South Korea (Circle)	112
Taiwan (Billboard)	6
UK Singles (Official Charts)	32
US Billboard Hot 100	51
US Pop Airplay (Billboard)	37

=== Monthly charts ===
Monthly chart performance
Chart (2024)	Position
South Korea (Circle)	135

=== Year-end charts ===
Year-end chart performance
Chart (2025)	Position
Global 200 (Billboard)	179

== Certifications ==
Certifications
Region	Certification	Certified units/sales
Brazil (Pro-Música Brasil)	Gold	20,000^{‡}
New Zealand (RMNZ)	Platinum	30,000^{‡}
United Kingdom (BPI)	Silver	200,000^{‡}
United States (RIAA)	Platinum	1,000,000^{‡}
^{‡} Sales+streaming figures based on certification alone.

== Release history ==
Release dates and formats
Region	Date	Format(s)	Version	Label	Ref.
Various	December 6, 2024	Digital download; streaming	Solo; Megan Thee Stallion version	JYP; Republic	
United States	December 10, 2024	Contemporary hit radio	Megan Thee Stallion version	JYP; Republic	
United States	December 11, 2024	Digital download	Strategy 2.0 EP	JYP; Republic	
Various	December 18, 2024	Digital download; streaming	Strategy 2.0 EP	JYP; Republic	

== See also ==
- List of Music Bank Chart winners (2024)
