= Chaeyoung =

South Korean singer (born 1999)

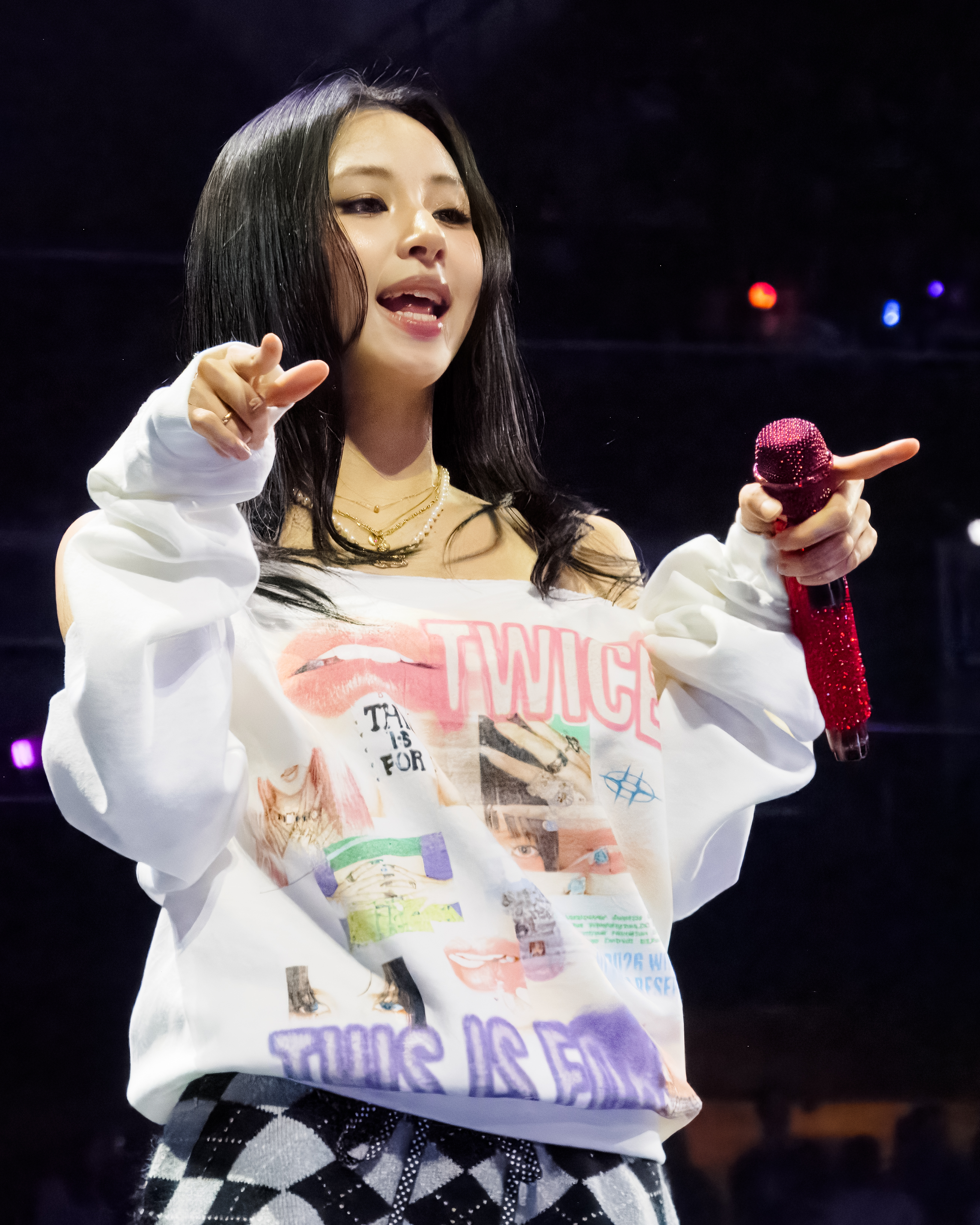
- Chaeyoung in 2026
- Born: Son Chae-young; April 23, 1999 (age 27); Seoul, South Korea
- Education: Hanlim Multi Art School
- Occupations: Singer; rapper
- Musical career
- Genres: K-pop; J-pop
- Instrument: Vocals
- Years active: 2015–present
- Labels: JYP; Warner Japan; Republic; Lil Fantasy
- Member of: Twice

Korean name
- Hangul: 손채영
- RR: Son Chaeyeong
- MR: Son Ch'aeyŏng

Son Chae-young (Korean: 손채영; born April 23, 1999), known mononymously as Chaeyoung, is a South Korean singer and rapper. She is a member of the girl group Twice, formed by JYP Entertainment in 2015.

Chaeyoung released her debut studio album Lil Fantasy Vol. 1 and its lead single "Shoot (Firecracker)" in September 2025.

== Life and career ==
=== Early life and pre-debut activities ===
Chaeyoung was born in Seoul, South Korea on April 23, 1999. She took interest in the performing arts from a young age and used to model for a children's magazine. Chaeyoung decided she wanted to become a singer before joining JYP Entertainment and took dance lessons for over one year. At age 13, she passed the auditions and ended up joining the company. As a trainee, she appeared in the music videos for Got7's "Stop Stop It" (2014) and Miss A's "Only You" (2015).

=== 2015–present: Sixteen, Twice and solo activities ===
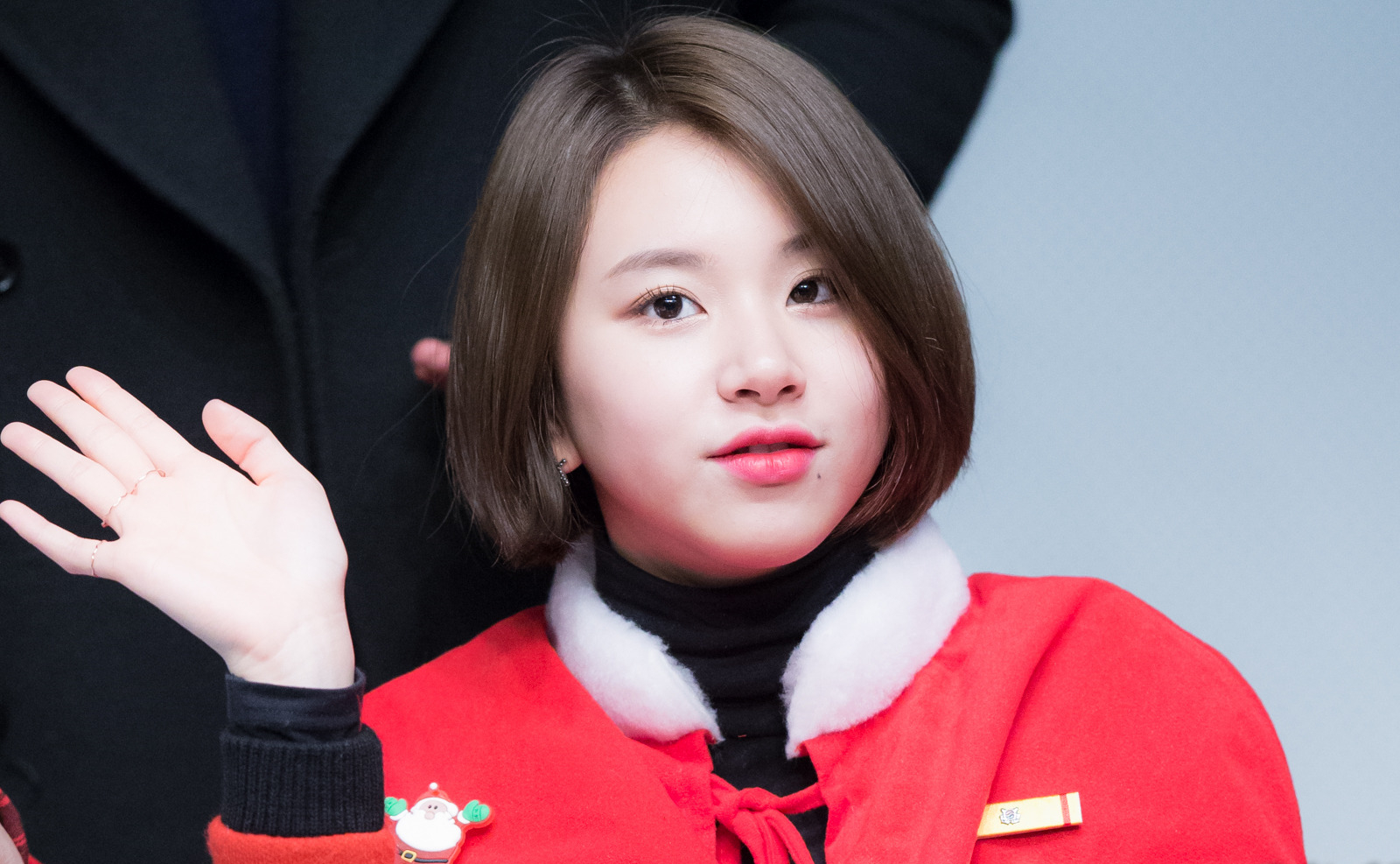
Chaeyoung during a fansigning in 2015

Chaeyoung participated in the reality television competition Sixteen in 2015. Ranking sixth place out of the nine debut spots, she went on to join the newly formed girl group Twice as one of its rappers and singers. On October 20, 2015, Twice officially debuted with the release of their first extended play (EP) The Story Begins.

Chaeyoung became the first member of the group to receive writing credits when she wrote a rap verse for Twice's version of J. Y. Park's "Precious Love" as part of their 2016 EP Page Two. Since then, Chaeyoung has participated in writing lyrics for multiple songs by Twice. For the group's second Japanese studio album &Twice, on the track "How U Doin'", Chaeyoung took part in composing for the first time, making her the first member to do so. She also designed the limited edition cover of Page Two and three different pairs of Spris shoes.

As a soloist, Chaeyoung released covers of "Alone" by Cheeze, "Off My Face" by Justin Bieber, and "Weatherman" by Eddie Benjamin as part of the Melody Project series. In 2022, she began learning to play the guitar in anticipation of a potential solo debut. She then performed an unreleased solo track titled "My Guitar" on Twice's Ready to Be World Tour. In October 2023, Chaeyoung collaborated with pop duo Coco & Clair Clair on a remix of their song "Pop Star".

On June 10, 2025, JYP Entertainment announced that Chaeyoung was preparing for her solo debut. Her debut studio album, Lil Fantasy Vol. 1, was released on September 12, with "Shoot (Firecracker)" serving as the lead single. The album was a critical and commercial success for Chaeyoung, debuting at number 3 on South Korea's Circle Album Chart, and being named as one of the best K-pop albums of 2025 by Idology, Rolling Stone, and Billboard. She also featured on rapper Sokodomo's single "Wake Up", released on November 20. On November 21, JYP Entertainment announced that Chaeyoung had been diagnosed with vasovagal syncope and due to health concerns would be taking a hiatus until the end of the year.

In August 2026, Chaeyoung announced that she had left JYP Entertainment and had established her independent label, Lil Fantasy, for her solo activities. She stated she would remain active as a member of Twice.

== Endorsements ==
In September 2023, Chaeyoung was selected as a brand ambassador for Italian fashion house Etro in Japan. In November, she was chosen as the brand muse for Japanese cosmetics brand CipiCipi.

== Personal life ==
Chaeyoung attended Hanlim Multi Art School with bandmate Tzuyu, graduating in 2019. In 2020, Chaeyoung's personal phone number was leaked on social media; JYP Entertainment released a statement about the incident, and she responded directly on Twice's Instagram page.

On April 5, 2024, JYP Entertainment confirmed that Chaeyoung is in a relationship with singer-songwriter Zion.T.

She is Catholic and her baptismal name is Katarina.

=== T-shirt controversies ===
On March 18, 2023, Chaeyoung appeared wearing a shirt with imagery of QAnon, an American far-right conspiracy theory movement, during a promotion of "Set Me Free" on MBC's Show! Music Core. The crop top showed a large Q in American-flag print with the words "We Go All" below it, a prominent slogan of the conspiracy theory group. Three days later, on March 21, the singer posted a picture on Instagram in which she was wearing a T-shirt with Nazi imagery. The T-shirt specifically featured an image of Sid Vicious, bassist of the Sex Pistols, wearing a tilted right-facing swastika identical to the one used by Nazi Germany. Chaeyoung subsequently removed the Instagram post and issued an apology. In the apology, she wrote, "I didn't correctly recognise the meaning of the tilted swastika in the t-shirt I wore". Chaeyoung's label, JYP Entertainment, also issued an apology with regard to her Instagram post taking responsibility "for not thoroughly reviewing it from the label side". The apologies by Chaeyoung and her label did not address the QAnon shirt.

== Discography ==
=== Studio albums ===
List of studio albums, showing selected details, chart positions and sales
Title	Details	Peak chart positions					Sales
Title	Details	KOR	JPN	JPN Hot	US	US World	Sales
Lil Fantasy Vol. 1	Released: September 12, 2025; Label: JYP, Republic; Formats: CD, LP, digital download, streaming	3	12	74	38	3	KOR: 186,589; JPN: 9,752

=== Singles ===
List of singles, showing year released, selected chart positions and album name
Title	Year	Peak chart positions										Certifications	Album
Title	Year	KOR	AUS	CAN	MLY	NZ	SGP	TWN	UK	US	WW	Certifications	Album
"Pop Star" (Chaeyoung remix) (with Coco & Clair Clair)	2023	—	—	—	—	—	—	—	—	—	—		Sexy (deluxe edition)
"Takedown" (with Jeongyeon and Jihyo of Twice)	2025	38	28	45	23	29	22	15	24	50	30	BPI: Silver; RMNZ: Gold	KPop Demon Hunters
"Shoot (Firecracker)"	2025	— (Note: "Shoot (Firecracker)" did not enter the Circle Digital Chart, but debuted and peaked at number 25 on the Download Chart.)	—	—	—	—	—	—	—	—	—		Lil Fantasy Vol. 1
"Wake Up" (Sokodomo featuring Chaeyoung)	2025	—	—	—	—	—	—	—	—	—	—		Scorpio000-^
"—" denotes a recording that did not chart or was not released in that territory.

=== Other charted songs ===
List of other charted songs, showing year released, selected chart positions and name of the album
Title	Year	Peak chart positions			Album
Title	Year	KOR Down	NZ Hot	US World	Album
"I'll Show You" (with Jihyo, Nayeon, Sana, Bekuh Boom and Annika Wells as K/DA)	2020	—	38	10	All Out
"Avocado" (feat Gliiico)	2025	115	—	—	Lil Fantasy Vol.1
"Band-Aid"	2025	120	—	—	Lil Fantasy Vol.1
"Girl"	2025	122	—	—	Lil Fantasy Vol.1
"Ribbons" (feat Sumin & Jibin)	2025	121	—	—	Lil Fantasy Vol.1
"Downpour" (feat Gliiico)	2025	126	—	—	Lil Fantasy Vol.1
"BF"	2025	125	—	—	Lil Fantasy Vol.1
"Shadow Puppet"	2025	119	—	—	Lil Fantasy Vol.1
"My Guitar"	2025	124	—	—	Lil Fantasy Vol.1
"In My Room" (Note: credited to Twice, but the track is a solo by Chaeyoung)	2025	194	—	—	Ten: The Story Goes On

=== Guest appearances ===
List of non-single guest appearances, showing year released and name of the album
Title	Year	Album
"Daring Woman" (당돌한 여자) (with Jihyo, Nayeon and Tzuyu)	2015	Two Yoo Project – Sugar Man Pt. 11

=== Songwriting credits ===
All song credits are adapted from the Korea Music Copyright Association's database unless stated otherwise.

List of songs, showing year released, artist name, and name of the album
Title	Year	Artist	Album	Lyricist	Composer	Arranger	Ref.
"Precious Love" (소중한 사랑)	2016	Twice	Page Two	Yes	No	No	
"Eye, Eye, Eyes"	2017	Twice	Signal	Yes	No	No	—N/a
"Missing U"	2017	Twice	Twicetagram	Yes	No	No	—N/a
"Don't Give Up" (힘내!)	2017	Twice	Twicetagram	Yes	No	No	—N/a
"Sweet Talker"	2018	Twice	What Is Love?	Yes	No	No	—N/a
"Young & Wild"	2018	Twice	Yes or Yes	Yes	No	No	—N/a
"Strawberry"	2019	Twice	Fancy You	Yes	No	No	—N/a
"21:29"	2019	Twice	Feel Special	Yes	No	No	—N/a
"How U Doin'"	2019	Twice	&Twice	Yes	Yes	No	—N/a
"Sweet Summer Day"	2020	Twice	More & More	Yes	No	No	—N/a
"Handle It"	2020	Twice	Eyes Wide Open	Yes	No	No	—N/a
"The Feels" (Korean ver.)	2021	Twice	Formula of Love: O+T=<3	Yes	No	No	—N/a
"Celebrate"	2022	Twice	Celebrate	Yes	No	No	—N/a
"Basics"	2022	Twice	Between 1&2	Yes	No	No	—N/a
"Pop Star" (Chaeyoung remix)	2023	Coco & Clair Clair and Chaeyoung	Sexy (Deluxe Edition)	Yes	Yes	No	—N/a
"Rush"	2024	Twice	With You-th	Yes	No	No	—N/a
"Avocado"	2025	Chaeyoung featuring Gliiico	Lil Fantasy Vol. 1	Yes	Yes	Yes	—N/a
"Band-Aid"	2025	Chaeyoung	Lil Fantasy Vol. 1	Yes	Yes	Yes	—N/a
"Shoot (Firecracker)"	2025	Chaeyoung	Lil Fantasy Vol. 1	Yes	Yes	Yes	—N/a
"Girl"	2025	Chaeyoung	Lil Fantasy Vol. 1	Yes	Yes	Yes	—N/a
"Ribbons"	2025	Chaeyoung featuring Sumin, Jibin of Y2K92	Lil Fantasy Vol. 1	Yes	Yes	No	—N/a
"Downpour"	2025	Chaeyoung and Kai	Lil Fantasy Vol. 1	Yes	Yes	Yes	—N/a
"BF"	2025	Chaeyoung	Lil Fantasy Vol. 1	Yes	No	No	—N/a
"Shadow Puppet" (그림자놀이)	2025	Chaeyoung	Lil Fantasy Vol. 1	Yes	Yes	No	—N/a
"My Guitar" (내 기타)	2025	Chaeyoung	Lil Fantasy Vol. 1	Yes	Yes	No	—N/a
"Lonely Doll Waltz"	2025	Chaeyoung	Lil Fantasy Vol. 1	—N/a	Yes	Yes	—N/a
"Me+You"	2025	Twice	Ten: The Story Goes On	Yes	No	No	—N/a
"Wake Up"	2025	Sokodomo featuring Chaeyoung	Scorpio000-^	Yes	Yes	No	—N/a

== Videography ==
=== Music videos ===
List of music videos, showing year released, and name of the director(s)
Title	Year	Director	Ref.
"Avocado" (featuring Gliiico)	2025	Luke Casey	
"Shoot (Firecracker)"	2025	Minjae Kim (Sigakryu)	

== Filmography ==
=== Television shows ===
Year	Title	Role	Notes	Ref.
2015	Sixteen	Contestant	Finished 6th place	

=== Hosting ===
Year	Title	Notes	Ref.
2016	Suwon K-pop Super Concert	with Kim Hee-chul, Zhou Mi and Momo	

== Bibliography ==
=== Photobooks ===
Title	Release date	Publisher	Ref.
Yes, I am Chaeyoung.	February 20, 2023	JYP Entertainment	
Once More	July 18, 2024	Hearst	

== Awards and nominations ==
Name of the award ceremony, year presented, award category, nominee of the award, and the result of the nomination
Award ceremony	Year	Category	Nominee / Work	Result	Ref.
Korean Music Awards	2026	Best K-Pop Album	Lil Fantasy Vol. 1	Nominated	
