= List of Circle Album Chart number ones of 2023 =

The Circle Album Chart is a South Korean record chart that ranks the best-selling albums and EPs in South Korea. It is part of the Circle Chart, which launched in February 2010 as the Gaon Chart. The data is compiled by the Ministry of Culture, Sports and Tourism and the Korea Music Content Industry Association based upon weekly/monthly physical album sales by major South Korean distributors such as Kakao Entertainment, YG Plus, Sony Music Korea, Warner Music Korea, Universal Music and Dreamus.

== Weekly charts ==
List of number-one albums on the weekly Circle Album Chart in 2023
Week ending date	Album	Artist	Weekly sales	Ref.
January 7	OMG	NewJeans	596,650	
January 14	Reason	Monsta X	370,000	
January 21	OMG	NewJeans	121,342	
January 28	The Name Chapter: Temptation	Tomorrow X Together	1,729,589	
February 4	Ay-Yo	NCT 127	965,126	
February 11	Second Wind	BSS	418,750	
February 18	Teddy Bear	STAYC	269,367	
February 25	One	Lee Chan-won	561,854	
March 4	Teddy Bear	STAYC	69,535	
March 11	Ready to Be	Twice	1,427,039	
March 18	Rover	Kai	196,022	
March 25	Face	Jimin	1,099,988	
April 1	Me	Jisoo	875,922	
April 8	Me	Jisoo	89,970	
April 15	I've Ive	Ive	1,385,998	
April 22	D-Day	Agust D	957,568	
April 29	FML	Seventeen	3,360,524	
May 6	Unforgiven	Le Sserafim	1,113,581	
May 13	My World	Aespa	1,420,178	
May 20	I Feel	(G)I-dle	767,954	
May 27	Dark Blood	Enhypen	1,356,682	
June 3	5-Star	Stray Kids	4,330,039	
June 10	5-Star	Stray Kids	509,185	
June 17	The World EP.2: Outlaw	Ateez	967,822	
June 24	The World EP.2: Outlaw	Ateez	225,142	
July 1	FML	Seventeen	392,998	
July 8	I Feel	(G)I-dle	56,000	
July 15	Exist	Exo	1,177,589	
July 22	ISTJ	NCT Dream	2,755,587	
July 29	Reboot	Treasure	1,533,616	
August 5	Kill My Doubt	Itzy	1,243,665	
August 12	Youth in the Shade	Zerobaseone	337,691	
August 19	Zone	Jihyo	584,225	
August 26	The Girls	Blackpink	160,460	
September 2	Golden Age	NCT	961,463	
September 9	Layover	V	1,451,622	
September 16	Sun Seeker	Cravity	292,803	
September 23	Target: Me	Evnne	209,701	
September 30	Get a Guitar	Riize	350,000	
October 7	Fact Check	NCT 127	1,040,091	
October 14	The Name Chapter: Freefall	Tomorrow X Together	2,457,606	
October 21	I've Mine	Ive	141,424	
October 28	Seventeenth Heaven	Seventeen	4,689,565	
November 4	Golden	Jungkook	1,724,933	
November 11	Rock-Star	Stray Kids	3,650,904	
November 18	Orange Blood	Enhypen	1,625,160	
November 25	Phantasy Pt. 2: Sixth Sense	The Boyz	299,055	
December 2	The World EP.Fin: Will	Ateez	1,370,690	
December 9	Face	Jimin	56,217	
December 16	The World EP.Fin: Will	Ateez	35,579	
December 23	Chill Kill	Red Velvet	60,482	
December 30	Be There for Me	NCT 127	546,364	

== Monthly charts ==
List of number-one albums on the monthly Circle Album Chart in 2023
Month	Album	Artist	Sales	Ref.
January	The Name Chapter: Temptation	Tomorrow X Together	1,899,464	
February	One	Lee Chan-won	562,259	
March	Ready to Be	Twice	1,531,148	
April	FML	Seventeen	3,360,524	
May	My World	Aespa	1,949,219	
June	5-Star	Stray Kids	5,242,486	
July	ISTJ	NCT Dream	3,076,036	
August	Golden Age	NCT	955,109	
September	Layover	V	1,622,902	
October	Seventeenth Heaven	Seventeen	4,716,230	
November	Rock-Star	Stray Kids	3,933,334	
December	The World EP.Fin: Will	Ateez	1,444,021	
