= 2023 MAMA Awards =

25th edition of the MAMA Awards held in 2023

- Date: November 28–29, 2023
- Venue: Tokyo Dome
- Country: Japan
- Presented by: Samsung Galaxy
- Hosted by: Jeon Somi (Nov 28); Park Bo-gum (Nov 29)

Highlights
- Most wins: Seventeen (5)
- Website: 2023 MAMA Awards

Television/radio coverage
- Network: Mnet

The 2023 MAMA Awards took place on November 28 and 29, 2023 at the Tokyo Dome in Japan. Presented by Samsung Galaxy, it was hosted by singer Jeon Somi and actor and singer Park Bo-gum.

== Background ==
The event was organized by CJ ENM, and broadcast through its music channel Mnet. On September 21, 2023, CJ ENM announced that the event would be held in Japan at the Tokyo Dome. It was also announced that the theme for this edition would be titled "One I Born" carrying the meaning of "I" and "MAMA", the only beings in the world with infinite possibilities, meeting and becoming a perfect "One" "through positive energy". On November 2, Mnet announced that singer Jeon So-mi and actor and singer Park Bo-gum will be returning to host on Day 1 and Day 2, respectively, similar with last year's event.

=== Selection process ===
All songs and albums that are eligible to be nominated must be released from October 22, 2022, to September 30, 2023. Nominees would be evaluated based on data provided by Circle Chart, Spotify, and YouTube with verification performed by PwC.

Criteria for 2023 MAMA Awards nominations
| Category | Digital sales (Download + Streaming) | Record sales | Music video view counts | Online voting | Judges panel evaluations |
|---|---|---|---|---|---|
| Artist of the Year | 40% (25% Korea + 15% Global) | 40% | N/A | | 20% |
| Categories by Artist (Note: Consists of Best New Male, Best New Female Artist, Best Male Artist, Best Female Artist, Best Male Group, and Best Female Group) | 40% (25% Korea + 15% Global) | 40% | N/A | | 20% |
| Song of the Year | 80% (50% Korea + 30% Global) | N/A | | | 20% |
| Categories by Genre (Note: Consists of Best Dance Performance – Solo, Best Dance Performance – Male Group, Best Dance Performance – Female Group, Best Vocal Performance – Solo, Best Dance Performance – Group, Best Rap & Hip Hop Music, Best Collaboration, and Best OST) | 80% (50% Korea + 30% Global) | N/A | | | 20% |
| Album of the Year | N/A | 80% | N/A | | 20% |
| Best Music Video | N/A | | 80% | N/A | 20% |
| Worldwide Icon of the Year | N/A | | | 100% (70% Mnet Plus + 30% Spotify) | N/A |
| Worldwide Fans' Choice Top 10 | N/A | | | 100% (70% Mnet Plus + 30% Spotify) | N/A |

== Performers ==
The list of performers were announced on October 24, October 31, and November 8.

=== Day 1 ===
Performances for Day 1
| Artist(s) | Song(s) | Theme |
|---|---|---|
| Lee Young-ji, Hong Eun-chae (Le Sserafim), Zhang Hao (Zerobaseone), Choi Hyun-suk (Treasure), Haruto (Treasure), and Yoshi (Treasure) | Speech and Rap (Note: Performed by Lee Young-ji.) + Dance performance (Note: Performed by Lee Young-ji and Hong Eun-chae.) + "Here I Am" (String version) (Note: Performed by Zhang Hao.) + "G.O.A.T." (MAMA version) (Note: Performed by Choi Hyun-suk, Haruto and Yoshi.) | "I Am Special" (Theme Stage) (Note: Described as a "collaboration stage with various artists incorporating the theme of previous MAMA editions".) |
| Just B | "Medusa" (MAMA version) | "Future In Our Hands" |
| &Team | "War Cry" | "Boys, Become Wolf" |
| Kep1er | "Grand Prix" (MAMA version) | "Kep Up The Speed" |
| Yoshiki, Huening Kai (Tomorrow X Together), Taehyun (Tomorrow X Together), Jaehyun (BoyNextDoor), Anton (Riize), Han Yu-jin (Zerobaseone) | "Endless Rain" | "Music Goes Infinity And Beyond" (Wonder Stage) (Note: Described as a "collaboration stage carriny the message of Music Makes One".) |
| Xikers | "It's the Land" + "Xikey" + "In the Den" + "Do or Die" | "Welcome To Xikey-Land" |
| JO1 and INI | "Intro" + "Venus" + "Hana" + "Outro" | "Coexist (共存)" |
| Jeon Somi | "The Way" + "Fast Forward" | "It's MI" (Mega Stage) (Note: Described as a "stage with overwhelming scale".) |
| Dynamic Duo, cast of Street Woman Fighter 2 | "AEAO" + "Diamonds" (Note: Performed by Kirsten.) (Orig. Rihanna) + "Attitude" (Note: Performed by Bada & Funky-Y.) (Orig. Hyuna) + "Whoopty" (Note: Performed by Akanen, Halo & Nob.) (Orig. CJ) + "Mi Gente" (Note: Performed by Lia Kim & Mina Myoung.) (Orig. J Balvin & Willy William (feat. Beyoncé)) + "Smoke" | "Dream To Dream" (Exclusive Stage) |
| Enhypen | "Bite Me" + "Sweet Venom" | "From Eternity Into Mortality" |
| Tomorrow X Together | "Sugar Rush Ride" + "Chasing That Feeling" | "Where's Happy Ending?" |
| TVXQ, Riize | "Down" + "Rising Sun" | "Eternal Glory Moment" |

=== Day 2 ===
Performances for Day 2
| Artist(s) | Song(s) | Theme |
|---|---|---|
| Ateez and Ryu Seung-ryong | "Ready or Not" + "Bouncy (K-Hot Chilli Peppers)" + "Weeoo" + "Crazy Form" | "Spiceez On The Move" (Cinematic Stage) (Note: Described as a "collaboration stage that shows a different combination of K-pop and content elements in global scene".) |
| El7z Up | "Cheeky" (Intro) + "Snap" (MAMA version) | "Master <Piece>" |
| BoyNextDoor | "One and Only" + "But Sometimes" (MAMA version) | "Knock On Your Heart" |
| Huh Yunjin (Le Sserafim), Xiaoting (Kep1er), Bada Lee (Street Woman Fighter 2), Monika (Street Woman Fighter), Minnie ((G)I-dle) | "The Great Mermaid" (MAMA version) (Note: Performed by Huh Yunjin.) + "Snake" (MAMA version) (Note: Performed by Xiaoting.) + "Chimera" (Note: Performed by Monika and Bada.) + "Lion" (MAMA version) (Note: Performed by Minnie.) + "Mago" (Note: Sung by Lim Kim.) | "Goddess Awakened" (Super Stage) (Note: Described as a "dream stage for K-pop artists".) |
| Riize | "Talk Saxy" + "Siren" | "We All Rise" |
| NiziU | "Heartris" | "Start To Love" |
| Zerobaseone | "In Bloom" (Intro) + "Take My Hand" + "Crush" | "Because You Saved Me" |
| Le Sserafim | "Eve, Psyche & the Bluebeard's Wife" (MAMA version) | "Revolution On The Street" |
| Treasure | "Move" (Note: Performed and sung by T5.) + "Bona Bona" | "I Need Your Love" |
| (G)I-dle | "Queencard" (MAMA version) | "This Is I-dle" (Mega Stage) |
| Seventeen | "God of Music" + "Super" | "The Feast In Seventeenth Heaven" (Special Stage) |

== Presenters ==
2023 MAMA Awards hosts

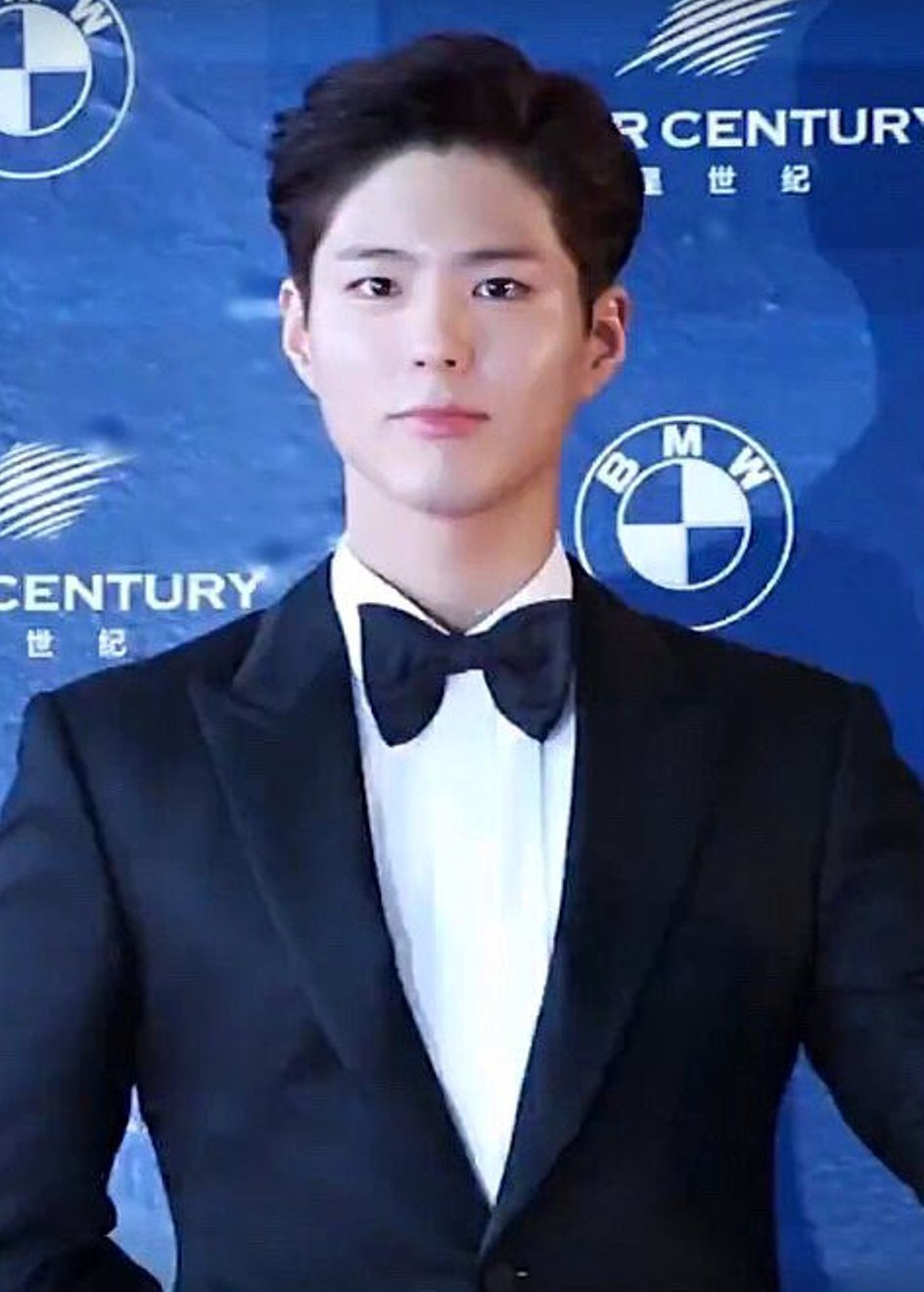
Park Bo-gum

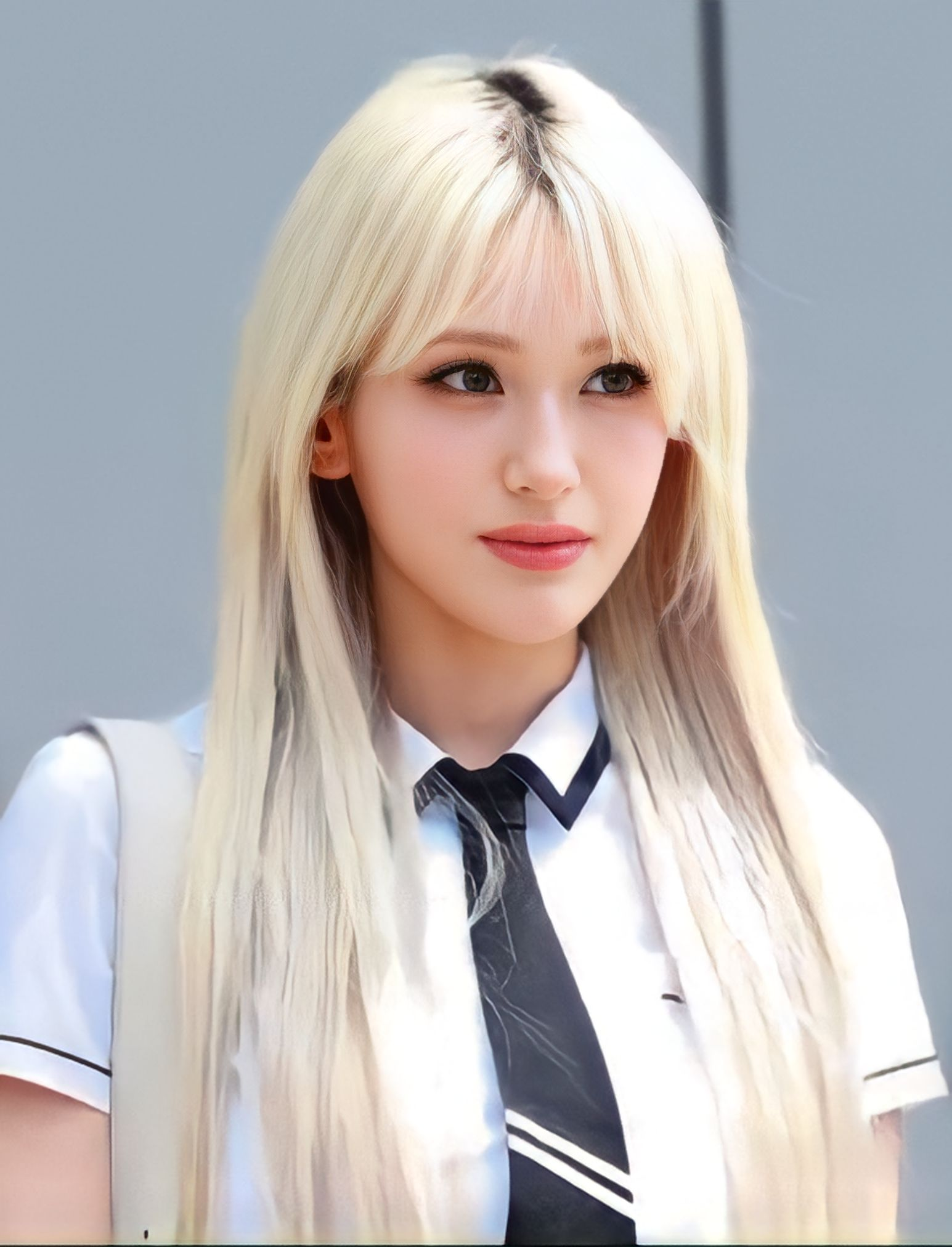
Jeon Somi

The list of presenters were announced on November 15, 2023.

=== Day 1 ===
Presenters for Day 1
| Artist(s) | Award(s) presented |
|---|---|
| Jung Chan Sung and Yun Sung-bin | Worldwide Fans' Choice Top 10 |
| Dynamic Duo and Uhm Jung-hwa | Worldwide Fans' Choice Top 10 |
| Lee Joon-hyuk and Munetaka Aoki | Worldwide Fans' Choice Top 10 |
| Kim So-hyun and Hwang Min-hyun | Favorite New Artist |
| Kim So-hyun and Hwang Min-hyun | Worldwide Fans' Choice Top 10 |
| Ahn Jae-hong | Favorite Asian Female Group |
| Ahn Jae-hong | Worldwide Fans' Choice Top 10 |
| Go Min-si and RalRal | Worldwide Fans' Choice Top 10 |
| Cha Seung-won | Favorite International Artist |
| Dynamic Duo and Lee Young-ji | Worldwide Fans' Choice Top 10 |
| Lee Jun-ho | Favorite Asian Male Group |
| Lee Jun-ho | Worldwide Icon of the Year |

=== Day 2 ===
Presenters for Day 2
| Artist(s) | Award(s) presented |
|---|---|
| Byeon Woo-seok and Roh Yoon-seo | Best New Male Artist |
| Byeon Woo-seok and Roh Yoon-seo | Best New Female Artist |
| Park Gyu-young | Best Dance Performance – Male Group |
| Park Gyu-young | Best Dance Performance – Female Solo |
| Jung Kyung-ho | Favorite Dance Performance – Male Group |
| Yoo Yeon-seok | Favorite Global Performance – Female Group |
| Yoo Yeon-seok | Best Vocal Performance – Group |
| Lee Je-hoon | Best Male Group |
| Lee Je-hoon | Best Vocal Performance – Solo |
| Choi Soo-young | Favorite Global Performer – Male Group |
| Choi Soo-young | Best Female Artist |
| Park Eun-bin | Song of the Year |
| Jung Kyung-ho and Yoo Yeon-seok | Favorite Dance Performance – Female Group |
| Jung Kyung-ho and Yoo Yeon-seok | Best Male Artist |
| Ryu Seung-ryong | Artist of the Year |
| Uhm Jung-hwa | Album of the Year |

== Winners and nominees ==
The listing for nominees were announced on October 19, 2023, through the Mnet Plus mobile application, with voting for Worldwide Icon of the Year and Worldwide Fans' Choice Top 10 happening from October 19 to November 20. Winners and nominees are listed in alphanumerical order. Winners are listed first and highlighted in bold.

=== Main awards ===
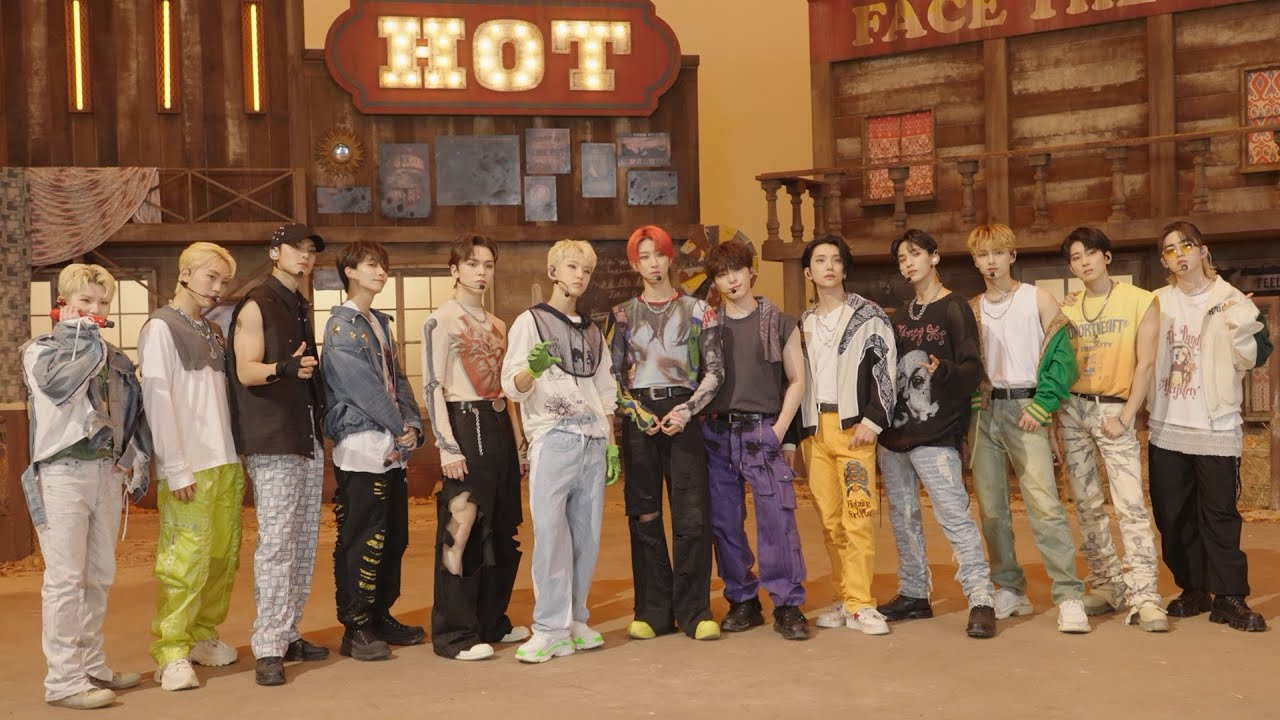
Seventeen won five awards, including the Album of the Year (Daesang), Best Male Group, Best Dance Performance – Male Group, Worldwide Fans' Choice Top 10, and Culture and Style

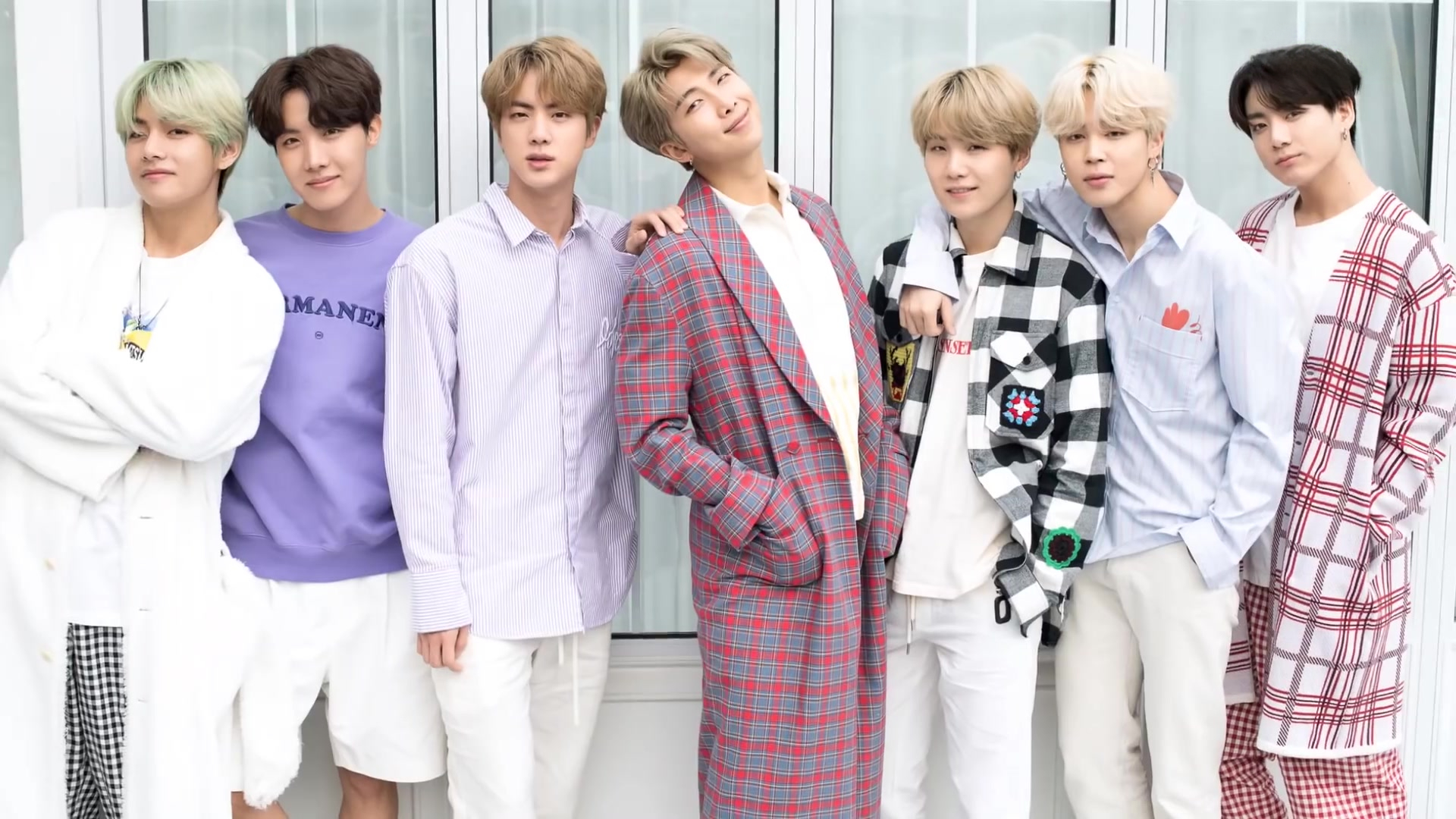
BTS won three awards, including the Worldwide Icon of the Year (Daesang), Best OST, and Worldwide Fans' Choice Top 10

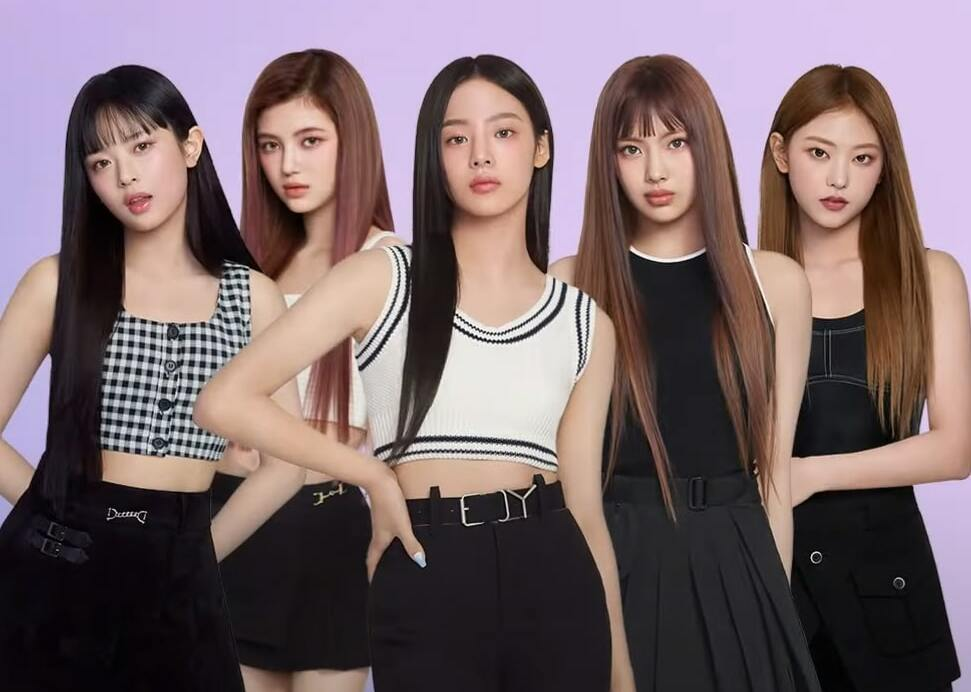
NewJeans won four awards, including the Artist of the Year (Daesang), Song of the Year (Daesang), Best Female Group, and Best Dance Performance – Female Group

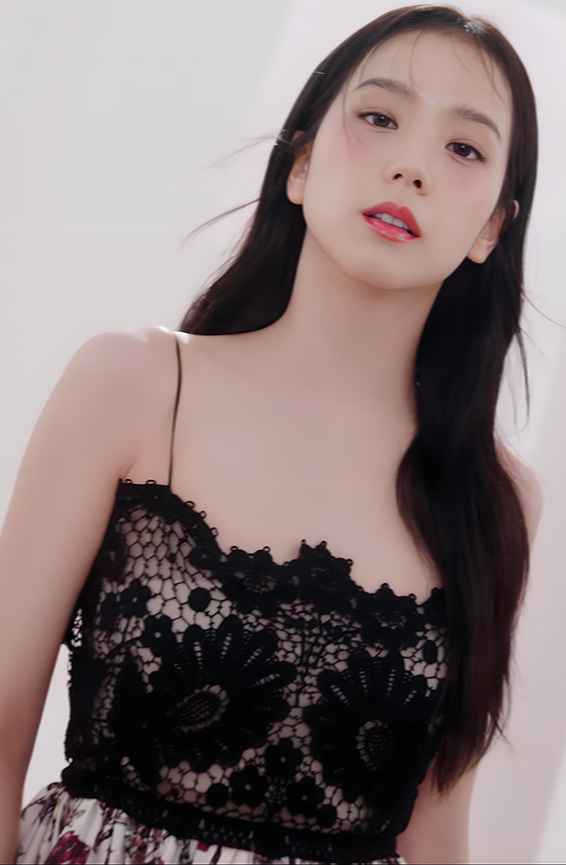
Jisoo won three awards, including the Best Female Artist, Best Dance Performance – Female Solo, and Best Music Video.

| Samsung Galaxy Artist of the Year (Daesang) | Samsung Galaxy Song of the Year (Daesang) |
|---|---|
| **NewJeans**; Ive; NCT Dream; Seventeen; Stray Kids; List of longlisted nominees: (G)I-dle; Adya; Aespa; BoyNextDoor; Choi Ye-na; El7z Up; Evnne; Exo; Hwasa; Jeon Somi; Jihyo; Jimin; Jisoo; Jungkook; Kiss Of Life; Le Sserafim; Lee Chae-yeon; Lim Young-woong; LimeLight; Parc Jae-jung; Riize; Taeyang; Tomorrow X Together; Treasure; TripleS; Twice; V; Xikers; Zerobaseone | **NewJeans – "Ditto"**; (G)I-dle – "Queencard"; Ive – "I Am"; Jisoo – "Flower"; Jungkook – "Seven" (feat. Latto); List of longlisted nominees: Aespa – "Spicy"; Agust D – "People Pt. 2" (feat. IU); AKMU – "Love Lee"; Anne-Marie, Minnie – "Expectations"; Ash Island – "Goodbye" (feat. Paul Blanco); Big Naughty – "Hopeless Romantic" (feat. Lee Su-hyun); Big Naughty – "With Me"; BSS – "Fighting" (feat. Lee Young-ji); BtoB – "Wind and Wish"; BTS – "Take Two"; BTS – "The Planet"; Dawn – "Dear My Light"; Hwasa – "I Love My Body"; J-Hope – "On the Street" (with J. Cole); Jay Park – "Candy" (feat. Zion.T); Jeon Somi – "Fast Forward"; Jihyo – "Killin' Me Good"; Jimin – "Like Crazy"; Kai – "Rover"; Le Sserafim – "Unforgiven" (feat. Nile Rodgers); Lee Chae-yeon – "Knock"; Lee Mu-jin – "Ordinary Confession"; Lim Jae-hyun – "Heaven"; Lim Young-woong – "London Boy"; MC the Max – "Eternity"; MeloMance – "A Shining Day"; NCT 127 – "Ay-Yo"; NCT Dream – "Candy"; Parc Jae-jung – "Let's Say Goodbye"; Paul Kim – "You Remember"; Seventeen – "Super"; STAYC – "Teddy Bear"; Stray Kids – "S-Class"; Taeyang – "Vibe" (feat. Jimin); Taeyong – "Shalala"; Tomorrow X Together – "Goodbye Now"; Tomorrow X Together – "Sugar Rush Ride"; V – "Love Me Again"; Zerobaseone – "In Bloom"; Zior Park – "Christian" |
| Samsung Galaxy Album of the Year (Daesang) | Samsung Galaxy Worldwide Icon of the Year (Daesang) |
| **Seventeen – FML**; NCT Dream – ISTJ; NewJeans – Get Up; Stray Kids – 5-Star; Tomorrow X Together – The Name Chapter: Temptation; List of longlisted nominees: (G)I-dle – I Feel; Aespa – My World; Agust D – D-Day; Big Naughty – Hopeless Romantic; BtoB – Wind and Wish; El7z Up – 7+Up; Evnne – Target: Me; Exo – Exist; Ive – I've Ive; Jeon Somi – Game Plan; Jihyo – Zone; Jimin – Face; Kai – Rover; Kiss Of Life – Kiss of Life; Le Sserafim – Unforgiven; Lee Chae-yeon – Over the Moon; LimeLight – Love & Happiness; Parc Jae-jung – Alone; STAYC – Teenfresh; Taeyang – Down to Earth; Taeyong – Shalala; Treasure – Reboot; TripleS – Assemble; Twice – Ready to Be; V – Layover; Xikers – House of Tricky: How to Play; Zerobaseone – Youth in the Shade | **BTS**; Ateez; Enhypen; Lim Young-woong; NCT Dream; Seventeen; Stray Kids; Tomorrow X Together; Twice; Zerobaseone |
| Best Male Group | Best Female Group |
| **Seventeen**; Exo; NCT Dream; Stray Kids; Tomorrow X Together; Treasure | **NewJeans**; (G)I-dle; Aespa; Ive; Le Sserafim; Twice |
| Best Male Artist | Best Female Artist |
| **Jimin**; Jungkook; Lim Young-woong; Parc Jae-jung; Taeyang; V | **Jisoo**; Hwasa; Jeon Somi; Jihyo; Lee Chae-yeon; Choi Ye-na |
| Best Dance Performance – Male Group | Best Dance Performance – Female Group |
| **Seventeen – "Super"**; NCT 127 – "Ay-Yo"; NCT Dream – "Candy"; Stray Kids – "S-Class"; Tomorrow X Together – "Sugar Rush Ride"; Zerobaseone – "In Bloom" | **NewJeans – "Ditto"**; (G)I-dle – "Queencard"; Aespa – "Spicy"; Ive – "I Am"; Le Sserafim – "Unforgiven" (feat. Nile Rodgers); STAYC – "Teddy Bear" |
| Best Vocal Performance – Solo | Best Vocal Performance – Group |
| **Parc Jae-jung – "Let's Break Up"**; Dawn – "Dear My Light"; Lee Mu-jin – "Ordinary Confession"; Lim Young-woong – "London Boy"; V – "Love Me Again" | **AKMU – "Love Lee"**; BtoB – "Wind and Wish"; BTS – "Take Two"; MC the Max – "Eternity"; MeloMance – "A Shining Day" |
| Best Dance Performance – Male Solo | Best Dance Performance – Female Solo |
| **Jungkook – "Seven" (feat. Latto)**; Jimin – "Like Crazy"; Kai – "Rover"; Taeyang – "Vibe" (feat. Jimin); Taeyong – "Shalala" | **Jisoo – "Flower"**; Hwasa – "I Love My Body"; Jeon Somi – "Fast Forward"; Jihyo – "Killin' Me Good"; Lee Chae-yeon – "Knock" |
| Best New Male Artist | Best New Female Artist |
| **Zerobaseone**; BoyNextDoor; Evnne; Riize; Xikers | **TripleS**; Adya; El7z Up; Kiss of Life; LimeLight |
| Best OST | Best Rap & HipHop Performance |
| **BTS – "The Planet"**; Big Naughty – "With Me"; Lim Jae-hyun – "Heaven (2023)"; Paul Kim – "You Remember"; Tomorrow X Together – "Goodbye Now" | **Agust D – "People Pt. 2" (feat. IU)**; Ash Island – "Goodbye" (feat. Paul Blanco); J-Hope – "On the Street" (with J. Cole); Jay Park – "Candy" (feat. Zion.T); Zior Park – "Christian" |
| Best Collaboration | Best Music Video |
| **Jungkook – "Seven" (feat. Latto)**; Anne Marie and Minnie ((G)I-dle) – "Expectations"; Big Naughty – "Hopeless Romantic" (feat. Lee Su-hyun); BSS – "Fighting" (feat. Lee Young-ji); Taeyang – "Vibe" (feat. Jimin) | **Jisoo – "Flower"**; (G)I-dle – "Queencard"; Ive – "I Am"; Jungkook – "Seven" (feat. Latto); Seventeen – "Super"; Stray Kids – "S-Class" |

=== Favorite awards ===
Worldwide Fans' Choice Top 10
**Ateez**; **BTS**; **Enhypen**; **Lim Young-woong**; **NCT Dream**; **Seventeen**; **Stray Kids**; **Tomorrow X Together**; **Twice**; **Zerobaseone**; List of nominees: (G)I-dle; Aespa; AKMU; BoyNextDoor; BtoB; CIX; Cravity; Evnne; Exo; Fromis 9; H1-Key; Highlight; Itzy; Ive; Jeon Somi; Jisoo; Kep1er; Le Sserafim; Lee Chae-yeon; Lee Mu-jin; Monsta X; N.SSign; NCT 127; NewJeans; Nmixx; Oneus; P1Harmony; Parc Jae-jung; Red Velvet; Riize; Shinee; STAYC; Super Junior; Taeyang; Treasure; Xdinary Heroes; Xikers; Zior Park
| Favorite New Artist | Favorite Asian Male Group |
| **Riize**; **Zerobaseone** | **INI** |
| Favorite International Artist | Favourite Asian Female Group |
| **Yoshiki** | **Kep1er** |
| Favorite Dance Performance – Male Group | Favorite Dance Performance – Female Group |
| **Treasure** | **Le Sserafim** |
| Favorite Global Performer – Male Group | Favourite Global Performer – Female Group |
| **Ateez** | **(G)I-dle** |

=== Special awards ===
| Inspiring Achievement | Neo Flip Artist Award |
|---|---|
| **TVXQ** | **Treasure** |
Culture and Style
**Cast of Street Woman Fighter 2**; **Seventeen**

=== Multiple awards ===
The following artist(s) received three or more awards:

| Count | Artist(s) |
|---|---|
| 5 | Seventeen |
| 4 | NewJeans |
| 3 | BTS |
| 3 | Jisoo |
| 3 | Zerobaseone |

== Broadcast ==
| Region | Network | Ref. |
|---|---|---|
| Various (Note: Broadcast is available worldwide (excluding South Korea, Japan, Vietnam, Singapore, Hong Kong, Philippines, Malaysia, Taiwan, Indonesia, Myanmar, and Maldives) based on YouTube's service availability.) | YouTube (Mnet K-Pop, Mnet TV, M2, and KCON Official) | |
| South Korea | Mnet, tvN Show (awards show only), and TVING | |
| Japan | Mnet Japan, Mnet Smart+, and au Smart Pass | |
| Malaysia | tvN Asia (Note: Includes Tonton.) | |
| Singapore | tvN Asia, and meWatch | |
| Vietnam | FPT Play | |
| Hong Kong | tvN Asia | |
| Indonesia | tvN Asia | |
| Maldives | tvN Asia | |
| Myanmar | tvN Asia | |
| Philippines | tvN Asia | |
| Taiwan | tvN Asia | |
