= Jihyo =

South Korean singer (born 1997)

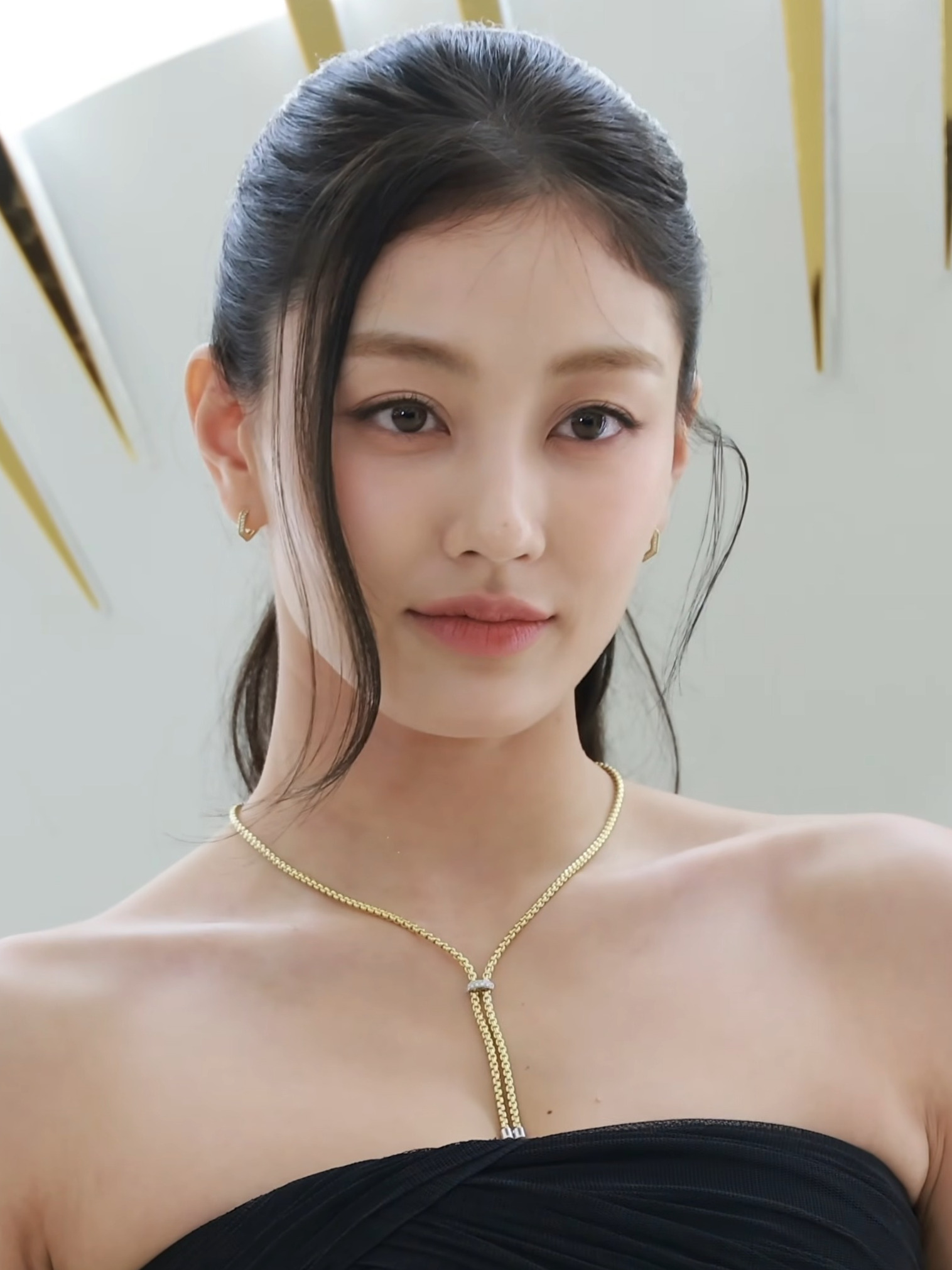
- Jihyo in 2026
- Born: Park Ji-soo; February 1, 1997 (age 29); Guri, Gyeonggi, South Korea
- Occupation: Singer
- Relatives: Lee Ha-eum (sister); Park Seo-yeon (sister)
- Musical career
- Genres: K-pop; J-pop; R&B
- Instrument: Vocals
- Years active: 2015–present
- Labels: JYP; Warner Japan; Republic; Emithaus
- Member of: Twice; JYP Nation

Korean name
- Hangul: 박지효
- RR: Bak Jihyo
- MR: Pak Chihyo

Former name
- Hangul: 박지수
- RR: Bak Jisu
- MR: Pak Chisu

Park Ji-hyo (Korean: 박지효; born Park Ji-soo, February 1, 1997), known mononymously as Jihyo, is a South Korean singer. She is the leader and vocalist of the South Korean girl group Twice, formed by JYP Entertainment in 2015.

Jihyo released her debut extended play (EP) Zone and its lead single "Killin' Me Good" in August 2023. The EP debuted at number one on the Circle Album Chart in South Korea, selling 584,225 copies in its first week. It also debuted at number 14 on the Billboard 200 in the United States.

== Early life and education ==
Jihyo was born on February 1, 1997, in Guri, Gyeonggi Province, South Korea, as Park Ji-soo. She has two younger sisters: Park Ji-young, better known by her stage name Lee Ha-eum, is an actress and model, and Park Seo-yeon, is a member of the girl group Tuide. She graduated from Chungdam High School.

== Career ==
=== 2005–2015: Pre-debut activities ===
SM Entertainment scouted Jihyo after she placed second in a child star contest on Junior Naver. After a year of training at SM Entertainment, the employee who scouted her transferred to JYP Entertainment, and Jihyo followed suit. She joined JYP Entertainment in 2005 at the age of eight and trained for ten years, during which she became the face of Innisfree's teen line with boy band Boyfriend, and trained with K-pop acts such as Wonder Girls' Sunmi and Hyerim, Bae Suzy, Jo Kwon, and Nichkhun.

In 2014, Jihyo was set to debut in a six-member girl group called 6Mix with now-Twice members Nayeon, Jeongyeon and Sana, but the project was cancelled when two members left JYP Entertainment. The following year, she joined the reality television show Sixteen, a competition to select the founding members of Twice. She legally changed her name to Park Ji-hyo before the competition. As one of nine successful participants, she went on to join the newly formed girl group Twice, and was voted by her bandmates as leader in an anonymous vote.

=== 2015–present: Debut with Twice and solo activities ===
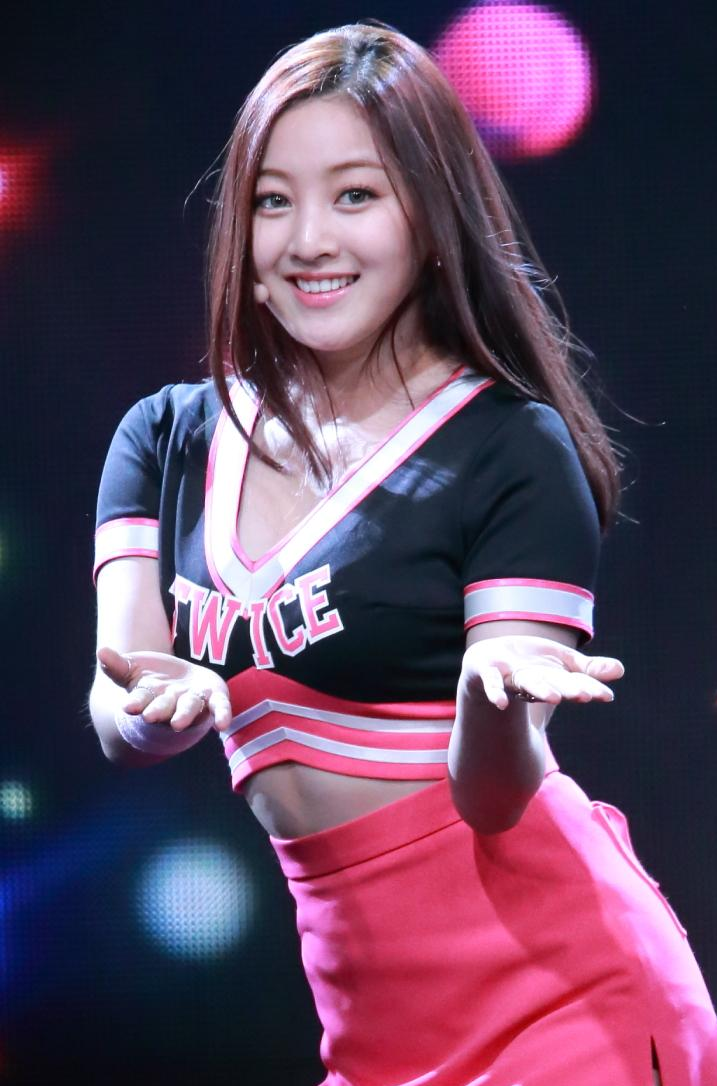
Jihyo in 2015 at the Golden Glove Awards.

In October 2015, Twice officially debuted with the release of their first extended play (EP), The Story Begins. Its lead single "Like Ooh-Ahh" became the first K-pop debut song to reach 100 million views on YouTube.

On March 6, 2022, Jihyo released her first soundtrack song, "Stardust Love Song", for tvN's Twenty-Five Twenty-One. She released her second soundtrack song titled "I Fly" for SBS's Today's Webtoon on July 29. On November 14, she released her third soundtrack track, "A Strange Day", for the Genie TV and ENA series Summer Strike.

In June 2023, it was announced that Jihyo would release her first EP, Zone, on August 18, with "Killin' Me Good" serving as the lead single, marking the second member of Twice to make a solo debut. Before this announcement, Jihyo performed an unreleased track from the EP, "Nightmare", on Twice's Ready to Be World Tour. The EP served as an R&B record that incorporates multiple genres. It went on to sell over half a million copies in the first week. On August 25, she achieved her first music show win as a soloist on KBS2's Music Bank. Jihyo appeared in several episodes of the variety show I Live Alone in 2023, which earned her a Rookie Award nomination at the 2023 MBC Entertainment Awards. She was also nominated for Best Dance Performance (Female Solo) and Best Female Artist at the 2023 MAMA Awards.

On June 20, 2025, Jihyo along with fellow members Jeongyeon and Chaeyoung released "Takedown", the lead single of the Netflix animated musical fantasy film KPop Demon Hunters. "Takedown" earned Jihyo her first solo entry on the US Billboard Hot 100 when it debuted at number 86 on the chart dated July 10, 2025. It later reached a peak position of number 50 on the chart. On June 28, Jihyo released the song "New Days" for the soundtrack of the Japanese television drama adaptation of Marry My Husband.

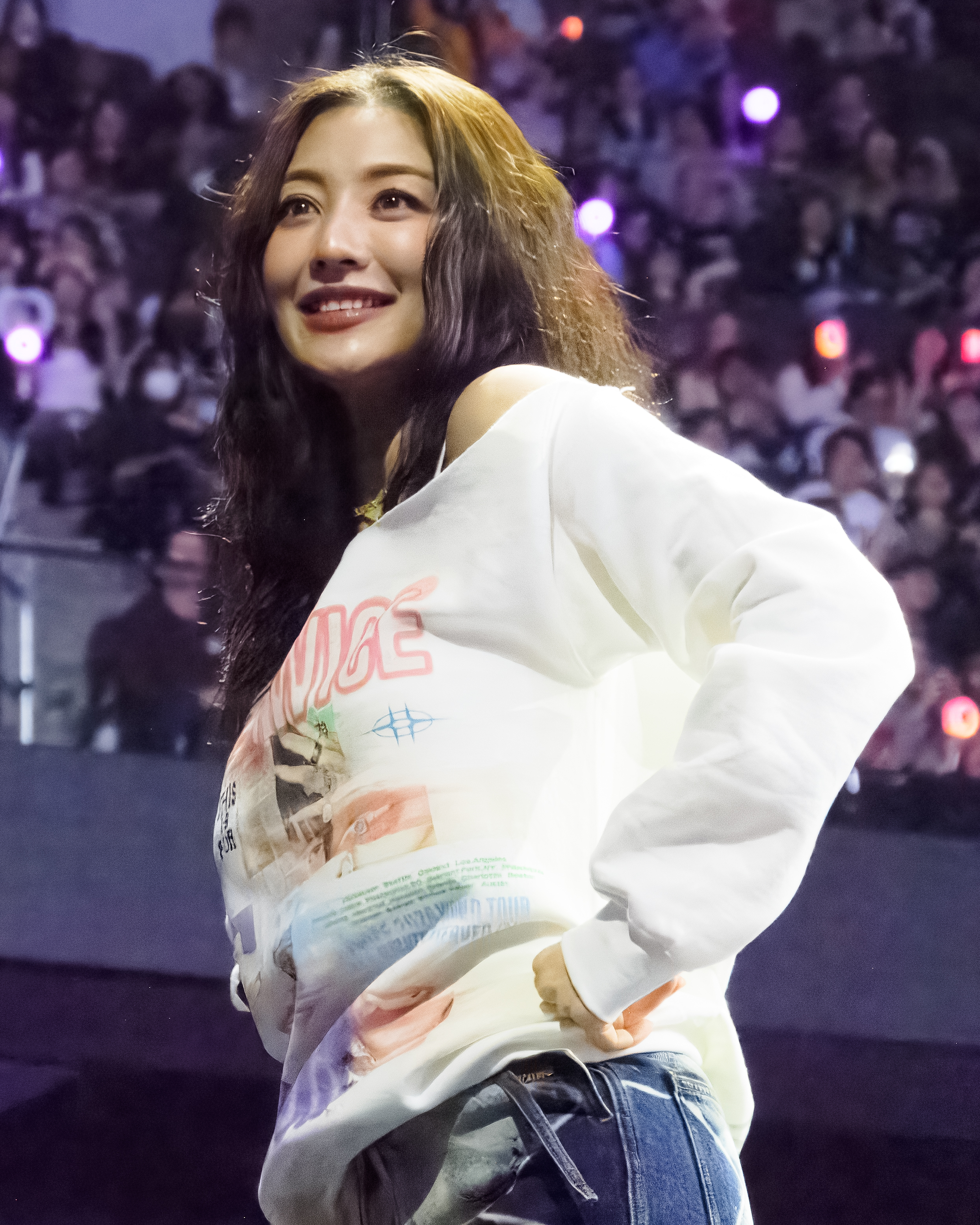
Jihyo performing on the "This Is For World Tour" in Seattle in January 2026

On May 8, 2026, Jihyo featured on American R&B singer Jenevieve's single "Hvnly", a remix of her earlier song "Hvn High". Jihyo also appeared in the song's music video. On July 10, Jihyo released the single "Distant Lover", a collaboration with Jamaican singer Shenseea. Jihyo announced her departure from JYP Entertainment in October 2026 after 21 years with the company. She will remain as a member of Twice, and is establishing her own label, named Emithaus.

== Endorsements ==
In January 2023, Jihyo was announced as the brand model for the South Korean cosmetics brand Milk Touch. In June 2024, Jihyo attended AMI Paris Spring Summer 2025 as an ambassador. In September 2025, Jihyo and bandmate Tzuyu were announced as brand ambassadors for Pond's Philippines. In January 2026, she was selected as the new model for the lingerie brand Venus.

== Public image ==
According to the Korean Business Research Institute's monthly "Individual Girl Group Members Brand Power Ranking", Jihyo placed second and third in the November 2018 and May 2019 searches.

Jihyo has drawn attention for her key role as both the leader and vocalist of Twice, with critics describing her as a "powerhouse vocalist" and praising her "impressive vocal range" and "powerful stage presence".

== Discography ==
=== Extended plays ===
List of extended plays, showing selected details, chart positions, sales and certifications
Title	Details	Peak chart positions						Sales	Certifications
Title	Details	KOR	JPN	JPN Comb	JPN Hot	US	US World	Sales	Certifications
Zone	Released: August 18, 2023; Label: JYP, Republic; Formats: CD, LP, digital download, streaming	1	11	13	18	14	2	KOR: 589,245; JPN: 14,003; US: 41,000	KMCA: 2× Platinum

=== Singles ===
==== As lead artist ====
List of singles as lead artist, showing year released, selected chart positions, certifications and album name
Title	Year	Peak chart positions										Certifications	Album
Title	Year	KOR	AUS	CAN	NZ	SGP	TWN	UK	US	US World	WW	Certifications	Album
"Killin' Me Good"	2023	148	—	—	— (Note: "Killin' Me Good" did not enter the NZ Singles Chart, but peaked at number 21 on the NZ Hot Singles Chart.)	27	12	—	—	7	193		Zone
"Takedown" (with Jeongyeon and Chaeyoung of Twice)	2025	38	28	45	29	22	15	24	50	—	30	BPI: Silver; RMNZ: Gold	KPop Demon Hunters
"Follow Me" (with French Montana, Ludmilla, Adriana C, and RedOne)	2026	—	—	—	—	—	—	—	—	—	—		Non-album singles
"Distant Lover" (with Shenseea)	2026	— (Note: "Distant Lover" did not enter the Circle Digital Chart, but peaked at number 117 on the Download Chart.)	—	—	—	—	—	—	—	—	—		Non-album singles
"—" denotes a recording that did not chart or was not released in that territory.

==== As featured artist ====
List of singles as featured artist, showing year released and album name
Title	Year	Album
"Hvnly" (Jenevieve featuring Jihyo)	2026	Crysalis (Coda)

=== Soundtrack appearances ===
List of soundtrack appearances, showing year released and album name
Title	Year	Peak chart positions		Album
Title	Year	KOR	KOR Hot	Album
"Stardust Love Song"	2022	103	71	Twenty-Five Twenty-One (Original Soundtrack)
"I Fly"	2022	— (Note: "I Fly" did not enter the Circle Digital Chart, but peaked at number 99 on the component Download Chart.)	—	Today's Webtoon (Original Soundtrack)
"A Strange Day" (이상한 하루)	2022	— (Note: "A Strange Day" did not enter the Circle Digital Chart, but peaked at number 121 on the component Download Chart.)	—	Summer Strike (Original Soundtrack)
"New Days"	2025	—	—	Marry My Husband Japan (Original Soundtrack)
"—" denotes a recording that did not chart or was not released in that territory.

=== Other charted songs ===
List of other charted songs, showing year released, selected chart positions and album name
Title	Year	Peak chart positions			Album
Title	Year	KOR	NZ Hot	US World	Album
"What Makes Me Beautiful?" (내가 예뻐진 이유) (with Ben and Jung Eun-ji)	2016	97	—	—	Inkigayo Music Crush Pt. 1
"I'll Show You" (with Nayeon, Sana, Chaeyoung, Bekuh Boom and Annika Wells as K/DA)	2020	—	38	10	All Out
"Talkin' About It" (featuring 24kGoldn)	2023	— (Note: "Talkin' About It" (featuring 24kGoldn) did not enter the Circle Digital Chart, but peaked at number 68 on the Download Chart.)	—	—	Zone
"Closer"	2023	— (Note: "Closer" did not enter the Circle Digital Chart, but peaked at number 74 on the Download Chart.)	—	—	Zone
"Wishing On You"	2023	— (Note: "Wishing On You" did not enter the Circle Digital Chart, but peaked at number 78 on the Download Chart.)	—	—	Zone
"Don't Wanna Go Back" (Duet with Heize)	2023	— (Note: "Dont Wanna Go Back" did not enter the Circle Digital Chart, but peaked at number 67 on the Download Chart.)	—	—	Zone
"Room"	2023	— (Note: "Room" did not enter the Circle Digital Chart, but peaked at number 81 on the Download Chart.)	—	—	Zone
"Nightmare"	2023	— (Note: "Nightmare" did not enter the Circle Digital Chart, but peaked at number 77 on the Download Chart.)	—	—	Zone
"ATM" (Note: credited to Twice, but the track is a solo by Jihyo)	2025	— (Note: "ATM" did not enter the Circle Digital Chart, but peaked at number 89 on the Download Chart.)	—	—	Ten: The Story Goes On
"—" denotes a recording that did not chart or was not released in that territory

=== Guest appearances ===
List of non-single guest appearances, showing year released and album name
Title	Year	Album
"Daring Woman" (당돌한 여자) (with Nayeon, Tzuyu and Chaeyoung)	2015	Two Yoo Project – Sugar Man Pt. 11

=== Songwriting credits ===
All song credits are adapted from the Korea Music Copyright Association's database unless stated otherwise.

List of songs, showing year released, artist name, and album name
Title	Year	Artist	Album	Composer	Lyricist
"Eye Eye Eyes"	2017	Twice	Signal	No	Yes
"24/7"	2017	Twice	Twicetagram	No	Yes
"HO! "	2018	Twice	What Is Love?	No	Yes
"Sunset"	2018	Twice	Yes or Yes	No	Yes
"Girls Like Us"	2019	Twice	Fancy You	No	Yes
"Get Loud"	2019	Twice	Feel Special	No	Yes
"21:29"	2019	Twice	Feel Special	No	Yes
"Up No More"	2020	Twice	Eyes Wide Open	No	Yes
"First Time"	2021	Twice	Taste of Love	No	Yes
"Real You"	2021	Twice	Formula of Love: O+T=<3	No	Yes
"Cactus" (선인장)	2021	Twice	Formula of Love: O+T=<3	Yes	Yes
"Celebrate"	2022	Twice	Celebrate	No	Yes
"Trouble"	2022	Twice	Between 1&2	Yes	Yes
"Talkin' About It"	2023	Jihyo featuring 24kGoldn	Zone	Yes	No
"Closer"	2023	Herself	Zone	No	Yes
"Wishing on You"	2023	Herself	Zone	No	Yes
"Don't Wanna Go Back"	2023	Jihyo and Heize	Zone	Yes	Yes
"Room"	2023	Herself	Zone	Yes	Yes
"Nightmare"	2023	Herself	Zone	Yes	Yes
"Mamushi (Remix)"	2024	Megan Thee Stallion (featuring Twice)	Megan: Act II	No	Yes
"Like 1"	2025	Twice	Enemy	No	Yes
"Me+You"	2025	Twice	Ten: The Story Goes On	No	Yes

== Videography ==
=== Music videos ===
Title	Year	Director(s)	Ref.
"Killin' Me Good"	2023	Kim Hyunsoo (Segaji Video)	

== Filmography ==
=== Television shows ===
Year	Title	Role	Ref.
2015	Sixteen	Contestant	

=== Web shows ===
Year	Title	Role	Notes	Ref.
2024–2025	Seibja (세입자)	Host	YouTube travel show	

== Bibliography ==
=== Photobooks ===
Title	Release date	Publisher	Ref.
Yes, I am Jihyo.	August 20, 2021	JYP Entertainment	

== Awards and nominations ==
Name of the award ceremony, year presented, category, nominee of the award, and the result of the nomination
Award ceremony	Year	Category	Nominee / Work	Result	Ref.
APAN Star Awards	2022	Best Original Soundtrack	"Stardust Love Song"	Nominated	
Asia Artist Awards	2023	Popularity Award – Singer (Female)	Jihyo	Nominated	
Asia Artist Awards	2024	Popularity Award – Singer (Female)	Jihyo	Nominated	
Asia Artist Awards	2025	Popularity Award – Solo (Female)	Jihyo	Nominated	
Asia Star Entertainer Awards	2024	The Best Solo Award	Jihyo	Won	
The Fact Music Awards	2023	Best Music – Fall	"Killin' Me Good"	Nominated	
Hanteo Music Awards	2024	Artist of the Year (Bonsang)	Jihyo	Nominated	
MAMA Awards	2023	Album of the Year	Zone	Longlisted	
MAMA Awards	2023	Artist of the Year	Jihyo	Longlisted	
MAMA Awards	2023	Best Dance Performance Female Solo	"Killin' Me Good"	Nominated	
MAMA Awards	2023	Best Female Artist	Jihyo	Nominated	
MAMA Awards	2023	Song of the Year	"Killin' Me Good"	Longlisted	
MBC Entertainment Awards	2023	Rookie Award – Variety Show (Female)	Jihyo; I Live Alone	Nominated	
Seoul Music Awards	2024	Main Award (Bonsang)	Jihyo	Nominated	
Seoul Music Awards	2024	Hallyu Special Award	Jihyo	Nominated	
Seoul Music Awards	2024	Popularity Award	Jihyo	Nominated	
