= Killin' Me Good =

2023 song by Jihyo

- English version artwork

Single by Jihyo

from the EP Zone
- Language: Korean
- Released: August 18, 2023
- Studio: JYPE Studio (Seoul)
- Genre: R&B; dance
- Length: 3:05
- Label: JYP; Republic
- Composers: Melanie Fontana; Marucs Lomax; GG Ramirez; Lindgren
- Lyricist: J.Y. Park "The Asiansoul"
- Producers: Lindgren; Hae Sol Hae; J.Y. Park "The Asiansoul"

Music video
- Killin' Me Good on YouTube

"Killin' Me Good" is a song recorded by South Korean singer Jihyo for her debut extended play, Zone. It was released as the lead single by JYP Entertainment and Republic Records on August 18, 2023. An English version of the song was released on September 15, 2023. The song peaked at number 193 on the Billboard Global 200 and number 148 on South Korea's Circle Digital Chart. In the United States, it peaked at number seven on the Billboard World Digital Song Sales chart.

== Background and release ==
On June 5, 2023, JYP Entertainment announced Jihyo would be releasing her debut extended play titled Zone on August 18. Two consecutive spoilers of "Killin' Me Good" were revealed on July 29 and 30 respectively, showing the song's music production using Pro Tools. On July 31, JYP Entertainment revealed the EP's tracklist and released a third spoiler of "Killin' Me Good" with Jihyo humming the tune of the song at a home recording studio.

== Composition ==
"Killin' Me Good" is a rhythmical and groovy R&B and dance number focused on showing "Jihyo as herself", with lyrical content that narrates the ups and downs of a relationship that goes from "beautiful beginnings to a bitter break-up". In terms of musical notation, it was composed in the key of F Major, with a tempo of 112 beats per minute.

== Promotion ==
Jihyo performed the song for the first time on KBS2's Music Bank on August 18, 2023, followed by SBS' Inkigayo on August 20.

== Reception ==
"Killin' Me Good" secured the first-place trophy on Music Bank on August 25, 2023. It also earned the 11th spot on Dazed's list of the "Top 50 Best K-pop Tracks of 2023," praising Jihyo's delivery, production, and lyrics.

Award and nominations for "Killin' Me Good"
Year	Organization	Award	Result	Ref.
2023	The Fact Music Awards	Best Music – Fall	Nominated	
2023	MAMA Awards	Best Dance Performance Female Solo	Nominated	
2023	MAMA Awards	Song of the Year	Longlisted	

== Credits and personnel ==
Credits adapted from EP's liner notes and Tidal.

=== Studio ===
- JYPE Studio – recording, digital editing
- 821 Sound – mastering
- GLAB Studio – mixing

=== Personnel ===
- Jihyo – vocals
- J.Y Park – lyrics, arrangement, record producer
- Melanie Fontana – background vocals, composition
- Marcus Lomax– composition
- Lindgren – composition, arrangement, record producer
- Hae Sol Hae – arrangement, record producer
- Earattack – vocal directing, recording
- Lee Sangyeop – recording, digital editing
- Lee Kyungwon – digital editing
- Lim Chanmi – recording
- Lee Taeseop – mixing
- Shin Bong-won – mixing
- Kwon Namwoo – mastering

== Charts ==
Chart performance for "Killin' Me Good"
Chart (2023)	Peak position
Global 200 (Billboard)	193
Japan Heatseekers (Billboard Japan)	4
New Zealand Hot Singles (RMNZ)	21
Singapore (RIAS)	27
South Korea (Circle)	148
Taiwan (Billboard)	12
US World Digital Song Sales (Billboard)	7

== Release history ==
Release history for "Killin' Me Good"
Region	Date	Format(s)	Version	Label
Various	August 18, 2023	Digital download; streaming	Original	JYP; Republic
Various	September 15, 2023	Digital download; streaming	English	JYP; Republic

== See also ==
- List of Music Bank Chart winners (2023)
