= The Girls (Blackpink song) =

- Digital cover

Single by Blackpink
- Released: August 25, 2023
- Studio: The Black Label (Seoul)
- Genre: EDM; trap
- Length: 2:42
- Label: YG; TakeOne
- Songwriters: Ryan Tedder; Jennie; Michel 'Lindgren' Schulz; Melanie Fontana; Rosé; Madison Love; Danny Chung
- Producers: Ryan Tedder; Lindgren

Blackpink singles chronology
"Shut Down" (2022)	"The Girls" (2023)	"Jump" (2025)

Music video
- "The Girls" on YouTube

"The Girls" is a song recorded by South Korean girl group Blackpink for the original soundtrack of the mobile game Blackpink: The Game. It was first made available in the game on August 23, 2023, before it was officially released two days later, through YG Entertainment and TakeOne Company. Written by various contributors, including the track producers Ryan Tedder and Lindgren along with group members Jennie and Rosé, it is a trap and EDM song driven by hip-hop rhythmic elements over Turkish flute sounds, with lyrics that discuss the importance of being independent and courageous in life. The song peaked at number 69 on the Billboard Global 200 and reached the top 10 in Vietnam. A physical version was also released on the same day, which peaked at number one on the Circle Album Chart with 160,460 sales in the first week.

== Background ==
On April 4, 2023, YG Entertainment revealed that the mobile game Blackpink: The Game would be launching in the second quarter of 2023, as well as an original soundtrack and music video accompanying it. Developed by TakeOne Company, the game officially launched on May 18 on mobile app platforms. The same day, a music video teaser was released, confirming the soundtrack's title to be "The Girls" and revealing a snippet of the song as animated avatars of the Blackpink members danced to it. Record producer Ryan Tedder, who worked with Blackpink on "Bet You Wanna" (2020), posted a teaser of "The Girls" on his social media handles, confirming his involvement on the song. In 2022, Tedder had confirmed in an interview with Good Morning America that he had written songs with members Jennie and Rosé for their upcoming album, describing the process as very much Blackpink's work with him supporting and contributing, though none of his songs ultimately ended up on Born Pink (2022).

== Release ==
Initially planned to be released simultaneously with the game release, the song and its music video were indefinitely delayed due to work on presenting the "highest-quality content" for the video taking "longer than expected." On July 4, the game team released a statement apologizing for the delay and announcing that the music video would be released in the game within a month. On August 3, they announced the official release date of "The Girls" in the game to be August 23. TakeOne Company also announced that a physical package, available in "Stella" and "Reve" versions and containing a QR code to download the song and lyrics, would be released two days later. On social media, the song's producer Ryan Tedder confirmed that "The Girls" would be introduced to streaming platforms as well as radio upon release. The song and its music video premiered in Blackpink: The Game on August 23, accompanied by a viewing party hosted on Blackpink's YouTube channel in which the group play several games and react to the video. Following the premiere, YG Entertainment announced with a teaser poster that "The Girls" would be officially released as a digital single on August 25. The song was sent for radio airplay in Italy on September 8.

== Music and lyrics ==
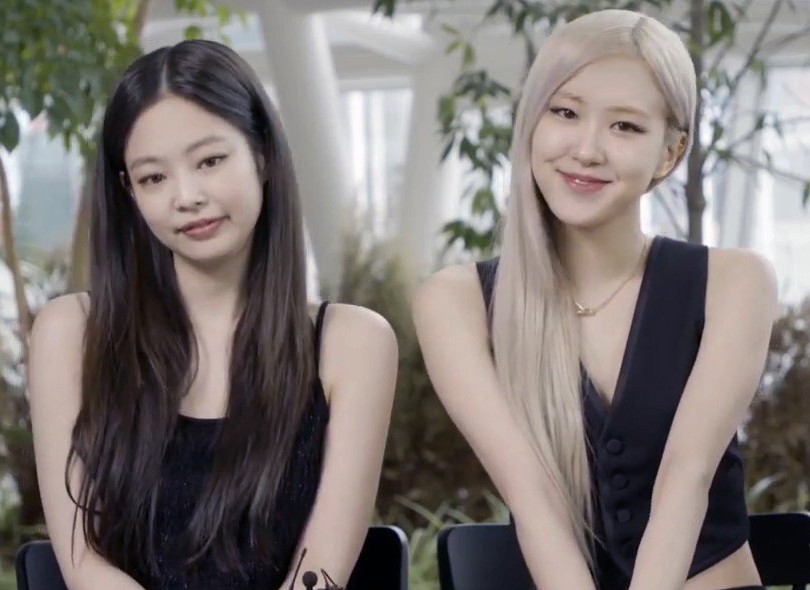
"The Girls" features songwriting contributions from Blackpink members Jennie (left) and Rosé (right).

"The Girls" serves as the soundtrack for the group's mobile game Blackpink: The Game, written and composed by Ryan Tedder alongside group members Jennie and Rosé with their frequent collaborator Danny Chung, in addition to Melanie Fontana, Michel 'Lindgren' Schulz, and Madison Love. It is an EDM and trap-based track that features hip-hop-leaning beats and a Turkish flute sound throughout the song. Its lyrics revolve around "the importance of being independent and courageous."

== Music video ==
On May 18, 2023, a 22-second music video teaser for "The Girls" was released, featuring a snippet of the song with the refrain "Don't mess with the girls." The music video was released on August 23 in Blackpink: The Game and on August 25 in Blackpink's YouTube channel. In the video, animated avatars of the Blackpink members are depicted singing and performing choreography to the song.

== Commercial performance ==
The physical version of "The Girls" debuted at number one on the Circle Album Chart dated August 20–26, 2023 with 160,460 copies sold in the first week, becoming Blackpink's fifth number-one album on the chart. It debuted at number 13 on the monthly chart with 178,360 copies sold. It sold a total of 191,610 copies in 2023.

== Accolades ==
Award and nominations for "The Girls"
Year	Organization	Award	Result	Ref.
2023	Asian Pop Music Awards	Best Arranger (Overseas) (Note: Arrangers: Ryan Tedder and Lindgren)	Won	
2023	Asian Pop Music Awards	Top 20 Songs of the Year (Overseas)	Won	
2023	Asian Pop Music Awards	Song of the Year (Overseas)	Nominated	

== Charts ==
=== Weekly charts ===
Weekly chart performance for "The Girls"
Chart (2023)	Peak position
Global 200 (Billboard)	69
Malaysia (Billboard)	17
New Zealand Hot Singles (RMNZ)	10
Singapore (RIAS)	16
South Korea BGM (Circle)	57
South Korea Download (Circle)	34
South Korean Albums (Circle)	1
UK Singles Downloads (OCC)	57
UK Singles Sales (OCC)	62
US Digital Song Sales (Billboard)	39
Vietnam Hot 100 (Billboard)	7

=== Monthly charts ===
Monthly chart performance for "The Girls"
Chart (2023)	Position
South Korean Albums (Circle)	13

== Certifications ==
Region	Certification	Certified units/sales
Brazil (Pro-Música Brasil)	Platinum	40,000^{‡}
South Korea Physical album	—	191,610
^{‡} Sales+streaming figures based on certification alone.

== Release history ==
Release dates and formats for "The Girls"
Region	Date	Format(s)	Label	Ref.
Various	August 25, 2023	Digital download; streaming	YG; TakeOne	
Various	August 25, 2023	Cassette	YG; TakeOne	
Italy	September 8, 2023	Radio airplay	Universal	

== See also ==
- List of Circle Album Chart number ones of 2023
- List of K-pop songs on the Billboard charts
