= Jenevieve =

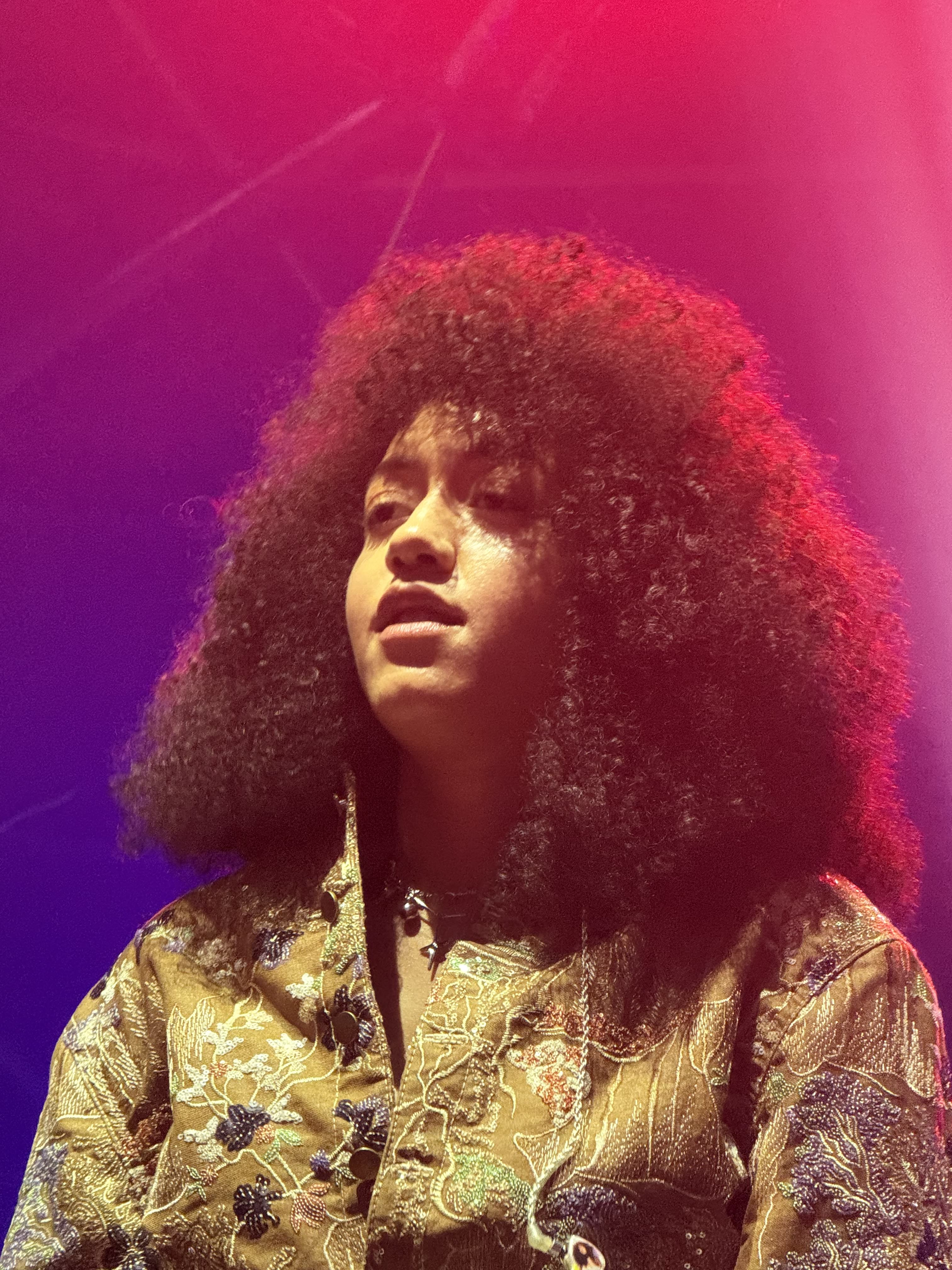
- Jenevieve in 2026

Background information
- Born: Jenevieve Johnson; January 30, 1998 (age 28); Miami, Florida, U.S.
- Origin: Los Angeles, California
- Genres: Alternative R&B; pop; soul
- Occupations: Singer; songwriter
- Years active: 2020–present
- Labels: Joyface; Interscope

Jenevieve Johnson (born January 30, 1998), known mononymously as Jenevieve, is an American singer and songwriter known for her genre-blending sound that fuses elements of R&B, pop, soul, and disco. She rose to prominence with her breakout single "Baby Powder" in 2020 and has since released two critically acclaimed albums, Division (2021) and Crysalis (2025).

== Early life ==
Jenevieve was born in Miami, Florida, and is of Cuban and Bahamian descent. She was raised in a family with a strong background in dance—both her mother and grandmother were ballet dancers. At the age of 13, she expressed her desire to pursue music professionally, prompting her mother to take her to a recording studio. After recording a demo, she caught the attention of an engineer at Interscope Records, which helped launch her career.

== Career ==
=== 2020–2021: Breakthrough and Division ===
Jenevieve made her official debut in February 2020 with the single "Medallion," followed by the viral hit "Baby Powder" in March. The latter garnered millions of streams and landed on major playlists, establishing her as a rising star in the R&B scene. These tracks were later included in her debut album, Division, released in 2021.

=== 2025: Crysalis ===
In 2025, Jenevieve released her sophomore album, Crysalis, marking a new chapter in her artistic journey. The 14-track album, produced in collaboration with Elijah Gabor, explores themes of self-discovery, resilience, and creative freedom. The project was accompanied by a visual for the single "Hvn High" and a private release event in Los Angeles.

== Reception ==
Mic Drop Music described her music as "smooth, silky vocals layered over nostalgic old-school grooves" and added, "Her artistry reawakens the passion for R&B’s golden era while staying grounded in the now." New Wave Magazine said "sound is a distinct pop-ish R&B, which is playful and cute." Reviewing her 'Waiting Room' single, Clash Music said, "This time Jenevieve's sound has a more pronounced programmed RnB sheen; her interior, intimate notes and breezy delivery interplaying organically with Ward's fluid style. The Bangkok Post described her as "one of the most compelling new voices in contemporary R&B." Rolling Stone described her Division album as "one of the year’s breeziest R&B albums, full of strutting bass lines and sly, affecting hooks."

== Discography ==
=== Studio albums ===
- Division (2021)
- Crysalis (2025)

=== EPs ===
- Rendezvous (2022)

=== Singles ===
- "Medallion" (2020)
- "Baby Powder" (2020)
- "Eternal" (2020)
- "Midnight Charm" (2021)
- "Haiku" (2025)
- "Hvn High" (2025)
- "Head Over Heels" (2025)
- "Waiting Room" (2026)
