= Evnne =

South Korean boy band

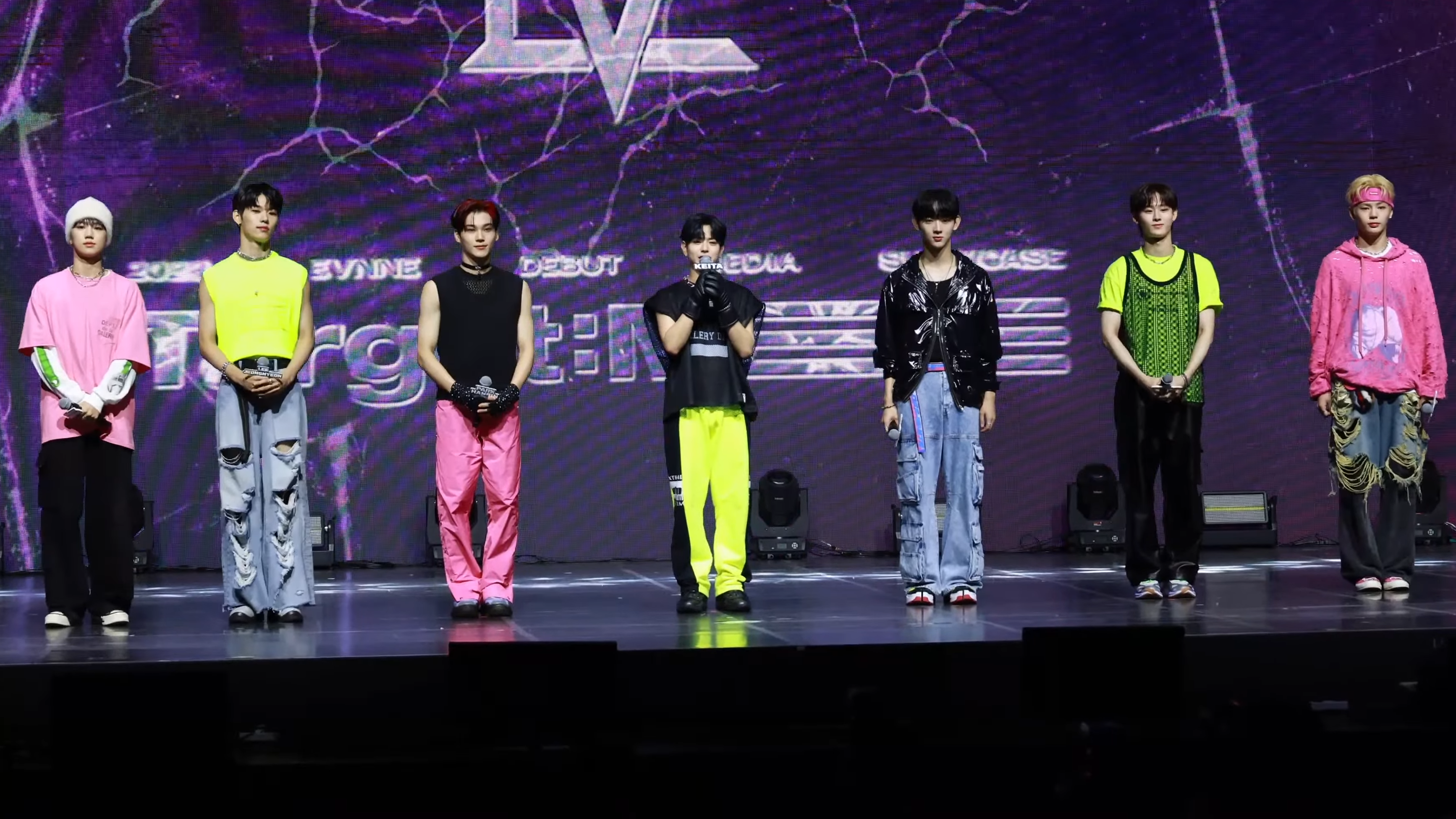
- Evnne in 2023; From L–R: Park Ji-hoo, Lee Jeong-hyeon, Park Han-bin, Keita, Yoo Seung-eon, Ji Yun-seo, and Mun Jung-hyun

Background information
- Also known as: Evening's Newest Etoiles
- Origin: Seoul, South Korea
- Years active: 2023–present
- Label: Jellyfish
- Members: Keita; Park Han-bin; Lee Jeong-hyeon; Mun Jung-hyun; Park Ji-hoo
- Past members: Yoo Seung-eon; Ji Yun-seo

Evnne (Korean: 이븐; RR: Ibeun; stylized in all caps) is a South Korean boy band consists of five members: Keita, Park Han-bin, Lee Jeong-hyeon, Mun Jung-hyun, and Park Ji-hoo. They debuted on September 19, 2023, with the extended play (EP) Target: Me.

Originally formed by Jellyfish Entertainment as a seven-member project group with members who previously participated in Mnet's 2023 survival show Boys Planet, Yoo Seung-eon and Ji Yun-seo left the group in December 2025 due to the expiry of their contracts. The remaining five members renewed their contracts with Jellyfish, leading them to become a permanent group.

== Career ==
=== Pre-debut, participation in Boys Planet, and formation ===
In 2023, Mnet aired the reality competition show Boys Planet, which saw 98 contestants from various backgrounds compete to become part of a temporary boy band under WakeOne. At the show's conclusion, nine contestants were selected to form the lineup of Zerobaseone, which debuted on July 10. Four members of Evnne made it to the Top 18 of the show's finale but were unable to debut in the final lineup, which included Park Han-bin, Keita, Lee Jeong-hyeon, and Yoo Seung-eon, who placed 11th, 12th, 15th, and 16th, respectively. The remaining members who would make up the group are Mun Jung-hyun, Park Ji-hoo, and Ji Yun-seo who were eliminated in the second round of the show, placing 29th, 33rd, and 41st, respectively.

Later, on August 3, Jellyfish Entertainment announced that seven eliminated contestants from the show, following discussions between the trainees' companies—WakeOne, Yuehua Entertainment, and Rain Company—would debut under the agency in the second half of 2023 as the boy band BLIT. The agency explained that the group's name is an acronym for "Boldly Leaping into Tomorrow", adding that the group promises to "break boundaries as artists". Following concerns regarding the potential misinterpretations of the group's name, Jellyfish renamed the group to "Evnne" following consultations with the members. The agency explained that the name was derived from combining "unusual words" that mean "Evening's Newest Etoiles", which represents a "new rising star in the night sky".

The group's lineup includes several members with prior experience in the entertainment industry ahead of their participation on Boys Planet. In 2021, Keita debuted as part of the boy band Ciipher under Rain Company, while Park Han-bin competed on SBS TV's Loud before joining WakeOne as a trainee.

=== 2023–2025: Debut with Target: Me, Un: Seen, Ride or Die, Hot Mess, Love Anecdote(s), re-organization ===
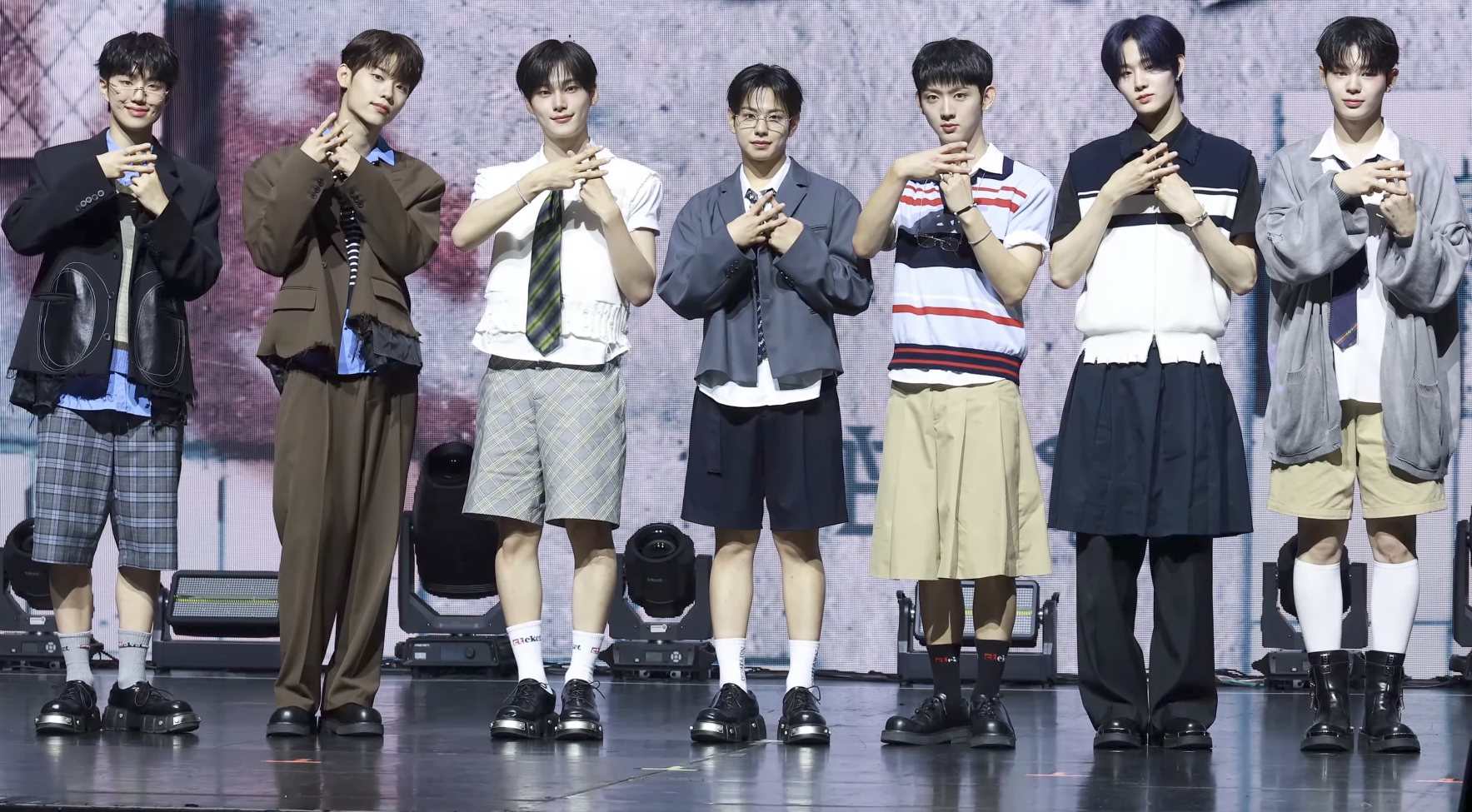
Evnne at the showcase for Ride or Die in 2024

On August 16, 2023, it was announced that Evnne would make their debut on September 19, with the EP Target: Me and its lead single "Trouble". The group released their second EP Un: Seen on January 22, 2024. The EP's lead single "Ugly" won the group's first music show win on Show Champion on January 31. Evnne released their third EP Ride or Die on June 17, 2024 with the lead single "Badder Love". On September 7, 2024, at the 7th The Fact Music Awards, Evnne won the Global Hot Trend Award, together with another group, N.SSign. Evnne released their fourth EP entitled Hot Mess on February 10, 2025 and their fifth EP, Love Anecdote(s), on August 4, 2025.

On December 8, Jellyfish announced that members Yoo Seung-eon and Ji Yun-seo will leave the group after the expiry of their contracts with the company on December 31, and return to their parent company YH Entertainment, while the remaining 5 members signed exclusive contracts with Jellyfish and will continue their group activities permanently in 2026.

=== 2026–present: Five-member redebut with Backtalk ===
Evnne released their first single album, Backtalk, on April 20, 2026, marking their first release as a five-member group. All members co-wrote the title track. The track gained attention for lyrics referencing their time on Boys Planet, as well as the various entertainment companies that the members have worked under.

== Members ==
=== Current ===
- Keita (佳汰; 케이타) – leader
- Park Han-bin (박한빈)
- Lee Jeong-hyeon (이정현)
- Mun Jung-hyun (문정현)
- Park Ji-hoo (박지후)

=== Former ===
- Yoo Seung-eon (유승언) (2023–2025)
- Ji Yun-seo (지윤서) (2023–2025)

== Discography ==
=== Extended plays ===
List of EPs, showing selected details, selected chart positions, and sales figures
Title	Details	Peak chart positions			Sales	Certifications
Title	Details	KOR	JPN	JPN Hot	Sales	Certifications
Target: Me	Released: September 19, 2023; Labels: Jellyfish, Genie Music, Stone Music; Formats: CD, digital download, streaming	1	6	54	KOR: 264,193; JPN: 33,114	KMCA: Platinum
Un: Seen	Released: January 22, 2024; Labels: Jellyfish, Genie Music, Stone Music; Formats: CD, digital download, streaming	2	7	85	KOR: 190,934; JPN: 24,413	
Ride or Die	Released: June 17, 2024; Labels: Jellyfish, Genie Music, Stone Music; Formats: CD, digital download, streaming	7	4	99	KOR: 207,422; JPN: 26,944	
Hot Mess	Released: February 10, 2025; Labels: Jellyfish, Genie Music, Stone Music; Formats: CD, digital download, streaming	2	11	—	KOR: 209,187; JPN: 15,738	
Love Anecdote(s)	Released: August 4, 2025; Labels: Jellyfish, Genie Music, Stone Music; Formats: CD, digital download, streaming	1	9	—	KOR: 167,457; JPN: 18,098	
On: Our Noise	Released: October 19, 2026; Labels: Jellyfish, Genie Music, Stone Music; Formats: CD, digital download, streaming	10	—	—	KOR: 118,289	

=== Single albums ===
List of single albums, showing selected details, selected chart positions, and sales figures
Title	Details	Peak chart positions	Sales
Title	Details	KOR	Sales
Backtalk (뱉어)	Released: April 20, 2026; Label: Jellyfish, Genie Music, Stone Music; Formats: CD, digital download, streaming	4	KOR: 145,736

=== Singles ===
==== Korean singles ====
List of Korean singles, showing year released, chart positions and name of the album
Title	Year	Peak chart positions	Album
Title	Year	KOR DL	Album
"Trouble"	2023	57	Target: Me
"Ugly"	2024	8	Un: Seen
"Badder Love"	2024	11	Ride or Die
"Hot Mess"	2025	8	Hot Mess
"How Can I Do"	2025	8	Love Anecdote(s)
"Backtalk" (뱉어)	2026	19	Backtalk
"Look At Ma"	2026	22	On: Our Noise

==== Japanese singles ====
List of Japanese singles, showing year released, and name of the album
Title	Year	Album
"Keshiki" (景色)	2024	Non-album single

=== Other charted songs ===
List of songs, showing year released, chart positions and album name
Title	Year	Peak chart positions	Album
Title	Year	KOR DL	Album
"Role Model"	2023	87	Target: Me
"Pretty Thing"	2023	93	Target: Me
"Your Text"	2023	88	Target: Me
"Jukebox"	2023	89	Target: Me
"Even More"	2023	96	Target: Me
"Syrup"	2024	51	Un: Seen
"K.O. (Keep On)"	2024	50	Un: Seen
"Chase"	2024	54	Un: Seen
"Festa"	2024	53	Un: Seen
"I <3 U (I Love U)"	2024	62	Ride or Die
"XO"	2024	66	Ride or Die
"2X"	2024	70	Ride or Die
"Boom Bari"	2024	64	Ride or Die
"Birthday"	2025	89	Hot Mess
"Love Like That"	2025	90	Hot Mess
"Crown"	2025	93	Hot Mess
"Youth"	2025	92	Hot Mess
"Keshiki (Korean Ver.)"	2025	97	Hot Mess
"Dirtybop"	2025	80	Love Anecdote(s)
"Mako"	2025	78	Love Anecdote(s)
"Love Chat"	2025	79	Love Anecdote(s)
"Put It On Me"	2025	82	Love Anecdote(s)
"Newest"	2025	81	Love Anecdote(s)
"Bless"	2026	175	On: Our Noise
"Know Wassup"	2026	171	On: Our Noise
"A-ok"	2026	173	On: Our Noise
"That’s OMG"	2026	170	On: Our Noise

== Videography ==
=== Music videos ===
Title	Year	Director(s)	Ref.
"Trouble"	2023	Guzza, Kim Joohun (Kudo)	
"UGLY"	2024	Kim Ja-kyeong (Flexible Pictures)	
"Badder Love"	2024	DQM	
"Hot Mess"	2025	Seo Hye-mi (HATTRICK)	

== Awards and nominations ==
Name of the award ceremony, year presented, award category, nominee(s) and the result of the award
Award ceremony	Year	Category	Nominee/work	Result	Ref.
Asian Pop Music Awards (Note: Hosted by the Hong Kong Asia Pacific International Group and Sunway Records, the Asian Pop Music Awards bases its winners on the "Asian Pop Music Chart" which opened in September 2019.)	2023	Best New Artist (Overseas)	Target: Me	Nominated	
Circle Chart Music Awards	2024	Rookie of the Year – Physical Album	Target: Me	Nominated	
D Awards	2025	Best Boy Group Popularity	Evnne	Nominated	
D Awards	2026	Best Group Popularity (Boy)	Evnne	Nominated	
Golden Disc Awards	2023	Rookie of the Year	Evnne	Nominated	
Hanteo Music Awards	2023	Rookie of the Year – Male	Evnne	Nominated	
Hanteo Music Awards	2024	Emerging Artist	Evnne	Won	
Hanteo Music Awards	2024	Global Artist Award	Evnne	Longlisted	
Hanteo Music Awards	2025	Emerging Artist	Evnne	Won	
Korea Grand Music Awards	2025	Best Dance Performance	"How Can I Do"	Nominated	
MAMA Awards	2023	Album of the Year	Target: Me	Longlisted	
MAMA Awards	2023	Artist of the Year	Evnne	Longlisted	
MAMA Awards	2023	Best New Male Artist	Evnne	Nominated	
MAMA Awards	2023	Worldwide Fans' Choice Top 10	Evnne	Nominated	
MAMA Awards	2024	Worldwide Fans' Choice Top 10	Evnne	Nominated	
MAMA Awards	2025	Fans' Choice Top 10 – Male	Evnne	Nominated	
MAMA Awards	2026	Fans' Choice Male	Evnne	Pending	
Newsis Hallyu Expo	2026	Hallyu Special Award	Evnne	Won	
Seoul Music Awards	2023	Rookie of the Year	Evnne	Nominated	
Seoul Music Awards	2025	Rising Star Award	Evnne	Nominated	
The Fact Music Awards	2024	Global Hot Trend Award	Evnne	Won	
Universal Superstar Awards	2024	Universal Hot Focus	Evnne	Won	
