= Target: Me =

EP by Evnne
- Released: September 19, 2023
- Genre: K-pop
- Length: 18:57
- Languages: Korean; English
- Labels: Jellyfish; Genie Music; Stone Music

Evnne chronology
Target: Me (2023)	Un: Seen (2024)

Singles from Target: Me
- 1. "Trouble" Released: September 19, 2023

Target: Me is the debut extended play by South Korean boy band Evnne, released on September 19, 2023, through Jellyfish Entertainment. It was promoted by the lead single "Trouble", released on the same date with a music video. The EP topped the Circle Album Chart and sold over 200,000 copies in its first week of release in South Korea.

== Background and composition ==
The EP was named for the band's intent to "become a target of the public's attention", with the band also saying the concept for the lead single "Trouble" was "powerful rebels who want to change the world". "Trouble" was described as having a "Baltimore club vibe" and "Role Model" a "West Coast hip hop" sound. Members Ji Yun-seo and Lee Jeong-hyeon co-wrote the lyrics for "Jukebox", while Ji and leader Keita also co-wrote "Even More".

== Track listing ==
Target: Me track listing
No.	Title	Lyrics	Music	Arrangement	Length
1.	"Trouble"	Dr.Jo; Cha Yu-bin (XYXX); Rick Bridges	Hongsamman; Hui Chang (Coke Paris); Noerio (The Hub); Jacob Aaron (The Hub); The Hub 88	Hongsamman; Hui Chang	3:26
2.	"Role Model"	Jung Ho-hyun (E.One); Yuki	Jung	Jung	3:13
3.	"Pretty Thing"	Kim Ji-hyang; Hwippi (153/Joombas); Kang Eun-jeong; Kyler Niko; Ronnie Icon	Niko; Icon; Newold	Newold	3:01
4.	"Your Text"	Choi Ji-hoon (153/Joombas)	Humbler; Ryan Curtis	Humbler	2:58
5.	"Jukebox"	Ji Yun-seo; Lee Jeong-hyeon; Lee Seu-ran	Garden; Gabriel Brandes; Ollipop	Garden	3:01
6.	"Even More"	Kim J.; Keita; Ji	Seo Jung-jin; Kim Doo-hyun; Biggyu	Seo; Kim D.	3:18
Total length:					18:57

== Charts ==
=== Weekly charts ===
Weekly chart performance for Target: Me
Chart (2023)	Peak position
Japanese Albums (Oricon)	6
Japanese Combined Albums (Oricon)	9
Japanese Hot Albums (Billboard Japan)	54
South Korean Albums (Circle)	1

=== Monthly charts ===
Monthly chart performance for Target: Me
Chart (2023)	Position
Japanese Albums (Oricon)	17
South Korean Albums (Circle)	6

=== Year-end charts ===
Year-end chart performance for Target: Me
Chart (2023)	Position
South Korean Albums (Circle)	80

== Certifications ==
Certifications for Target: Me
Region	Certification	Certified units/sales
South Korea (KMCA)	Platinum	250,000^{^}
^{^} Shipments figures based on certification alone.
