= Zone (EP) =

2023 extended play by Jihyo

- Digital cover

EP by Jihyo
- Released: August 18, 2023
- Recorded: 2022
- Studio: JYP Studios
- Genre: R&B
- Length: 21:58
- Languages: Korean; English
- Labels: JYP; Republic
- Producers: Lindgren; Hae Sol Hae; Earattack; Gongdo; Rykeyz (Ryan Williamson); Marty Maro; Shawn Wasabi; Softserveboy; Lee Woohyun

Singles from Zone
- 1. "Killin' Me Good" Released: August 18, 2023

Zone is the debut extended play (EP) by South Korean singer Jihyo of the girl group Twice. It was released on August 18, 2023, through JYP Entertainment and Republic Records. The EP contains seven tracks, including the lead single "Killin' Me Good" and six other tracks written and composed by Jihyo. The EP features collaborations with American rapper 24kGoldn and South Korean singer-songwriter Heize. It is primarily an R&B record that incorporates dance-pop, dance and ballad production with elements of Latin-inspired sounds and melodic ballads.

Domestically, Zone debuted at number one on the Circle Album Chart with half a million copies sold in the first week. Overseas, it charted in various territories, including, Japan, the United States, the United Kingdom, Hungary, France, and Germany.

== Background ==
Beginning in April 2023, prior to the EP's announcement, Jihyo performed an unreleased track, "Nightmare", on Twice's Ready to Be World Tour, leading to speculation that she would soon make a full solo debut. On June 5, 2023, Twice hinted at a mysterious project set to release in August with the text "Killin' Me Good" inscribed on the teaser image through their social media pages. Fans speculated if the teaser is related to a group comeback or the highly anticipated solo debut of Jihyo. On June 9, 2023, Twice confirmed the upcoming solo debut of Jihyo by revealing another teaser of "Killin' Me Good", accompanied by an image of Jihyo applying lipstick through the rear-view mirror. She is the second Twice member to solo debut officially, following Nayeon in June 2022. Another visualizer of Jihyo with her mouth covered with moving images was teased on June 26, 2023, officially revealing her first EP titled Zone led by the lead track "Killin' Me Good". On September 8, JYP Entertainment posted a teaser poster about Jihyo releasing an English version of "Killin' Me Good" on September 15, 2023.

== Release and promotion ==
Zone was released on August 18, 2023, via CD available in four versions including a digipack, and on streaming platforms. The pre-orders for the three-version EP began on July 18, 2023. The three versions of the EP were available at Amazon. At the same time, various album inclusions were exclusively available at Twice's online store, JYP shop, Target, Walmart, and Barnes & Noble. Meanwhile, pre-orders for the digipack version began on August 1, 2023.

On July 22, 2023, a timetable was released through Twice's social media pages indicating the rollout dates for the promotional content. Two consecutive set of spoilers of the sound "Killin' Me Good" was revealed on July 29 and 30 respectively, showing the music production of "Killin' Me Good" using Pro Tools. On July 31, 2023, JYP Entertainment revealed the EP's tracklist and released a third spoiler of "Killin' Me Good" with Jihyo humming the tune of the song at a home recording studio. On August 2, 2023, the opening trailer of Zone was unveiled. On August 11, 2023, the first album's sneak peek video was released. In said video, Jihyo went on stage and performed live snippets of each track on Zone. On August 16, 2023, a second sneak peek was unveiled. Jihyo released an English version of "Kilin' Me Good" on September 15, 2023.

== Music and lyrics ==
The album opens with the lead single "Killin' Me Good", written by Twice's longtime collaborators, Park Jin-young for the lyrics, Melanie Fontana and Lindgren for composition. It is an up‐tempo R&B and dance track, described as a song that "stands out with Jihyo's timbre over the rhythmic and groovy sound." Its lyrical content revolves around narrating the ups and downs of a relationship that goes from "beautiful beginnings to a bitter break-up." The second track, "Talkin' About It," featuring American rapper 24kGoldn, is primarily a "chic" dance-pop song that incorporates Latin elements. Third track "Closer," is an R&B pop song with a Latin-style chorus. Track four, "Wishing On You," is an R&B song characterized by a dreamy melody and "captivating vocals", with lyrics that express "the excitement and thrill" of thinking about someone all night long. The fifth track, "Don't Wanna Go Back,” a duet with South Korean singer Heize, is an "emotional" ballad and R&B song driven by an acoustic guitar and bass.

== Conception and title ==
The album name, Zone, is a combination of the alphabet Z, which refers to Jihyo (shortened to Zyo, which is seen in the album cover), and the English word One, meaning 'Jihyo's first' and 'Jihyo's complete one' work. In a Q&A with Harpers Bazaar, Jihyo explained that “the concept for [Zone] is me, showing different sides of me...I particularly chose the order of the tracks because I wanted it to tell a story of emotions, like an emotional journey throughout the day. Each track shows different vocal styles, and yes, it’s very different from Twice, but I wanted to focus on that. While the image that I built through the group really helped me identify who I am, I want to show different sides of me.” When asked about the message of the album Jihyo noted that instead of a certain message she wanted to deliver "diversity musically" while show herself as someone "who’s able to express different genres and express [herself] in new ways."

== Commercial performance ==
Zone debuted at number one on the Circle Album Chart with over half million copies sold in the first week. It broke the record for the highest initial sales volume for an extended play released by a K-pop female soloist in Hanteo chart history. In United States, the album debuted at number 14 on Billboard 200 with 41,000 copies sold, in addition, it chartered on Top Album Sales, Top Current Album Sales, Lyric Find Global, and World Album.

== Track listing ==
Zone track listing
| No. | Title | Lyrics | Music | Arrangement | Length |
|---|---|---|---|---|---|
| 1. | "Killin' Me Good" | J.Y. Park "The Asiansoul" | Marcus Lomax; Melanie Fontana; GG Ramirez; Lindgren | Lindgren; J.Y. Park "The Asiansoul" | 3:05 |
| 2. | "Talkin' About It" (featuring 24kGoldn) | Fontana; 24kGoldn | Jihyo; 24kGoldn; Earattack; Fontana; Lindgren | Earattack; Lindgren | 2:50 |
| 3. | "Closer" | Jihyo | Rykeyz; Jae Stephens; Dewain Whitmore; Marty Rod | Rykeyz; Marty Mario | 2:35 |
| 4. | "Wishing on You" | Jihyo; Young | Shawn Serrano; Softserveboy; Matthew Lewin; Mica Tenenbaum; Brandon Colbein | Softserveboy; Shawn Wasabi | 3:14 |
| 5. | "Don't Wanna Go Back" (duet with Heize) | Jihyo; Heize | Jihyo; Heize; Earattack; Nikki Flores | Earattack | 3:42 |
| 6. | "Room" | Jihyo | Jihyo; Earattack | Earattack | 2:57 |
| 7. | "Nightmare" | Jihyo | Jihyo; Earattack | Earattack | 3:35 |
| Total length: | | | | | 21:58 |

== Charts ==
=== Weekly charts ===
Weekly chart performance for Zone
| Chart (2023) | Peak position |
|---|---|
| Belgian Albums (Ultratop Flanders) | 197 |
| Belgian Albums (Ultratop Wallonia) | 40 |
| Croatian International Albums (HDU) | 4 |
| French Albums (SNEP) | 41 |
| German Albums (Offizielle Top 100) | 45 |
| Hungarian Physical Albums (MAHASZ) | 15 |
| Japanese Albums (Oricon) | 11 |
| Japanese Combined Albums (Oricon) | 13 |
| Japanese Hot Albums (Billboard Japan) | 18 |
| South Korean Albums (Circle) | 1 |
| Spanish Albums (Promusicae) | 35 |
| Swiss Albums (Schweizer Hitparade) | 79 |
| UK Album Downloads (Official Charts) | 35 |
| US Billboard 200 | 14 |
| US World Albums (Billboard) | 2 |

=== Monthly charts ===
Monthly chart performance for Zone
| Chart (2023) | Position |
|---|---|
| Japanese Albums (Oricon) | 29 |
| South Korean Albums (Circle) | 4 |

=== Year-end charts ===
Year-end chart performance for Zone
| Chart (2023) | Position |
|---|---|
| South Korean Albums (Circle) | 42 |

== Certifications and sales ==
Certifications for Zone
| Region | Certification | Certified units/sales |
|---|---|---|
| South Korea (KMCA) | 2× Platinum | 584,225 |
| United States | — | 41,000 |

== Release history ==
Release dates and formats for Zone
| Region | Date | Format | Version | Label | Ref. |
|---|---|---|---|---|---|
| Various | August 18, 2023 | CD; digital download; streaming | Z; Y; O | JYP; Republic | |
| Various | August 18, 2023 | CD | Digipack | JYP; Republic | |
| United States | August 21, 2023 | Digital album | ZYO'S ZONE | JYP; Republic | |
| United States | November 17, 2023 | Vinyl | Deep Sea; Melon | JYP; Republic | |
