= Chung Ha discography =

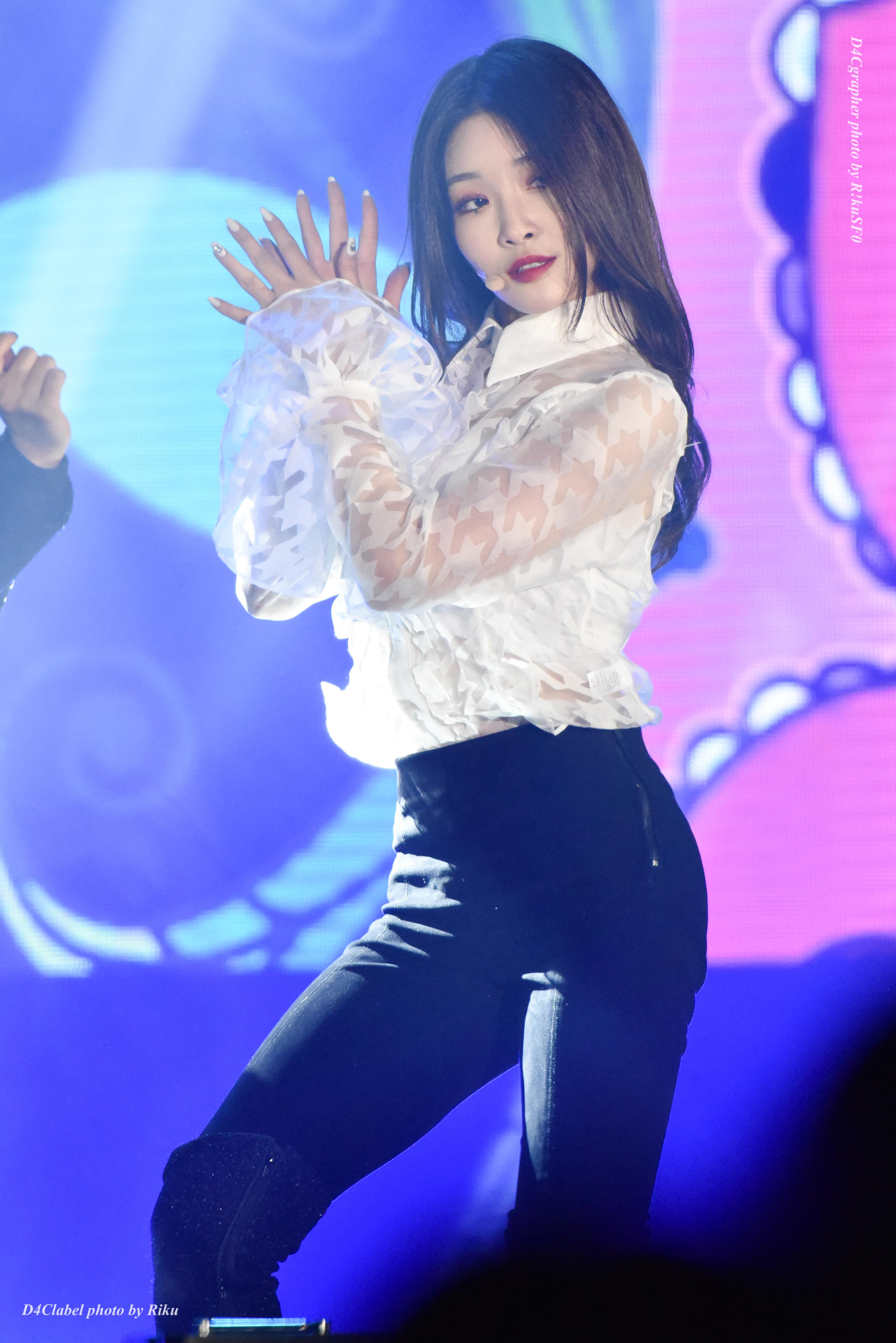
- Chungha performing in 2018
- Studio albums: 2
- EPs: 5
- Singles: 17
- Music videos: 44
- Single albums: 3
- Promotional singles: 1
- Collaborations: 11
- Soundtrack appearances: 13

The discography of South Korean singer, dancer and choreographer Chung Ha consists of two studio albums, five extended plays (EPs), three single albums, seventeen singles, and forty-four music videos. In addition, the singer has collaborative and soundtracks for television series.

== Studio albums ==
List of studio albums, with selected chart positions and sales
| Title | Details | Peak chart positions | | Sales |
| Title | Details | KOR | US World | Sales |
|---|---|---|---|---|
| Querencia | Released: February 15, 2021; Label: MNH Entertainment; Formats: CD, digital download | 6 | 10 | KOR: 31,800 |
| Bare & Rare | Released: July 11, 2022; Label: MNH Entertainment; Formats: CD, digital download | 15 | — | KOR: 11,168 |

== Extended plays ==
List of extended plays, with selected chart positions and sales
| Title | Details | Peak chart position | | Sales |
| Title | Details | KOR | US World | Sales |
|---|---|---|---|---|
| Hands on Me | Released: June 7, 2017; Label: MNH Entertainment; Formats: CD, digital download | 8 | — | KOR: 10,610 |
| Offset | Released: January 17, 2018; Label: MNH Entertainment; Formats: CD, digital download | 3 | 13 | KOR: 13,751 |
| Blooming Blue | Released: July 18, 2018; Label: MNH Entertainment; Formats: CD, digital download | 9 | — | KOR: 9,992 |
| Flourishing | Released: June 24, 2019; Label: MNH Entertainment; Formats: CD, digital download | 6 | 7 | KOR: 22,409 |
| Alivio | Released: February 12, 2025; Label: More Vision; Formats: CD, digital download | 28 | — | KOR: 7,394 |

== Single albums ==
List of single albums, with selected chart positions and sales
| Title | Details | Peak chart positions | Sales |
| Title | Details | KOR | Sales |
|---|---|---|---|
| XII | Released: January 2, 2019; Label: MNH Entertainment; Formats: CD, digital download | 4 | KOR: 10,000 |
| Maxi Single | Released: July 10, 2020; Label: MNH Entertainment; Formats: CD, digital download | 7 | KOR: 12,613 |
| Killing Me | Released: November 29, 2021; Label: MNH Entertainment; Formats: CD, digital download | 17 | KOR: 8,264 |
| Eenie Meenie | Released: March 11, 2024; Label: More Vision; Formats: digital download | — | —N/a |
| Christmas Promises | Released: December 3, 2024; Label: More Vision; Formats: digital download | — | —N/a |

== Singles ==
=== As lead artist ===
List of singles as lead artist, with selected chart positions, showing year released and album name
| Title | Year | Peak chart positions | | | | | Sales (Note: Sales figures for tracks are based on digital downloads, except noted.) | Certifications (Note: In April 2018, Gaon Chart introduced music recording certifications for albums, downloads and streamings.) | Album |
| Title | Year | KOR | KOR Billb. | NZ Hot | SGP | US World | Sales | Certifications | Album |
|---|---|---|---|---|---|---|---|---|---|
| "Week" (월화수목금토일) (Note: "Week" is a pre-debut single.) | 2017 | 86 | — | — | — | — | KOR: 28,492 | —N/a | Hands on Me |
| "Why Don't You Know" (featuring Nucksal) | 2017 | 13 | 7 | — | — | — | KOR: 911,145 | —N/a | Hands on Me |
| "Roller Coaster" | 2018 | 6 | 6 | — | — | 19 | KOR: 2,500,000 | KMCA: Platinum (str.); KMCA: Platinum (dig.) | Offset |
| "Love U" | 2018 | 8 | 8 | — | — | — | —N/a | —N/a | Blooming Blue |
| "Gotta Go" (벌써 12시) | 2019 | 2 | 1 | 23 | 25 | 6 | KOR: 2,500,000; US: 2,000 | KMCA: Platinum (str.); KMCA: Platinum (dig.) | XII |
| "Snapping" | 2019 | 2 | 3 | — | 21 | 9 | —N/a | —N/a | Flourishing |
| "Everybody Has" (솔직히 지친다) | 2020 | 31 | 38 | — | — | — | —N/a | —N/a | Querencia |
| "Stay Tonight" | 2020 | 9 | 12 | — | 30 | 4 | —N/a | —N/a | Querencia |
| "My Friend" (여기 적어줘) (featuring pH-1) | 2020 | — | — | — | — | — | —N/a | —N/a | Non-album single |
| "Be Yourself" | 2020 | 127 | — | — | — | — | —N/a | —N/a | Be Yourself.newwav x Sprite |
| "Play" (featuring Changmo) | 2020 | 14 | 9 | — | — (Note: "Play" did not enter the RIAS Top Streaming Chart, but it peaked at number 11 on the RIAS Top Regional Chart.) | 17 | —N/a | —N/a | Querencia |
| "Dream of You" (with R3hab) | 2020 | — (Note: "Dream of You" did not enter the Gaon Digital chart top 200, but appeared at number 80 on the component Download chart.) | — | — | — | — | —N/a | —N/a | Querencia |
| "X" (걸어온 길에 꽃밭 따윈 없었죠) | 2021 | 100 | — | — | — | — | —N/a | —N/a | Querencia |
| "Bicycle" | 2021 | 38 | 32 | — | — | 11 | —N/a | —N/a | Querencia |
| "Demente" (Spanish version) (with Guaynaa) | 2021 | — (Note: "Demente" did not enter the Gaon Digital chart top 200, but appeared at number 134 on the component Download chart.) | — | — | — | — | —N/a | —N/a | Querencia |
| "Killing Me" | 2021 | 102 | 69 | — | — | 9 | —N/a | —N/a | Killing Me |
| "Sparkling" | 2022 | 44 | 22 | — | — | — | —N/a | —N/a | Bare & Rare |
| "Eenie Meenie" (featuring Hongjoong) | 2024 | 104 | — | — | — | 6 | —N/a | —N/a | EENIE MEENIE |
| "Algorithm" (알고리즘) (Note: "[(Algorithm) (Remixes)]" was released on September 23, 2024.) | 2024 | — (Note: "Algorithm" did not enter the Circle Digital Chart, but it peaked at number 19 on the component Circle Download Chart.) | — | — | — | — | —N/a | —N/a | Non-album single |
| "Sleigh" | 2024 | — (Note: "Sleigh" did not enter the Circle Digital Chart, but it peaked at number 40 on the component Circle Download Chart.) | — | — | — | — | —N/a | —N/a | Christmas Promises |
| "There Goes Santa Claus" | 2024 | — (Note: "There Goes Santa Claus" did not enter the Circle Digital Chart, but it peaked at number 69 on the component Circle Download Chart.) | — | — | — | — | —N/a | —N/a | Christmas Promises |
| "Stress" | 2025 | 115 | — | — | — | — | —N/a | —N/a | Alivio |
| "Thanks for the Memories" | 2025 | — (Note: "Thanks for the Memories" did not enter the Circle Digital Chart, but it peaked at number 35 on the component Circle Download Chart.) | — | — | — | — | —N/a | —N/a | Alivio |
| "México" | 2026 | — (Note: "México" did not enter the Circle Digital Chart, but it peaked at number 16 on the component Circle Download Chart.) | — | — | — | — | —N/a | —N/a | Non-album single |
"—" denotes releases that did not chart or were not released in that region.

=== As featured artist ===
List of singles as featured artist, with selected chart positions, showing year released and album name
| Title | Year | Peak chart position | | Sales | Album |
| Title | Year | KOR | KOR Hot | Sales | Album |
|---|---|---|---|---|---|
| "There Is No Time" (시간이 없어) (DIA's Ki Hui-hyeon featuring Chungha) | 2017 | — | — | —N/a | YOLO |
| "With You" (Samuel featuring Chungha) | 2017 | — | — | —N/a | Sixteen |
| "Gather at the Lobby" (로비로 모여) (Hanhae featuring Dynamic Duo, Chungha and Muzie) | 2017 | 25 | — | KOR: 99,148 | Show Me the Money 6 Episode 2 |
| "LaLaLa" (Babylon featuring Chungha) | 2017 | — | — | —N/a | La Vida Loca |
| "My Paradise" (Groovy Room featuring Chungha, Vinxen) | 2018 | 36 | 46 | —N/a | Non-album single |
| "Live" (Ravi featuring Chungha) | 2019 | — (Note: "Live" did not enter the Gaon Digital chart top 200, but appeared at number 99 on the component Download chart.) | — | —N/a | R.ook Book |
| "Remedy" (Changmo featuring Chungha) | 2019 | 136 | 98 | —N/a | Boyhood |
| "Lie" (Changmin featuring Chungha) | 2020 | — | — | —N/a | Chocolate |
| "Why Don't We" (Rain featuring Chungha) | 2021 | 106 | — | —N/a | Pieces by Rain |
| "White Lily" (리얼러브) (Shin Hae-gyeong featuring Chungha) | 2022 | — | — | —N/a | Non-album single |
| "Flower" (그댄 꽃) (Shin Yong-jae featuring Chungha) | 2022 | — (Note: "Flower" did not enter the Gaon Digital chart top 200, but appeared at number 138 on the component Download chart.) | — | —N/a | The Four Seasons |
| "Color Me" (Junny featuring Chungha) | 2022 | — | — | —N/a | blanc |
| "Goodbye, Stay Well" (마지막 인사) (Lee Chan-hyuk featuring Chungha) | 2022 | — (Note: "Goodbye, Stay Well" did not enter the Circle Digital chart top 200, but appeared at number 61 on the component Download chart.) | — | —N/a | Error |
| "Turtle" (Blasé featuring Chungha) | 2024 | — (Note: "Turtle" did not enter the Circle Digital chart top 200, but appeared at number 156 on the component Download chart.) | — | —N/a | Debugging |
| "hair down (remix)" (thủy featuring Chungha) | 2024 | — (Note: "hair down (remix)" did not enter the Circle Digital chart top 200, but appeared at number 151 on the component Download chart.) | — | —N/a | Non-album single |
| "Come Back to Me" (Kang Daniel featuring Chungha) | 2024 | — (Note: "Come Back to Me" did not enter the Circle Digital chart top 200, but appeared at number 15 on the component Download chart.) | — | —N/a | Act |
| "Gimme A Minute" (Jay Park featuring Chungha) | 2024 | — (Note: "Gimme A Minute" did not enter the Circle Digital chart top 200, but appeared at number 20 on the component Download chart.) | — | —N/a | THE ONE YOU WANTED |
"—" denotes releases that did not chart or were not released in that region.

== Collaborations ==
List of collaborations, with selected chart positions, showing year released and album name
| Title | Year | Peak chart position | | Sales | Album |
| Title | Year | KOR | KOR Hot | Sales | Album |
|---|---|---|---|---|---|
| "Flower, Wind and You" (꽃, 바람 그리고 너) (with Ki Hui-hyeon, Jeon Somi and Choi Yoo-jung) | 2016 | 42 | — | KOR: 38,862 | Non-album single |
| "Rainy Day" (with Wheesung and Taeil) | 2018 | — (Note: "Rainy Day" did not enter the Gaon Digital chart top 200, but appeared at number 48 on the component Download chart.) | — | —N/a | The Call Project, No. 2 |
| "Wow Thing" (with Jeon So-yeon, Seulgi and SinB) | 2018 | 35 | 43 | —N/a | SM Station X 0 |
| "Whatcha Doin'" (지금 어디야?) (with Yesung) | 2018 | — | — | —N/a | SM Station Season 3 |
| "Run" (with Grizzly) | 2019 | 100 | — | —N/a | Flourishing |
| "Fast" (with Mommy Son) | 2019 | 127 | — | —N/a | JTBC Seoul Marathon |
| "These Nights" (with 88Rising's Rich Brian) | 2019 | — | — | —N/a | Head in the Clouds II |
| "Loveship" (with Paul Kim) | 2020 | 12 | 22 | —N/a | Non-album singles |
| "Bad Boy" (with Christopher) | 2020 | 31 | — | —N/a | Non-album singles |
| "My Lips Like Warm Coffee" (내 입술 따뜻한 커피처럼) (with Colde) | 2021 | 61 | 42 | —N/a | Non-album singles |
| "Bad Girl" (with Lachica) | 2021 | — (Note: "Bad Girl" did not enter the Gaon Digital chart top 200, but appeared at number 46 on the component Download chart.) | — | —N/a | Street Woman Fighter Special |
| "When I Get Old" (with Christopher) | 2022 | 85 | — | —N/a | Non-album singles |
| "Move Remove" (with Lee Eun-mi) | 2024 | — (Note: "Move Remove" did not enter the Circle Digital chart top 200, but appeared at number 70 on the component Download chart.) | — | —N/a | Non-album singles |
| "Find Love" (with Etham) | 2025 | 139 | — | —N/a | Non-album singles |
"—" denotes releases that did not chart or were not released in that region.

== Soundtrack appearances ==
List of soundtrack appearances, with selected chart positions, showing year released and album name
| Title | Year | Peak chart position | | Album |
| Title | Year | KOR | KOR Hot | Album |
|---|---|---|---|---|
| "Snow in This Year" (with Heo Jung-eun and HALO's Ooon) | 2016 | — | — | My Fair Lady OST Part 6 |
| "Pit-a-Pat" (두근두근) | 2017 | — | — | Strong Girl Bong-soon OST Part 4 |
| "How About You" | 2018 | — | — | Luv Pub OST Part 3 |
| "Remember" (with The Call artists) | 2018 | — | — | The Call OST |
| "It's You" (너였나 봐) | 2018 | — | — | Where Stars Land OST Part 1 |
| "Sunshine" | 2018 | — | — | Aura Kingdom S OST |
| "At the End" (그 끝에 그대) | 2019 | 18 | — | Hotel del Luna OST Part 6 |
| "My Love" (나의 그대) | 2020 | 114 | — | Dr. Romantic 2 OST Part 8 |
| "You're in My Soul" | 2020 | — | — | Record of Youth OST Part 2 |
| "Someday" | 2021 | — (Note: "Someday" did not enter the Gaon Digital chart top 200, but appeared at number 56 on the component Download chart.) | — | One the Woman OST Part 3 |
| "It's Only Mine" (나만의 것) | 2022 | — (Note: "It's Only Mine" did not enter the Gaon Digital chart top 200, but appeared at number 101 on the component Download chart.) | — | Seoul Check-in OST Part 4 |
| "A Star in the Dawn" (새벽에 핀 별 하나) | 2022 | — (Note: "A Star in the Dawn" did not enter the Gaon Digital chart top 200, but appeared at number 48 on the component Download chart.) | — | Bloody Heart OST Part 4 |
| "Everything Goes On - KR Remix" | 2022 | — | — | 2022 Star Guardian Theme Song |
"—" denotes releases that did not chart or were not released in that region.

== Other charted songs ==
List of other charted songs, with selected chart positions, showing year released and album name
| Title | Year | Peak chart position | Album |
| Title | Year | KOR | Album |
|---|---|---|---|
| "Chica" | 2019 | 91 | Flourishing |
| "Young In Love" (우리가 즐거워) | 2019 | — (Note: "Young In Love" did not enter the Gaon Digital Chart, but it peaked at number 159 on the component Gaon Download Chart.) | Flourishing |
| "Call It Love" | 2019 | — (Note: "Call It Love" did not enter the Gaon Digital Chart, but it peaked at number 200 on the component Gaon Download Chart.) | Flourishing |
| "Flourishing" | 2019 | — (Note: "Flourishing" did not enter the Gaon Digital Chart, but it peaked at number 180 on the component Gaon Download Chart.) | Flourishing |
| "Masquerade" | 2021 | — (Note: "Masquerade" did not enter the Gaon Digital chart top 200, but appeared at number 62 on the component Download chart.) | Querencia |
| "Flying on Faith" | 2021 | — (Note: "Flying on Faith" did not enter the Gaon Digital chart top 200, but appeared at number 63 on the component Download chart.) | Querencia |
| "Chill" | 2021 | — (Note: "Chill" did not enter the Gaon Digital chart top 200, but appeared at number 81 on the component Download chart.) | Querencia |
| "Luce Sicut Stellae" | 2021 | — (Note: "Luce Sicut Stellae" did not enter the Gaon Digital chart top 200, but appeared at number 100 on the component Download chart.) | Querencia |
| "Bother Me" | 2021 | — (Note: "Bother Me" did not enter the Gaon Digital chart top 200, but appeared at number 102 on the component Download chart.) | Querencia |
| "Lemon" (featuring Colde) | 2021 | — (Note: "Lemon" did not enter the Gaon Digital chart top 200, but appeared at number 111 on the component Download chart.) | Querencia |
| "Byulharang (160504 + 170607)" | 2021 | — (Note: "Byulharang (160504 + 170607)" did not enter the Gaon Digital chart top 200, but appeared at number 127 on the component Download chart.) | Querencia |
| "Comes N Goes" | 2021 | — (Note: "Comes N Goes" did not enter the Gaon Digital chart top 200, but appeared at number 135 on the component Download chart.) | Querencia |
| "All Night Long" | 2021 | — (Note: "All Night Long" did not enter the Gaon Digital chart top 200, but appeared at number 137 on the component Download chart.) | Querencia |
| "Crazy Like You" (featuring Bibi) | 2022 | — (Note: "Crazy Like You" did not enter the Gaon Digital chart top 200, but appeared at number 76 on the component Download chart.) | Bare & Rare |
| "California Dream" | 2022 | — (Note: "California Dream" did not enter the Gaon Digital chart top 200, but appeared at number 78 on the component Download chart.) | Bare & Rare |
| "Love Me Out Loud" | 2022 | — (Note: "Love Me Out Loud" did not enter the Gaon Digital chart top 200, but appeared at number 89 on the component Download chart.) | Bare & Rare |
| "Louder" | 2022 | — (Note: "Louder" did not enter the Gaon Digital chart top 200, but appeared at number 92 on the component Download chart.) | Bare & Rare |
| "XXXX" | 2022 | — (Note: "XXXX" did not enter the Gaon Digital chart top 200, but appeared at number 95 on the component Download chart.) | Bare & Rare |
| "Good Night My Princess" | 2022 | — (Note: "Good Night My Princess" did not enter the Gaon Digital chart top 200, but appeared at number 101 on the component Download chart.) | Bare & Rare |
| "Nuh-Uh" | 2022 | — (Note: "Nuh-Uh" did not enter the Gaon Digital chart top 200, but appeared at number 108 on the component Download chart.) | Bare & Rare |
| "I'm Ready" | 2024 | — (Note: "I'm Ready" did not enter the Circle Digital Chart, but it peaked at number 26 on the component Circle Download Chart.) | Non-album song (Note: "I'm Ready" was released as the B-side to digital single "Eenie Meenie" (2024).) |

== Other appearances ==
| Title | Year | Album |
|---|---|---|
| "Thank You For" (Note: Military campaign song) | 2017 | Non-album singles |
| "Orinalda" (오리날다) (Note: College Scholastic Ability Test campaign song) (with Cha Kil-yong) | 2018 | Non-album singles |

=== Music video appearances ===
| Year | Title | Artist | Ref. |
|---|---|---|---|
| 2017 | "Pretty Pretty" (예쁨월화수목금토일) | Pentagon | |

== Music videos ==
| Music video | Year | Album | Director(s) | Ref. |
|---|---|---|---|---|
| "Week" (월화수목금토일) | 2017 | Hands on Me | VISHOP (Vikings League) | |
| "Week" (Performance Ver.) (월화수목금토일) | 2017 | Hands on Me | VISHOP (Vikings League) | |
| "Why Don't You Know" | 2017 | Hands on Me | VISHOP (Vikings League) | |
| "Why Don't You Know" (Performance Ver.) | 2017 | Hands on Me | VISHOP (Vikings League) | |
| "LaLaLa" (Babylon featuring Chungha) | 2017 | La Vida Loca | Unknown | |
| "LaLaLa (Special Clip)" (Babylon featuring Chungha) | 2017 | La Vida Loca | Unknown | |
| "Thank You For" | 2017 | Non-album single | Unknown | |
| "Roller Coaster" | 2018 | Offset | VISHOP (Vikings League) | |
| "Roller Coaster (Performance Ver.)" | 2018 | Offset | VISHOP (Vikings League) | |
| "How About You" | 2018 | Luv Pub OST | Unknown | |
| "Love U" | 2018 | Blooming Blue | VISHOP (Vikings League) | |
| "Love U" (Performance Ver.) | 2018 | Blooming Blue | VISHOP (Vikings League) | |
| "Wow Thing" (with Jeon So-yeon, Seulgi and SinB) | 2018 | SM Station X 0 | Doori Kwak (GDW) | |
| "It's You'" | 2018 | Where Stars Land OST | Unknown | |
| "Orinalda" (오리날다) (with Cha Kil-yong) | 2018 | Non-album single | Unknown | |
| "Whatcha Doin'" (지금 어디야?) (with Yesung) | 2018 | Non-album single | SUNNYVISUAL | |
| "Gotta Go" (벌써 12시) | 2019 | XII | Wooje Kim (ETUI Collective) | |
| "Snapping" | 2019 | Flourishing | Rima Yoon, Dongju Jang (Rigend Film) | |
| "Snapping" (Performance Ver.) | 2019 | Flourishing | Rima Yoon, Dongju Jang (Rigend Film) | |
| "Fast" | 2019 | JTBC Seoul Marathon | Unknown | |
| "These Nights" (with 88Rising's Rich Brian) | 2019 | Head in the Clouds II | Michael LaBurt | |
| "Remedy" (Changmo featuring Chungha) | 2019 | Boyhood | Beomjin, Kim Ji-woo (VM Project Architecture) | |
| "Loveship" (with Paul Kim) | 2020 | Non-album single | a HOBIN film | |
| "Everybody Has" (솔직히 지친다) | 2020 | New.wav; Querencia | VISHOP (Vikings League) | |
| "Stay Tonight" | 2020 | Querencia | Rima Yoon, Dongju Jang (Rigend Film) | |
| "My Friend" (Featuring ph-1) | 2020 | M2 Song Farm Project | Unknown | —N/a |
| "Be Yourself" | 2020 | Be Yourself.newwav x Sprite | INSP (KOINRUSH) | |
| "Play" (featuring Changmo) | 2020 | Querencia | Yoo Jaehyeong (Rigend Film) | |
| "Play" (Performance Ver.) (featuring Changmo) | 2020 | Querencia | Yoo Jaehyeong (Rigend Film) | |
| "Bad Boy" (with Christopher) | 2020 | Non-album single | Unknown | |
| "Dream of You" (Performance Ver.) (with R3hab) | 2020 | Querencia | NOVVKIM | |
| "X" (걸어온 길에 꽃밭 따윈 없었죠) | 2021 | Querencia | Dee Shin (FantazyLab) | |
| "Bicycle" | 2021 | Querencia | Yoo Jaehyeong (Rigend Film) | |
| "Why Don't We" (Performance Ver.) (Rain featuring Chungha) | 2021 | Pieces by Rain | Lee Gi-baek (Tigercave Studio) | |
| "Why Don't We" (Rain featuring Chungha) | 2021 | Pieces by Rain | Lee Gi-baek (Tigercave Studio) | |
| "Demente (Spanish Ver.)" ft. Guaynaa | 2021 | Querencia | VISHOP (Vikings League) | |
| "My Lips Like Warm Coffee" (내 입술 따뜻한 커피처럼) (with Colde) | 2021 | Non-album single | Unknown | |
| "Killing Me" | 2021 | Killing Me | Kwon Yong-soo | |
| "Killing Me" (Performance Ver.) | 2021 | Killing Me | Kwon Yong-soo | |
| "It's Only Mine" (나만의 것) | 2022 | Seoul Check-in OST | Unknown | |
| "A Star in the Dawn" (새벽에 핀 별 하나) | 2022 | Bloody Heart OST | Unknown | |
| "Sparkling" | 2022 | Bare & Rare | Kwon Yong-soo | |
| "Everything Goes On - KR Remix" | 2022 | 2022 Star Guardian Theme Song | Unknown | |
| "Eenie Meenie" ft. Hongjoong of Ateez | 2024 | Eenie Meenie | Bang Jae-yeob | |
| "I'm Ready" ( Performance Video) | 2024 | Eenie Meenie | Novvkim | |
| "Algorithm" | 2024 | Non-album single | 88 Gymnastic Heroes | |
| "Sleigh" | 2024 | Christmas Promises | Novvkim | |
| "There Goes Santa Claus" | 2024 | Christmas Promises | Novvkim | |
| "Stress" | 2025 | Alivio | Park Hyeongjun | |
| "It's that Time of Year" | 2025 | Non-album single | Unknown | |

== Songwriting credits ==
All song credits are adapted from the Korea Music Copyright Association's database, unless otherwise noted.

List of songs, showing year released, and name of the album
| Year | Album | Artist | Song | Lyrics | | Music | |
| Year | Album | Artist | Song | Credited | With | Credited | With |
|---|---|---|---|---|---|---|---|
| 2017 | Hands on Me | Herself | "Hands on Me" | Yes | VINCENZO, Fuxxy, Any Masingga | No | —N/a |
| 2018 | Offset | Herself | "Offset" | Yes | VINCENZO, Fuxxy, Any Masingga | No | —N/a |
| 2019 | Flourishing | Herself | "Flourishing" | Yes | Anna Timgren, VINCENZO | Yes | Anna Timgren, VINCENZO |
| 2019 | Head in the Clouds II | Herself | "These Nights" | Yes | Slanger, Montana Wayne Best, McCulloch Reid Sutphin, Jordan Orvosh, Rich Brian | No | —N/a |
| 2021 | Querencia | Herself | "Bicycle" | Yes | VINCENZO | No | —N/a |
| 2021 | Querencia | Herself | "Byulharang (160504 + 170607)" | Yes | VINCENZO, Fuxxy, Any Masingga | Yes | VINCENZO, Fuxxy, Any Masingga |
| 2021 | Killing Me | Herself | "Killing Me" | Yes | Jo Yoon-kyung | No | —N/a |
| 2022 | Bare & Rare | Herself | "XXXX" | Yes | Sophia Pae, Fuxxy, Any Masingga, Ximon, Winnie | No | —N/a |
| 2022 | Bare & Rare | Herself | "Sparkling" | Yes | BXN | No | —N/a |
| 2022 | Bare & Rare | Herself | "Louder" | Yes | Alma Goodman, Klara Elias, Tushar Apte | No | —N/a |
| 2022 | Bare & Rare | Herself | "Crazy Like You" (featuring Bibi) | Yes | Bibi, Luvssong, Ryan Jhun, Kloe, Sam Preston, Rick Parkouse, George Tizzard | No | —N/a |
| 2022 | Bare & Rare | Herself | "California Dream" | Yes | —N/a | No | —N/a |
| 2022 | Bare & Rare | Herself | "Good Night My Princess" | Yes | Jo Yoon-kyung | No | —N/a |
| 2022 | Bare & Rare | Herself | "Love Me Out Loud" | Yes | Jo Yoon-kyung | No | —N/a |
| 2022 | Bare & Rare | Herself | "Nuh-Uh" | Yes | Lee Seu-ran, Fuxxy, Any Masingga | No | —N/a |
| 2022 | 2022 Star Guardian Theme Song | Herself | "Everything Goes On - KR Remix" | Yes | Jo Yoon-kyung | No | —N/a |
| 2024 | EENIE MEENIE | Herself | "EENIE MEENIE (featuring Hongjoong of Ateez)" | Yes | Hongjoong (Ateez), Anne-Marie Rose Nicholson, Conor Blake Manning, Sara Rachel Boe, Samuel Brennan, Tom Hollings | No | —N/a |
| 2024 | EENIE MEENIE | Herself | "I’m Ready" | Yes | MaryJane, Nicholas James Gale, Joe Anthony Holmes Harvey, Jack Matthew Holmes Harvey | No | —N/a |
| 2025 | Alivio | Herself | "Even Steven (Happy Ending)" | Yes | Joe Harvey, Jack Matthew Holmes Harvey, Isabella Mae Adderley | No | —N/a |
| 2025 | Alivio | Herself | "Still a Rose" | Yes | Bong Eun-young, Kim In-hyung, Ji Yu-ri, Alina Smith (LYRE) | No | —N/a |
| 2025 | Alivio | Herself | "Stress" | Yes | Lee Hyung-seok, Ondine, Taeo, Fast Christian Anders, Jonna Jacqueline Andersdotter Hall | No | —N/a |
| 2025 | Alivio | Herself | "Beat of My Heart" | Yes | Jantine Annika Heij, Jake Brian Tench | No | —N/a |
| 2026 | I.O.I: Loop | I.O.I | "그때 우리 지금" | Yes | —N/a | No | —N/a |

== See also ==
- I.O.I discography
- List of songs recorded by Chungha
