= List of songs recorded by Chung Ha =

This is a complete list of songs by the South Korean singer Chung Ha.

Key
†	Indicates single/OST release

== A ==
Song	Writer	Album	Year	Ref
"At the End" (그 끝에 그대) †	Ji Hoon; Park Se-jun	Hotel Del Luna OST	2019	
"All Night Long"	Baek Ye-rin	Querencia	2021	
"A Star in the Dawn" (새벽에 핀 별 하나) †	유송연; Jay Lee	Bloody Heart OST	2022	

== B ==
Song	Writer	Album	Year	Ref
"Bad Boy"	Vincenzo; Any Masingga; Fuxxy; Anna Timgren	Offset	2018	
"BB"	—	Blooming Blue	2018	
"Be Yourself" †	VINCENZO; Fuxxy; Any Masingga	Be Yourself.newwav x Sprite	2020	
"Bicycle" †	VINCENZO; Chungha	Querencia	2021	
"Bother Me" (짜증 나게 만들)	Sumin	Querencia	2021	
"Byulharang (160504 + 170607)" (별하랑)	Chungha; VINCENZO; Fuxxy; Any Masingga	Querencia	2021	
"Bad Girl" (with LACHICA) †	Czaer; EJAE	Street Woman Fighter Special	2021	

== C ==
Song	Writer	Album	Year	Ref
"Cosmic Dust"	Black Band	Hands on Me	2017	
"Cherry Kisses"	Vincenzo; Coach & Sendo; Anne Judith Wik; Nermin Harambasic; Ronny Vidar Svendsen	Blooming Blue	2018	
"Chica"	Vincenzo; Any Masingga; Fuxxy; Anna Timgren	Flourishing	2019	
"Call It Love"	Shim Eunji	Flourishing	2019	
"Chill" (Chill해)	earattack Ra.L	Querencia	2021	
"Comes and Goes"	VINCENZO; Masingga; Fuxxy; Timgren	Querencia	2021	
"Color Me" (Junny feat. Chungha) †	Junny 밍지션	—	2022	
"California Dream"	Chungha	Bare & Rare	2022	
"Crazy Like You" (feat. Bibi)	Chungha; Bibi; Luvssong; Ryan Jhun; Kloe; Sam Preston; Rick Parkouse; George Tizzard	Bare & Rare	2022	

== D ==
Song	Writer	Album	Year	Ref
"Do It"	Vincenzo; Any Masingga; Fuxxy; Emelie Sederholm	Offset	2018	
"Drive"	Vincenzo; Fuxxy; Any Masingga	Blooming Blue	2018	
"Dream of You" (with R3hab) †	Peter Hanna; Rebecca King	Querencia	2020	
"Demente" (feat. Guaynaa)	Lao Ra; Guaynaa; Vincenzo	Querencia	2021	
"Demente" (Spanish version) (with Guaynaa) †	Lao Ra; Guaynaa	Querencia	2021	

== E ==
Song	Writer	Album	Year	Ref
"Everybody Has" (솔직히 지친다) †	Armadillo	New.wav; Querencia	2020	
"Everything Goes On - KR Remix" †	Chungha; Jo Yoon-kyung	2022 Star Guardian Theme Song	2022	

== F ==
Song	Writer	Album	Year	Ref
"Flower, Wind and You" (꽃, 바람 그리고 너) (with DIA's Ki Hui-hyeon, Weki Meki's Choi Yoo-jung, and Jeon So-mi) †	똘아이박; Peterpan; Ki Hui-hyeon	—	2016	
"From Now On"	Baek Ye-rin	Blooming Blue	2018	
"Flourishing"	Chungha; Anna Timgren; Vincenzo	Flourishing	2019	
"Fast" (달려) (with Mommy Son) †	키겐; Mommy Son	JTBC Seoul Marathon theme song	2019	
"Flying on Faith"	Mich Hansen; Daniel Mirza; Daniel Davidsen; Wayne Hector; Lucas Secon	Querencia	2021	
"Flower" (Shin Yong-jae feat. Chungha)	Ellie Suh (153/Joombas)	The Four Seasons	2022	

== G ==
Song	Writer	Album	Year	Ref
"Gather at the Lobby" (로비로 모여) (Hanhae feat. Dynamic Duo, Chungha and Muzie) †	Unknown	Show Me the Money 6 Episode 2	2017	
"Gotta Go" †	Black Eyed Pilseung; Jeon Goon	XII	2019	
"Good Night My Princess"	Chungha; Jo Yoon-kyung	Bare & Rare	2022	

== H ==
Song	Writer	Album	Year	Ref
"Hands on Me"	Chungha; VINCENZO; Fuxxy; Any Masingga	Hands on Me	2017	
"How About You" †	로코	Luv Pub (연애포차) OST	2018	

== I ==
Song	Writer	Album	Year	Ref
"It's You" (너였나 봐) †	Nam Hye-seung; Park Jin-ho	Where Stars Land OST	2018	
"It's Only Mine" (나만의 것) †	김순곤	Seoul Check-in OST	2022	

== K ==
Song	Writer	Album	Year	Ref
"Killing Me" †	Chungha 조윤경	Killing Me	2021	

== L ==
Song	Writer	Album	Year	Ref
"LaLaLa" (Babylon feat. Chungha) †	Babylon; Kriz	—	2017	
"Love U" †	Oreo	Blooming Blue	2018	
"Live" (Ravi feat. Chungha) †	Ravi	R.OOK BOOK	2019	
"Loveship" (with Paul Kim) †	Paul Kim	—	2020	
"Lie" (Changmin feat. Chungha)	Seo Ji-eum	Chocolate	2020	
"Luce Sicut Stellae"	Lee Seu-ran	Querencia	2021	
"Lemon" (feat. Colde)	Colde	Querencia	2021	
"Louder"	Chungha; Alma Goodman; Klara Elias; Tushar Apte	Bare & Rare	2022	
"Love Me Out Loud"	Chungha; Jo Yoon-kyung	Bare & Rare	2022	

== M ==
Song	Writer	Album	Year	Ref
"Make a Wish"	Dailydose; Anna Timgren	Hands on Me	2017	
"My Paradise" (Groovy Room feat. Chungha, Vinxen) †	Seo Ji-eum; Vinxen	My Paradise	2018	
"My Love" †	Ji Hoon; Jeon Chang-yeop	Dr. Romantic 2 OST	2020	
"My Friend" (여기 적어줘) (feat. pH-1) †	Zion. T pH-1; Taeo	M2 Song Farm Project	2020	
"Masquerade"	Jinri (Full8loom)	Querencia	2021	
"My Lips like Warm Coffee" (내 입술 따뜻한 커피처럼) (with Colde)	Won Tae-yeon; Heo In-chang	Non-album single	2021	

== N ==
Song	Writer	Album	Year	Ref
"Nuh-Uh"	Chungha; Lee Seu-ran; Fuxxy; Masingga	Bare & Rare	2022	

== O ==
Song	Writer	Album	Year	Ref
"Offset"	Chungha; Vincenzo; Any Masingga; Fuxxy	Offset	2018	

== P ==
Song	Writer	Album	Year	Ref
"Pit-a-Pat" (두근두근) †	UK	Strong Girl Bong-soon (힘쎈여자 도봉순) OST	2017	
"Play" (feat. Changmo) †	VINCENZO; Fuxxy; Any Masingga; Anna Timgren; Changmo	Maxi Single; Querencia	2020	

== Q ==
Song	Writer	Album	Year	Ref
"Querencia (Epilogue)"	VINCENZO	Querencia	2021	

== R ==
Song	Writer	Album	Year	Ref
"Roller Coaster" †	Black Eyed Pilseung; Jeon Goon	Offset	2018	
"Remind of You" (너의 온도)	Team Columbus	Offset	2018	
"Rainy Day" (Wheesung feat. Chungha and Taeil)	Unknown	In Space	2018	
"Remember" (with The Call artists) †	Kim Eana; BewhY	The Call (더 콜) OST	2018	
"RUN" (with Grizzly) †	Grizzly; Cracker	—	2019	
"Remedy" (Changmo feat. Chungha) †	Changmo	Boyhood	2019	

== S ==
Song	Writer	Album	Year	Ref
"Snow in This Year" (with Heo Jung-eun and HALO's Ooon) †	Unknown	My Fair Lady (오 마이 금비) OST	2016	
"Sunshine" †	Unknown	AURA KINGDOM S OST	2018	
"Snapping" †	Park Woo-sang; Sola	Flourishing	2019	
"Stay Tonight" (스테이 투나잇) †	VINCENZO; Any Masingga; Fuxxy; Anna Timgren	Maxi Single; Querencia	2020	
"Side A (Noble)"	VINCENZO	Querencia	2021	
"Someday" †	CHIMMI	One the Woman OST	2021	
"Sparkling" †	BXN; Chungha	Bare & Rare	2022	

== T ==
Song	Writer	Album	Year	Ref
"There Is No Time" (Ki Hui-hyeon feat. Chungha)	Ki Hui-hyeon; Slapstick	YOLO	2017	
"Thank You For"	Unknown	—	2017	
"These Nights" (with Rich Brian) †	Chungha; Slanger; Montana Wayne Best; McCulloch Reid Sutphin; Jordan Orvosh; Rich Brian	Head in the Clouds II	2019	

== W ==
Song	Writer	Album	Year	Ref
"Week" †	CRACKER; Grizzly	Hands on Me	2017	
"Why Don't You Know" (feat. Nucksal) †	Oreo; Nucksal	Hands on Me	2017	
"With U" (Samuel feat. Chungha)	Maboos	Sixteen	2017	
"Wow Thing" (with Jeon So-yeon, Seulgi and SinB) †	Karen Poole; Anne Judith Stokke Wik; Sonny J Mason; Jeon So-yeon; Jo Yun-gyeong	SM Station X 0	2018	
"Whatcha Doin'" (with Yesung) †	Yesung 민연재	—	2018	
"Why Don't We" (Rain feat. Chungha) †	Sik-K	Pieces by Rain	2021	
"White Lily" (리얼러브) (Shin Hae-gyeong feat. Chungha)	Shin Hae-gyeong	—	2022	

== X ==
Song	Writer	Album	Year	Ref
"X" (걸어온 길에 꽃밭 따윈 없었죠) †	Cliff Lin; The Black Skirts	Querencia	2020	
"XXXX"	Chungha; Sophia Pae; Fuxxy; Any Masingga; Ximon; Winnie	Bare & Rare	2022	

== Y ==
Song	Writer	Album	Year	Ref
"Young in Love" (우리가 즐거워)	Baek Ye-rin	Flourishing	2019	
"You're In My Soul"†	Nam Hye-seung; Surf Green; Jello Ann	Record of Youth OST	2020	

== Other songs ==
Song	Writer	Album	Year	Ref
"오리날다" (with Cha Kil-yong)	Unknown	—	2018	
