= Dream of You =

Dream of You may refer to:

== Albums ==
- Dream of You (Sharon Corr album), 2010
- Dream of You (Helen Merrill album), 1957

== Songs ==
- "Dream of You" (1934 song), a 1934 jazz standard first recorded by Jimmie Lunceford
- "Dream of You" (Camila Cabello song), from the album Romance (2019)
- "Dream of You" (Chungha and R3hab song), a 2020 song by Chungha and R3hab
- "Dream of You" (Schiller song)", 2001
- "Dreams of You" (Ralph McTell song)", 1975

== Other uses in music ==
- Dream of You Tour, a 2011 tour by Sharon Corr
