= 10th Gaon Chart Music Awards =

2021 South Korean award ceremony

10th Gaon Chart Music Chart Awards
- Date: January 13, 2021
- Hosted by: Leeteuk; Lia; Jaejae; Joo Young-hoon
- Most awards: BTS (6)
- Most nominations: BTS (10)

The 10th Gaon Chart Music Awards ceremony was held on January 13, 2021, via virtual livestream from studio without any performance and on-site audience due to COVID-19 pandemic in South Korea. BTS was the most awarded act with 6 awards, followed by Blackpink with 4 and IU with 3.

== Winners and nominees ==
- Winners are listed first, highlighted in **boldface**, and indicated with a double-dagger (‡).
  - Nominees

=== Main awards ===
Artist of the Year – Digital Music
December 2019	January 2020
**Red Velvet – "Psycho"** ‡; Davichi – "Dear."; Baek Ye-rin – "Square (2017)"; Baek Ji-young – "No Love, No Heartbreak"; Jung Seung-hwan – "My Christmas Wish"	**Zico – "Any Song"** ‡; BTS – "Black Swan"; Younha – "Dark Cloud"; Taeyeon – "Dear Me"; Paul Kim and Chungha – "Loveship"
February 2020	March 2020
**BTS – "On"** ‡; BTS – "00:00 (Zero O'Clock)"; BTS – "Friends"; BTS – "Filter"; Iz*One – "Fiesta"	**MC the Max – "Bloom"** ‡; Itzy – "Wannabe"; Winner – "Hold"; Suho – "Let's Love"; Ovan – "I Need You"
April 2020	May 2020
**Oh My Girl – "Nonstop"** ‡; Oh My Girl – "Dolphin"; Apink – "Dumhdurum"; Chungha – "Stay Tonight"; Paul Kim – "But I'll Miss You"	**IU – "Eight" (featuring Suga)** ‡; Baekhyun – "Candy"; Bolbbalgan4 – "Leo" (featuring Baekhyun); Bolbbalgan4 – "Hug"; Taeyeon – "Happy"
June 2020	July 2020
**Blackpink – "How You Like That"** ‡; Twice – "More & More"; Sunmi – "Pporappippam"; Sik-K, pH-1, Jay Park and Gaon – "Gang - Official Remix"; Hwasa – "María"	**Zico – "Summer Hate" (featuring Rain)** ‡; Lee Hi – "Holo"; Red Velvet – Irene & Seulgi – "Monster"; Jessi – "Nunu Nana"; Chungha – "Play"
August 2020	September 2020
**BTS – "Dynamite"** ‡; (G)I-dle – "Dumdi Dumdi"; Blackpink – "Ice Cream" (with Selena Gomez); Itzy – "Not Shy"; Park Jin-young – "When We Disco" (with Sunmi)	**Chungha and Christopher – "Bad Boy"** ‡; 10cm – "Tight"; Kim Ho-joong – "In Full Bloom"; Yooa – "Bon Voyage"; Ovan – "Happy Birthday"
October 2020	November 2020
**Blackpink – "Lovesick Girls"** ‡; Jawsh 685, Jason Derulo, and BTS – "Savage Love (Laxed – Siren Beat) (BTS Remix)"; Mamamoo – "Dingga"; Im Chang-jung – "Love Should Not Be Harsh On You"; Jang Beom-june – "Can't Sleep"	**BTS – "Life Goes On"** ‡; KyoungSeo – "Shiny Star"; Lim Young-woong – "Hero"; Lee Seung-gi – "The Ordinary Man"; Jannabi – A Thought On An Autumn Night
Artist of the Year – Physical Album
1st Quarter (December 2019 – February 2020)	2nd Quarter (March – May 2020)
**BTS – Map of the Soul: 7** ‡; Ateez – Treasure Epilogue: Action to Answer; Iz*One – Bloom*Iz; Stray Kids – Clé: Levanter; Red Velvet – The ReVe Festival: Finale	**Baekhyun – Delight** ‡; Got7 – Dye; NCT 127 – NCT #127: Neo Zone; NCT 127 – NCT #127 Neo Zone: The Final Round; NCT Dream – Reload
3rd Quarter (June – August 2020)	4th Quarter (September – November 2020)
**Seventeen – Heng:garæ** ‡; Ateez – Zero: Fever Part.1; Iz*One – Oneric Diary; Twice – More & More; Exo-SC – 1 Billion Views	**BTS – Be** ‡; Blackpink – The Album; NCT – NCT Resonance Pt. 1; NCT – NCT Resonance Pt. 2; Seventeen – Semicolon
New Artist of the Year
Digital Music	Physical Album
**Aespa – "Black Mamba"** ‡; STAYC – "So Bad"; Bang Ye-dam – "Wayo"; Gyeong Seo Yeji – "Why Has Your Love Changed?"; Gunho – "Actually I Miss You"	**Enhypen – Border: Day One** ‡; Cravity – Season 2. Hideout: The New Day We Step Into; Drippin – Boyager; Treasure – The First Step: Chapter One; WEi – Identity: First Sight

=== Special awards ===
Category	Winner
Lyricist of the Year	IU
Music Steady Seller of the Year	IU – "Blueming"
Retail Album of the Year	BTS – Map of the Soul: 7
World K-Pop Rookie	Ateez; Itzy
Social Hot Star of the Year	Blackpink
Mubeat Global Choice	Blackpink; Lim Young-woong
Hot Performance of the Year	Iz*One; Stray Kids
Top Kit Seller of the Year	NCT
World Hallyu Star Award	NCT
K-pop Contribution of the Year	Lee Soo-man of SM Entertainment
Composer of the Year	Pop Time
Record Production of the Year	Changmo; Ambition Musik
Discovery of the Year	Young Tak
Performer of the Year	Young (musical instrument); Kriz (chorus)
Popular Singer of the Year	Hwang In-wook
Style of the Year	Son Sung-deuk (choreography); Park Min-hee and Kim Bal-ko (stylist)
International Rising Star of the Year	Tones and I
