= Querencia (album) =

2021 studio album by Chung Ha

- Standard physical cover

Studio album by Chung Ha
- Released: February 15, 2021
- Recorded: 2020
- Studio: MNH Studios
- Genre: Pop
- Length: 60:47
- Language: Korean; English; Spanish
- Label: MNH; 88rising; Genie Music
- Producer: Vincenzo; R3hab; Fuxxy; The Black Skirts; Armadillo

Chung Ha chronology
Maxi Single (2019)	Querencia (2021)	Killing Me (2021)

Singles from Querencia
- 1. "Stay Tonight" Released: April 27, 2020; 2. "Play" Released: July 6, 2020; 3. "Dream of You" Released: November 27, 2020; 4. "X" Released: January 19, 2021; 5. "Bicycle" Released: February 15, 2021; 6. "Demente" Released: March 17, 2021

Querencia is the debut studio album by South Korean singer Chung Ha. It was released on February 15, 2021, under MNH Entertainment and 88rising. Originally set for a January 4 release, the album was delayed to February 15 after Chung Ha tested positive for COVID-19 on December 7, 2020, to focus on her recovery. It is the singer's first full-length album since her debut in 2017. The concept of the album lies in its title, "Querencia" which is a metaphysical concept in Spanish referring to a place where "one can be one's true self".

Querencia consists of 4 themes: Noble, Savage, Unknown, and Pleasures, and contains a total of 21 songs. The album features guest appearances from the DJ and record producer R3hab, Puerto Rican rapper Guaynaa and South Korean singer-songwriter Colde. Singer-songwriters Sumin and Baek Yerin were also involved in the making of this album, the two artists co-wrote "Bother Me" and "All Night Long" respectively. The album is primarily a pop record that combines EDM, synth-pop, R&B, afrobeat, house, korean ballad and latin-pop elements.

The album received both commercial success and generally favorable reviews from music critics, who complimented the wide variety of music genres featured in the album as well as the singer's musical growth. Querencia was supported by five singles: "Stay Tonight", "Play" featuring Changmo, "X", "Bicycle" and "Demente", the first two became top ten and twenty hits on the Gaon Digital Chart. The album also includes the singles "Everybody Has" and "Dream of You" with R3hab.

== Background ==
On March 10, MNH Entertainment announced that Chung Ha had signed with American agency, ICM Partners, for her America and global promotions. On April 12, 2020, Chung Ha released an ad image titled "pre-release single #1". According to the image, a photo teaser, an online cover image, and a music video teaser would be revealed on April 20–24. The image contained a dreamlike moonlight and hand-shaped sculptures that stretch toward it. On the April 21, the official cover of the single was revealed. The music video teasers were released on April 22 and 23. On June 18, Chung Ha released a teaser video for the second pre-release single titled "Play" and later announced that it would be released on July 6, 2020. On July 1, the official cover of the single was revealed. On the same day the music video teasers were released.

On November 18, the singer dropped a series of teasers on her social media channels and one of which states a new collaboration single "Dream of You" between the singer and an unnamed artist, which would be released on November 27, accompanied with "X", that was set to be released on December 10. Chung Ha also announced that her first studio album would be released on January 4, 2021. On November 23, 2020, the unnamed artist was revealed to be Dutch DJ and record producer R3hab. The performance video teaser was released on November 25.

On December 7, it was confirmed that Chung Ha has tested positive for COVID-19. She also missed the live press conference for the new show "Running Girls", but made appearance as her parts were shown in the premiere. On December 9, MNH Entertainment announced that Chung Ha's pre-release single "X" and upcoming studio album Querencia would be delayed to focus on her recovery. On January 11, 2021, Chung Ha announced that "X" will be released on January 19, while Querencia will be released on February 15. On January 12, it was announced that "Bicycle" will be released on February 15, as the fifth and primary single off of the album. The same day, the singer revealed the album track listing. On January 14, Chung Ha shared the online cover of the album.

== Composition ==
=== Music and lyrics ===
The album incorporated elements of dance, disco, latin pop, pop, EDM, afrobeats, synth-pop, dance-pop, house, salsa, tropical house, indie rock and other many genres. Querencia is Chung Ha's first full-length album which consists of a total of 21 tracks. The standard edition of the album is about one hour long. It features guest appearances from the DJ and record producer R3hab, Puerto Rican rapper Guaynaa and South Korean singer-songwriter Colde. At twenty-one tracks, Querencia is the longest material in the singer's catalogue. The album makes heavy use of acoustic guitar, bass guitar and fuzz guitar, pianos, funk bass, drum machines, synthesizers and sentimental string instruments. The word "Querencia" is Spanish and it has the meaning of a resting place. Continuing to touch on multiple genres and themes, Querencia is conveniently split into four sides: "Noble", "Savage", "Unknown" and "Pleasures" – each marked by one-minute interludes. "Noble", the album's opener, "buzzes through echoing beats and industrial noise", while "Savage" "takes the listeners into the pumping sounds of a club" and "Unknown" "delves deeper into the night with a skittering break beat". Transitioning into the ballad-filled side of Querencia, "Pleasures" sets up for "a vulnerable side of the singer". Through these four themes, the singer wanted to show a person who takes on challenges and musical concepts without being limited to one concept. Chung Ha participated in the composing and writing of "Bicycle" and "Byulharang (160504 + 170607)". NME compared the album to Dua Lipa's second studio album Future Nostalgia, stating that "instead of mirrorball-flecked sounds of the 70s, Querencia takes listeners on a globe-trotting trip through a melting pot of sounds and influences".

"The producers came up with the idea of the four components. I can't say that I have all four sides of the album in me, but I can certainly say that they show various aspects of me. I wanted to show in my own color that I'm a person who takes on challenges and musical concepts without being limited to one concept."

— Chung Ha discussing the sides of Querencia

=== Songs ===
"Bicycle" is "a collage of electric guitar, churning synths, bouncy piano and switching tempos" that expresses "the excitement and overwhelming energy of the moment when you step on the pedal" with the R&B, trap and bossa nova sound developed with the introduction of the intense fuzz guitar. "Masquerade" is a song with salsa swings and boogaloo beat where she entices a lover to search for her. "Flying on Faith" is a crunchy pop, electro-pop and R&B track with a vulnerable tone about a failing relationship where her partner stays weighed down by their emotions for an ex. Beginning with a guitar riff that eventually expands into a colourful explosion of synths, Chung Ha sings "She keeps weighing us down / I keep wondering if you wanna stay." The fifth track, "Luce Sicut Stellae", which "possesses mysterious, enticing production" with a bouncy beat, guitar, strings and echoing harmonies, is a "dreamy" and "romantic" track about following the starlight and embracing the moment. "Stay Tonight" is a disco and pop song captivated with its harp and piano riff elements. The future house production consists of booming bass sound in the chorus, 90s house beats, atmospheric electronics and a disco guitar. Thematically, the track is about love. The bass-heavy, house-pop cut, "Dream of You" is an electronic music track with a mix of house beat and a thick baseline. The track has a harmony of sounds including strings, brass, vocoder and synthesizer. The song also delivers "some of the singer's boldest, most seductive lyrics". The disco-tinged gloss song, "Bother Me" is a "classic-sound ING" dance-funk and deep house track with bass guitar, dreamy synths and a propulsive beat. In the song Chungha sings her frustrations and annoyance towards someone who does not reciprocate her efforts. "Chill" was described as a "quintessential" pop track".

"Play" featuring Changmo is a Latin pop-inspired dance track with moombahton and reggae influences. The song is about an exciting secret encounter between two lovers. "Demente" is a "catchy" pop song with reggaeton rhythms, aided by Puerto Rican rapper Guaynaa. Lyrically, the song tell a story of a confused love that causes great sadness due to the lack of interest of the other person. The song marks the first Latin and K-pop collaboration for a female Korean soloist and "highlights Chung Ha's refusal to be pinned down or limited by boundaries – either geographical or genre – meshing Korean, Spanish and the dancehall-derived beats into an infectious, vibrant cut". The bossa nova grooves song, "Lemon" featuring Colde has a funk-influenced R&B songtune, where she sings to her lover. "Byulharang (160504 + 170607)" is a ballad with soft acoustic strums. The track is named after her fandom, with the dates referring to both her debut with girl group I.O.I and, a year later, as a solo artist. "X" is a modern rock pop number characterized by a rich melody. It tells the story of having to rebuild yourself after being brought down by betrayal by others and coming out stronger than ever. "All Night Long" was described as a "glossy R&B slow jam". "Everybody Has" is a sentimental ballad that aims to comfort those feeling worn out and exhausted. The 90s-influenced, "Come N Goes" is dream-pop ode to acceptance that people and the emotions associated with them do not ever completely leave.

== Artwork and conception ==
According to Chung Ha's label 88Rising, she explained the album's meaning, where the title refers to "a place from which one's strength is drawn, where one feels at home; the place where you are your most authentic self". The singer also stated that: "This album is my querencia, and I hope it becomes yours too". In an interview held in April, the singer explained that Querencia means "a place to rest and gain energy" in Spanish, saying "she was drawn to the sound and meaning of the word and thought it was the perfect title for her album".

"I first got to know the word Querencia not by its dictionary definition but by heart. So to me, Querencia is really about what makes me myself. It could be time, an object, space, or a particular emotion that's shapeless. It's really hard to define what querencia is. In 2020, working on this album itself gave me the strength to move forward and gave me a sense of stability. So I named it Querencia."

— Chung Ha explaining the title of the album

=== Cover artwork ===
The singer released the online cover image of Querencia through her social media on January 14, 2021. The image shows Chung Ha staring intensely at one place, showcasing a fierce expression and wearing unique vivid color outfit with her hair slicked back, strong enough to break through the glass that is edited onto the artwork. Chung Ha explained that the cover "symbolizes breaking through any limitations that are visible or invisible – to be who she wants to be".

== Release and promotion ==
On January 11, 2021, MNH Entertainment uploaded a teaser poster with the album's name, also announcing the release date. Preorders for the album began the following day. On January 12, Chung Ha teased the title of the album's lead single "Bicycle" on Twitter. On the same day, the singer posted the album's track list and digital cover two days later. Eighteen months after Flourishing, Querencia was released worldwide on February 15, 2021, through MNH and 88rising in conjunction with the music video for "Bicycle". In celebration of her comeback, Chung Ha held an online showcase and press conference to talk about her debut studio album and also her recovery from COVID-19, for which she asymptomatically tested positive in December 2020.

For the album's physical release, Chung Ha and her label opted to have copies manufactured with as many environmentally-friendly materials as possible. According to MNH Entertainment, a regular single-disc CD is packaged with less lamination and sold in paper envelopes instead of plastic jewel cases. Chung Ha added "We also tried to minimize the use of lamination and other unnecessary plastics, except for photo cards, something very important for our fans," the artist told a local radio show.

=== Singles ===
"Stay Tonight", released on April 27, 2020, serves as the lead single of Querencia. An accompanying music video for the song, directed by Rima Yoon and Dongju Jang, was uploaded to Stone Music's and Chungha's YouTube channels simultaneously with the single's release. Commercially, the single charted in three countries. In South Korea, the song debuted at number 9 on the Gaon Digital Chart, while peaking at number 4 on the Billboard World Digital Songs chart. A promotional CD was made available through special events only.

"Play" featuring Changmo was released as the album's second single on July 6, 2020. An official music video for the song was released on August 28, 2020. The video shows Chung Ha as a matador to bullfight against a bright red sports car rather than a bull. It peaked at number 14 in South Korea and 17 on US World Digital Songs. The single was later repackaged into a maxi single, which consists of the two pre-released singles, together with "Stay Tonight" peaked at number 7 on the Gaon Album Chart with 12,613 sales.

"X" was released as the fourth single on January 19, 2021. The song peaked at number 100 in South Korea. "Bicycle" was released as the fifth single and title track on February 15, 2021, the same day the album was released. "Bicycle" debuted at number 38 on South Korean's Gaon Digital Chart for the chart issue dated February 14–20, 2021. The song debuted on Billboard World Digital Song Sales chart at number 11. A Spanish version of "Demente" with Guaynaa was released as the sixth single on March 17, 2021.

== Critical reception ==
Professional ratings
Review scores
Source	Rating
Beats Per Minute	76/100
Dork	5/5 stars
IZM	2.5/5 stars
NME	5/5 stars

NME critic Rhian Daly opined that "If its title refers to a place where you can be your true self, then this album reflects its creator as a curious, confident and passionate artist whose songs help make the world feel that little bit bigger again". For Rolling Stone India, Divyansha Dongre wrote that "with her debut album, Chung Ha demonstrates her versatility as a vocalist" but also "gives the audience a bigger glimpse of her rap and songwriting capabilities". Writing for Nylon, Crystal Bell stated that the album is a "testament to the singer's metamorphosis from a captivating performer into a true global superstar".

Writing for Dork, Abigail Firth deemed Querencia "an album where not only (as she says in the intro) her desires are protected, but where she's in control of them too". Billboard's Nolan Feeney praised the album's concept and production, writing "Querencia's ambitious and sophisticated sampling of global sounds may mark a turning point for K-pop's international reach". Writing for Beats Per Minute, JT Early gave the album a score of 76/100, describing the material as "an exciting and surprising debut" and stated that the material is "completely unrestrained in its ambition to be one of the 'big' pop albums". In a mixed review, Kim Doheon from IZM said that Querencia's "production, which relies in large part on the artist's versatility, does not create flashy moments, and Chung Ha, who faithfully performs a given song, does not exceed the level in singing, contrary to passionate dance performances"

=== Year-end lists ===
In June 2021, Billboard included Querencia on their "Best Albums of 2021 So Far: Staff Picks" list, with Nolan Feeeney stating that Chung Ha's debut album is "an ambitious undertaking on all levels" and adding that "there's a slinky sophistication that brings Querencia's cosmopolitan sounds together". NME also placed Querencia on their "The Best Albums of 2021 (So Far)" list. South China Morning Post included the album on their "Best K-pop albums of 2021 so far" list, with Tamar Herman opining that it "broken into four-quarters it feels like a guided tour through the musical museum of Chung Ha."

"Querencia" on critic lists
Critic/Publication	List	Rank	Ref.
Billboard	The 50 Best Albums of 2021 So Far	—N/a	
Idology	Top 10 Albums of 2021	—N/a	
NME	The Best Albums of 2021 (So Far)	—N/a	
SCMP	Best K-pop albums of 2021 so far	—N/a	
SCMP	25 Best K-pop Albums of 2021	7	
PopCrush	10 Best Pop Albums of 2021 (So Far!)	—N/a	
Time	Best K-pop Songs and Albums of 2021	—N/a	

== Commercial performance ==
Commercially, Querencia debuted at number 1 on the Gaon Retail Album Chart at 1 pm KST with 1518 sales in its first hour of tracking. In addition, all of the album tracks charted within the Top 100 of the notable South Korean streaming service, Bugs. The title track "Bicycle" also debuted at number 2 on streaming services Bugs and Genie. At the end of Querencia's first day, it sold 8921 copies in Korea, marking a new record for Chung Ha, beating out her Maxi Single by 4891 sales. Upon release, Querencia reached the top three on the all-genre US iTunes sales chart, only behind Morgan Wallen's Dangerous: The Double Album and The Pretty Reckless' Death by Rock and Roll. On February 27, Querencia debuted and peaked at number 10 on the US Billboard World Albums chart and at number 5 on the Billboard Heatseekers Albums, making it her second entry on the latter.

== Track listing ==
Querencia track listing
No.	Title	Lyrics	Music	Arrangement	Length
1.	"Side A (Noble)"	Vincenzo	Vincenzo	Vincenzo	1:07
2.	"Bicycle"	Vincenzo; Chung Ha	Daniel Kim; Jeremy G (FutureSound); Dawn Elektra	Daniel Kim; Vincenzo	2:59
3.	"Masquerade"	Jinri (Full8loom)	Jinri (Full8loom); Glory Face (Full8loom); Yuka (Full8loom)	Glory Face (Full8loom); Yuka (Full8loom)	3:17
4.	"Flying on Faith"	Mich Hansen; Daniel Mirza; Daniel Davidsen; Wayne Hector; Lucas Secon	Mich Hansen; Daniel Mirza; Daniel Davidsen; Wayne Hector; Lucas Secon	Cutfather; Mirza; Davidsen	3:06
5.	"Luce Sicut Stellae"	Lee Seu-ran	Hotsauce; Maria Marcus	Hotsauce	3:11
6.	"Side B (Savage)"		Vincenzo	Vincenzo	1:01
7.	"Stay Tonight"	Vincenzo; Any Masingga; Fuxxy; Anna Timgren	Vincenzo; Masingga; Fuxxy; Timgren	Vincenzo; Masingga	3:37
8.	"Dream of You" (with R3hab)	Peter Hanna; Rebecca King	Michael Fatkin; Vincenzo	Fatkin; Vincenzo	3:13
9.	"Bother Me" (짜증 나게 만들어 (Note: Jjajeung Nage Mandeureo lit. "Make It Annoying"))	Sumin	Slom; Sumin; DJ Soulscape	Slom	3:22
10.	"Chill" (Chill해 (Note: Chill-hae))	earattack; Ra.L	earattack; Larmook	earattack; Larmook	3:26
11.	"Side C (Unknown)"		Vincenzo	Vincenzo	1:01
12.	"Play" (featuring Changmo)	Vincenzo; Masingga; Fuxxy; Timgren; Changmo	Vincenzo; Masingga; Fuxxy; Timgren; Changmo	Vincenzo; Fuxxy	3:20
13.	"Demente" (featuring Guaynaa)	Lao Ra; Guaynaa; Vincenzo	Tinashé Fazakerley; Laura Carvajalino Avila	Rationale	2:43
14.	"Lemon" (featuring Colde)	Colde	Colde; Stally; Johnny; Chiic	Colde; Stally; Johnny; Chiic	3:22
15.	"Byulharang (160504 + 170607)" (별하랑 (160504 + 170607))	Chung Ha; Vincenzo; Fuxxy; Any Masingga	Chung Ha; Vincenzo; Fuxxy; Any Masingga	Vincenzo; Fuxxy	3:43
16.	"Side D (Pleasures)"		Vincenzo	Vincenzo	1:03
17.	"X" (걸어온 길에 꽃밭 따윈 없었죠 (Note: Georeo-on Gire Kkotbat Ttawin Eopseotjyo lit. "There Was No Flower Garden On The Road"))	Cliff Lin; The Black Skirts	Lin; The Black Skirts	Lin; The Black Skirts	4:15
18.	"All Night Long"	Yerin Baek	Yerin Baek; Cloud	Cloud	3:45
19.	"Everybody Has" (솔직히 지친다 (Note: Soljikhi Jichinda lit. "Honestly Tired"))	Armadillo	Armadillo	Armadillo	3:42
20.	"Comes N Goes"	Vincenzo; Masingga; Fuxxy; Timgren	Vincenzo; Masingga; Fuxxy; Timgren	Vincenzo	3:31
21.	"Querencia (Epilogue)"	Vincenzo	Vincenzo	Vincenzo	1:34
Total length:					60:47

== Personnel ==
- Chung Ha – lead vocals (all tracks), writer (2, 15), composer (15), background vocals (15, 18)
- Vincenzo – composer (tracks 1, 6, 7, 11, 12, 15, 16, 20, 21), arranger (1, 2, 6, 11, 15, 16, 20, 21), drums (1, 2, 6, 11, 16, 20, 21), electric piano (1, 6, 16, 21), guitar (1, 2, 16, 20, 21), mixing engineers (1, 6, 11, 16, 21), synthesizer (1, 2, 6, 8, 11, 15, 16, 20, 21), writer (1, 2, 6–8, 11–13, 15, 16, 20, 21), bass (2), direction assistant vocals (2, 4, 13), background vocals (4), recording engineer (6, 11, 16, 21), strings (8), piano (11, 20), flute (15), masterer (21)
- 정은경 – engineer (track 1), recording engineer (2–5, 8, 9, 13–15, 17, 18, 20), mixing engineer (15), composer (18)
- Daniel Kim – composer, arranger, bass, drums, guitar, synthesizer and writer (track 2)
- Dawn Elektra – composer, background vocals and writer (track 2)
- Jeremy G – composer and writer (track 2)
- 김연서 – background vocals (tracks 2, 4)
- Fuxxy – direction assistant vocals (tracks 2, 4, 13), background vocals (4), composer (7, 12, 15, 20), writer (7, 12, 15, 20), arranger (15), drums (15), piano (15)
- 윤원권 – mixing engineers (tracks 2, 4, 5, 8, 10, 13, 20)
- Gloryface – composer, arranger and writer (track 3)
- Jinli – composer and writer (track 3)
- Yuka – composer, arranger and writer (track 3)
- 전부연 – assistant mixing engineer (track 3)
- 김가영 – bass, drums and synthesizer (track 3)
- 장준호 – bass, drums and synthesizer (track 3)
- 조씨아저씨 – mixing engineer (track 3)
- Daniel Davidsen – composer, arranger, guitar, synthesizer and writer (track 4)
- Daniel Mirza – composer, arranger, drums, piano and writer (track 4)
- Lucas Secon – composer and writer (track 4)
- Cutfather – composer, arranger, drums and writer (track 4)
- Wayne Hector – composer and writer (track 4)
- Hotsauce – composer, arranger, bass, drums, guitar, synthesizer and writer (track 5)
- Maria Marcus – composer (track 5), writer (track 5)
- Lee Seu Ran – writer (track 5)
- Anna Timgren – composer (tracks 7, 12, 20), writer (tracks 7, 12, 20)
- Any Masingga – composer (tracks 7, 12, 15, 20), writer (tracks 7, 12, 15, 20), guitar (track 20)
- R3hab – producer and writer (track 8)
- Michael Fatkin – composer, bass, drums, piano, synthesizer and writer (track 8)
- Park Jung-Un – masterer (track 8)
- Kim Su Jung – recording engineer (track 8)
- Peter Hanna – writer (track 8)
- Rebecca King – writer (track 8)
- slom – composer, arranger, drum programming, guitar, keyboards, mixing engineers, synthesizer and writer (track 9)
- DJ Soulscape – composer, drum programming and writer (track 9)
- Sumin – background vocals and writer (track 9)
- Park Min June – mixing engineers (track 9)
- 김수정 – recording engineer (tracks 9, 13, 17)
- Larmook – composer, arranger, drums, synthesizer and writer (track 10)
- earattack – composer, arranger, bass, drums, synthesizer and writer (track 10)
- 페리 – background vocals (track 10)
- ral – writer (track 10)
- changmo – featured artist, composer and writer (track 12)
- Laura Carvajalino Avila – composer and writer (track 13)
- Tinashé Fazakerley – composer, arranger, bass, drums, piano, synthesizer and writer (track 13)
- Guaynaa – featured artist (track 13)
- Jean Carlos Santiago – writer (track 13)
- Chiic – composer, arranger, bass and guitar (track 14)
- Colde – featured artist, composer and arranger (track 14)
- JOHNNY – composer, arranger, bass and synthesizer (track 14)
- Stally – composer, arranger and drums (track 14)
- Milena – background vocals (track 14)
- Stay Tuned – mixing engineers (track 14)
- 문준호 – writer (track 14)
- 채욱진 – writer (track 14)
- 한희수 – writer (track 14)
- 사승호 – guitar (track 15)
- DJ HotBoyzZ – producer, composer and arranger (track 17)
- The Black Skirts – background vocals (track 17)
- Cliff Lin – guitar, mixing engineer and writer (track 17)
- Bran Cho – writer (track 17)
- 백예린 – composer and writer (track 18)
- 구름 – arranger, background vocals, keyboards, mixing engineers, recording engineer and writer (track 18)
- Armadillo – producer, writer (track 19)
- 우정아 – background vocals (track 20)

== Charts ==
Chart performance for Querencia
Chart (2021)	Peak position
South Korean Albums (Gaon)	6
US Heatseekers Albums (Billboard)	5
US World Albums (Billboard)	10

== Sales ==
Sales figures for Querencia
Region	Certification	Certified units/sales
South Korea	—	31,800

== Release history ==
Release dates and formats for Querencia
Region	Date	Format	Label	Ref.
Various	February 15, 2021	CD; digital download; streaming	MNH; 88rising; 12Tone Music	
South Korea	February 15, 2021	CD; digital download; streaming	MNH; Stone Music Entertainment; Genie Music	
