= Demente (song) =

2021 single by Chung Ha and Guaynaa

- Spanish version cover

Single by Chung Ha and Guaynaa

from the album Querencia
- Language: Korean; Spanish
- Released: March 17, 2021
- Recorded: 2020
- Genre: Latin-pop; pop; reggaeton
- Length: 2:43
- Label: MNH; 88rising
- Songwriters: Lao Ra; Guaynaa; Vincenzo; Tinashé Fazakerley
- Producers: Vincenzo; Fuxxy

Chung Ha singles chronology
"Why Don't We" (2021)	"Demente" (2021)	"My Lips Like Warm Coffee" (2021)

Guaynaa singles chronology
"Monterrey" (2021)	"Demente" (2021)	"Calle" (2021)

Music video
- "Demente (MNH)" on YouTube "Demente (Stone)" on YouTube

"Demente" is a song by South Korean singer Chung Ha and Puerto Rican rapper Guaynaa from her first Korean studio album Querencia. It was released on February 15, 2021, through MNH and 88rising. The song is the thirteenth track on the album, and was written by Lao Ra, Guaynaa, Tinashé Fazakerley and Vincenzo and produced by him and Fuxxy. "Demente" solidifies the singer's "versatility as she flawlessly sings in Spanish and Korean" over a reggaeton beat. The song marks the first collaboration between a Korean female soloist and a Latin singer. Lyrically, the song tell a story of a confused love that causes great sadness due to the lack of interest from a lover.

On February 18, 2021, an animated lyric video of the song was released on YouTube. A Spanish version of the song was released with its music video on 17 March, 2021, as the sixth and last single from Querencia.

== Background ==
"Demente" is under the "Unknown" chapter in Querencia, since the song fits in with the big unknown of her speaking Spanish. Chung Ha took up Spanish lessons and relied on a fluent friend to coach her throughout the recording. The early version of "Play" made the singer interested in Latin music. After she linked up with 88rising, where Miyashiro suggested she progressed into Latin music further, and helped bring "Demente" to life. 88rising and Chung Ha worked with a lot of different Latin producers on it and stated "that this is not even reggaetón, rather like a different genre of older, classical pop music. Chung Ha did not want to just infuse a song with some sounds, she really wanted to do it."

On March 15, 2021, Chung Ha announced through social media that the Spanish version of "Demente", would be released on March 17, 2021. Its cover art was also posted that day. On March 16, the singer dropped a teaser for the music video.

== Composition ==
"Demente" is a Latin-pop and pop song with reggaeton rhythms, aided by Puerto Rican rapper Guaynaa. It was written by Lao Ra, Guaynaa, Tinashé Fazakerley, Laura Carvajalino Avilaand, Vincenzo and produced by him and Fuxxy. The song runs for two minutes and forty-three seconds. In terms of musical notation, the song is composed in the key of G♭ major with a tempo of 100 beats per minute. The song marks the first Latin and K-pop collaboration for a female Korean soloist and "highlights Chung Ha's refusal to be pinned down or limited by boundaries – either geographical or genre – meshing Korean, Spanish and the dancehall-derived beats into an infectious, vibrant cut". Lyrically, the song tell a story of a confused love that causes great sadness due to the lack of interest of the other person.

"I personally enjoy Latin music very much, and I always wanted to try that genre. I’m really glad that this collaboration happened, and I’m really excited about it! It was my first time recording in Spanish, and it was something completely new to me. It wasn’t easy, but I felt a sense of achievement afterward. I think this track is a really good fit for Querencia because so many artists worked on it together. I’m also grateful for having the chance to reach out a little bit more to Spanish speakers."

— Chung Ha talking about collaborating with Guaynaa

== Music video ==
On March 15, the singer confirmed the music video and announced that it was scheduled for release on March 17, 2021. On the March 16, Chung Ha released a music video teaser for the Spanish version of "Demente". It was directed by VISHOP (Vikings League). The song’s accompanying music video captures Chung Ha performing the song in a luxurious hotel lobby in various glamorous outfits. Meanwhile, featured artist Guaynaa appears remotely from halfway across the world.

== Credits and personnel ==
Credits adapted from Tidal.

- Chung Ha - vocals
- Guaynaa - writer, vocals
- Tinashé Fazakerley - writer, bass, drums, piano, synths
- Vicenzo - writer, producer, vocal director
- Fuxxy - producer, vocal director
- Lao Ra - writer
- Earcandy - mix engineer
- Yoon Won Kwon - mix engineer
- Park Jeong Eon - mastering engineer
- Jung Eun Kyung - record engineer
- Kim Su Jeong - record engineer

== Charts ==
Chart performance for "Demente"
Chart (2021)	Peak position
South Korea (Gaon Download)	134

== Release history ==
Release dates and formats for "Demente"
Region	Date	Format	Label	Ref.
Various	February 15, 2021	Digital download; streaming	MNH; 88rising	
