= MNH Entertainment =

South Korean entertainment management company

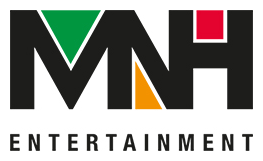
- Native name: 엠앤에이치엔터테인먼트
- Company type: Private
- Industry: Music
- Genre: K-pop; R&B; EDM
- Founded: November 18, 2014; 11 years ago
- Founder: Kim Won-seop (김원섭)
- Headquarters: Seoul, South Korea
- Area served: Asia
- Website: mnhenter.com

MNH Entertainment (Korean: 엠앤에이치엔터테인먼트) is a privately held multinational entertainment group and talent agency based in Seoul. Founded in November 2014 by Lee Ju-seop, a former manager at JYP Entertainment. The company was founded on 18 November 2014.

== History ==
The company was formed on November 18, 2014.

In 2016, trainee Kim Chung-ha was sent to participate in the survival girl group television show Produce 101. She finished fourth and debuted as part of I.O.I. After the disbandment of I.O.I, MNH planned for Chungha to debut as a soloist.

In 2019, teasers for MNH's new girl group, BVNDIT was released. It was the first girl group produced by MNH Entertainment. The group consists of 5 members and made their debut on 10 April 2019 with "Hocus Pocus". On 15 May 2019, BVNDIT released their song titled "Dramatic".

On January 28, 2020, MNH revealed their plans for a new music project New.wav, which aims for the agency artists to more frequently interact with the public through diverse music, apart from their regular album releases. MNH introduced their first actor, Yoon Jae-yong. He made his acting debut in the SBS drama Nobody Knows.

== Artists ==
=== Recording artists ===
==== Groups ====
- 8Turn

==== Soloists ====
- EJel
- Lim Sang-hyun
- Vvon

==== Notable trainees ====
- Seok Matthew (Zerobaseone)

== Former artists ==
- Yoon Jae-yong (2020)
- Bvndit (2019–2022)
  - Yiyeon (2019–2022)
  - Songhee (2019–2022)
  - Jungwoo (2019–2022)
  - Simyeong (2019–2022)
  - Seungeun (2019–2022)
- Chungha (2016–2023)

== Discography ==
Artist	Title	Date	Format	Language	Distribution
Chungha	"Week"	April 21, 2017	Digital single	Korean	CJ E&M Music
Chungha	Hands on Me	June 7, 2017	Extended play	Korean	CJ E&M Music
Chungha	Offset	January 17, 2018	Extended play	Korean	CJ E&M Music
Chungha	Blooming Blue	July 18, 2018	Extended play	Korean	Stone Music Entertainment
Chungha	XII	January 2, 2019	Single album	Korean	Stone Music Entertainment
Bvndit	Bvndit, Be Ambitious!	April 10, 2019	Single album	Korean	Stone Music Entertainment
Bvndit	"Dramatic"	May 15, 2019	Digital single	Korean	Stone Music Entertainment
Chungha	Flourishing	June 24, 2019	Extended play	Korean	Stone Music Entertainment
Bvndit	Be!	November 5, 2019	Extended play	Korean	Stone Music Entertainment
Chungha	"Loveship" (with Paul Kim)	January 21, 2020	Digital single	Korean	Stone Music Entertainment, Neuron Music, Kakao M
Bvndit	"Cool"	February 6, 2020	Digital single	English	Stone Music Entertainment
Chungha	"Everybody Has"	February 29, 2020	Digital single	Korean	Stone Music Entertainment
Bvndit	"Children"	April 20, 2020	Digital single	Korean	Stone Music Entertainment
Chungha	"Stay Tonight"	April 27, 2020	Digital single	Korean	Stone Music Entertainment
Bvndit	Carnival	May 13, 2020	Extended play	Korean	Stone Music Entertainment
Chungha	"Be Yourself"	June 9, 2020	Digital single	Korean	Stone Music Entertainment
Chungha	"Play" (feat. Changmo)	July 6, 2020	Digital single	Korean	Stone Music Entertainment
Chungha	"Bad Boy" (with Christopher)	September 23, 2020	Digital single	English	Stone Music Entertainment, Warner Music Korea, Parlophone Denmark
Chungha	"Dream of You" (feat. R3hab)	November 27, 2020	Digital single	English	Stone Music Entertainment
Chungha	"X"	January 19, 2021	Digital single	Korean	Stone Music Entertainment
Chungha	Querencia	February 15, 2021	Studio album	Korean	Genie Music, Stone Music Entertainment (South Korea); 88rising, 12Tone Music (worldwide)
Chungha	"Demente" (Spanish Version) (with Guaynaa)	March 17, 2021	Digital single	Spanish	Stone Music, 88rising, 12Tone Music
Lim Sang-hyun	"A Rainy Night"	July 25, 2021	Digital single	Korean	Stone Music Entertainment
Lim Sang-hyun	"I'd Rather"	October 21, 2021	Digital single	Korean	Stone Music Entertainment
Chungha	"Killing Me"	November 29, 2021	Single album	Korean	88rising
Lim Sang-hyun	"Honey Milk Tea"	March 29, 2022	Digital single	Korean	Stone Music Entertainment
Vvon	"Hold Up" (feat. Coogie & Sumin)	April 21, 2022	Digital single	Korean	Stone Music Entertainment
Bvndit	Re-Original	May 25, 2022	Extended play	Korean	Stone Music Entertainment
Vvon	"Why" (feat. Hoody)	July 5, 2022	Digital single	Korean	Stone Music Entertainment
Chungha	Bare & Rare, Pt. 1	July 11, 2022	Studio album	Korean	Stone Music Entertainment, 88rising
Vvon	"Step" (feat. Kim Seung-min)	November 16, 2022	Digital single	Korean	Stone Music Entertainment
8Turn	8TurnRise	January 30, 2023	Extended play	Korean	Genie Music, Stone Music Entertainment
Lim Sang-hyun	Firsthand Pt. 2	April 21, 2023	Single album	Korean	NHN Bugs Corp, Stone Music Entertainment

=== Projects ===
- New.wav - music project

== Awards and nominations ==
Year	Award	Category	Nominated work	Recipient	Result	Ref.
2020	9th Gaon Chart Music Awards	Producer/Record Production of the Year	"Gotta Go"	MNH Entertainment	Won	
