= Bicycle (song) =

2021 single by Chung Ha

Single by Chung Ha

from the album Querencia
- Language: Korean; English
- Released: February 15, 2021
- Recorded: 2020
- Genre: R&B; pop-trap
- Length: 2:59
- Label: MNH; 88rising
- Songwriters: Vincenzo; Chung Ha
- Producers: Daniel Kim; Jeremy "FutureSound" G; Dawn Elektra

Chung Ha singles chronology
"X" (2021)	"Bicycle" (2021)	"Why Don't We" (2021)

Music video
- "Bicycle (MNH)" on YouTube "Bicycle (Stone)" on YouTube

"Bicycle" is a song by South Korean singer Chung Ha. It was released on February 15, 2021, through MNH and 88rising as the title track from Chung Ha's first Korean-language studio album, Querencia. It was originally scheduled to be released on January 4, 2021, however it was delayed after she was diagnosed with COVID-19. Musically, "Bicycle" incorporates R&B, trap and dance-pop beats developed with the introduction of the intense fuzz guitar, and expresses excitement and the feelings of overwhelming energy of the moment.

== Background and release ==
On January 11, 2021, Chung Ha announced that her debut Korean-language studio album titled Querencia would be released on February 15, 2021. One day later, it was announced that "Bicycle" would be the title track for the upcoming album. The song is described as a R&B pop song that expresses the excitement and overwhelming energy.

On February 15, 2021, the single "Bicycle" was released via digital download and streaming, in conjunction with its accompanying music video.

== Commercial performance ==
"Bicycle" debuted at number 38 on South Korean's Gaon Digital Chart for the chart issue dated February 14–20, 2021. The song debuted on Billboard World Digital Song Sales chart at number 11 on February 25, 2021.

== Credits and personnel ==
Credits adapted from the description section of the music video and Melon.

- Lyrics by VINCENZO and Chung Ha
- Composed by Daniel Kim, Jeremy G (Future Sound) and Dawn Elektra
- Arranged by Daniel Kim and VINCENZO
- Instruments by Daniel Kim and VINCENZO
- Background vocals by Emily Yeonseo Kim and Dawn Elektra
- Directed by Fuxxy and VINCENZO
- Recorded by Jung Eunkyeng at Ingrid Studio
- Mixed by Yoon Wonkwon at Studio DDeepKick
- Mastered by Park Jung-Un at Honey Butter Studio

== Accolades ==
Year-end lists for "Bycicle"
Critic/Publication	List	Rank	Ref.
NME	The 25 best K-Pop songs of 2021	21	

== Charts ==
Chart performance for "Bicycle"
Chart (2021)	Peak position
South Korea (Gaon Digital)	38
South Korea (Gaon Download)	4
South Korea (Kpop Hot 100)	32
US World Digital Songs (Billboard)	11

== Release history ==
Release formats for "Bicycle"
Region	Date	Format	Label	Ref.
Various	February 15, 2021	CD; download; streaming	MNH; Stone Music; 88rising	
