= Play (Chung Ha song) =

2020 single by Chung Ha

Single by Chung Ha featuring Changmo

from the album Querencia
- Language: Korean; English
- Released: July 6, 2020
- Recorded: 2020
- Genre: Dance; Latin pop; moombahton
- Length: 3:19
- Label: MNH; Stone Music
- Songwriters: VINCENZO; Any Masingga; Fuxxy; Anna Timgren; Changmo
- Producers: VINCENZO; Any Masingga; Fuxxy; Anna Timgren

Chung Ha singles chronology
"Be Yourself" (2020)	"Play" (2020)	"Bad Boy" (2020)

Changmo singles chronology
"Countin My Guap" (2020)	"Play" (2020)	"Swoosh Flow" (2020)

Chung Ha chronology
Flourishing (2019)	Maxi Single (2019)	Querencia (2021)

Music video
- "Play (MNH)" on YouTube "Play (Stone)" on YouTube

"Play" is a song by South Korean singer Chung Ha, which features Changmo. The song was released on July 6, 2020, by MNH Entertainment and Stone Music as the second single from her first Korean-language studio album Querencia. The single was later repackaged into a maxi single, which consists of the two pre-released singles, together with "Stay Tonight" peaked at number 7 on the Gaon Album Chart with 12,613 sales.

== Background and promotion ==
On June 21, 2020, Chung Ha released an ad image titled "PRE-RELEASE SINGLE #2". According to the image, photo teasers, a concept clip, concept images, track list, an online cover image, and a music video teaser would be revealed on June 24 – July 3.

On July 1, the official cover of the single was revealed. The music video teasers were released on July 1 and 2.

== Composition and lyrics ==
"Play" was written and produced by VINCENZO, Any Masingga, Fuxxy and Anna Timgren and Changmo. It runs for three minutes and nineteen seconds. The song is a Latin pop with various elements of reggaeton arranged in each section. The guitar sound at the verse is scattered off the beat with an iconic reggae rhythm, warms the space with an acoustic guitar sound and a synthesizer sound that unfolds instantly from the pre-chorus, then a brass section and dembow rhythm with the climax chorus light a heart to everyone with a feast of rhythm.".

Stone Music said that "Play" continues the voice of the deep night expressed by the previous single "Stay Tonight", it contains the story of a more beautiful hot afternoon than the night which blurred the boundary between day and night. After a secret and private moment, the lyrics were filled with bold and striking words like the angle of the midsummer sun. Starting with Remedy, Changmo's rap which presented a new narrative combining the title of Chung Ha's singles was perfectly harmonized to complete a picture as if drawing a pupil.

== Critical reception ==
Writing for Dazed, Taylor Glasby ranked "Play" number 28 on their list of 40 Best K-pop songs of 2020 – commenting, "Latin influences turn the energy right up on this summer banger, perfect for Chung Ha who thrives within big performances, and the music video provides a bold frame for her multifaceted abilities."

== Music video and promotion ==
The music video was released on July 6, 2020, and in the music video for the track, Chung Ha steps into the shoes of a matador to bullfight against a bright red sports car. She can be seen waving a red cloth around and grooving through choreography with her dancers. As a pre-release single, Chung Ha promoted for only a week.

== Track listing ==
No.	Title	Lyrics	Music	Arrangement	Length
1.	"Play"	VINCENZO; Any Masingga; Fuxxy; Anna Timgren; Ku Chang-mo	VINCENZO; Any Masingga; Fuxxy; Anna Timgren; Ku Chang-mo	VINCENZO; Fuxxy	3:19
Total length:					3:19

Maxi Single (CD repackaged)
No.	Title	Lyrics	Music	Arrangement	Length
1.	"Play"	VINCENZO; Any Masingga; Fuxxy; Anna Timgren; Ku Chang-mo	VINCENZO; Any Masingga; Fuxxy; Anna Timgren; Ku Chang-mo	VINCENZO; Fuxxy	3:19
2.	"Stay Tonight"	VINCENZO; Any Masingga; Fuxxy; Anna Timgren	VINCENZO; Any Masingga; Fuxxy; Anna Timgren	VINCENZO; Any Masingga	3:37
Total length:					6:56

== Credits and personnel ==
Credits adapted from the description of the "Play" music video.

- Lyrics – VINCENZO, Fuxxy, Any Masingga, Anna Timgren, 창모
- Composition – VINCENZO, Fuxxy, Any Masingga, Anna Timgren, 창모
- Arranged – VINCENZO, Fuxxy
- Drum Performed – VINCENZO
- Synthesizer Performed – Fuxxy
- Bass Performed – VINCENZO
- Keyboard Performed – Fuxxy
- Guitar Performed – 영
- Background Vocals – 김연서
- Recording Engineer – 정은경, 김지현 at Ingrid Studio, CHANGMO at Neo Deokso
- Mixing Engineer – 윤원권 at Studio DDeepKick
- Mastering Engineer – 박정언 at Honey Butter Studio

== Accolades ==
Awards and nominations
Year	Organization	Category	Result	Ref.
2021	10th Gaon Chart Music Awards	Artist of the Year – Digital Music (July 2020)	Nominated	

== Charts ==
=== Weekly charts ===
Weekly chart performance for "Play"
Chart (2020)	Peak position
South Korea (Gaon)	14
South Korea (Kpop Hot 100)	9
US World Digital Song Sales (Billboard)	17

=== Monthly charts ===
Monthly chart performance for "Play"
Chart (2020)	Peak position
South Korea (Gaon)	24

=== Year-end charts ===
2020 year-end chart performance for "Play"
Chart (2020)	Peak position
South Korea (Gaon)	125

== Release history ==
Release formats for "Play"
Region	Date	Format	Label	Ref.
Various	July 6, 2020	CD; download; streaming	MNH; Stone Music	
