= Everybody Has =

2020 single by Chung Ha

Single by Chung Ha

from the album New.wav and Querencia
- Released: February 29, 2020
- Recorded: 2020
- Genre: K-pop; sentimental ballad
- Length: 3:42
- Label: MNH; Stone
- Songwriter: Armadillo
- Producer: Armadillo

Chung Ha singles chronology
"Loveship" (2020)	"Everybody Has" (2020)	"Stay Tonight" (2020)

Music video
- "Everybody Has (MNH)" on YouTube "Everybody Has (Stone)" on YouTube

"Everybody Has" (Korean: 솔직히 지친다; RR: Soljikhi Jichinda) is a song recorded by South Korean singer Chung Ha released on February 29, 2020, by MNH Entertainment and distributed by Stone Music Entertainment. The song is part of MNH Entertainment's project album New.wav and of Chung Ha's first full-length studio album Querencia.

== Background ==
On January 28, 2020, MNH revealed their plans for a new music project New.wav, which aims for the agency artists to more frequently interact with the public through diverse music, apart from their regular album releases. Chung Ha was the second artist to take part, with teasers dropping weeks before the released of the track.

== Release ==
The song was released through various music portals, including iTunes. A sero live version was released on February 29, 2020, on Dingo Music.

== Composition ==
"Everybody Has" is a sentimental ballad written by Armadillo. The lyrics and the track itself aims to comfort those feeling worn out and exhausted.

== Commercial performance ==
"Everybody Has" was ranked first on major streaming sites, such as Soribada, Genie Music and Bugs. It charted at No. 31 on the Gaon Digital Chart.

== Music video ==
The music video was released on February 29, 2020, which features actress Jo Bo-ah and directed by 비숍 of Vikings League. Jo was seen leaving the city at night for a peaceful countryside.

== Charts ==
Chart (2020)	Peak position
South Korea (Gaon)	31
South Korea (K-pop Hot 100)	38

== Release history ==
Region	Date	Format	Label
Various	February 29, 2020	Digital download, streaming	MNH Entertainment, Stone Music Entertainment
