= Loveship =

2020 single by Paul Kim and Chung Ha

Single by Paul Kim and Chung Ha
- Released: January 21, 2020
- Recorded: 2019
- Genre: K-pop; R&B; Soul
- Length: 4:57
- Label: MNH; Neuron; Kakao M
- Songwriter: Paul Kim
- Producer: Donnie J

Paul Kim singles chronology
"Big Heart" (2019)	"Loveship" (2020)

Chung Ha singles chronology
"Remedy" (2019)	"Loveship" (2020)	"Everybody Has" (2020)

Music video
- "Loveship (MNH)" on YouTube "Loveship (1theK)" on YouTube

"Loveship" is a collaboration single by South Korean singers Paul Kim and Chung Ha released on January 21, 2020, by MNH Entertainment and Neuron Music and distributed by Kakao M. The acoustic version was released on January 29, 2020.

== Background ==
On January 13, 2020, Paul Kim and Chung Ha revealed details about the collaboration they have been working on since the end of 2019. Music and photo teasers were released before the official release of the single.

== Composition ==
The R&B song was written and composed by Paul Kim and arranged by Joseph K. The lyrics are about the struggles of two people not being able to express their love for each other.

== Music video ==
The music video was directed by HOBIN and released on January 21, 2020.

== Awards and nominations ==
Year	Award	Category	Result	Ref.
2021	10th Gaon Chart Music Awards	Artist of the Year – Digital Music (January 2020)	Nominated	

== Charts ==
Chart (2020)	Peak position
South Korea (Gaon)	12
South Korea (K-pop Hot 100)	22

== Release history ==
Region	Date	Format	Label
Various	January 21, 2020	Digital download, streaming	MNH Entertainment, Neuron Music, Kakao M
