= Guaynaa =

Puerto Rican rapper

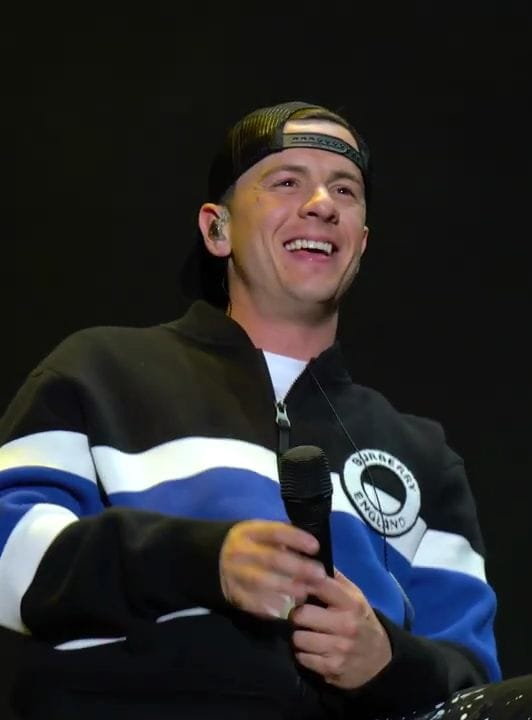
- Guaynaa in 2022

Background information
- Born: Jean Carlos Santiago Pérez; September 16, 1992 (age 33); Caguas, Puerto Rico
- Genres: Reggaeton; Salsa
- Occupations: Rapper; singer
- Labels: Universal Latino; Republic
- Spouse: Lele Pons (m. 2023)

Jean Carlos Santiago Pérez (born September 16, 1992), known professionally as Guaynaa, is a Puerto Rican rapper and singer. He is signed to American music label Universal Music Latino.

== Biography ==
Jean Carlos Santiago Pérez was born in Caguas, Puerto Rico, to a Puerto Rican father and a Cuban mother. Before pursuing a musical career, he was working as a phone salesman in a mall. He was going to become a petrochemical engineer before working in music. As of March 2023 he is married to Venezuelan-American actress, singer, YouTuber, and author Lele Pons who he has been in a relationship with since December 2020.

== Career ==
He gained fame due to the success of his song "Rebota", which reached number 35 on the Billboard Hot Latin Songs chart in April 2019 and has received over 300 million views on YouTube. The song's remix featured Becky G, Farruko, Nicky Jam and Sech in July 2019 and was later certified 4× platinum by the RIAA's Latin division. After the success of "ReBoTa", he signed a joint record deal with Universal Music Latino and Republic Records.

In August 2019, Guaynaa appeared on a remix of PJ Sin Suela's single "La Pelua" with Jon Z and Rafa Pabón. In October 2019, he collaborated with Spanish rapper Mala Rodríguez on the single "Dame Bien". In November 2019, he made a song with Yandel, saying that "it was a dream come true". He also has collaborated with Mon Laferte and Mariah Angeliq, among others.

In February 2020, he received a Premios Heat nomination, along with Paloma Mami and Cami. In 2021, he was featured on Korean singer Chungha's debut studio album, Querencia, on the track "Demente".

In late 2024, Guaynaa has made songs in the Cumbia genre. On September 19 2024, he collaborated with the Norteño group Duelo on the song “Cala En El Alma”. 2 months later, he released “Matame de a Poquito” alongside Mexican grupero group Bronco. Both songs were featured on his Cumbia y Amor album, which was released in 2025, and has collabed with other artists such as Ximena Sariñana and Grupo Rafaga.

In late 2025, Guaynaa switched over to the Salsa genre. He released a cover of Joan Sebastian’s “Lobo Domesticado”, and then released a popular single titled “Ven Devorame Otra Vez”

== Discography ==
=== Studio albums ===
List of EPs, with selected details and certifications
Title	Studio album details	Certifications
La República	Released: October 29, 2021; Label: Republic, Universal Latino; Formats: LP, cassette, digital download	
Capitulaciones (with Lele Pons)	Released: April 20, 2023; Label: Shots, Interscope; Formats: digital download	

=== Extended plays ===
List of extended plays, with selected details and certifications
Title	Studio album details	Certifications
BRB Be Right Back	Released: May 28, 2020; Label: Universal Latino, Republic; Formats: LP, cassette, digital download	RIAA: Gold (Latin)

=== Singles ===
List of singles as lead artist, with selected chart positions, certifications and album name
Title	Year	Peak chart positions										Certifications	Album
Title	Year	US Latin	US Latin Airplay	US Latin Rhythm	ARG	ITA	SPA	P.R	ECU	MEX	WW	Certifications	Album
"Pirateando"	2018	—	—	—	—	—	—	—	—	—	—		Non-album singles
"Rebota"	2018	35	33	19	44	—	72	—	—	— (Note: "Rebota" did not enter the Mexico Airplay chart, but peaked at number 43 on the Mexico Pop Español Airplay chart.)	—	RIAA: 4× Platinum (Latin)	Non-album singles
"La Stripper"	2019	—	—	—	—	—	—	—	—	—	—		Non-album singles
"Mi Leona" (with Ñejo)	2019	—	—	—	—	—	—	—	—	—	—		Non-album singles
"Machuqueo" (with Paulino Rey and Brray featuring Chris Wandell)	2019	—	—	—	—	—	—	—	—	—	—		Non-album singles
"Bugalú" (with KRZ)	2019	—	—	—	—	—	—	—	—	—	—		Non-album singles
"Tra Tra Tra (Remix)" (with Ghetto Kids featuring Mad Fuentes)	2019	—	—	—	—	—	—	—	—	—	—	RIAA: 2× Platinum (Latin)	Non-album singles
"Rebota (Remix)" (with Nicky Jam and Farruko featuring Becky G and Sech)	2019	28	—	—	18	—	24	—	—	—	—	RIAA: Platinum (Latin); PROMUSICAE: Gold	BRB Be Right Back
"Chicharrón" (featuring Cauty)	2019	—	—	—	—	—	—	—	—	—	—	RIAA: Platinum (Latin)	BRB Be Right Back
"Buyaka"	2019	—	—	—	—	—	—	—	—	—	—		BRB Be Right Back
"Dame Bien" (with Mala Rodríguez featuring Big Freedia)	2019	—	—	—	—	—	—	—	—	—	—		Non-album singles
"Plata Ta Tá" (with Mon Laferte)	2019	—	—	—	—	—	—	—	—	— (Note: "Plata Ta Tá" did not enter the Mexico Airplay chart, but peaked at number 18 on the Monitor Latino Mexico Pop Airplay chart.)	—	AMPROFON: Gold	Non-album singles
"Full Moon" (with Yandel)	2019	— (Note: "Full Moon" did not enter the Hot Latin Songs chart, but peaked at number 25 on the Latin Digital Songs chart.)	—	—	—	—	—	—	—	—	—		BRB Be Right Back
"Taxi" (with Mariah Angeliq)	2020	—	—	—	—	—	—	—	—	—	—		Non-album single
"Rompe Rodillas"	2020	—	—	25	—	—	—	—	—	—	—		BRB Be Right Back
"Perreo Intenso" (with Ankhal and Farruko featuring Kevvo)	2020	— (Note: "Perreo Intenso" did not enter the Hot Latin Songs chart, but peaked at number 19 on the Latin Digital Songs chart.)	—	—	—	—	—	—	—	—	—		Non-album singles
"Imposible Amor" (with Matisse)	2020	—	—	—	—	—	—	—	—	—	—	AMPROFON: Platinum	Non-album singles
"Acompáñame" (with Catalyna and Yandel)	2020	—	—	—	—	—	—	—	—	—	—		Non-album singles
"Mera"	2020	—	—	—	—	—	—	—	—	—	—		BRB Be Right Back
"Esta Electricidad (Es Real)" (with Camila Moreno)	2020	—	—	—	—	—	—	—	—	—	—		Non-album singles
"Agachaito" (with Young Hollywood and Sensato featuring Quimico Ultra Mega)	2020	—	—	—	—	—	—	—	—	—	—		Non-album singles
"Se Te Nota" (with Lele Pons)	2020	25	—	—	18	62	17	—	—	49	44	RIAA: 3× Platinum (Latin); AMPROFON: 2× Diamond; FIMI: Gold; PROMUSICAE: Platinum	Non-album singles
"Chama" (with Lyanno)	2020	—	—	—	—	—	—	—	—	—	—		Non-album singles
"Chica Ideal" (with Sebastián Yatra)	2020	13	1	1	8	—	10	—	—	8	74	RIAA: 4× Platinum (Latin); AMPROFON: Diamond; PROMUSICAE: 3× Platinum	Dharma
"Monterrey" (with Pain Digital)	2021	—	44	23	—	—	—	—	—	— (Note: "Monterrey" did not enter the Mexico Airplay chart, but peaked at number 22 on the Mexico Pop Español Airplay chart.)	—		La República
"Demente" (with Chungha)	2021	—	—	—	—	—	—	—	—	—	—		Querencia
"Calle" (with Lola Indigo and Cauty)	2021	—	—	—	—	—	72	—	—	—	—		La Niña
"Cumbia a la gente" (with Los Ángeles Azules)	2021	—	—	—	—	—	—	—	—	—	—		La República
"Nos Volvimos Locos" (with Gloria Trevi)	2021	—	—	—	—	—	—	9	12	—	—		Isla Divina
"Vamo' Echando" (with NIA)	2021	—	—	—	—	—	—	-	-	—	—		Non-album single
"—" denotes a recording that did not chart or was not released in that territory.

== Guest appearances ==
List of other album appearances
Title	Year	Other artist(s)	Album
"Por si las Moscas"	2021	Melendi	Likes y Cicatrices
"Tajin"	2022	Becky G	Esquemas
"Reinas"	2022	Danny Ocean	@dannocean 2
"Chi Chi"	2022	Steve Aoki	Hiroquest: Genesis
"El Caudal"	2023	Monsieur Periné	Bolero Apocalíptico
"Tu No Eres un Angel"	2024	Grupo 5 and Mike Bahía	Tu No Eres un Angel
