= Stay Tonight =

2020 single by Chung Ha

Single by Chung Ha

from the album Querencia
- Released: April 27, 2020
- Recorded: 2019–2020
- Genre: House; disco-pop
- Length: 3:37
- Label: MNH; Stone Music
- Songwriters: VINCENZO; Any Masingga; Fuxxy; Anna Timgren
- Producers: VINCENZO; Any Masingga; Fuxxy; Anna Timgren

Chung Ha singles chronology
| "Everybody Has" (2020) | "Stay Tonight" (2020) | "My Friend" (2020) |

Alternative cover
- Physical version

Music video
- "Stay Tonight (MNH)" on YouTube "Stay Tonight (Stone)" on YouTube

"Stay Tonight" is a song by South Korean singer Chung Ha as the lead single from her debut Korean-language studio album Querencia. The song was released on April 27, 2020, by MNH Entertainment and Stone Music. It was written and produced by VINCENZO, Any Masingga, Fuxxy and Anna Timgren. "Stay Tonight" is a house and disco-pop song.

An accompanying music video for the song was directed by Rima Yoon and Dongju Jang and uploaded onto Stone Music's and Chung Ha's YouTube channels simultaneously with the single's release. Commercially, the single reached the charts in three countries. In South Korea, the song debuted and peaked at number 9 on the Gaon Digital Chart, and peaked at number 4 on the Billboard World Digital Songs chart. A promotional CD was made available through special events only.

== Background and composition ==
On April 12, 2020, Chung Ha released an ad image titled "PRE-RELEASE SINGLE #1". According to the image, a photo teaser, an online cover image, and a music video teaser would be revealed on April 20–24. The image contained a dreamlike moonlight and hand-shaped sculptures that stretch toward it. On the April 21, the official cover of the single was revealed. The music video teasers were released on April 22 and 23.

"Stay Tonight" was written and produced by VINCENZO, Any Masingga, Fuxxy and Anna Timgren. It runs for three minutes and thirty-seven seconds. Stone Music said that "In the song, the house genre is diversified into sections for each section, and three-dimensional images are drawn. The harp and piano riffs enhance the fantastic atmosphere, decorate the intro, and refined bass lines and rhythms added from the bust fill the center of the song. The harsh bass sound added to the drop and chorus sections, a soulful piano, a layered synthesizer and a dense vocal lead the song to a climax steeply. The words of the song imply the theme of love".

== Critical reception and promotion ==
The song received critical acclaim from the critics. Yann from Hellpop stated in his review that the song is "completely captivated with its harp and piano riff elements. It also contained a booming bass sound in the background, serving as a perfect match to the song’s bold and intense choreography and overall aura". Edward Gibby of Regard described the song as a "disco-pop song performed with quality vocals from Kim Chung Ha". Writing for TheBiasList, Nick wrote that "Stay Tonight" "from the first verse, the song is committed to its percolating groove, beckoning you with 90’s house beats, atmospheric electronics and a subtle hint of disco guitar".

During a live stream on the V Live app, Chung Ha confirmed that she would not promote the song because it was a pre-release single.

"Stay Tonight" on year-end lists
| Critic/Publication | List | Rank | Ref. |
|---|---|---|---|
| BuzzFeed | 35 Songs That Helped Define K-Pop In 2020 | 21 | |
| Idology | 20 Songs of the Year | —N/a | |
| Rolling Stone India | 20 Best K-pop Music Videos of 2020 | 17 | |
| Hypebae | Best K-Pop Songs and Music Videos of 2020 | —N/a | |

== Commercial performance ==
The song debuted in the top eight major realtime music charts, including number one on one music chart, Genie and the top three on Soribada, Melon, Naver and Bugs. "Stay Tonight" debuted at number 9 on the Gaon Digital Chart, giving the singer her fifth top ten song. The song debuted at number 4 on the US World Digital Song Sales chart. It also became Chung Ha's first top-five entry and her third top-ten entry overall, respectively. It has also debuted at number 30 in Singapore, marking it her third appearance on the chart.

== Music video ==
The music video was released on April 27, 2020 along with the album. The music video was directed by Rima Yoon and Dongju Jang. As of June 2020, it has over 25 million views combined on Chung Ha's and Stone Music Entertainment's channels YouTube. On May 5, the dance practice video for "Stay Tonight" was released on Chung Ha's official YouTube channel.

=== Reception ===
Star Live was positive in an article about the music video, stating that "Chung Ha shows her upgraded visual, putting on gleamy makeup to match her nickname 'Goddess of Glitter.' She captivates hearts with a jaw-dropping performance with her dancers. Her dance moves are soft and dreamy yet powerful at the same time". Eward Gibby of Regard praised the "charismatic appearance of Kim Chung Ha, when dancing with male and female dancers, wearing glamorous costumes and makeup".

== Credits and personnel ==
Credits adapted from the description of the "Stay Tonight" music video.

- VINCENZO – lyrics, composition, arrangement, synthesizer, piano
- Any Masingga – lyrics, composition, arrangement, bass, drum
- Fuxxy – lyrics, composition
- Anna Timgren – lyrics, composition
- 김연서 – background vocals
- 정은경, 김지현 at Ingrid Studio – recording engineering
- 윤원권 at Studio Deep KICK – mixing engineering
- 박정언 at Honey Butter Studio – master engineering

== Accolades ==
Awards and nominations
| Year | Organization | Category | Result | Ref. |
|---|---|---|---|---|
| 2021 | 10th Gaon Chart Music Awards | Artist of the Year – Digital Music (April 2020) | Nominated | |

== Charts ==
=== Weekly charts ===
Weekly chart performance for "Stay Tonight"
| Chart (2020) | Peak position |
|---|---|
| Singapore (RIAS) | 30 |
| South Korea (Gaon) | 9 |
| South Korea (Kpop Hot 100) | 12 |
| US World Digital Song Sales (Billboard) | 4 |

=== Monthly charts ===
Monthly chart performance for "Stay Tonight"
| Chart (2020) | Peak position |
|---|---|
| South Korea (Gaon) | 32 |

=== Year-end charts ===
2020 year-end chart performance for "Stay Tonight"
| Chart (2020) | Peak position |
|---|---|
| South Korea Streaming (Gaon) | 197 |

== Release history ==
Release formats for "Stay Tonight"
| Region | Date | Format | Label | Ref. |
|---|---|---|---|---|
| Various | April 27, 2020 | CD; download; streaming | MNH; Stone Music | |
