= Changmo =

South Korean rapper and music producer (born 1994)

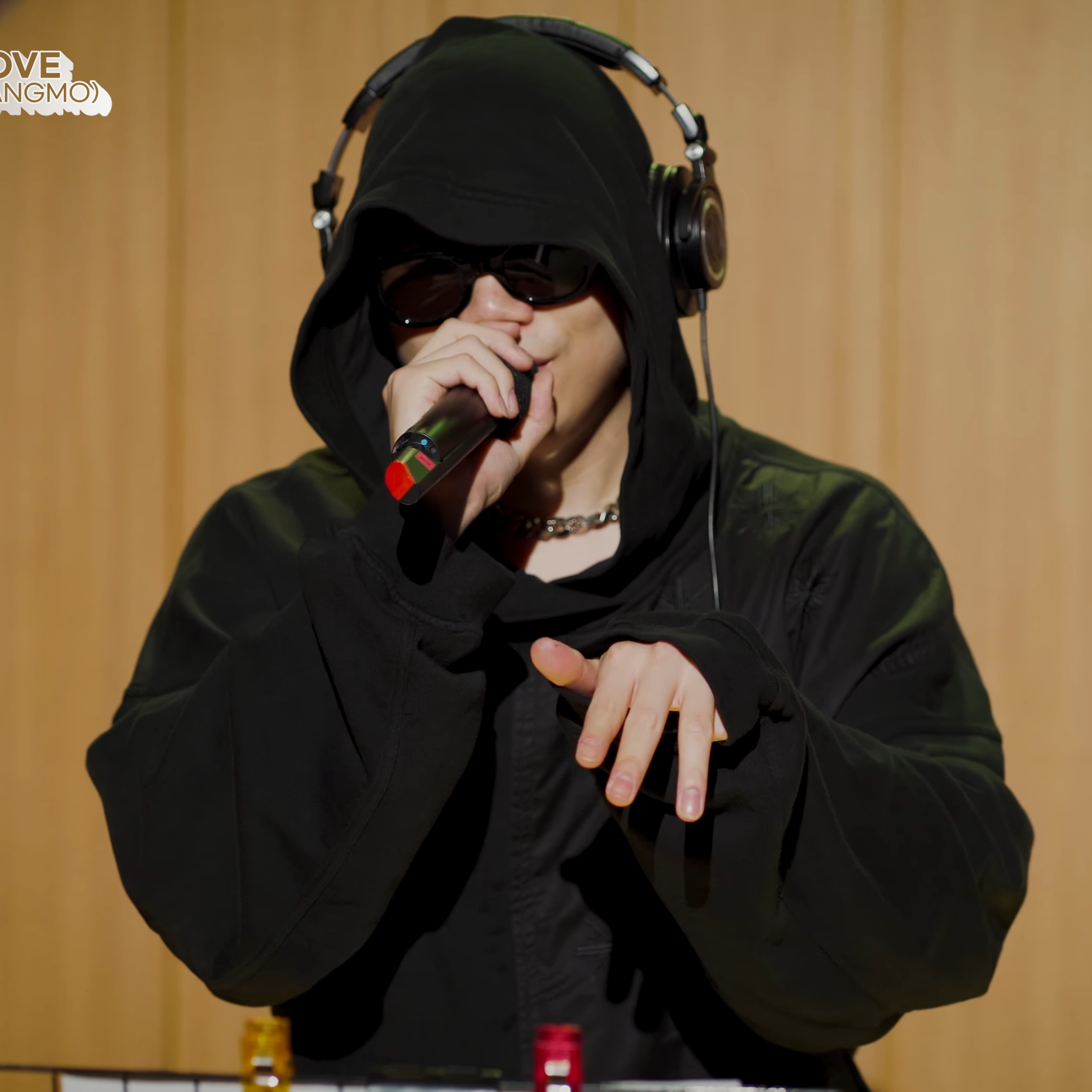
- Changmo in 2020

Background information
- Born: Ku Chang-mo; May 31, 1994 (age 32); Jeongseon, Gangwon, South Korea
- Genre: Korean hip hop
- Occupations: Rapper; music producer
- Instruments: Vocals, piano
- Years active: 2013–present
- Label: Ambition Musik
- Website: instagram.com/changmo_

Korean name
- Hangul: 구창모
- Hanja: 具昌謨
- RR: Gu Changmo
- MR: Ku Ch'angmo

Ku Chang-mo (Korean: 구창모; born May 31, 1994), known mononymously as Changmo (창모; stylized in all caps), is a South Korean rapper and music producer. He released his debut album Motown on March 18, 2016. In October 2016, he joined Dok2 and The Quiett's sub-label, Ambition Musik.

== Personal life ==
=== Education ===
Changmo was accepted into Berklee College of Music twice, having applied once when he was 18, and once when he was 19. However, as he could not obtain a scholarship on both occasions, he chose not to attend.

=== Military service ===
Changmo enlisted in the army for his mandatory military enlistment on March 14, 2022, and was discharged on September 13, 2023.

== Discography ==
=== Mixtapes ===
Title	Details
Time to Get Money (돈 벌 시간)	Released: January 7, 2014; Format: Digital download
Ready to Be a Star #DBJB (돈 벌 준비 #DBJB)	Released: October 21, 2014; Format: SoundCloud streaming

=== Studio albums ===
Title	Details	Peak chart positions	Sales
Title	Details	KOR	Sales
Boyhood	Released: November 29, 2019; Label: Ambition Musik; Formats: Digital download, streaming; Track listing: 1. Wish (빌었어); 2. Meteor; 3. We Up (위업) (feat. Okasian, Uneducated Kid); 4. 2 Minutes of Hell (feat. Paul Blanco); 5. My Hometown Seoul (나의고향서울); 6. Da Wero (더 위로); 7. Dearlove (skit); 8. Serenade (세레나데); 9. 031576; 10. Remedy (feat. Chungha); 11. Meet Me in Toronto (feat. Paul Blanco); 12. Hotel Walkerhill (feat. Hash Swan); 13. Start	13	KOR: 3,542
Underground Rockstar	Released: November 11, 2021; Label: Ambition Musik, Genie Music, Stone Music Entertainment; Formats: Digital download, streaming; Track listing: 1. "Moraesigye" (모래시계); 2. "Taiji" (태지); 3. "Rockstar Lifestyle" (feat. 365lit, Posadic); 4. "Beretta" (feat. Ahn Da-young); 5. "Chronic Love" (feat. Jibin (Y2K92)); 6. "Vivienne"; 7. "Little Brothers" (feat. Lil Gimchi); 8. "Hyperstar"; 9. "Hotel Room"; 10. "No Regret" (feat. Joe Layne); 11. "Supernova" (feat. Dut2)	26	KOR: 5,092
Monolith	Released: October 1, 2026; Label: Morient, Genie Music, Stone Music Entertainment; Formats: Digital download, streaming; Track listing: 1. "UGRS Right Here!"; 2. "Me and My Clan" (feat. Paul Blanco); 3. "Rats"; 4. "Memento Mori" (feat. Seori); 5. "Tokyo Neon"; 6. "Call Me" (불러봐; feat. Dimo Rex); 7. "Impulse"; 8. "Sangenjaya" (feat. Jeebanoff, Paul Blanco); 9. "Gospel" (가스펠); 10. "What You Know About Me?"	24	KOR: 4,294

=== Extended plays ===
Title	Details	Peak chart positions	Sales
Title	Details	KOR	Sales
Motown	Released: March 18, 2016; Label: Luminant Entertainment; Formats: Digital download; Track listing: 1. "Light Me Up"; 2. "Party"; 3. "Mine" (내꺼); 4. "Get Money" (돈 벌어); 5. "W A N G"; 6. "Nobody"; 7. "Same Girls" (여자는 같애)	—	—N/a
Time to Earn Money 2 (돈 벌 시간 2)	Released: July 21, 2016; Label: Luminant Entertainment; Formats: CD, digital download; Track listing: 1. "Money Made Me Do It" (돈이 하게 했어); 2. "D.O.N"; 3. "Sanai" (사나이) (feat. Don Mills); 4. "Maestro" (마에스트로); 5. "Beautiful" (아름다워); 6. "Mosart"	50	KOR: 506+
Time to Earn Money 3 (돈 벌 시간 3)	Released: December 15, 2016; Label: Ambition Musik, CJ E&M; Formats: CD, digital download; Track listing: 1. "Ambition" (feat. Hash Swan & Keem Hyo-eun); 2. "Rockstar"; 3. "Ah Yee Ya" (아이야) (feat. Beenzino); 4. "My Mate" (feat. MyunDo); 5. "Bling!"; 6. "Jagger"	49	KOR: 510
Gettin Money Moment (돈 번 순간)	Released: May 24, 2017; Label: Ambition Musik, CJ E&M; Formats: Digital download; Track listing: 1. "Inkigayo" (인기가요) (feat. The Quiett & Dok2); 2. "One More Rollie" (feat. Keem Hyo-eun & Hash Swan); 3. "Show Me Love" (feat. Sik-K); 4. "Two Face"; 5. "Five"; 6. "Bape"; 7. "High with Me"; 8. "Wait for Me"	26	KOR: 880
Reached Moment (DNSG) (닿는 순간)	Released: June 11, 2018; Label: Ambition Musik, CJ E&M; Formats: Digital download; Track listing: 1. "Intro"; 2. "Lilac" (라일락) (feat. Choi Jung-hoon of Jannabi); 3. "Touch" (닿게 됐어); 4. "Hood Boyz" (동네 놈들) (feat. Paul Blanco); 5. "Holy God"; 6. "Selfmade Orange" (feat. Superbee); 7. "Interlude"; 8. "Can't You See I'm a Rockstar?" (feat. Paul Blanco); 9. "Pingye" (핑계)	38	—N/a
Wonderful Days	Released: January 31, 2024; Label: Ambition Musik, CJ E&M; Formats: Digital download; Track listing: 1. "Pure Rage" (feat. Street Baby, Kor Kash); 2. "Heliot Emil"; 3. "FWB"; 4. "Too Hard to Find Real Love"; 5. "You're The Only One	—	—N/a
"—" denotes releases that did not chart.

=== Singles ===
Title	Year	Peak chart positions	Sales	Certifications	Album
Title	Year	KOR	Sales	Certifications	Album
As lead artist
"Gangster" (feat. Livii)	2014	—	—N/a	—N/a	Non-album single
"WANG"	2016	—	—N/a	—N/a	MOTOWN
"Cigarette" (담배)	2016	—	—N/a	—N/a	Non-album single
"Maestro" (마에스트로)	2016	42	KOR: 464,072	—N/a	Time to Earn Money 2
"Rockstar"	2016	—	—N/a	—N/a	Time to Earn Money 3
"Bling!"	2016	—	—N/a	—N/a	Time to Earn Money 3
"One More Rollie" (feat. Keem Hyo-eun & Hash Swan)	2017	—	KOR: 20,235	—N/a	Gettin Money Moment
"Inkigayo" (인기가요) (feat. The Quiett & Dok2)	2017	87	KOR: 26,960	—N/a	Gettin Money Moment
"Holy God"	2018	—	—N/a	—N/a	Reached Moment (DNSG)
"Meteor"	2019	1	—N/a	KCMA: 2× Platinum (Note: "Meteor" was certified platinum for 100 million streaming on June 11, 2020, and double platinum for 200 million streaming on September 9, 2021.)	Boyhood
"Da Wero" (더 위로)	2019	—	—N/a	—N/a	Boyhood
"Remedy" (feat. Chungha)	2019	136	—N/a	—N/a	Boyhood
"Countin My Guap"	2020	91	—N/a	—N/a	Bipolar
"Swoosh Flow"	2020	177	—N/a	—N/a	Bipolar
"GJD" (광장동에서)	2020	73	—N/a	—N/a	GJD
"Moraesigye" (모래시계)	2021	159	—N/a	—N/a	Underground Rockstar
"Taiji" (태지)	2021	—	—N/a	—N/a	Underground Rockstar
"Hyperstar"	2021	168	—N/a	—N/a	Underground Rockstar
"Just the Two of Us" (이렇게 둘이)	2022	104	—N/a	—N/a	Non-album single
"FWB"	2024	200	—N/a	—N/a	Wonderful Days
Collaborations
"Blue Moon" (with Hyolyn)	2017	3	KOR: 1,187,874	—N/a	Non-album singles
"Beer" (비워) (with Hash Swan, Ash Island, Keem Hyo-eun, Leellamarz & The Quiett)	2019	43	—N/a	—N/a	Non-album singles
"Band" (with Hash Swan, Ash Island & Keem Hyo-eun)	2019	30	—N/a	—N/a	Non-album singles
"Pay Day" (with Ash Island, Junggigo & KozyPop, prod. Gray)	2020	90	—N/a	—N/a	Non-album singles
As featured artist
"I Came to Hustle" (돈 벌러왔어) (Marvel.J feat. Changmo)	2015	—	—N/a	—N/a	Graduation
"Forgive Me" (Marvel.J feat. Changmo & Don Mills)	2017	—	—N/a	—N/a	Graduation
"Are You with Me?" (있으면돼) (So Ji-sub feat. Changmo)	2017	—	—N/a	—N/a	Non-album single
"Ambition and Vision" (Dok2 feat. Beenzino, Changmo, Keem Hyo-eun, Hash Swan & The Quiett)	2017	100	KOR: 18,606	—N/a	Reborn
"Wine" (오늘 취하면) (Suran feat. Changmo, prod. Suga)	2017	2	KOR: 2,500,000	—N/a	Walkin'
"Too Cold" (Primeboi feat. Changmo, Huckleberry P, Justhis & Jay Moon)	2017	—	—N/a	—N/a	Trailer
"Money on the Floor" (The Quiett feat. Don Mills & Changmo)	2017	—	—N/a	—N/a	Millionaire Poetry
"La La La" (Keem Hyo-eun feat. Changmo)	2017	—	—N/a	—N/a	Non-album single
"Blame" (탓) (NakJoon feat. Changmo)	2017	—	—N/a	—N/a	Non-album single
"SaimSaim" (사임사임) (Coogie, Superbee & D.Ark feat. Changmo)	2018	7	—N/a	—N/a	Show Me the Money 777
"Hundred Million" (억) (Superbee feat. Changmo)	2018	31	—N/a	—N/a	Show Me the Money 777
"Selfmade Orange 2" (Superbee feat. Changmo & Paul Blanco)	2020	—	—N/a	—N/a	Rap Legend 2
"Yours" (Raiden x Chanyeol feat. Lee Hi and Changmo)	2020	49	—N/a	—N/a	Non-album single
"Play" (Chungha feat. Changmo)	2020	14	—N/a	—N/a	Play
"Backpack" (D.ark, Trade L, Young Chens & Baegie feat. Changmo, prod. Way Ched)	2021	128	—N/a	—N/a	High School Rapper 4
"RSVP" (Hyuna feat. Changmo)	2024	—	—N/a	—N/a	Attitude
Soundtrack appearances
"Put It Down" (Dok2 feat. Keem Hyo-eun & Changmo)	2016	—	—N/a	—N/a	Entourage OST
"I'm All Ears" (내 귀는 열려)	2017	—	—N/a	—N/a	Voice OST
"I Always"	2017	—	—N/a	—N/a	Hit the Top OST
"—" denotes releases that did not chart.

=== Other charted songs ===
Title	Year	Peak chart positions	Sales	Album
Title	Year	KOR	Sales	Album
"Beautiful" (아름다워)	2016	29	KOR: 2,500,000	Time to Earn Money 2
"Selfmade Orange" (feat. Superbee)	2018	177	—N/a	Reached Moment (DNSG)
"Wish" (빌었어)	2019	14	—N/a	Boyhood

== Awards and nominations ==
Award ceremony	Year	Category	Nominee/Work	Result	Ref.
Gaon Chart Music Awards	2017	Discovery of the Year - Hip hop	Changmo	Won	
Golden Disc Awards	2020	Best R&B/Hip-Hop Award	"Meteor"	Won	
Korean Hip-Hop Awards	2020	Artist of the Year	Changmo	Nominated	
Korean Hip-Hop Awards	2020	Hip-hop Album of the Year	Boyhood	Nominated	
Korean Hip-Hop Awards	2020	Hip-hop Track of the Year	"Meteor"	Won	
Korean Hip-Hop Awards	2020	Music Video of the Year	"Meteor"	Nominated	
Korean Hip-Hop Awards	2021	Collaboration of the Year	"Swoosh Flow Remix"	Nominated	
Korean Hip-Hop Awards	2022	Artist of the Year	Changmo	Won	
Korean Hip-Hop Awards	2022	Hip-Hop Album of the Year	Underground Rockstar	Won	
Korean Hip-Hop Awards	2022	Hip-Hop Track of the Year	"Hyperstar"	Nominated	
Korean Hip-Hop Awards	2022	Hip-Hop Track of the Year	"Taiji"	Won	
Korean Hip-Hop Awards	2022	Music Video of the Year	"Taiji"	Won	
Korean Music Awards	2022	Best Rap & Hip-Hop Album	Underground Rockstar	Nominated	
Korean Music Awards	2022	Best Rap & Hip-Hop Song	"Taiji"	Won	
