= Chung Ha =

South Korean singer (born 1996)

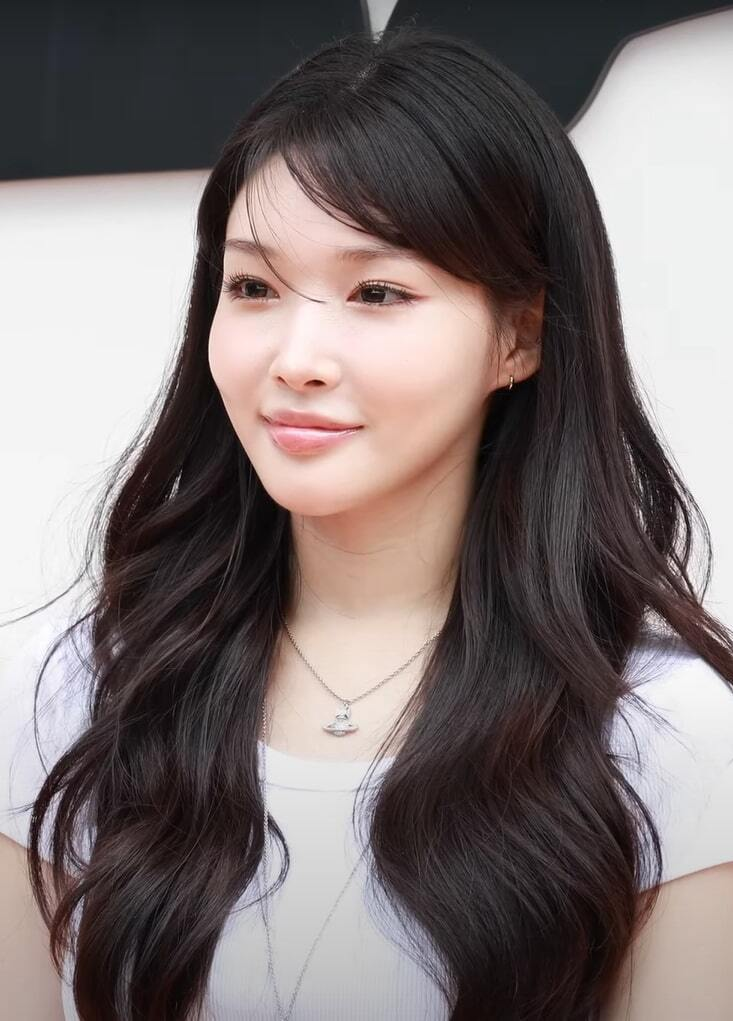
- Chung Ha in 2025
- Born: Kim Chan-mi; February 9, 1996 (age 30); Seoul, South Korea
- Other names: Kim Chung-ha; Annie Kim
- Education: Sejong University
- Occupations: Singer; dancer; choreographer
- Awards: Full list
- Musical career
- Genres: K-pop; dance pop
- Instrument: Vocals
- Years active: 2016–present
- Labels: MNH; YMC (Note: As a member of I.O.I only.); Swing; Studio Blu; More Vision; ICM Partners; 88rising
- Formerly of: I.O.I; I.O.I sub-unit; Station Young
- Website: chungha-official.com

Korean name
- Hangul: 김청하
- Hanja: 金請夏
- RR: Gim Cheongha
- MR: Kim Ch'ŏngha

Birth name
- Hangul: 김찬미
- Hanja: 金燦美
- RR: Gim Chanmi
- MR: Kim Ch'anmi

Kim Chung-ha (Korean: 김청하; born Kim Chan-mi, February 9, 1996), known mononymously as Chung Ha (stylized in all caps), is a South Korean singer, dancer and choreographer. She finished fourth in Mnet's girl group survival show Produce 101, becoming a member of the resulting girl group I.O.I. Following the dissolution of I.O.I in 2017, Chung Ha debuted as a solo artist with the extended play Hands on Me.

== Early life and education ==
Chung Ha was born as Kim Chan-mi (김찬미) on February 9, 1996, in Seoul. Known by her English name Annie Kim, she lived in Dallas, Texas, for eight years before returning to South Korea to become a singer. As a result, she speaks both English and Korean. She graduated from Sejong University, majoring in dance. She auditioned for YG Entertainment and was a JYP Entertainment trainee prior to joining MNH Entertainment. Kim trained for three years before debuting, and had been dancing for 6–7 years. She revealed that she almost quit attending dance classes at some point due to financial issues.

== Career ==
=== 2016–2017: Produce 101, I.O.I, and solo debut with Hands on Me ===
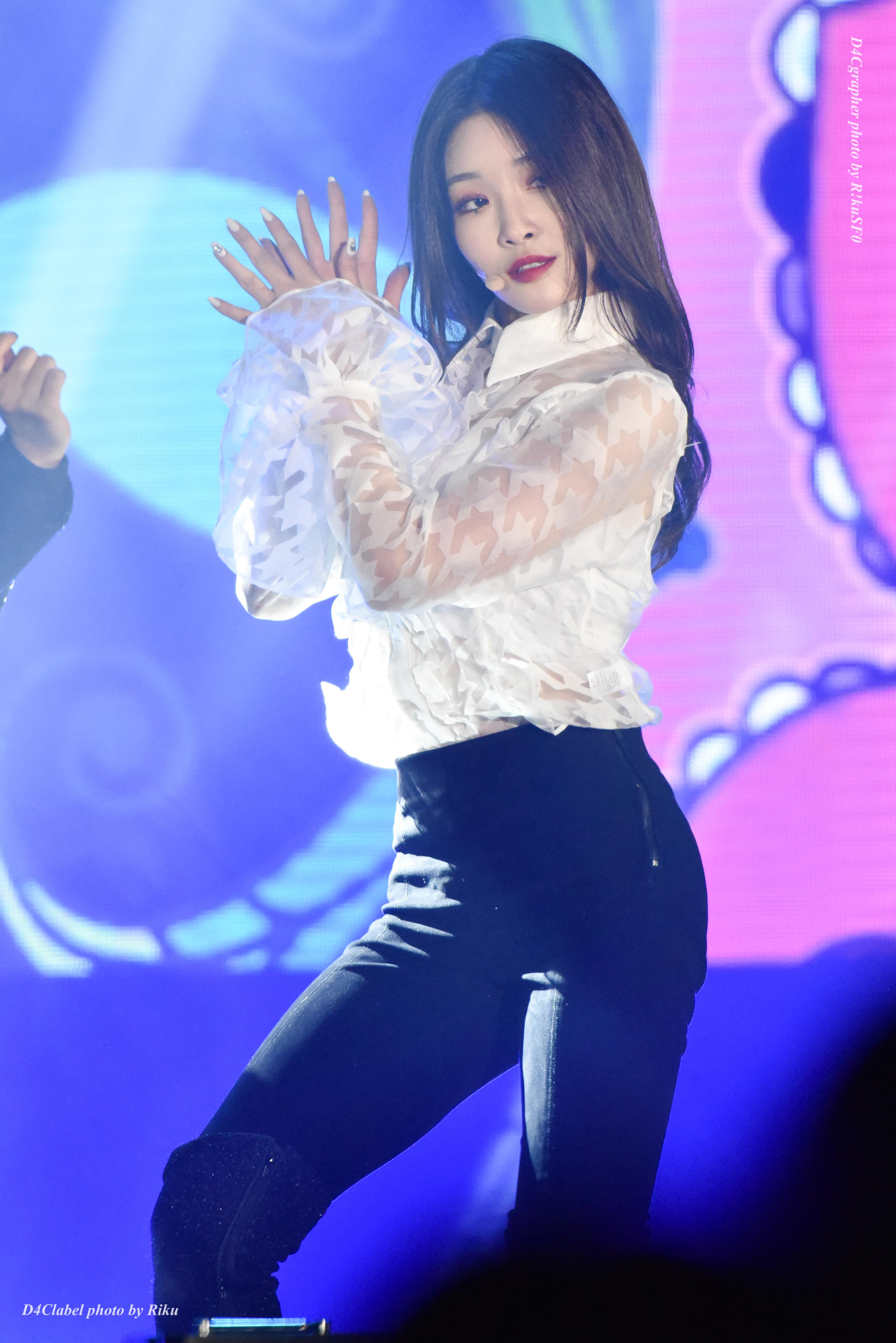
Chung Ha performing during the 2018 Winter Paralympics torch relay, on March 3, 2018

From January 22 to April 1, Kim represented MNH Entertainment on reality girl group survival show Produce 101. She finished in fourth place and debuted on May 4, with the project girl group I.O.I with the mini-album Chrysalis. On June 10, YMC Entertainment revealed Chung Ha as one of the seven members of the group's unit group, slated to promote their second single, "Whatta Man", during the summer of 2016. It was revealed that three teams were contacted to make the choreography for the single, but hers was chosen because it was deemed to be the highest quality. The single was a commercial success peaking at number 2 on the Gaon Digital Chart and on the Gaon Album Chart, for its digital (downloads and streaming) and physical sales respectively.

On June 30, it was revealed that Chung Ha would be having a cameo appearance on Korean drama, Entourage, along with groupmate Lim Na-young. On July 24, she was revealed to be a new cast member on dance survival show, Hit The Stage. On August 17, it was announced that Chungha would be collaborating with groupmates Choi Yoo-jung, Jeon So-mi, and DIA's Ki Hui-hyeon for the digital single, "Flower, Wind and You", which was produced by Boi B. The music video was released on MBK Entertainment's YouTube channel. On December 21, MNH Entertainment confirmed that she would be debuting as a solo artist in the beginning of 2017 after wrapping up I.O.I's promotions. On December 23, Chung Ha collaborated with Heo Jung-eun and HALO's Ooon for the holiday carol, "Snow in This Year", that was featured on the Korean drama, My Fair Lady.

On January 10, 2017, Chung Ha was selected to be a host for EBS' Ah! Sunday – A Running Miracle. Chung Ha would show the public how to improve their physical fitness via jogging and would take a team of challengers under her wing for the show. On April 21, she released her pre-debut single titled "Week", on the official M&H Entertainment YouTube account, followed on June 7 by her debut EP, entitled Hands on Me, with the lead track "Why Don't You Know". Chung Ha subsequently featured in Samuel Kim's solo debut album entitled Sixteen with the track "With U", and in Babylon's single, "La La La". From September 3 onwards, she took over Kisum as a DJ for EBS's radio program Listen, and on September 19, it was announced that she would be an MC for FashionN's Please Take Care of My Vanity alongside Super Junior's Leeteuk and Han Chae-young. On November 22, the first episode of her own reality show, Chung Ha's Free Month, was released on YouTube and NaverTV.

=== 2018–2019: Offset, Blooming Blue, Gotta Go, and Flourishing ===
Chung Ha released her second extended play Offset on January 17, 2018. The EP contains five tracks including the title track "Roller Coaster". On June 26, MNH Entertainment confirmed that she would be having a comeback on July 18 with her third mini-album titled Blooming Blue, with "Love U" serving as the lead single. Chung Ha became the ambassador for the Seoul International Architecture Film Festival in October of the same year. It was announced on August 8 that she would join the project group consisting of Red Velvet's Seulgi, (G)I-dle's Soyeon and GFriend's SinB called Station Young for SM Entertainment's project album SM Station X 0. They released their single, "Wow Thing" on September 28. Chung Ha collaborated with Super Junior's Yesung with the song, "Whatcha Doin'", with the music video released on December 16.

On January 2, 2019, she released her single album, Gotta Go. On January 9, Chung Ha won her first-ever music program trophy on the MBC Music's Show Champion. She was featured in VIXX member Ravi's new single, "Live", which was released on February 18, 2019. Chung Ha released her fourth EP Flourishing on June 24, 2019, alongside the music video of the lead single, "Snapping". "Snapping" was placed first on Show Champion on July 3, 2019. In August, she joined the soundtrack lineup for the tvN drama Hotel del Luna. The track, titled "At the End", was released on August 3, 2019. Chung Ha collaborated with Grizzly on the single "Run", released on August 22, and with Mommy Son on the single "Fast", released in September for the JTBC Seoul Marathon. In October 2019, Chung Ha collaborated with Indonesian rapper Rich Brian on the single "These Nights". The track serves as the single for 88rising's second compilation album, Head in the Clouds II. Chung Ha was featured in rapper Changmo's "Remedy" for his album Boyhood, released on December 25, 2019. For her accomplishments in 2019, Chung Ha was awarded the Producer of the Year and Hot Performance Award of the Year with "Gotta Go" at the 2019 Gaon Chart Music Awards. On December 12, 2019, Billboard published their list of the "25 Best K-pop Songs of the 2019", with Chung Ha's single "Gotta Go" ranked at number three. Billboard described the latter as "Chungha fully embracing her stronger, more confident side; a side that's stayed consistent throughout her major year and can help guide her to even greater heights in the new decade". The single was also ranked hundredth on Billboard's "The 100 Greatest K-Pop Songs of the 2010s".

=== 2020–2022: Promotion in the United States, Querencia, and Bare & Rare ===
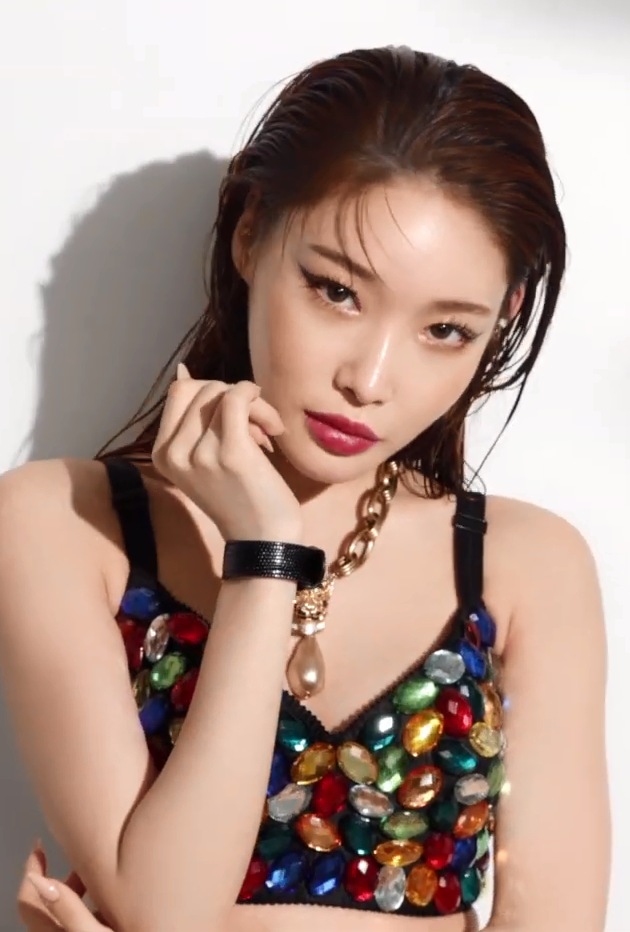
Chung Ha for Marie Claire Korea in 2020

In January 2020, Chungha collaborated with Paul Kim on the single "Loveship", which was released on January 21, 2020. She was part of the soundtrack lineup for the SBS drama Dr. Romantic 2 with the track "My Love", released on February 4, 2020. Chung Ha made her first comeback in 2020 with a new single, "Everybody Has" on February 29 as part of MNH Entertainment's New.wav project. On March 10, MNH Entertainment announced that Chung Ha had signed with American agency, ICM Partners, for her America and global promotions.

In April, Chung Ha collaborated on the pop song "Lie" with TVXQ singer Max Changmin. The song was featured on Changmin's debut extended play Chocolate and talks about the emotions exchanged between lovers who feel love in different intensities. On April 27, "Stay Tonight" was released as a pre-release single from the singer's upcoming album. The song debuted and peaked at number 9 on the Gaon Digital Chart, and peaked at number 4 on the Billboard World Digital Songs chart.

Chung Ha released the single "My Friend", which features ph-1 and produced by Zion.T on May 30, 2020. She then collaborated with Sprite on the promotional single "Be Yourself" on June 9, 2020. The single was also part of MNH's New.wav project. On July 6, Chung Ha released her second pre-released single, "Play". The maxi single which consists of the two pre-released singles, peaked at number 7 on the Gaon Album Chart with 12,613 sales. It was announced that Chung Ha would be a cast member in Law of the Jungle in Wild Korea, the first domestic filming in the programme history due to the COVID-19 pandemic.

Chung Ha made a soundtrack appearance for the tvN drama Record of Youth with the track "You're In My Soul", released on September 14, 2020. She then collaborated with Danish singer, Christopher on the single, "Bad Boy". The live version was released on September 23 while the music video was released on September 25. Chung Ha signed with 88rising in November 2020. She then collaborated with R3hab on the single "Dream of You" released on November 27, 2020.

On December 7, it was confirmed that Chung Ha had tested positive for COVID-19. All her activities were temporarily halted and she was in self-isolation. She also missed the live press conference for the new show Running Girls, but made appearance as her parts were shown in the premiere. On December 21, it was confirmed that Chung Ha was an asymptomatic carrier, and had left quarantine after 10 days and was resting at home since December 18. Chung Ha was set to release her first full-length album Querencia on January 4, 2021, but the release of the album was delayed to February 15, 2021. The title track "Bicycle" with the music video was released on the same day. Chung Ha was featured on Rain's "Why Don't We", which is the title track for his third EP Pieces by Rain. The EP and the music video was released on March 3, 2021. Chung Ha and the members of I.O.I celebrated their 5th debut anniversary with a reunion live stream show called "Yes, I love it!" on May 4, 2021.

On June 8, 2021, Chung Ha collaborated with Colde on the single "My Lips Like Warm Coffee". She then participated in the soundtrack of One the Woman with the single "Someday". In October 2021, Chung Ha made a special collaboration with the dance crew LACHICA on the single "Bad Girl" for the Street Woman Fighter Special. On November 29, 2021, Chung Ha released the special single "Killing Me".

On July 11, 2022, Chung Ha released the first part of her second full-length album Bare & Rare with its lead single "Sparkling".

=== 2023–present: Label changes and Eenie Meenie ===
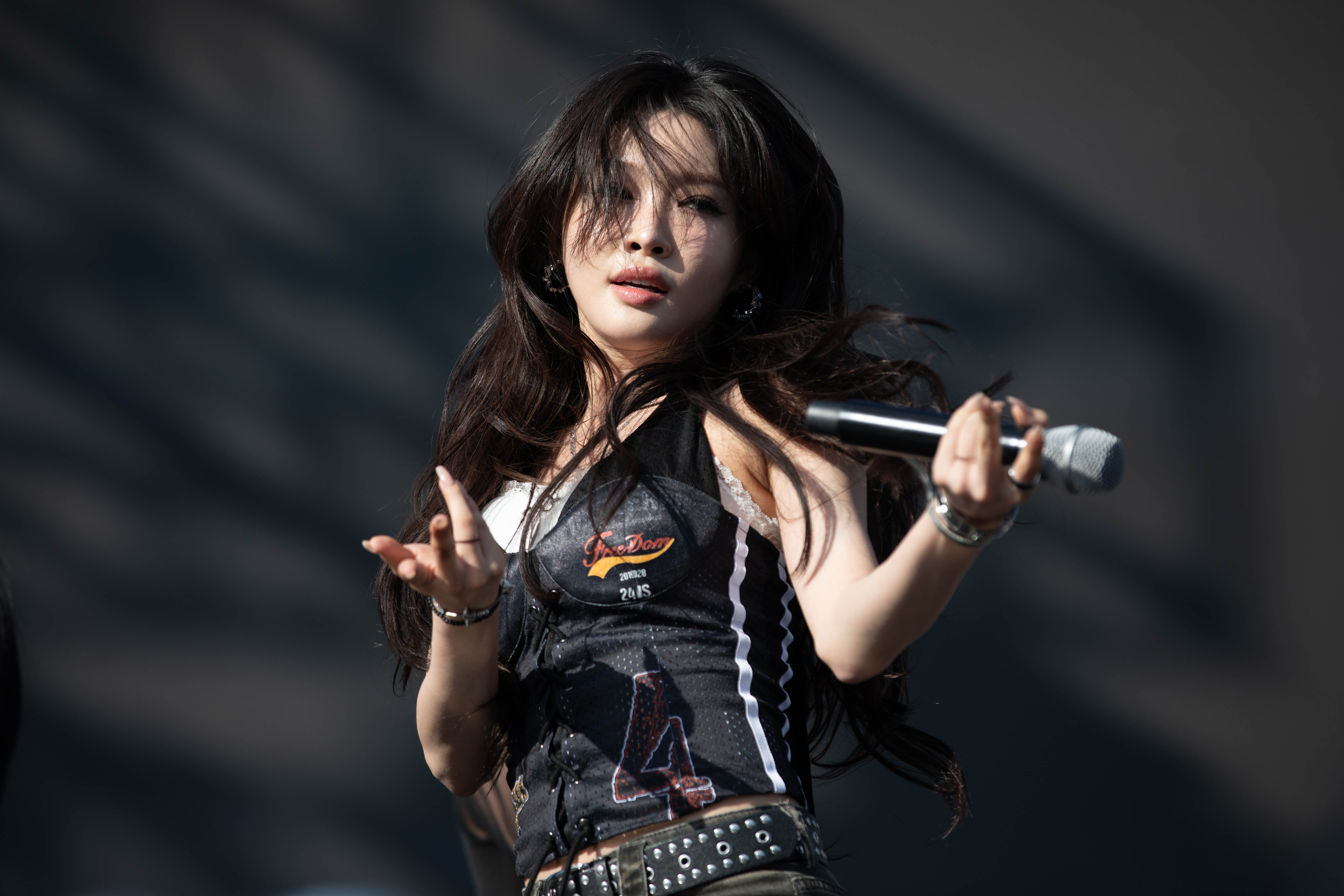
Chung Ha performing at the Ground Forces Festival in 2025

In January 2023, the agency confirmed that Chung Ha had decided not to renew her contract which will end in March. On April 29, 2023, Chung Ha's contract with MNH Entertainment expired. On October 10, 2023, it was announced that Chung Ha signed with Jay Park's label More Vision.

On March 11, 2024, Chung Ha released her first digital single album Eenie Meenie, led by the single "Eenie Meenie" featuring South Korean rapper Hongjoong of Ateez. The single album also features the B-side "I'm Ready", for which Chung Ha released a dance performance video.

On August 28, Chung Ha released the digital single "Algorithm", alongside a "Y2K-inspired" music video.

On February 12, 2025, Chung Ha came back with the single "Stress", released alongside her fifth mini album Alivio, which consisted of eight tracks including a duet with fellow K-pop soloist Sunmi. On December 5, she released her special Christmas digital single Christmas Promises: Again.

On February 9, 2026, Chung Ha released the single, "Save Me". On September 1, she released the digital single "Mexico".

== Influences ==
Chung Ha has stated singer-songwriter IU is her role model as she admires the way the soloist is able to sing, dance, and perform various other things. She has also stated that some of her role models are soloists BoA and Lee Hyori, as well as girl group 2NE1.

== Endorsements and promotions ==
Chung Ha posing for a photoshoot for SharkNinja in 2025

Chung Ha has endorsed various products ranging from electronics to clothing and cosmetics. Her first endorsement was for Nike's "Nike x W Korea", alongside singer Amber Liu and dancer May J Lee in 2017.

Chung Ha's endorsements includes modeling for Umbro, women's clothing brand Muzak Ifne, Lens Town's contact lenses, endorsing Lotte Chilsung's 'Chungha', and being the brand model for Guljak Topokki Chicken restaurant. She has also endorsed the video games Sudden Attack and Bosslave, and LG Corporation's mobile service U+ 5G. In March 2019, Clinique announced that they had worked with and chosen Chung Ha as the brand's global ambassador. In May 2019, Sprite Korea announced her as the new model and face of the brand and their Summer 2019 "Dive in Sprite" campaign alongside actor Jang Ki-yong. In April 2020, Chung Ha officially joined the Dolce & Gabbana Beauty family.

== Philanthropy ==
On October 12, 2021, Chung Ha was announced as a member of the Green Noble Club. The club is made of large donors who've made donations of ₩100 million or more to the Green Umbrella Children's Foundation.

On February 9, 2023, Chung Ha donated ₩50 million to support low-income families' medical expenses on her 27th birthday through the Green Umbrella Children's Foundation.

On February 10, 2020, Chungha donated 10,000 masks for children from low-income families on her birthday.

== Discography ==
- Querencia (2021)
- Bare & Rare (2022)

== Filmography ==
=== Television series ===
Year	Title	Role	Notes	Ref.
2016	Entourage	Herself	Episode 1 with Lim Na-young	
2017	Idol Drama Operation Team	Herself	Episode 5–6	
2018	YG Future Strategy Office	Herself	Episode 4	
2018	Top Management	Herself	Episode 14	

=== Television shows ===
Year	Title	Role	Notes	Ref.
2016	Produce 101	Contestant	Survival show that determined I.O.I members Finished 4th	
2016	Hit the Stage	Contestant	Episode 3–4 and 10	
2017	Ah! Sunday – A Running Miracle	Host		
2017	King of Mask Singer	Contestant (Flower Shrimp)	Episode 127	
2017	Please Take Care of My Vanity	Host		
2017	Chungha's Free Month		Documentary	
2018	Real Life Men and Women	Cast member		
2018	The Call	Cast member		
2020	Law of the Jungle in Wild Korea	Cast member		
2020	Running Girls	Cast member		

=== Radio shows ===
Year	Title	Notes	Ref.
2017–2019	Listen	DJ	
2022	Noon's Hope Song, Kim Shin-young	Special DJ	
2023	Volume Up	DJ	
