= List of Inkigayo Chart winners (2019) =

Inkigayo Chart winners (2019)

Highlights
- Artist(s) with most wins: Itzy (5)
- Song with highest score: "Boy with Luv" by BTS (11,000)

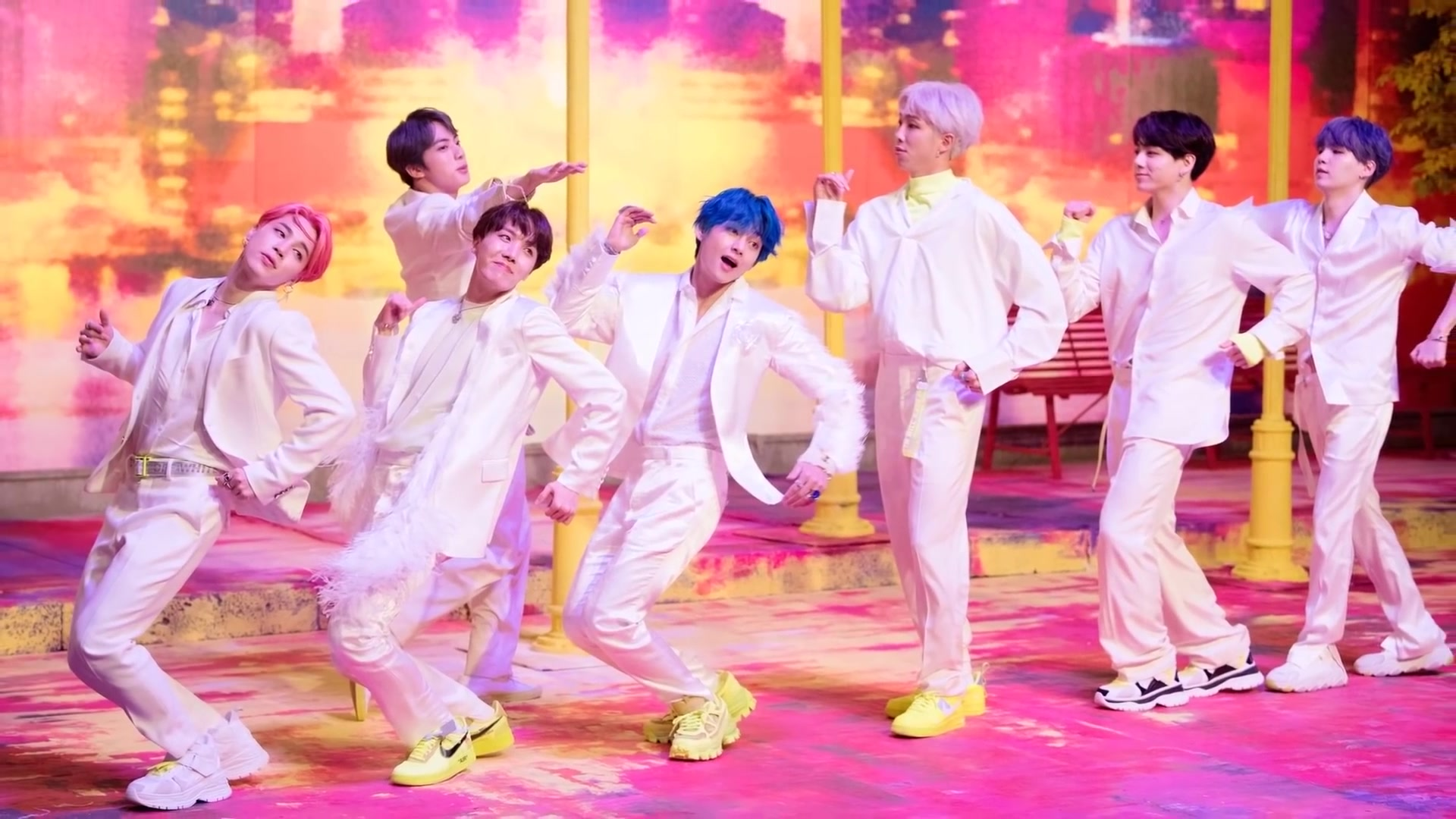
"Boy with Luv" accumulated 11,000 points on the April 28 broadcast, earning boy group BTS the highest score of 2019. They also achieved a Triple Crown.

The Inkigayo Chart is a music program record chart on Seoul Broadcasting System (SBS) that gives an award to the best-performing single of the week in South Korea. The chart measured digital performance in domestic online music services (5,500 points), social media via YouTube views (3,500 points), network on-air time (1,000 points), advanced viewer votes (500 points), and album sales (500 points) in its ranking methodology throughout January 2019. Beginning on February 3, Inkigayo implemented modifications to its measurements of albums (up to 1,000 points) and social media (down to 3,000 points). Songs that spend three weeks at number one are awarded a Triple Crown and are removed from the chart and ineligible to win again. Seventeen member Mingyu and DIA member Jung Chae-yeon had hosted the show together since November 11, 2018. Chae-yeon was replaced by actress Shin Eun-soo starting with the February 17 broadcast. Mingyu and Eun-soo continued to host the show together till October 6, when they were replaced by Monsta X member Lee Min-hyuk, NCT member Jaehyun and April member Lee Na-eun.

In 2019, 36 singles ranked number one on the chart and 28 music acts received award trophies for this feat. Four songs collected trophies for three weeks and earned a Triple Crown: Itzy's "Dalla Dalla", BTS's "Boy with Luv", IU's "Blueming", and Mamamoo's "Hip". BTS accumulated a perfect score on the April 28 broadcast of Inkigayo with "Boy with Luv" when the song scored 11,000 points. Eight artists ranked more than one single at number one in 2019. The chart began the year with "Millions" by Winner retaining the top spot from the final chart of 2018. The following week, former I.O.I member Chungha ranked number one on the chart for the first time with her single "Gotta Go". She went on to achieve her second number one single on the July 7 broadcast with "Snapping". Two other soloists had more than one number one single in 2019: Taeyeon, with "Four Seasons" and "Spark", and IU, with "Love Poem" and "Blueming". The latter of these went on to attain a triple crown in December. Girl group Itzy had their first ever number one on the chart with their debut single "Dalla Dalla". Their next single "Icy" went on to rank number one for two weeks in August. Both singles spent a total of 5 weeks atop the chart, making Itzy the act with the most weeks at number one in 2019. In attaining their third win with "Hip", Mamamoo collected their second Triple Crown on the television series. They had previously accomplished the distinction the previous year with "Starry Night". Their single "Gogobebe" also ranked number one on the March 31 broadcast. The other artists to rank more than one single at number one were GFriend with "Sunrise" and "Fever", Twice with "Fancy" and "Feel Special", and Red Velvet with "Zimzalabim" and "Umpah Umpah".

Besides Chungha and Itzy, eight other artists achieved their first Inkigayo award in 2019. Oh My Girl won their first music award on a public broadcasting network with "Bungee" on SBS. It marked the record among girl groups for the longest span between their debut and the achievement at 1,581 days. Woody's "Fire Up" and Kim Na-young's "To Be Honest" claimed the soloists their first wins on the program. X1, formed through the fourth season of Produce 101, gained their first number one on the chart with their debut single "Flash" on September 8. The group went on to disband in January 2023 due to the Mnet vote manipulation investigation. Boy group N.Flying achieved their first ever Inkigayo award on March 17 for their single "Rooftop". Other first-time number ones on the chart include Seventeen with "Home" in February and NU'EST with "Love Me" in November.

== Chart history ==
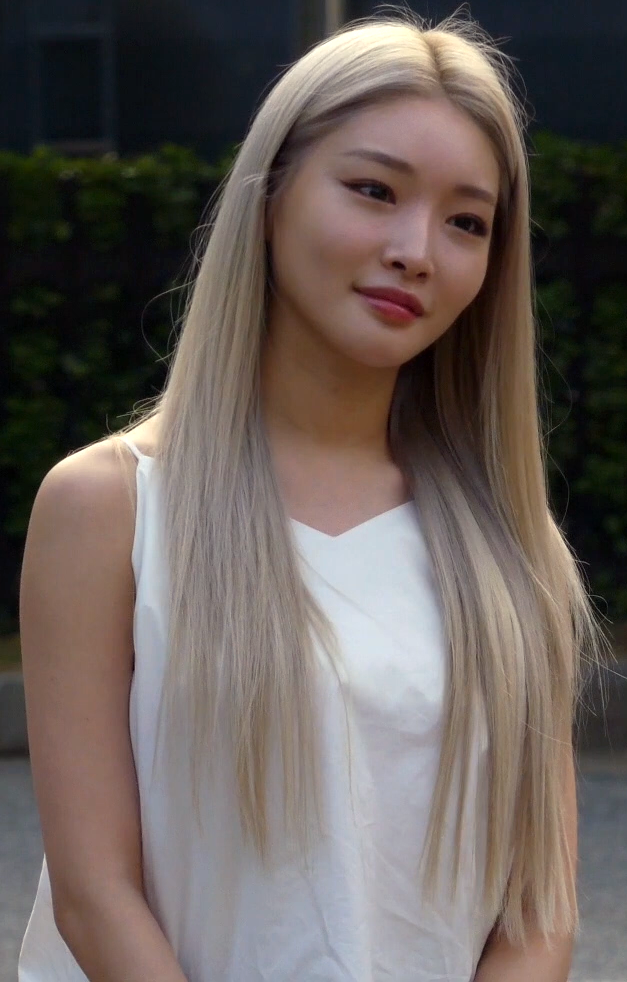
Singer Chungha earned her first Inkigayo award with "Gotta Go".

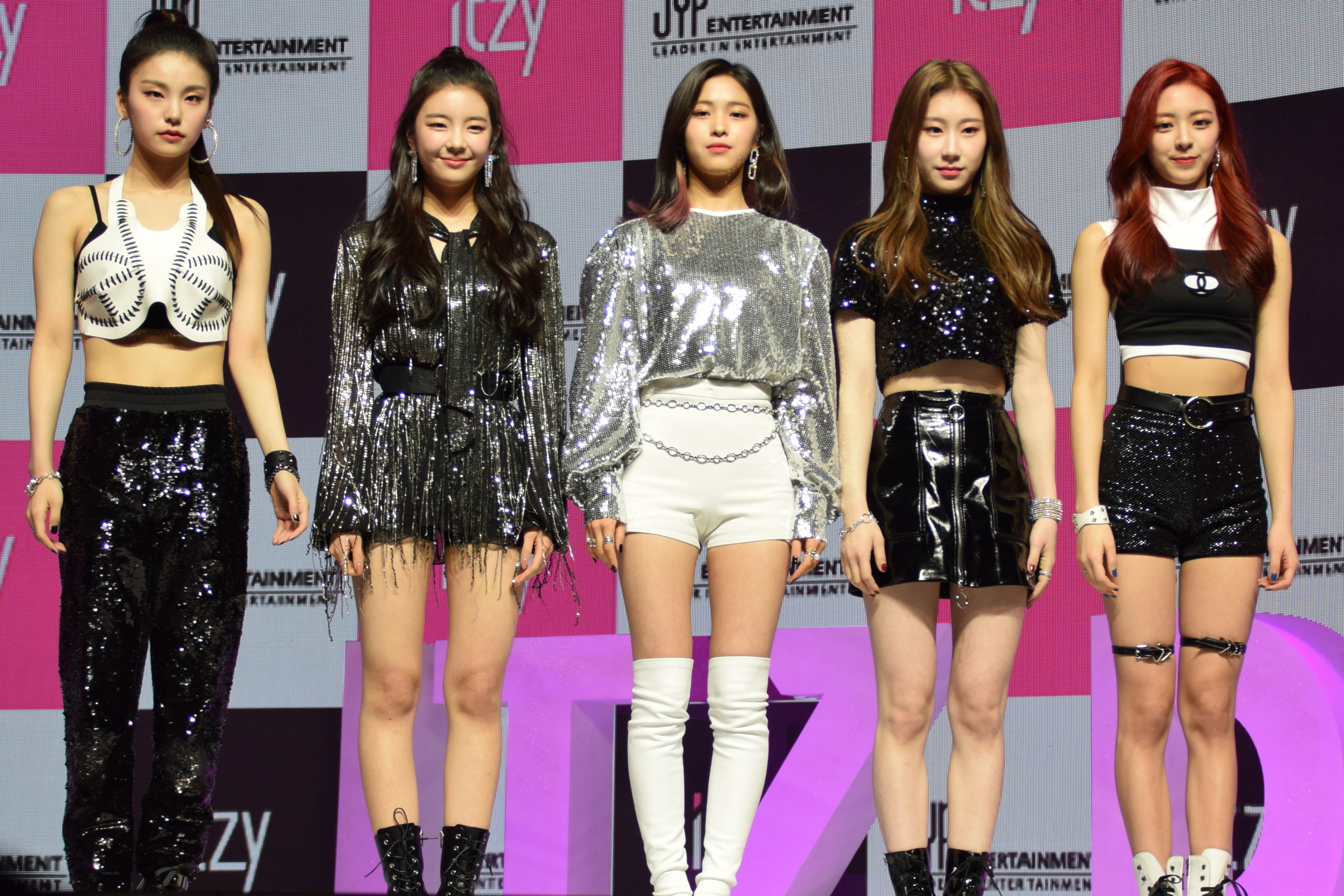
Girl group Itzy achieved a Triple Crown with their debut single "Dalla Dalla".

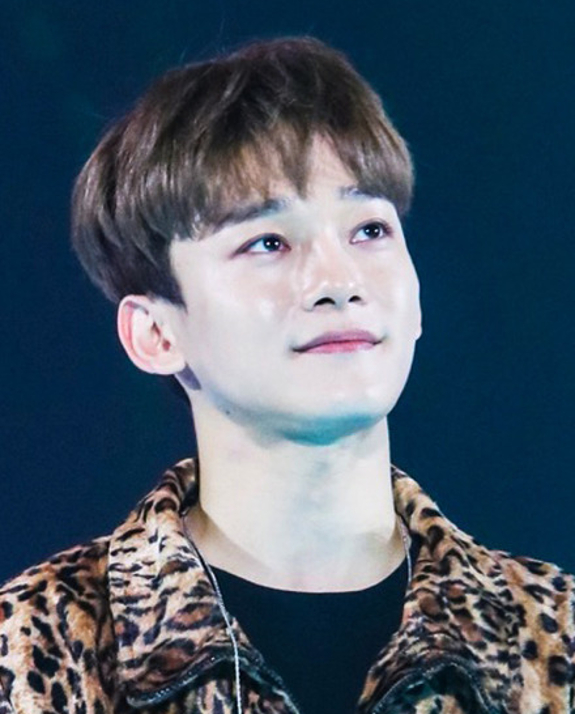
"Beautiful Goodbye" by Chen of Exo earned the singer his first Inkigayo award as a soloist.

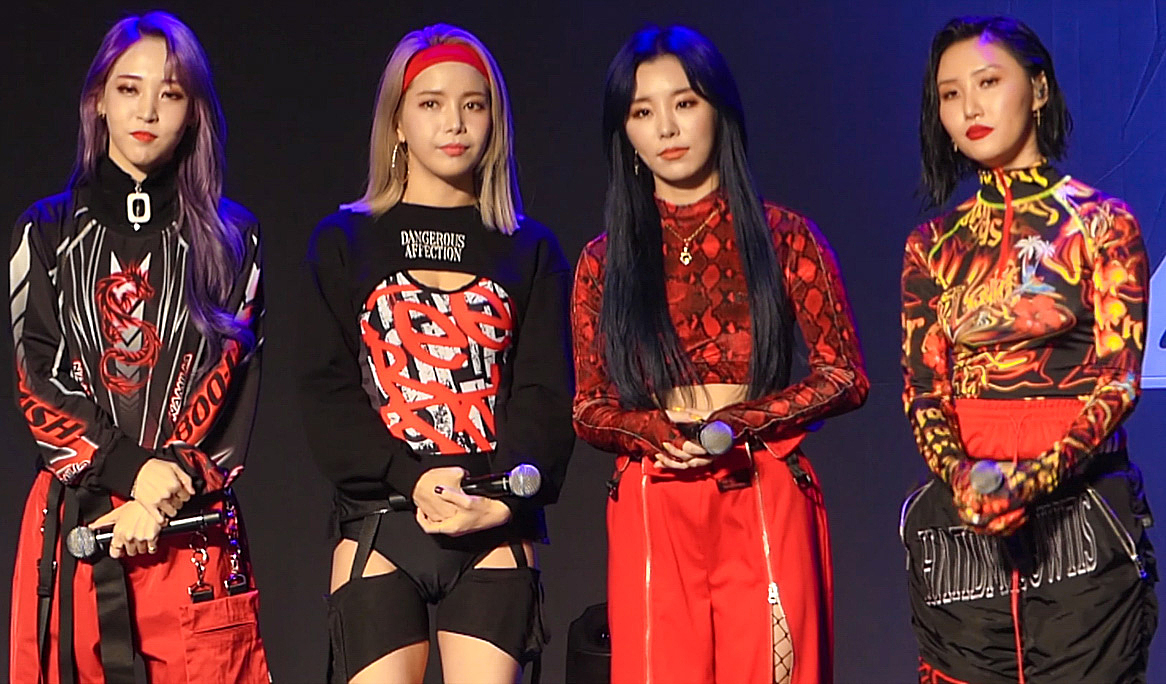
Mamamoo collected three wins with "Hip", achieving a second Inkigayo Triple Crown in the group's career.

Key
†	Indicates the song achieved a Triple Crown
‡	Indicates the highest score of the year
—	No show was held

Chart history
Episode	Date	Artist	Song	Points	Ref.
985	January 6	Winner	"Millions"	6,453	
986	January 13	Chungha	"Gotta Go"	8,918	
987	January 20	Apink	"%% (Eung Eung)"	6,690	
988	January 27	GFriend	"Sunrise"	7,594	
989	February 3	Seventeen	"Home"	6,696	
—	February 10	Woody	"Fire Up"	5,790	
990	February 17	Woody	"Fire Up"	5,905	
991	February 24	Itzy	"Dalla Dalla" †	7,749	
992	March 3	Itzy	"Dalla Dalla" †	6,955	
993	March 10	Itzy	"Dalla Dalla" †	6,694	
994	March 17	N.Flying	"Rooftop"	5,657	
995	March 24	Epik High	"Love Drunk"	7,212	
996	March 31	Mamamoo	"Gogobebe"	7,249	
997	April 7	Taeyeon	"Four Seasons"	7,892	
998	April 14	Chen	"Beautiful Goodbye"	6,007	
999	April 21	Blackpink	"Kill This Love"	8,163	
1,000	April 28	BTS	"Boy with Luv" †	11,000 ‡	
—	May 5	Twice	"Fancy"	9,841	
1,001	May 12	BTS	"Boy with Luv" †	9,679	
1,002	May 19	BTS	"Boy with Luv" †	8,659	
1,003	May 26	Blackpink	"Kill This Love"	6,271	
1,004	June 2	Got7	"Eclipse"	5,002	
1,005	June 9	Davichi	"Unspoken Words"	5,483	
1,006	June 16	Lee Hi	"No One"	6,516	
1,007	June 23	Kim Na-young	"To Be Honest"	5,953	
—	June 30	Red Velvet	"Zimzalabim"	8,012	
1,008	July 7	Chungha	"Snapping"	8,565	
1,009	July 14	GFriend	"Fever"	6,857	
1,010	July 21	Heize	"We Don't Talk Together"	6,068	
1,011	July 28	Ben	"Thank You for Goodbye"	5,781	
1,012	August 4	Ben	"Thank You for Goodbye"	5,806	
1,013	August 11	Itzy	"Icy"	8,317	
1,014	August 18	Oh My Girl	"Bungee"	6,099	
1,015	August 25	Itzy	"Icy"	5,905	
1,016	September 1	Red Velvet	"Umpah Umpah"	8,317	
1,017	September 8	X1	"Flash"	6,628	
—	September 15	X1	"Flash"	6,771	
1,018	September 22	Bolbbalgan4	"Workaholic"	6,597	
1,019	September 29	Bolbbalgan4	"Workaholic"	6,281	
1,020	October 6	Twice	"Feel Special"	8,182	
—	October 13	Twice	"Feel Special"	6,505	
1,021	October 20	AKMU	"How Can I Love the Heartbreak, You're the One I Love"	6,166	
—	October 27	AKMU	"How Can I Love the Heartbreak, You're the One I Love"	6,234	
1,022	November 3	NU'EST	"Love Me"	6,024	
1,023	November 10	Taeyeon	"Spark"	9,782	
1,024	November 17	IU	"Love Poem"	6,099	
1,025	November 24	Mamamoo	"Hip" †	6,879	
1,026	December 1	IU	"Blueming" †	9,703	
1,027	December 8	IU	"Blueming" †	6,521	
1,028	December 15	IU	"Blueming" †	7,040	
—	December 22	Mamamoo	"Hip" †	6,231	
—	December 29	Mamamoo	"Hip" †	6,330	

== See also ==
- List of M Countdown Chart winners (2019)
- List of Music Bank Chart winners (2019)
- List of Show! Music Core Chart winners (2019)
