= Flourishing (EP) =

2019 extended play by Chung Ha

- Digital cover

EP by Chung Ha
- Released: June 24, 2019
- Recorded: 2019
- Genre: K-pop
- Length: 17:22
- Labels: MNH; Stone Music

Chung Ha chronology
XII (2018)	Flourishing (2019)	Maxi Single (2021)

Singles from Flourishing
- 1. "Snapping" Released: June 24, 2019

Flourishing is the fourth extended play by South Korean singer Chung Ha. It was released by MNH Entertainment and distributed by Stone Music Entertainment on June 24, 2019. "Snapping" was released as the title track on the same day. It is her first EP since the release of Blooming Blue in July 2018.

== Background and release ==
On June 12, 2019, it was reported that Chung Ha was returning with new music, after five months since the release of her single "Gotta Go". It was revealed that Flourishing would be an extended play and would be released on June 24 at 6 p.m. KST. A timetable was also released revealing that from June 12 to June 21 teasers would be released, ending with a showcase on June 24 and the CD release a day later. The first teaser image showed a drastic change of image from the singer as she tried blonde hair for the first time and a more mature concept. A second teaser image was released two days later, reporting that this would be her third summer album after Hands On Me (2017) and Blooming Blue (2018). Two days later the third and final teaser image was released, showing the singer in a red aesthetic set. The EP marks the first time that Chung Ha has released a song with hip hop elements, as she rapped for the first time on "Flourishing".

The EP was released on June 24, 2019, through several music portals including iTunes.

== Track listing ==
Digital download/CD

No.	Title	Lyrics	Music	Arrangement	Length
1.	"Chica"	VINCENZO; Any Masingga; Fuxxy; Anna Timgren	VINCENZO; Any Masingga; Fuxxy; Anna Timgren	VINCENZO; Any Masingga	3:12
2.	"Young in Love" (우리가 즐거워)	Baek Ye-rin	Baek Ye-rin; Cloud	Cloud	3:18
3.	"Call It Love"	Shim Eunji	Shim Eunji	Shim Eunji	4:01
4.	"Flourishing"	Chung Ha; Anna Timgren; VINCENZO	Chung Ha; Anna Timgren; VINCENZO	Vincenzo	3:15
5.	"Snapping"	Park Woo-sang; Sola	Park Woo-sang	Park Woo-sang; Ha Jae-wan	3:33
Total length:					17:22

== Charts ==
Chart (2019)	Peak position
South Korean Albums (Gaon)	6
US Heatseekers Albums (Billboard)	25
US World Albums (Billboard)	7

== Release history ==
Region	Date	Format	Label
Various	June 24, 2019	Digital download, streaming	MNH Entertainment Stone Music Entertainment
South Korea	June 25, 2019	CD	MNH Entertainment Stone Music Entertainment
