= List of Music Bank Chart winners (2019) =

Music Bank Chart winners (2019)

Highlights
- Song with most wins: "Boy with Luv" by BTS (7)
- Artist(s) with most wins: BTS (7)
- Song with highest score: "Boy with Luv" by BTS (13,007)

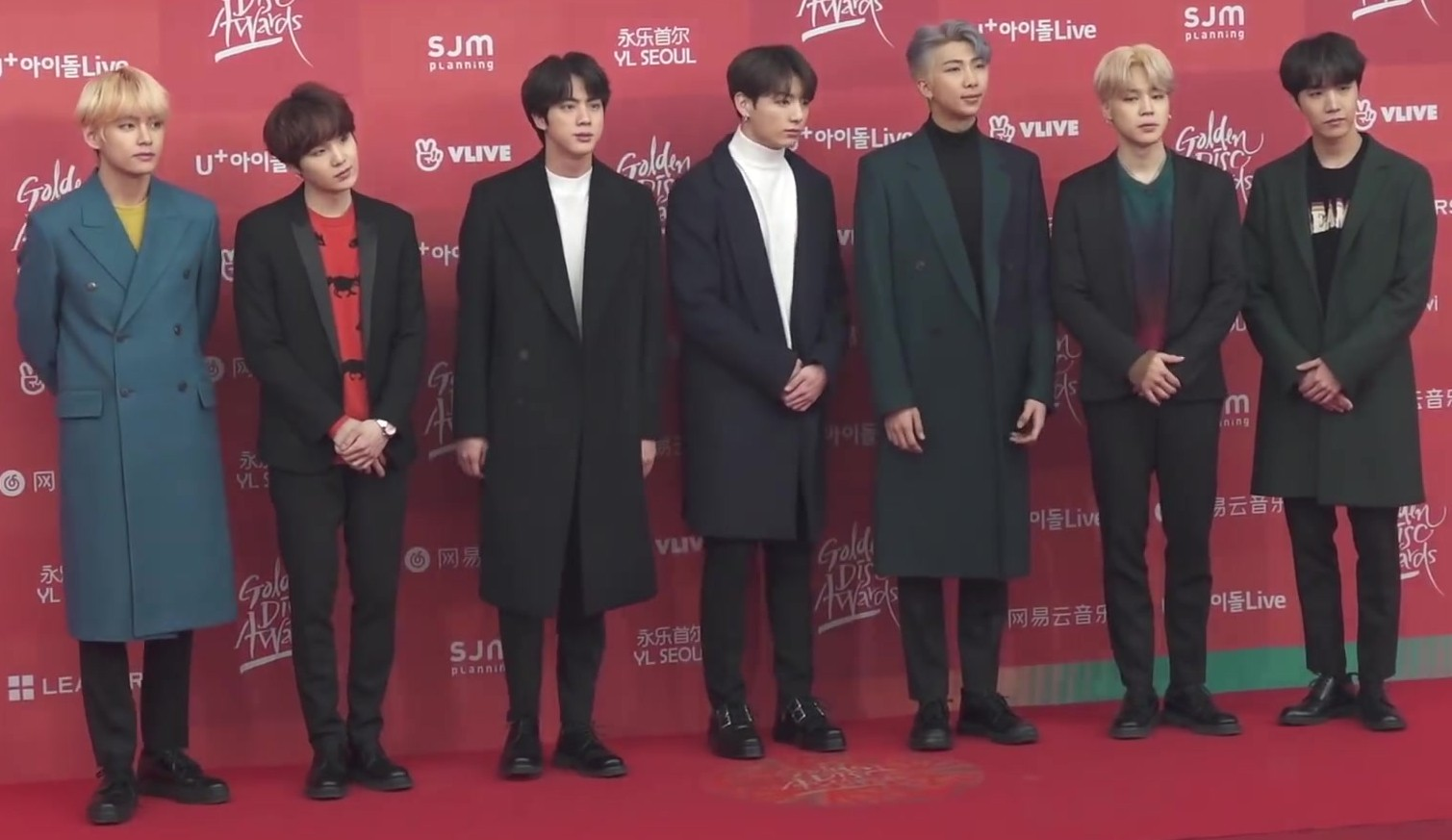
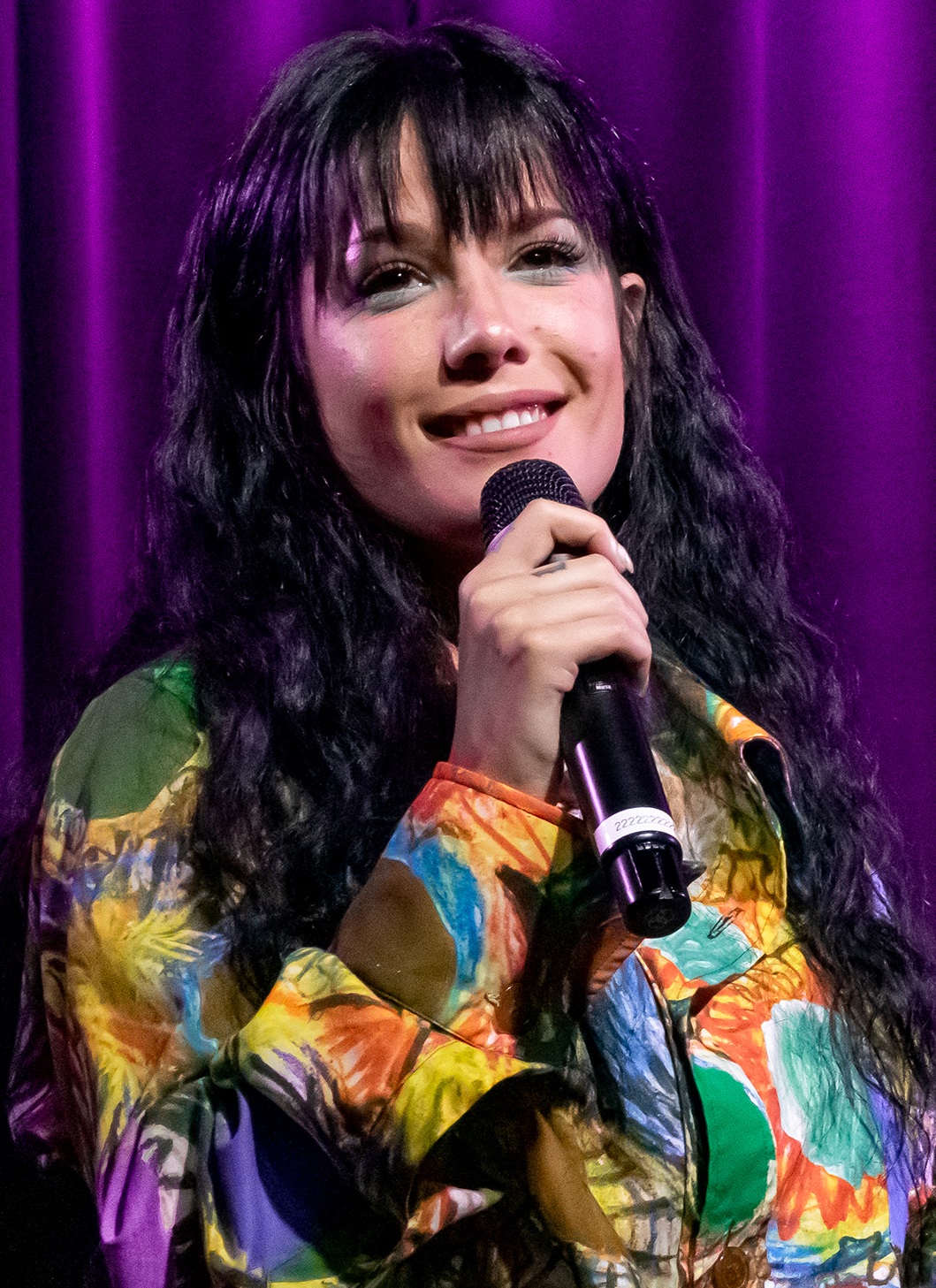
"Boy with Luv" by BTS (left) and Halsey (right) received the highest score of 2019, earning 13,007 points on the April 26 broadcast and winning for seven weeks.

The Music Bank Chart is a record chart established in 1998 on the South Korean KBS television music program Music Bank. Every week during its live broadcast, the show gives an award for the best-performing single on the South Korean chart. The chart includes digital performance on domestic online music services (65%), album sales (5%), number of times the single was broadcast on KBS TV (20%), and viewers' choice (10%) in its ranking methodology. The score for domestic online music services is calculated using data from Melon, Bugs, Genie Music and Soribada. The show was hosted by actor Choi Won-myeong and Lovelyz member Kei from June 15, 2018, until June 28, 2019. Actress Shin Ye-eun and Golden Child member Choi Bo-min were announced as new hosts the following week.

In 2019, 38 singles achieved a number one on the chart and 28 music acts were awarded first-place trophies. "Boy with Luv" by BTS and American singer-songwriter Halsey won for seven weeks and is the song with the most wins of the year. The seven number ones helped BTS become the act with the most wins of the year. The song also acquired the highest point total on the April 26 broadcast with a score of 13,007. Ten acts achieved more than one number one on the chart in 2019. The first number one of the year was achieved by Exo with their single "Tempo"; the group went on to have another number one single in December with "Obsession" which spent two consecutive weeks at the top. NU'EST ranked number one on the chart for the first time with "Bet Bet" over seven years after their debut. Their single "Love Me" went on to rank number one on the chart on the November 1 broadcast. Two other boy groups ranked more than one single at number one on the chart in 2019: Got7 with "Eclipse" and "You Calling My Name", and Seventeen with "Home" and "Fear".

Former I.O.I member Chungha achieved two number one singles with "Gotta Go" and "Snapping". Singer-songwriter IU ranked two singles at number one on the chart, achieved with "Love Poem" and "Blueming". Four girl groups had more than one number one single on the chart. Itzy won on Music Bank for the first time with their debut single "Dalla Dalla" and went on to rank another single at number one with "Icy" in August. Both singles ranked number one for two weeks. GFriend, Mamamoo and Red Velvet ranked two singles at number one with "Sunrise" and "Fever", "Gogobebe" and "Hip", and "Zimzalabim" and "Umpah Umpah", respectively.

Besides Itzy and NU'EST, seven other acts achieved their first number one on Music Bank in 2019. Exo's subunit Exo-SC achieved their first music show award for "What a Life". Exo member Baekhyun ranked number one on a music show for the first time with "UN Village" on Music Bank while fellow member Chen achieved his first Music Bank award with "Shall We?". Duo Bolbbalgan4's single "Workaholic" helped them achieve their first number one on the chart on the September 20 broadcast. Former members of Wanna One – a group formed through the second season of the survival reality show Produce 101 – Kang Daniel and Park Ji-hoon won their first ever music show award with "What Are You Up To" and "L.O.V.E", respectively. Iz*One and X1, formed through the third and fourth seasons of Produce 101 gained their first number one on the chart with "Violeta" and "Flash", respectively. The latter group would go on to disband in January 2023 due to the Mnet vote manipulation investigation.

== Chart history ==
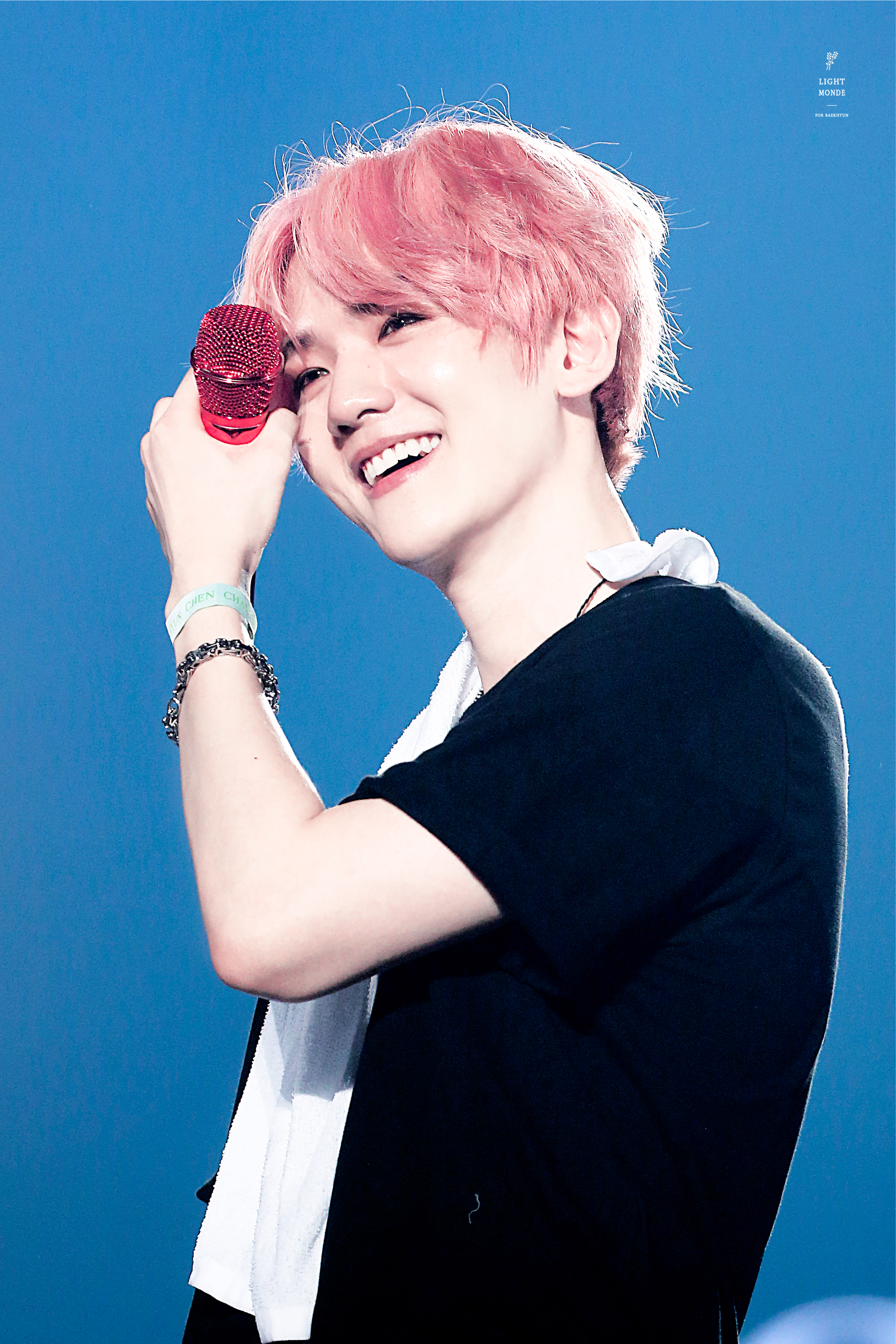
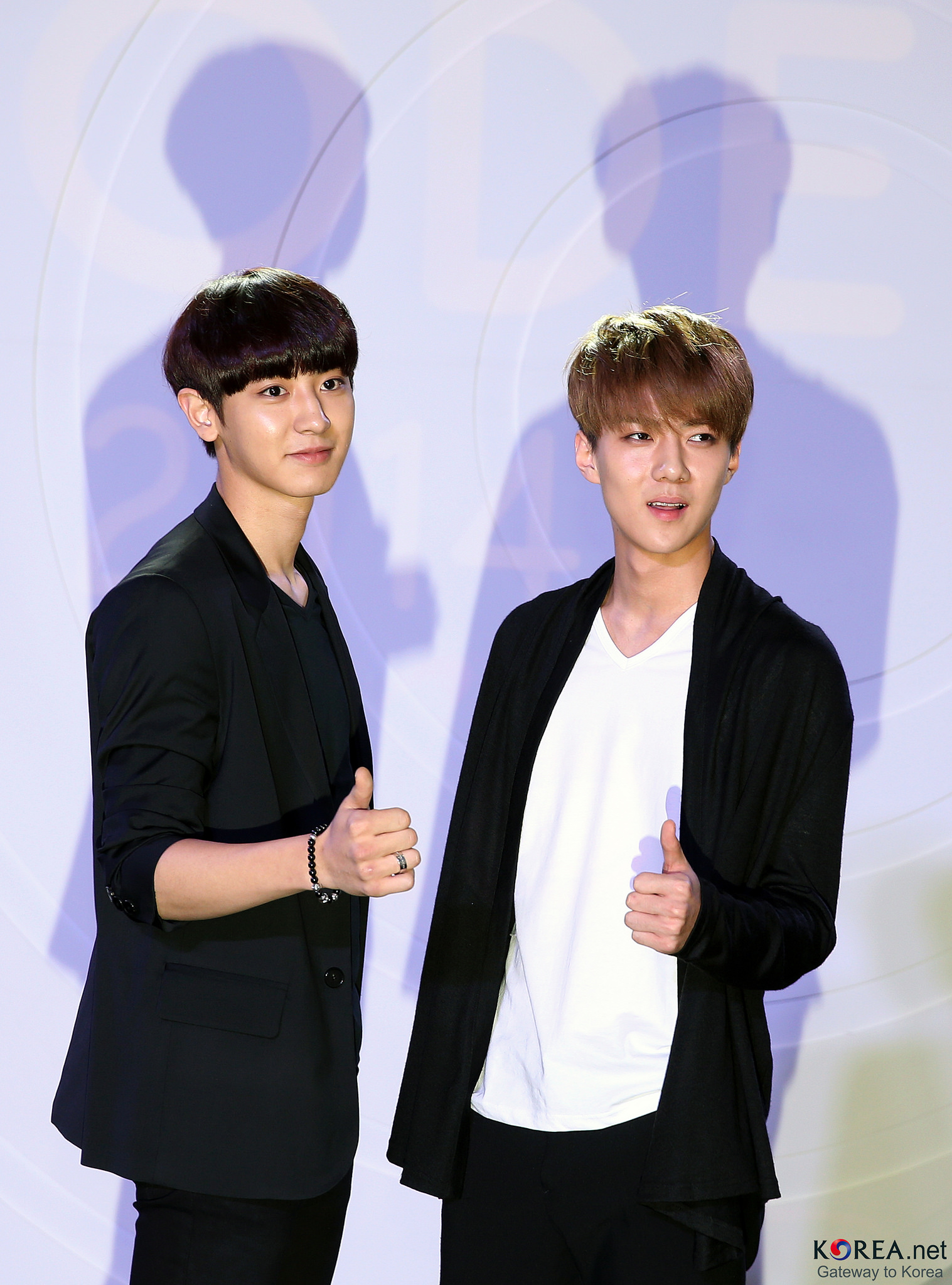
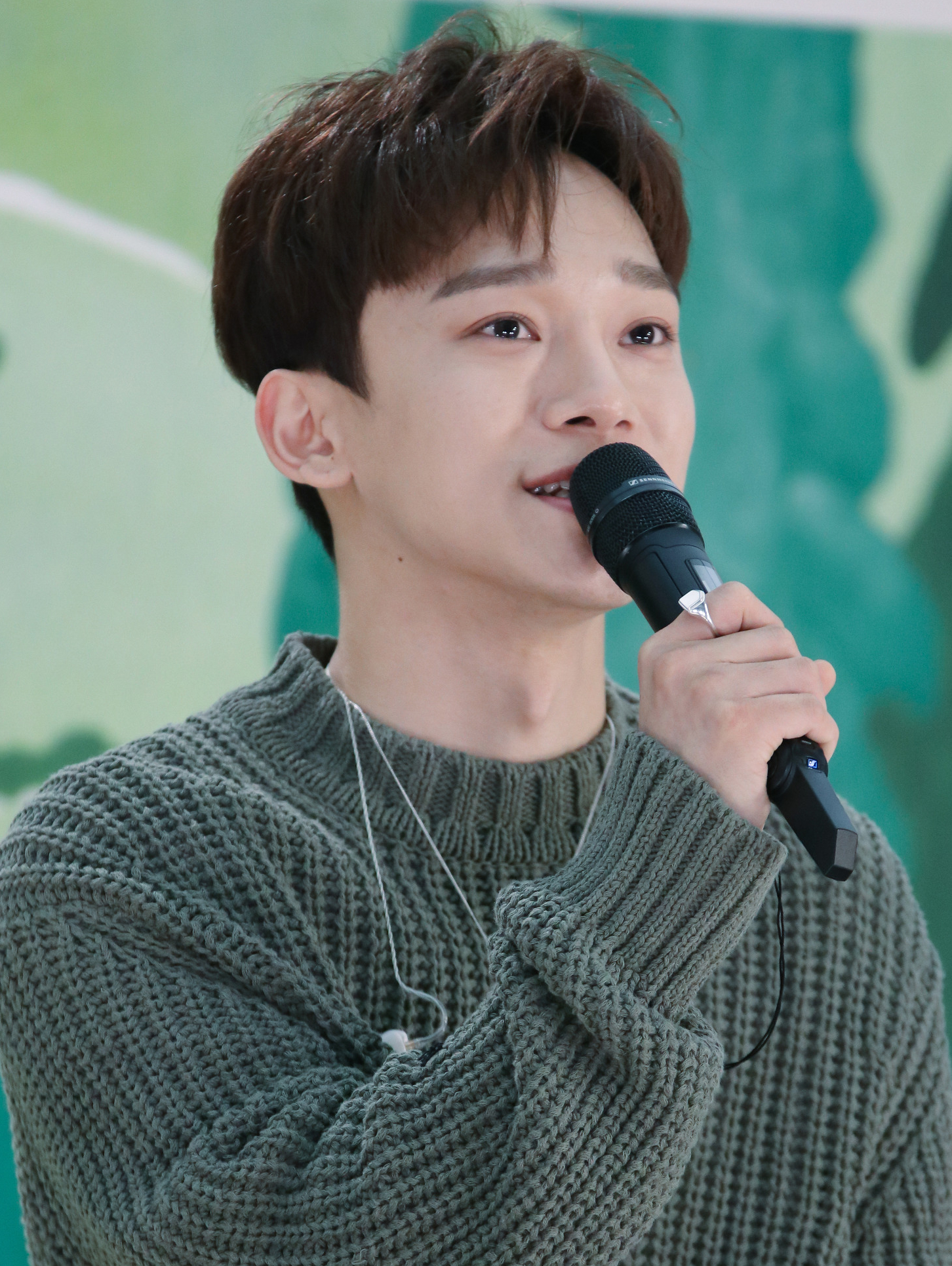
Several members of Exo won Music Bank in 2019: Baekhyun (left) and sub-unit Exo-SC (middle) received their first music show wins for "UN Village" and "What a Life", respectively, while Chen (right) won his first Music Bank award for "Shall We?".
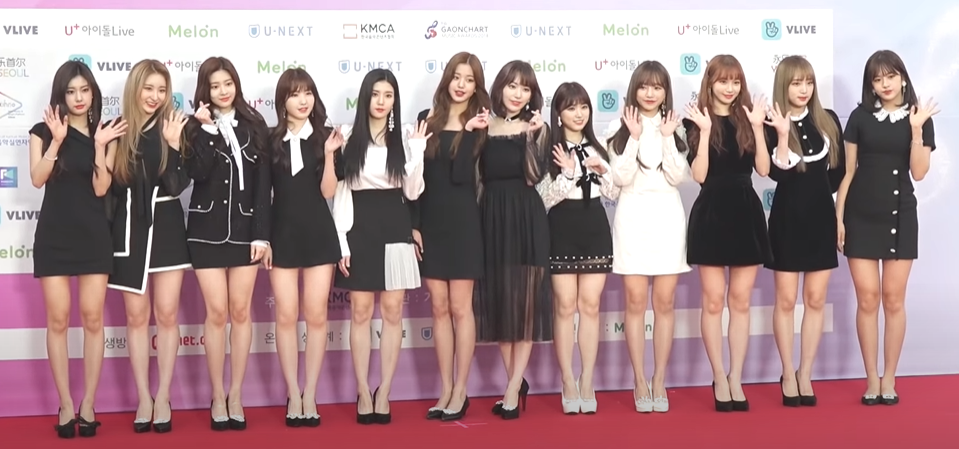
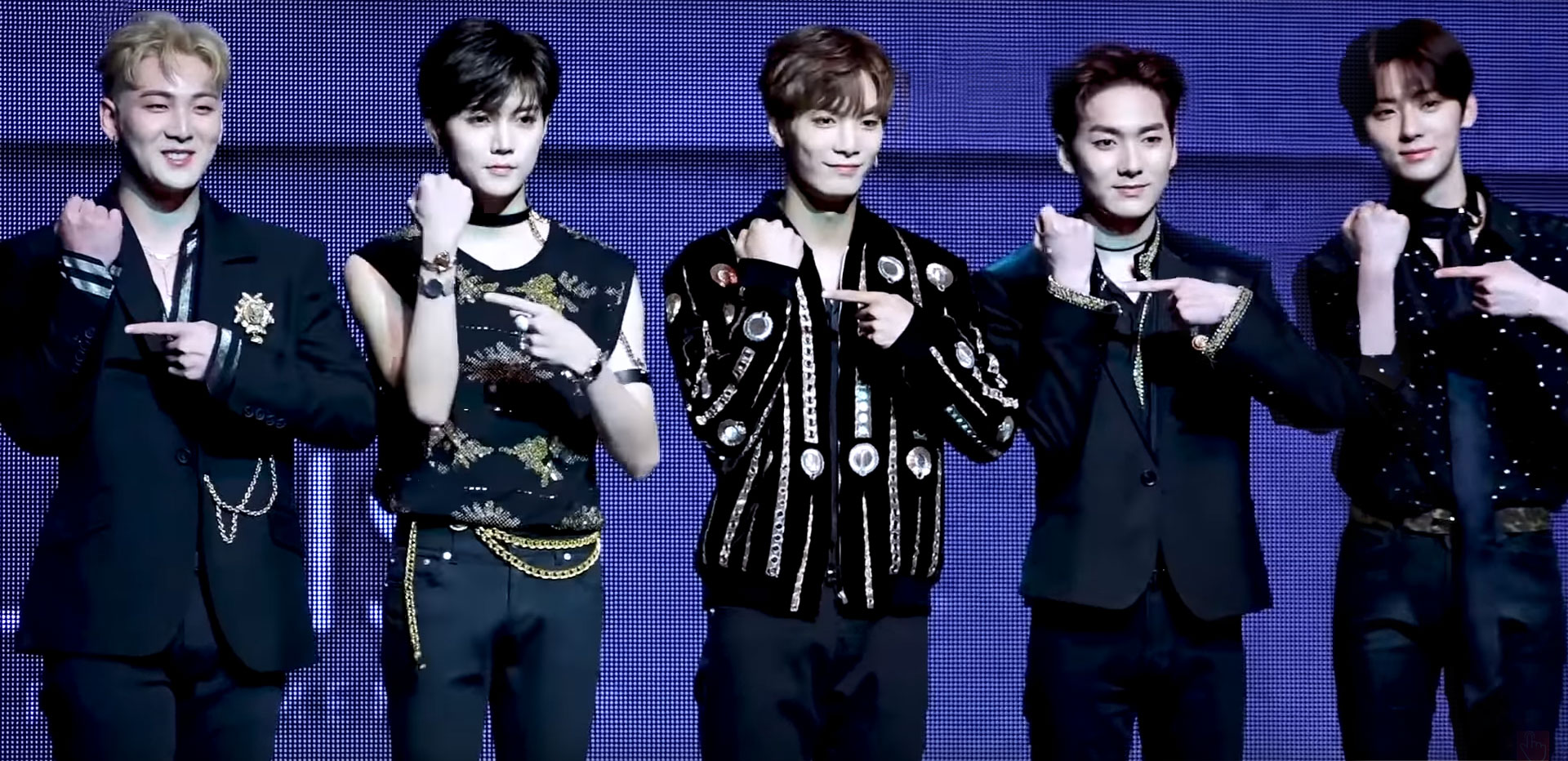
Iz*One (top) and NU'EST (bottom) received their first broadcast music show wins with their Music Bank trophies for "Violeta" and "Bet Bet", respectively.
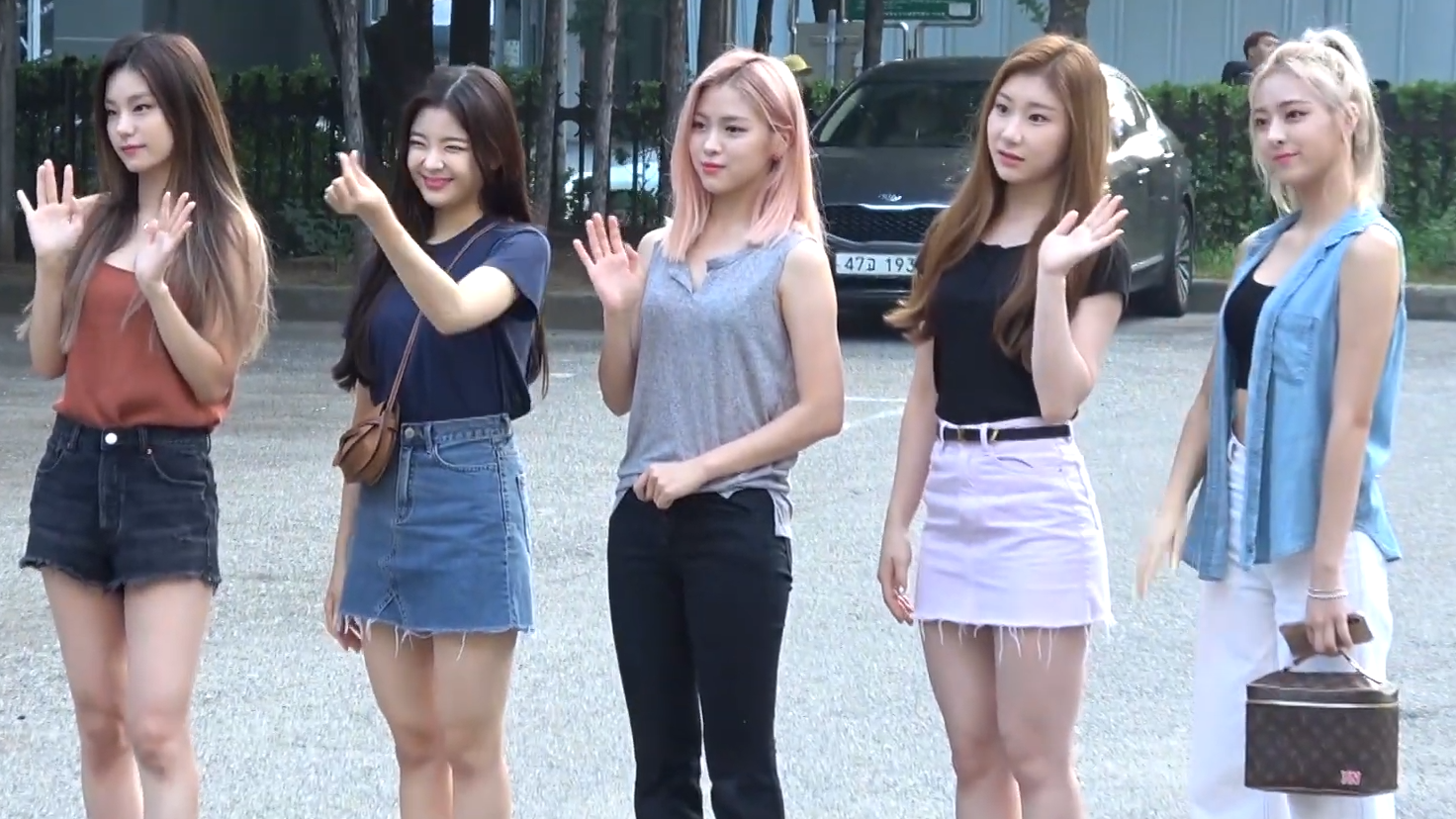
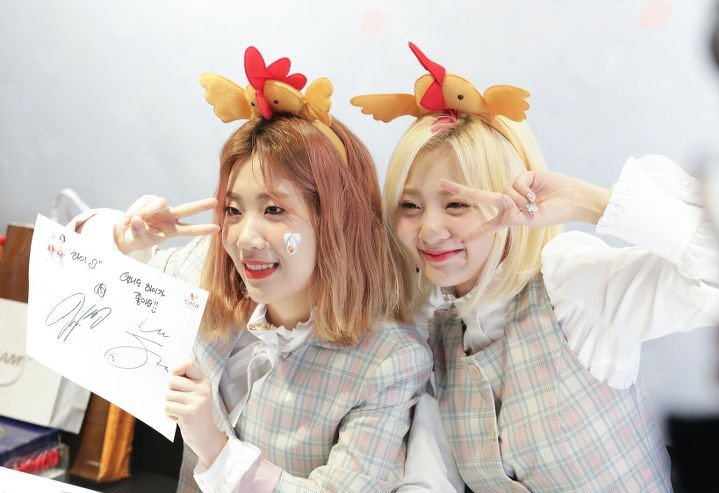
Itzy (top) and Bolbbalgan4 (bottom) won Music Bank for the first time with "Dalla Dalla" and "Workaholic", respectively.
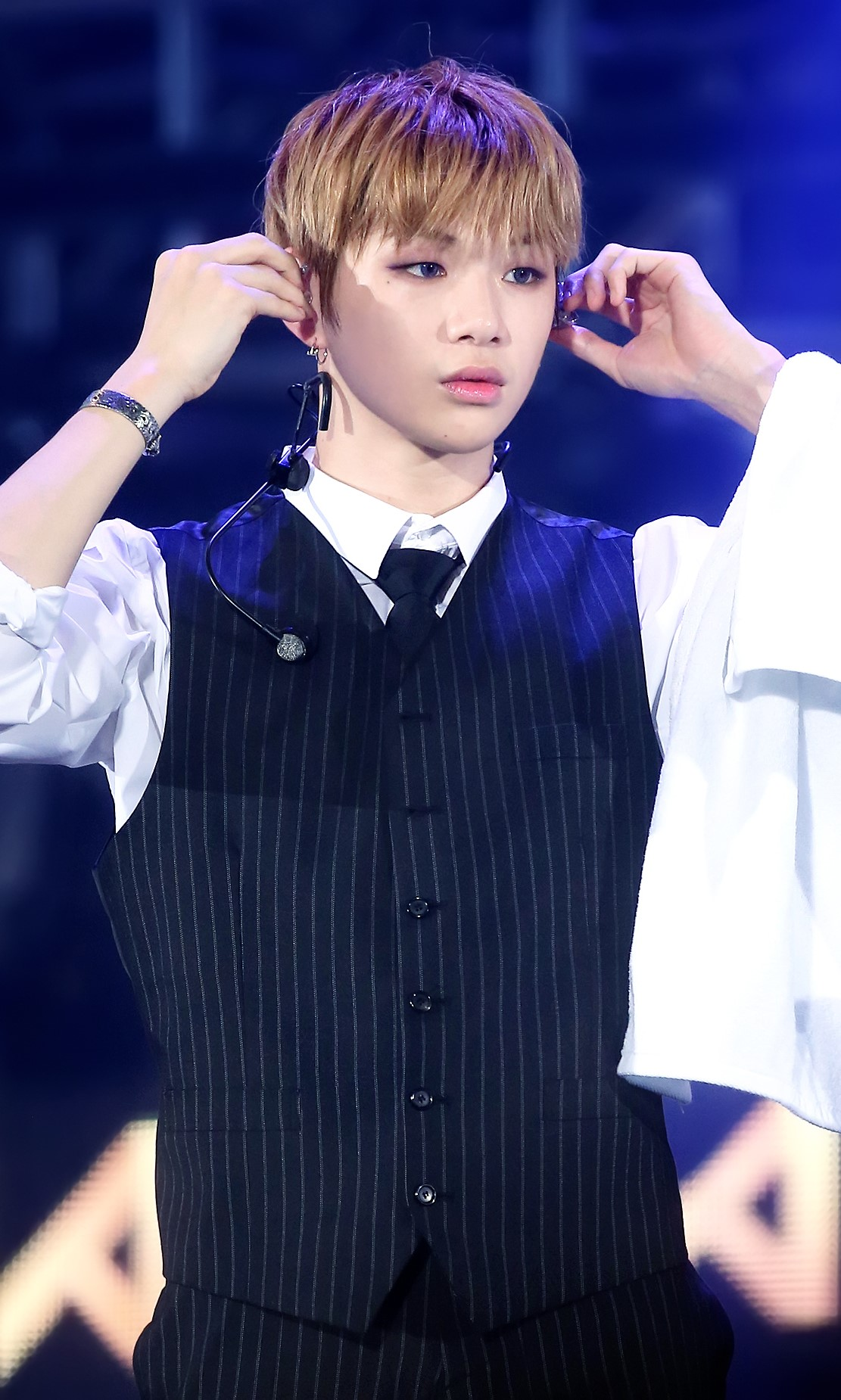
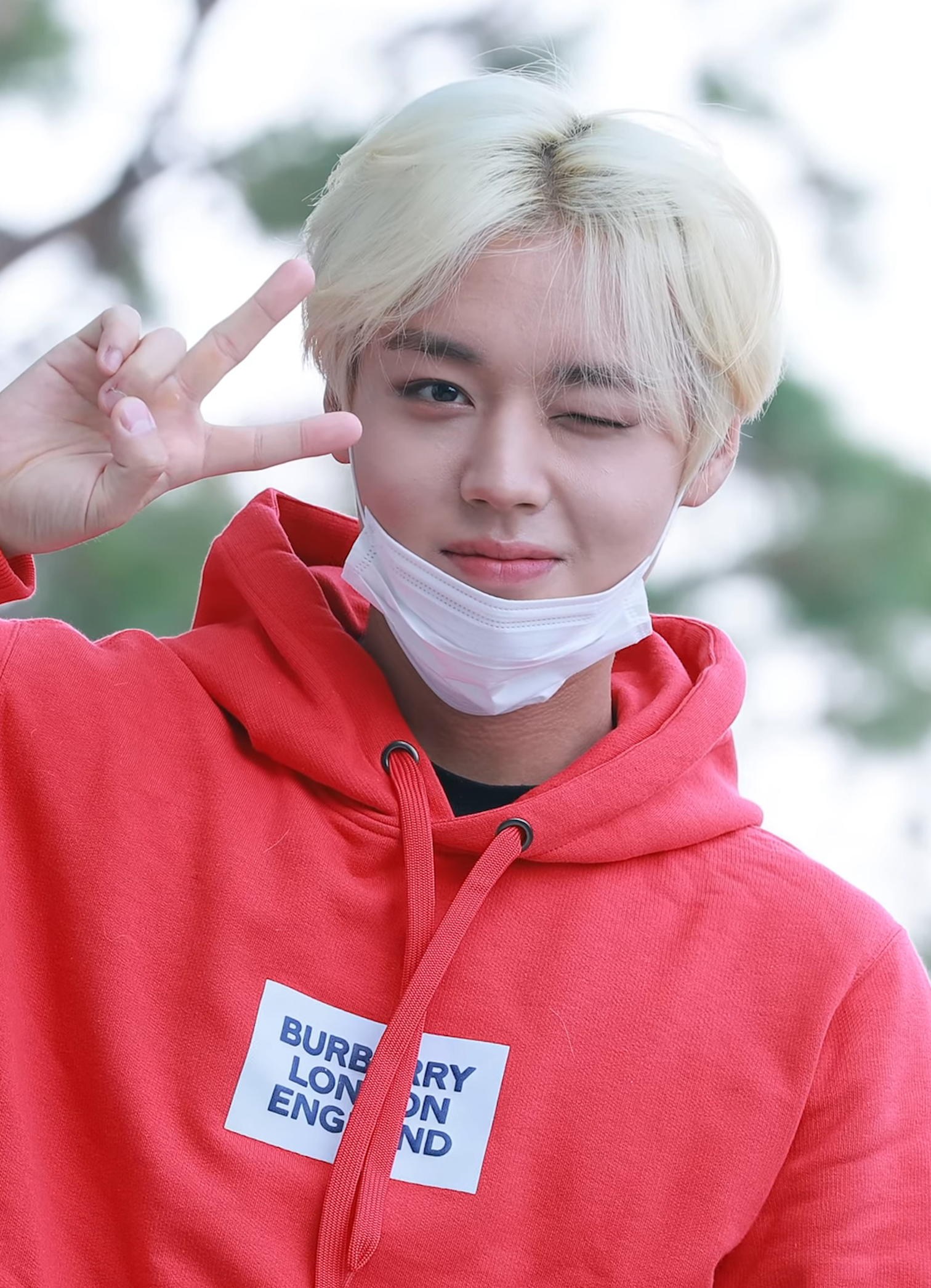
Former Wanna One members Kang Daniel (left) and Park Ji-hoon (right) won their first ever music show trophies as soloists with their wins for "What Are You Up To" and "L.O.V.E", respectively.

Key
‡	Highest score in 2019
—	No show was broadcast

Chart history
Episode	Date	Artist	Song	Points	Ref(s)
961	January 4	Exo	"Tempo"	9,055	
962	January 11	Winner	"Millions"	3,382	
963	January 18	Chungha	"Gotta Go"	4,824	
964	January 25	GFriend	"Sunrise"	5,600	
965	February 1	Seventeen	"Home"	9,466	
966	February 8	Seventeen	"Home"	4,017	
967	February 15	Seventeen	"Home"	5,249	
968	February 22	Taemin	"Want"	7,141	
969	March 1	Monsta X	"Alligator"	6,922	
970	March 8	Itzy	"Dalla Dalla"	5,104	
971	March 15	Itzy	"Dalla Dalla"	4,405	
972	March 22	Epik High	"Lovedrunk"	4,397	
973	March 29	Mamamoo	"Gogobebe"	4,691	
974	April 5	Park Ji-hoon	"L.O.V.E"	6,030	
975	April 12	Iz*One	"Violeta"	7,238	
976	April 19	BTS	"Boy with Luv"	11,231	
977	April 26	BTS	"Boy with Luv"	13,007 ‡	
978	May 3	BTS	"Boy with Luv"	7,397	
979	May 10	NU'EST	"Bet Bet"	8,586	
980	May 17	BTS	"Boy with Luv"	6,092	
981	May 24	BTS	"Boy with Luv"	7,662	
982 (Note: Episode 982 was recorded on May 31 and broadcast on June 7.)	May 31	Got7	"Eclipse"	5,101	
— (Note: This week's winners were announced on the station's official website.)	June 7	NCT 127	"Superhuman"	4,458	
983	June 14	BTS	"Boy with Luv"	4,591	
984	June 21	BTS	"Boy with Luv"	4,427	
985	June 28	Red Velvet	"Zimzalabim"	4,868	
986	July 5	Chungha	"Snapping"	5,592	
987	July 12	GFriend	"Fever"	5,014	
988	July 19	Baekhyun	"UN Village"	8,401	
989	July 26	Baekhyun	"UN Village"	6,266	
990	August 2	Exo-SC	"What a Life"	7,164	
991	August 9	Kang Daniel	"What Are You Up To"	8,177	
992	August 16	Itzy	"Icy"	4,440	
993	August 23	Itzy	"Icy"	4,094	
994	August 30	Red Velvet	"Umpah Umpah"	4,898	
995 (Note: Episode 995 was recorded on September 6 and broadcast on September 13.)	September 6	X1	"Flash"	9,021	
—	September 13	X1	"Flash"	6,407	
996	September 20	Bolbbalgan4	"Workaholic"	3,539	
997	September 27	Seventeen	"Fear"	11,565	
998	October 4	Twice	"Feel Special"	8,821	
999	October 11	Chen	"Shall We?"	7,161	
1,000	October 18	AKMU	"How Can I Love the Heartbreak, You're the One I Love"	5,190	
1,001	October 25	Super Junior	"Super Clap"	8,514	
1,002	November 1	NU'EST	"Love Me"	6,660	
1,003	November 8	Taeyeon	"Spark"	6,104	
1,004	November 15	Got7	"You Calling My Name"	5,937	
1,005	November 22	Mamamoo	"Hip"	5,163	
1,006	November 29	IU	"Love Poem"	8,329	
1,007	December 6	Exo	"Obsession"	8,970	
1,008	December 13	Exo	"Obsession"	5,716	
1,009	December 20	IU	"Blueming"	4,527	
—	December 27	IU	"Blueming"	4,116	
