= List of Show! Music Core Chart winners (2019) =

Show! Music Core Chart winners (2019)

Highlights
- Song with most wins: "Boy with Luv" by BTS (9)
- Artist(s) with most wins: BTS (9)
- Song with highest score: "Boy with Luv" by BTS (10,000)

The Show! Music Core Chart is a record chart on the South Korean MBC television music program Show! Music Core. Every week, the show awards the best-performing single on the chart in the country during its live broadcast. This is a list of 2019 winners.

== Chart history ==
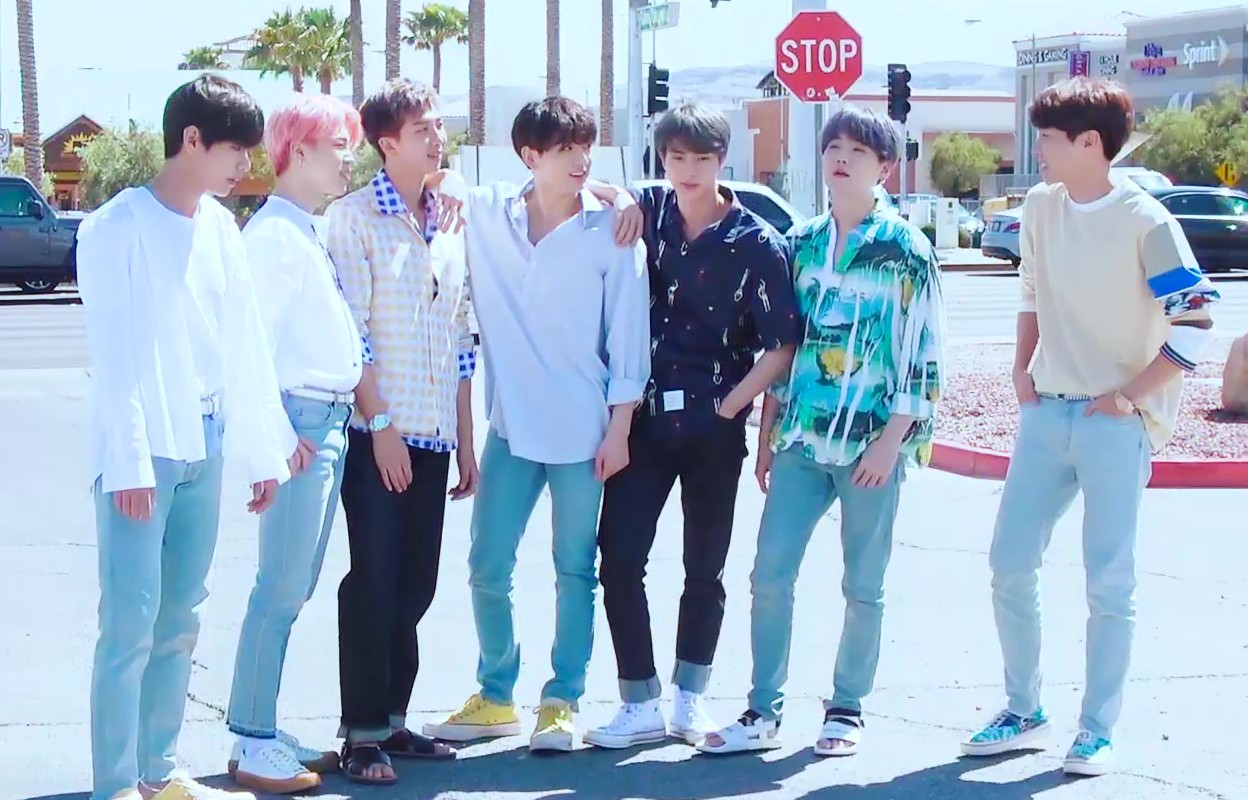
"Boy with Luv" by BTS (pictured) featuring Halsey was the highest-scoring song on Show! Music Core for 2019, winning first place on the April 27 broadcast with 10,000 points. The song was number one for nine weeks.

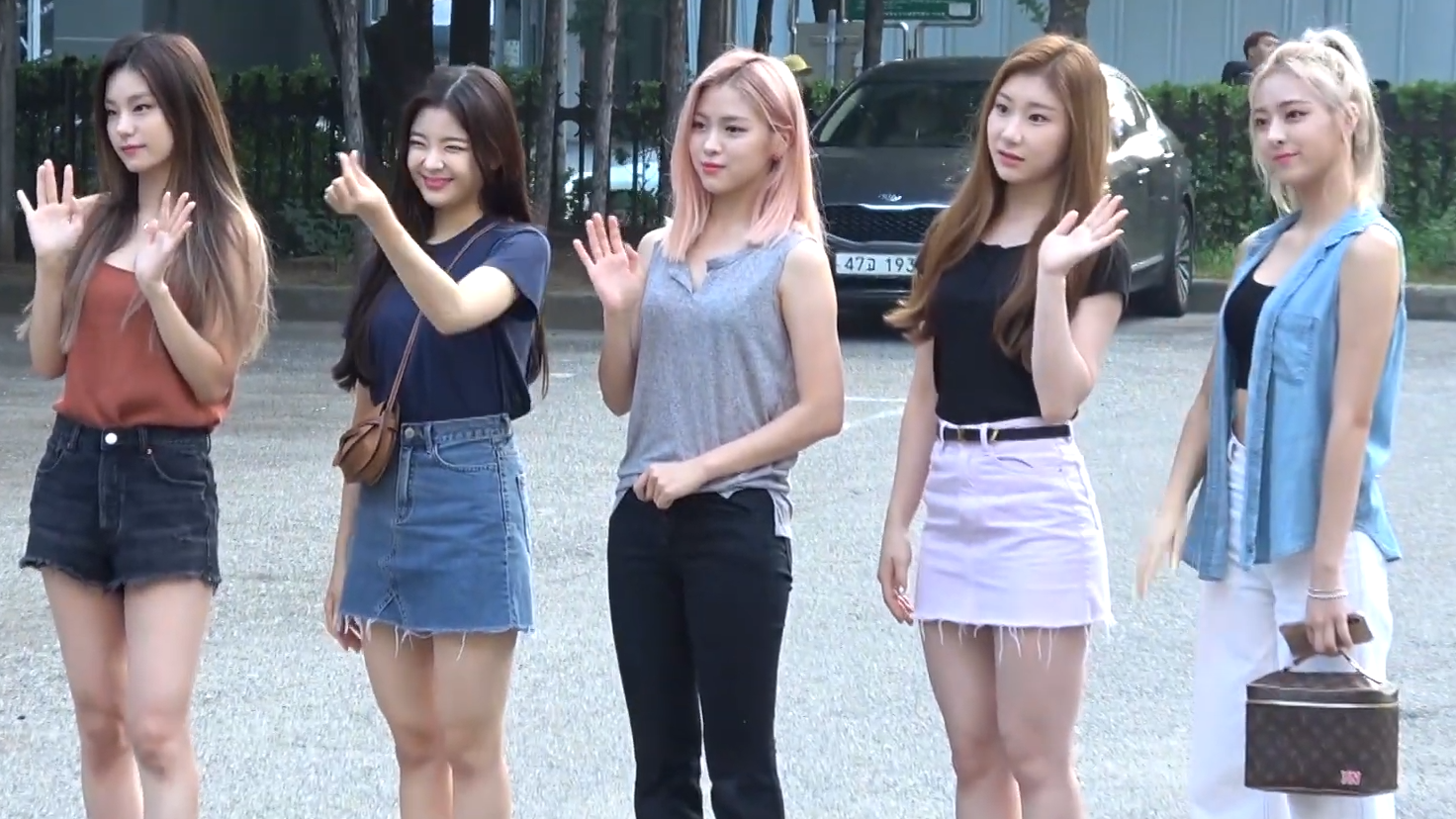
Itzy (pictured) received their first Show! Music Core trophy with their debut song "Dalla Dalla."

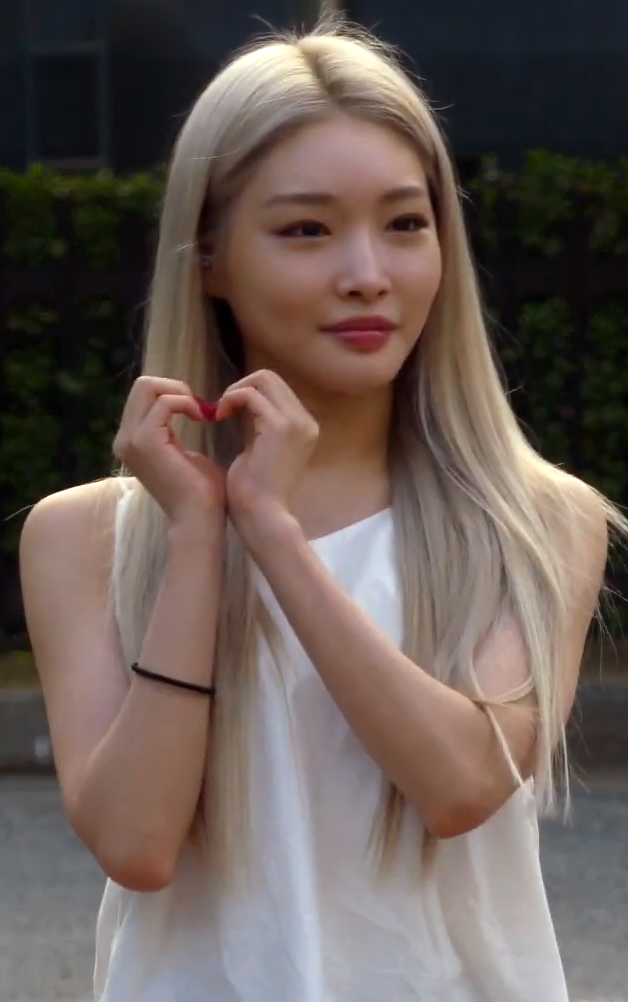
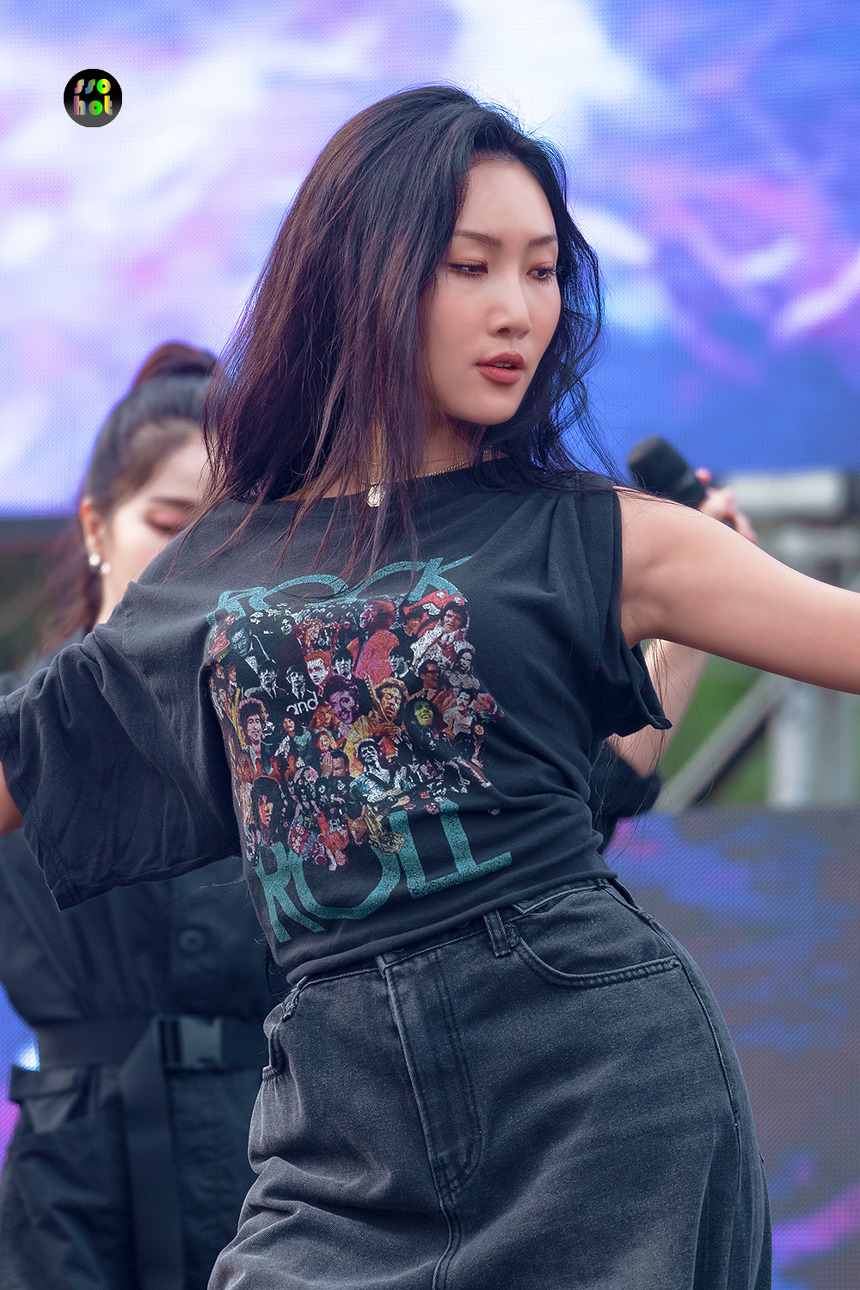
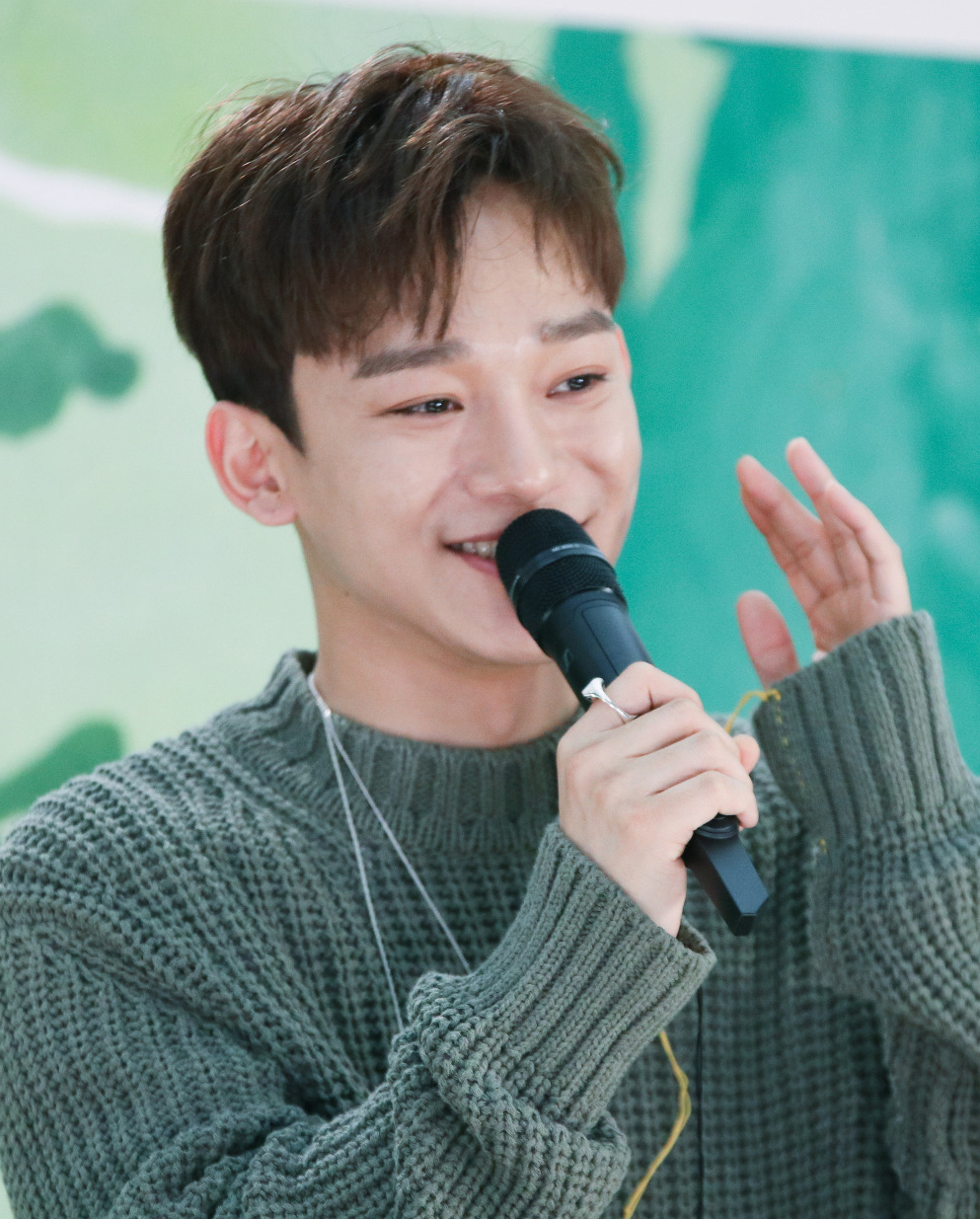
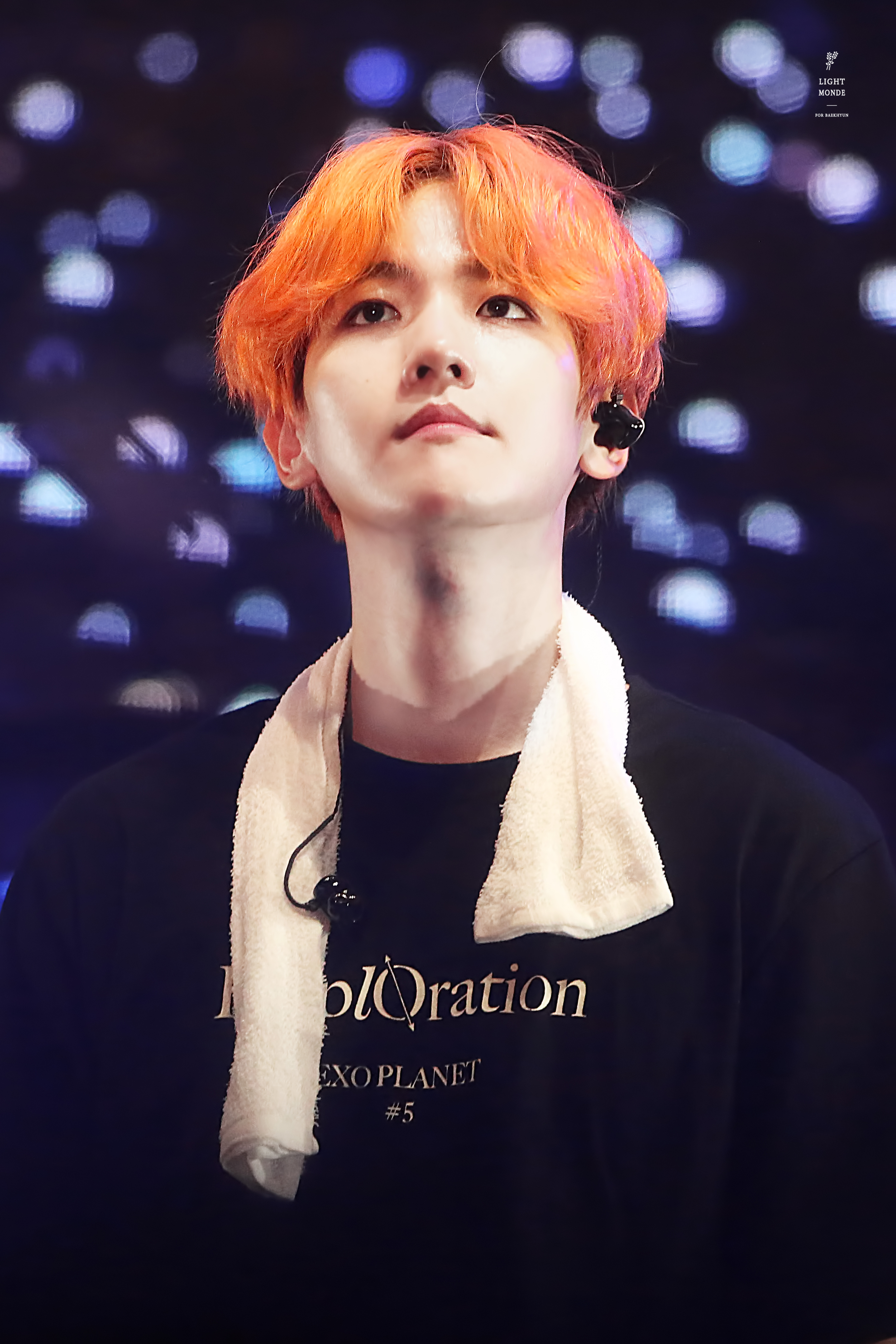
Soloists Chungha (upper left), Mamamoo's Hwasa (upper right), and Exo's Chen (lower left) and Baekhyun (lower right) won their first Show! Music Core trophies for "Gotta Go," "Twit," "Beautiful Goodbye," and "UN Village," respectively.

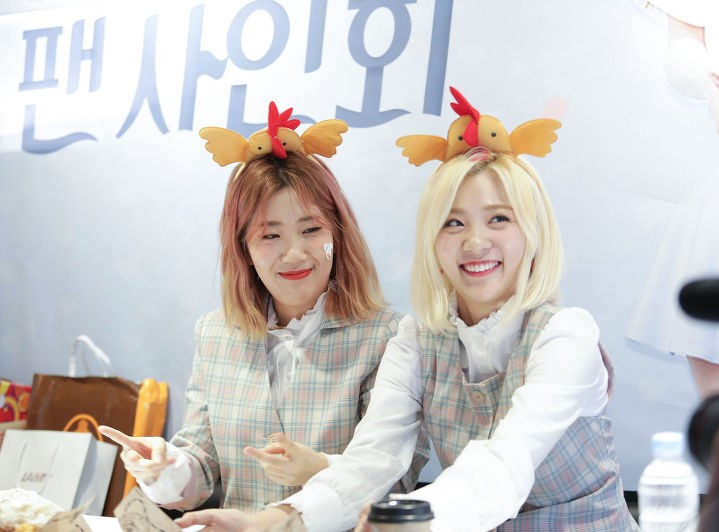
"Workaholic" by Bolbbalgan4 (pictured) marked the group's first Show! Music Core win.

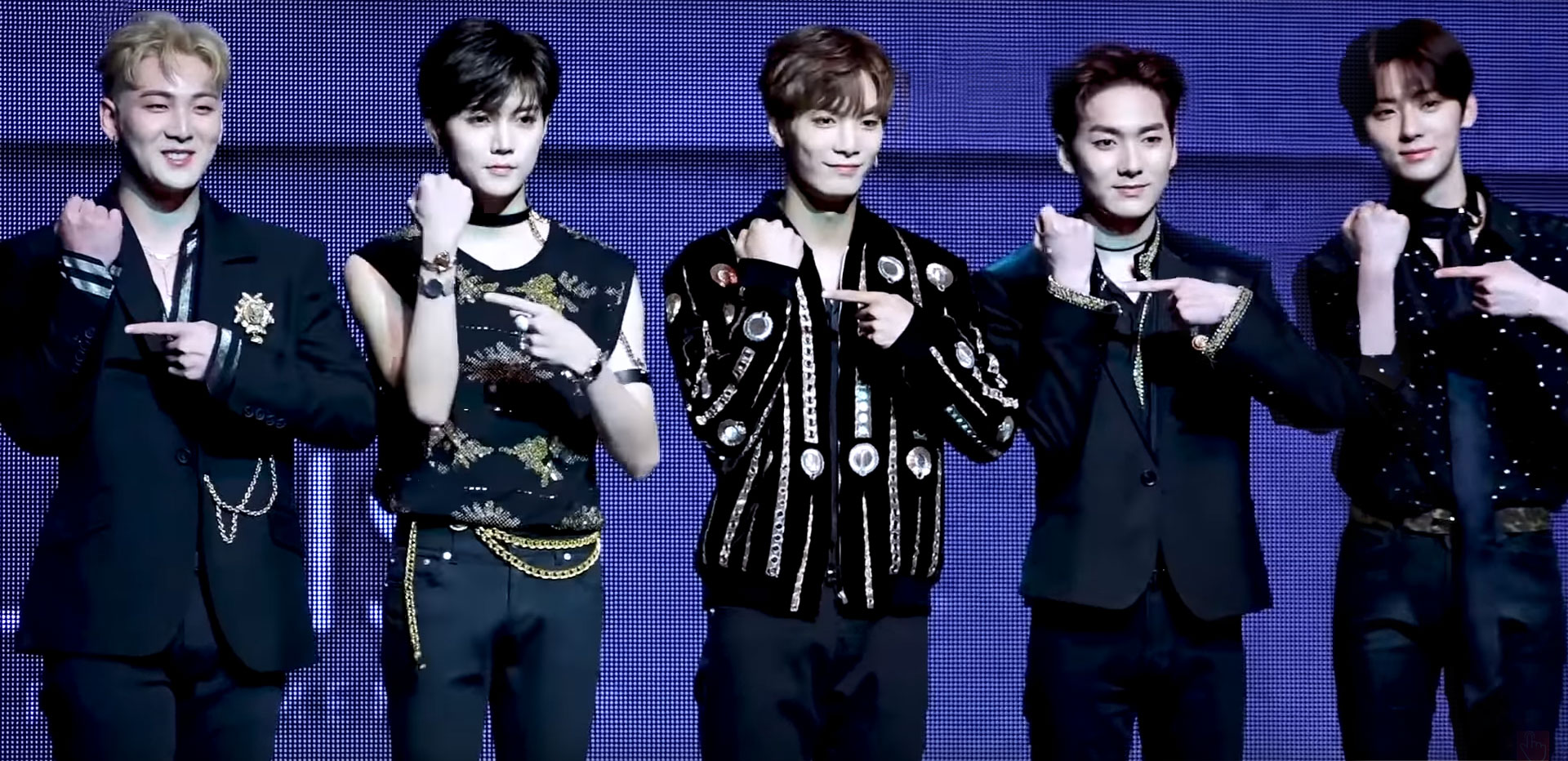
NU'EST received their first Show! Music Core award for "Love Me."

Key
	Highest score in 2019
—	No show was held

Episode	Date	Artist	Song	Points	Ref.
616	January 5	Winner	"Millions"	6,961	
617	January 12	Chungha	"Gotta Go"	7,020	
618	January 19	Chungha	"Gotta Go"	6,795	
619	January 26	GFriend	"Sunrise"	6,698	
620	February 2	Seventeen	"Home"	6,874	
—	February 9	No Show, No chart, winners were not announced			
621	February 16	Chungha	"Gotta Go"	5,668	
622	February 23	Itzy	"Dalla Dalla"	7,164	
623	March 2	Hwasa	"Twit"	7,344	
624	March 9	Itzy	"Dalla Dalla"	6,267	
625	March 16	Hwasa	"Twit"	5,804	
—	March 23	No Show, No chart, winners were not announced			
626	March 30	Mamamoo	"Gogobebe"	7,444	
627	April 6	Taeyeon	"Four Seasons"	7,372	
628	April 13	Chen	"Beautiful Goodbye"	6,732	
629	April 20	BTS	"Boy with Luv"	6,743	
630	April 27	BTS	"Boy with Luv"	10,000	
—	May 4	No Show, No chart, winners were not announced			
631	May 11	BTS	"Boy with Luv"	7,967	
632	May 18	BTS	"Boy with Luv"	8,278	
633	May 25	BTS	"Boy with Luv"	8,830	
634	June 1	BTS	"Boy with Luv"	8,247	
635	June 8	BTS	"Boy with Luv"	7,218	
636	June 15	BTS	"Boy with Luv"	6,902	
637	June 22	BTS	"Boy with Luv"	6,080	
638	June 29	Red Velvet	"Zimzalabim"	6,245	
639	July 6	Chungha	"Snapping"	7,864	
640	July 13	GFriend	"Fever"	6,463	
641	July 20	Baekhyun	"UN Village"	6,773	
642	July 27	No chart, winners were not announced			
643	August 3	No chart, winners were not announced			
644	August 10	Itzy	"Icy"	7,412	
645	August 17	Itzy	"Icy"	6,309	
646	August 24	Itzy	"Icy"	7,175	
647	August 31	Red Velvet	"Umpah Umpah"	8,033	
—	September 7	No Show, No chart, winners were not announced			
648 (Note: Episode 648 was recorded on September 7 and broadcast on September 14.)	September 14	No chart, winners were not announced			
649	September 21	Bolbbalgan4	"Workaholic"	7,175	
650	September 28	Bolbbalgan4	"Workaholic"	6,656	
651 (Note: Episode 651 was recorded on October 5 and broadcast on October 12.)	October 12	No chart, winners were not announced			
652	October 19	No chart, winners were not announced			
653	October 26	AKMU	"How Can I Love the Heartbreak, You're the One I Love"	8,390	
654	November 2	NU'EST	"Love Me"	7,670	
655	November 9	Taeyeon	"Spark"	9,740	
656	November 16	IU	"Love Poem"	8,830	
657	November 23	IU	"Love Poem"	7,194	
—	November 30	No Show, No chart, winners were not announced			
658	December 7	Exo	"Obsession"	8,194	
659	December 14	Exo	"Obsession"	7,549	
660	December 21	IU	"Blueming"	7,312	
661	December 28	No chart, winners were not announced			
