= Purpose (Taeyeon album) =

- Digital and Standard version cover

Studio album by Taeyeon
- Released: October 28, 2019
- Recorded: 2018–2019
- Genres: Pop; R&B; soul; pop rock
- Length: 44:10
- Language: Korean
- Labels: SM; Dreamus

Taeyeon chronology
Voice (2019)	Purpose (2019)	#GirlsSpkOut (2020)

Singles from Purpose
- 1. "Spark" Released: October 28, 2019

The Repackage version cover
- Digital and Purple version cover of Repackage edition artwork

Singles from Purpose (Repackage)
- 1. "Dear Me" Released: January 15, 2020

Purpose is the second studio album by South Korean singer Taeyeon. It was released through SM Entertainment on October 28, 2019. It features 12 tracks, including the Gaon number-one single "Four Seasons" and its B-side "Blue" alongside ten new tracks, including the title track "Spark". On January 15, 2020, a repackage edition of Purpose was released including three new songs, including title track "Dear Me". Musically, it is a pop record that contains influences of ballad, R&B, blues and jazz. The album was originally set to be released on October 22, 2019, but was postponed until October 28 due to the passing of Sulli.

Purpose was met with generally positive reviews from music critics and debuted at number two in South Korea, selling over 154,258 copies. The album received nominations for Disc Bonsang and Disc Daesang at the 34th Golden Disc Awards, while its single "Four Seasons" won Digital Bonsang, and was also nominated for Digital Daesang. Purpose appeared on numerous year-end best music lists of 2019.

== Background and release ==
The album features songs in a "variety of styles". The title is said to represent "Taeyeon's goals as both a person and singer and show how music has become the greatest purpose and direction in [her] life". The digital edition of Purpose contains ten songs, while the physical release includes twelve tracks including the Gaon number-one single "Four Seasons" and its B-side "Blue", which was released as a digital single on March 24, 2019. There are three versions of the physical edition – two regular versions with the same dust cover and either a red or white hard cover book and 1 deluxe edition with a different cover, booklet and packaging style.

== Composition ==
The album incorporates various genres, including K-ballad, R&B, soul, dance, pop rock that are "based on Taeyeon's unique vocals". The title track "Spark" was revealed to be an alternative soul pop song with lyrics rich in beautiful metaphors, showcasing Taeyeon's unparalleled artistic self-image and her vision of moving forward through the vivid metaphor of sparks, expressed through her voice. Meanwhile, "Here I Am" is a melancholy ballad song that characterizes the sensation of feeling trapped in a sense of loss following a breakup, expressed through one's self-image reflected in a mirror, thus eliciting a powerful vocal performance from Taeyeon, along with "Gravity", another pop ballad song featuring an impressive, soulful melody that metaphorically compares constant love to a gravitational force and expresses gratitude towards an unwavering heart.

"Find Me" takes inspiration from rock and blues with its simple modern piano and drums to lead the melody, while conveying the meaning of spreading one’s wings and flying into the sky carrying a wish to go towards the radiant sun, signifying a passion to go beyond one’s limits without stopping and "City Love" is an emotional R&B retro song that combines city pop sounds with a soft guitar, its lyrics containing the feeling of excitement of spending special days meeting the sparkly love of your life in an ordinary city.

"Do You Love Me" is a jazz-based ballad song that combines musical instruments and vintage string sounds reminiscent of a jazz club, starting with a piano and a confessing voice about a hidden love, while "Better Babe" is a blues-rock track that articulates the sorrow and anguish following a break-up, with Taeyeon's soulful voice conveying emotion initially, building up to a powerful crescendo by the chorus. "Love You Like Crazy" was described as an alternative rock and soul-influenced song that expresses the strong feelings of love, "LOL" is an alternative R&B-based electropop centered around the theme of seducing someone who struggles with self-expression and embarrassment, thereby facilitating an easier closeness between them and "Wine" is a sentimental R&B pop genre song that compares the enduring faith and affection for an old lover to wine, which gains value over time, symbolizing a love that grows more beautiful as time passes.

Three new songs added to the reissue album are "Dear Me", "My Tragedy" and "Drawing Our Moments". The title track "Dear Me" is an emotional ballad song with the harmony of an acoustic and string melody, delivering a comforting ballad with a positive message urging self-belief and self-love. "My Tragedy" is a trip hop that starts with the sound of a reed organ, leads to an orchestral arrangement, and symbolically depicts the profound sorrow of a shattered love by likening it to a lunar eclipse in its lyrics. "Drawing Our Moments" is a ballad song that unfolds like a fairy tale with delicate performances of acoustic folk guitars with a pretty flute-like instrument and a piano carrying the song alongside Taeyeon's emotive voice, while its lyrics capture the dazzling moments found within the ordinary routines shared with a loved one.

== Critical reception ==
Professional ratings
Review scores
Source	Rating
Idology	(positive)
IZM	3.5/5 stars
Music Y	(positive)
The Star	9/10

Purpose received generally positive reviews from media outlets. Chester Chin from The Star lauded the album's musical styles with "the artistic confidence on Purpose feels intensely liberating, and it is one heck of a confident record – in soul, sentiment and sound" and "On Purpose, the Girls' Generation alumni delivers a larger-than-life performance on a deliciously darker and much more musically complex record". He additionally complimented on Taeyeon's vocals and labelled Purpose as "artistic clarity" follow-up to her previous studio album My Voice. Idology Korea ranked it the eighth best K-pop album of 2019.

Purpose received nominations for Album Bonsang (Main Prize) at the 34th Golden Disc Awards and Best Pop Album at the 2020 Korean Music Awards.

== Commercial performance ==
Within just a few hours of its release, "Purpose" took over iTunes charts in 22 regions. She had set a record taking over the number one spot on iTunes charts in most countries for a Korean female soloist. She broke her own record by landing on the top spot in 26 countries with Repackaged version, after being surpassed by Wendy's Like Water. In South Korea, Purpose debuted at number two on the Gaon Album Chart with 154,258 copies sold. The album became Taeyeon's sixth top ten album in the country, and broke the record for the largest first day sales for a female artist with 78,327 copies on Hanteo being hit days later by IU's Love Poem. In Japan, the album debuted at number twenty-five on the Oricon Albums Chart and has sold over 3,000 copies as of October 2019. Purpose debuted at number nine the Billboard World Albums, becoming Taeyeon's fifth top 10 entry on the chart. It additionally charted at number 14 on the Top Heatseekers.

== Promotion ==
On October 14, 2019, Taeyeon released teaser photos for the album featuring a "red-lit aesthetic" of her face and shoulders, which was called "sultry" by Gulf News. SM originally set the release date of the album on October 22, 2019, but the promotional schedule was temporarily halted due to the death of Sulli. The first teaser of the music video for the title track 'Spark' was released on the official SM Entertainment YouTube channel on October 23, while the second teaser of the music video was released on October 25, 2019. The music video of 'Spark' was released on October 28, 2019, which was released simultaneously with the release of the album.

Taeyeon did not appear on any music shows and or engage in any promotion for Purpose (except for fansign events) as she decided to pay respects to her late friend Sulli, and also to take care of her mental health. On January 13, 2020, a teaser of the music video for the title track "Dear Me" was released on the official SM Entertainment YouTube channel, while the music video was released on January 15, 2020, which was released simultaneously with the release of the Purpose repackage.

== Track listing ==
Credits adapted from Naver

Purpose – Digital standard edition
No.	Title	Lyrics	Music	Arrangement	Length
1.	"Here I Am"	Jo Yoon-kyung	Matthew Tishler; Allison Kaplan	Matthew Tishler	3:24
2.	"Spark" (불티; Bulti)	Kenzie	Kenzie; Anne Judith Stokke Wik; Ronny Svendsen	Kenzie; Anne Judith Stokke Wik; Ronny Svendsen	3:37
3.	"Find Me"	Moon Hye-min	Mike Daley; Mitchell Owens; Bianca Atterberry	Mike Daley; Mitchell Owens	4:07
4.	"Love You Like Crazy"	Kenzie	Kenzie; LDN Noise	Kenzie; LDN Noise	2:59
5.	"LOL" (하하하; Hahaha)	Jung Min-seung (ron); Kang Eun-jung	dress; glowingdog (Munhwain); Song Shi-jin (Kriz); Shinae An Wheeler	dress; glowingdog (Munhwain	3:16
6.	"Better Babe"	Kim Boo-min	Hitchhiker; Luke "Lukr" Foley (Combustion Music); Dan "DWhit" Whittemore; Allison Victoria Pincsak	Hitchhiker	4:11
7.	"Wine"	Jo Yoon-kyung	Robin Ghosh; Krysta Youngs; Kim Viera; David "DQ" Quiñones	Robin Ghosh	3:57
8.	"Do You Love Me?"	Lee Joo-hyoung (MonoTree)	Lee Joo-hyoung (MonoTree)	Lee Joo-hyoung (MonoTree)	4:08
9.	"City Love"	Ji Yu-ri	Mike Daley; Mitchell Owens; Micky Blue; Realmeee	Mike Daley; Mitchell Owens	3:38
10.	"Gravity"	JQ (Makeumine Works); Moon Ye-rin (Makeumine Works)	Lance Shipp (LIONCHLD); Rachael Kennedy (LIONCHLD); Nathalia Marshall (LIONCHLD); Angel Lopez (Mono Music Group); Gilde Flores (Mono Music Group)	LIONCHLD; Mono Music Group	3:59
Total length:					37:26

Purpose – Korean and deluxe bonus tracks
No.	Title	Lyrics	Music	Arrangement	Length
11.	"Blue"	JQ (Makeumine Works); Hyun Ji-won (Makeumine Works)	Alex Mood (Mr Radar); Mariella "Bambi" Garcia Balandina (Mr Radar); Oskar Salhin; Mimmi Gyltman; Rassmus "Raise" Björnson	Mr Radar; Rassmus "Raise" Björnson	3:32
12.	"Four Seasons" (사계; Sagye)	Kenzie	Josh Cumbee (Nonfiction); Afshin Salmani (Nonfiction); Andrew Allen; Kenzie	Kenzie; Nonfiction	3:08
Total length:					44:10

Purpose – Repackage
No.	Title	Lyrics	Music	Arrangement	Length
1.	"Dear Me" (내게 들려주고 싶은 말; Naege deullyeojugo sipeun mal; 'What I Want To Tell Myself')	Hwang Yoo-ra; Yoo Ji-won (lalala Studio)	William Wenaus; Yoo Young-jin	William Wenaus; Yoo Young-jin	3:42
2.	"My Tragedy" (월식; Wolsik; 'Lunar Eclipse')	Kim Boo-min	Hitchhiker; Dan "DWhit" Whittemore; Bonx; Elizabeth Russo	Hitchhiker	4:29
3.	"Here I Am"	Jo Yoon-kyung	Matthew Tishler; Allison Kaplan	Matthew Tishler	3:24
4.	"Spark" (불티)	Kenzie	Kenzie; Anne Juddith Stokke Wik; Ronny Svendsen	Kenzie; Anne Juddith Stokke Wik; Ronny Svendsen	3:37
5.	"Find Me"	Moon Hye-min	Mike Daley; Mitchell Owens; Bianca Atterberry	Mike Daley; Mitchell Owens	4:07
6.	"Love You Like Crazy"	Kenzie	Kenzie; LDN Noise	Kenzie; LDN Noise	2:59
7.	"LOL" (하하하)	Jung Min-seung (ron); Kang Eun-jung	dress; glowingdog (Munhwain); Song Shi-jin (Kriz); Shinae An Wheeler	dress; glowingdog (Munhwain	3:16
8.	"Better Babe"	Kim Boo-min	Hitchhiker; Luke "Lukr" Foley (Combustion Music); Dan "DWhit" Whittemore; Allison Victoria Pincsak	Hitchhiker	4:11
9.	"Wine"	Jo Yoon-kyung	Robin Ghosh; Krysta Youngs; Kim Viera; David "DQ" Quiñones	Robin Ghosh	3:57
10.	"Do You Love Me?"	Lee Joo-hyoung (MonoTree)	Lee Joo-hyoung (MonoTree)	Lee Joo-hyoung (MonoTree)	4:08
11.	"City Love"	Ji Yu-ri	Mike Daley; Mitchell Owens; Micky Blue; Realmeee	Mike Daley; Mitchell Owens	3:38
12.	"Gravity"	JQ (Makeumine Works); Moon Ye-rin (Makeumine Works)	Lance Shipp (LIONCHLD); Rachael Kennedy (LIONCHLD); Nathalia Marshall (LIONCHLD); Angel Lopez (Mono Music Group); Gilde Flores (Mono Music Group)	LIONCHLD; Mono Music Group	3:59
13.	"Drawing Our Moments" (너를 그리는 시간; Neoreul geurineun sigan)	Jo Yoon-kyung	Lawrence Lee; Malin Johansson (Songs of Sweden); Dan Sundquist; Hjalmar Wilén	Lawrence Lee	4:33
14.	"Blue"	JQ (Makeumine Works); Hyun Ji-won (Makeumine Works)	Alex Mood (Mr Radar); Mariella "Bambi" Garcia Balandina (Mr Radar); Oskar Salhin; Mimmi Gyltman; Rassmus "Raise" Björnson	Mr Radar; Rassmus "Raise" Björnson	3:32
15.	"Four Seasons" (사계)	Kenzie	Josh Cumbee (Nonfiction); Afshin Salmani (Nonfiction); Andrew Allen; Kenzie	Kenzie; Nonfiction	3:08
16.	"Dear Me [Instrumental]" (Digital Bonus Track)		William Wenaus; Yoo Young-jin	William Wenaus; Yoo Young-jin	3:42
Total length:					60:37

== Charts ==
=== Weekly charts ===
Chart (2019–2020)	Peak position
Australian Digital Albums (ARIA)	23
French Digital Albums (SNEP)	73
Japanese Albums (Oricon)	25
Japanese Hot Albums (Billboard Japan)	19
South Korean Albums (Gaon)	2
South Korean Albums (Gaon) (Kihno ver.)	7
UK Album Downloads (Official Charts)	79
US Heatseekers Albums (Billboard)	14
US Independent Albums (Billboard)	41
US World Albums (Billboard)	9

=== Monthly charts ===
Chart (2019–2020)	Peak position
South Korean Albums (Gaon)	6
South Korean Albums (Gaon)	5 (Note: Repackage)
South Korean Albums (Gaon)	45 (Note: Kit)

=== Year-end charts ===
Chart (2019)	Position
South Korean Albums (Gaon)	34

== Sales ==
Region	Sales amount
South Korea	172,000
South Korea (repackage)	60,000

== Release history ==
Region	Date	Format	Version	Label	Ref.
Various	October 28, 2019	CD; digital download; streaming	Original	SM Entertainment	
Various	January 15, 2020	CD; digital download; streaming	Repackage	SM Entertainment	
South Korea	January 22, 2020	Kihno	Repackage	SM Entertainment; Dreamus	
