= Love U =

2018 single by Chung Ha

Single by Chung Ha

from the EP Blooming Blue
- Released: July 18, 2018
- Recorded: 2018
- Genre: K-pop; tropical house; dance
- Length: 3:10
- Label: MNH; Stone Music
- Songwriter: Oreo
- Producer: Oreo

Chung Ha singles chronology
| "My Paradise" (2018) | "Love U" (2018) | "Wow Thing" (2018) |

Music video
- "Love U (MNH)" on YouTube "Love U (Stone)" on YouTube

"Love U" is a song by South Korean singer Chung Ha, serving as the lead single of her third EP, Blooming Blue.

== Charts ==
=== Weekly charts ===
| Chart (2018) | Peak position |
|---|---|
| South Korea (Gaon) | 8 |
| South Korea (Kpop Hot 100) | 8 |

=== Year-end charts ===
| Chart (2018) | Peak position |
|---|---|
| South Korea (Gaon) | 100 |

== Accolades ==
Awards and nominations
| Year | Organization | Category | Result | Ref. |
|---|---|---|---|---|
| 2018 | 3rd Asia Artist Awards | AAA Favorite Award (Note: Nominated along with "Roller Coaster") | Won | |
