= Spark (Taeyeon song) =

2019 single by Taeyeon

Single by Taeyeon

from the album Purpose
- Released: October 28, 2019
- Genre: Alternative pop; soul
- Length: 3:37
- Label: SM
- Composers: Kenzie; Anne Judith Wik; Ronny Svendsen
- Lyricist: Kenzie

Taeyeon singles chronology
"All About You" (2019)	"Spark" (2019)	"Into The Unknown" (2019)

Music video
- "Spark" on YouTube

"Spark" (Korean: 불티; RR: Bulti) is a song recorded by South Korean singer Taeyeon for her second studio album Purpose. It was released on October 28, 2019, as the album's lead single by SM Entertainment on October 28, 2019. The song was written by Kenzie, and composed by Kenzie, Anne Judith Wik and Ronny Svendsen. It was described as an alternative soul pop song incorporating intense melody with emotions and Taeyeon's overwhelming vocals and the lyrics contains various metaphors that expresses her identity.

The song debuted at number two on the Gaon Digital Chart. The song additionally charted at number 25 on the Billboard World Digital Songs and debuted at number two on Billboard K-pop Hot 100.

== Background ==
On October 10, 2019, Taeyeon's agency SM Entertainment announced that her second full-length studio album would be released in the end of October. The album's title is Purpose, while the lead single was announced to be "Spark", which was released simultaneously with the release of the album.

== Reception ==
Lim Dong-yeob and Hwang Seon-up from IZM praised Taeyeon's vocals on the song and compared its musical styles to those of English singer Adele in "Rolling in the Deep", American band OneRepublic in "Counting Stars" and Scottish singer Emeli Sandé in "Hurts".

"Spark" debuted at number two on the Gaon Digital Chart for the week ending November 7, 2019. Within its first week of release, the single sold 47,032,838 digital index points through South Korean digital music services. It peaked at number one on the Gaon Download Chart. The song additionally debuted at number 25 on the Billboard World Digital Songs and debuted at number two on Billboard K-pop Hot 100.

== Charts ==
=== Weekly charts ===
Chart	Peak position
South Korea (Gaon)	2
South Korea (K-pop Hot 100)	2
US World Digital Songs (Billboard)	25

=== Monthly charts ===
Chart (2019)	Position
South Korea (Gaon)	6

=== Year-end charts ===
Chart (2019)	Position
South Korea (Gaon)	134
Chart (2020)	Position
South Korea (Gaon)	140

== Sales ==
Region	Sales
China	111,745

== Awards and nominations ==
Year	Award	Category	Result
2020	9th Gaon Chart Music Awards	Song of the Year – October	Nominated
2020	22nd Mnet Asian Music Awards	Best Vocal Performance — Solo	Nominated
2020	22nd Mnet Asian Music Awards	Song of the Year	Nominated

=== Music program awards ===
Program	Date
Music Bank (KBS)	November 8, 2019
Show! Music Core (MBC)	November 9, 2019
Inkigayo (SBS)	November 10, 2019

== Credits and personnel ==
Credits are adapted from the CD booklet of Purpose and Purpose (Repackage).

Studio

- SM Blue Cup Studio – recording
- Prelude Studio – recording
- SM Big Shot Studio – digital editing, engineered for mix
- SM Concert Hall Studio – mixing
- The Mastering Palace – mastering

Personnel

- SM Entertainment – executive producer
- Lee Soo-man – producer
- Yoo Young-jin – music and sound supervisor
- Taeyeon – vocals, background vocals
- Kenzie – lyrics, composition, arrangement, vocal directing, background vocals
- Anne Judith Wik – composition, arrangement, background vocals
- Ronny Svendsen – composition, arrangement
- Hong Jun-ho – guitar
- Jung Eui-seok – recording
- Lee Chang-sun – recording
- Lee Min-kyu – digital editing, engineered for mix
- Nam Koong-jin – mixing
- Dave Kutch – mastering

== See also ==
- List of Inkigayo Chart winners (2019)
- List of Music Bank Chart winners (2019)
- List of Show! Music Core Chart winners (2019)
