= Snapping (song) =

2019 single by Chung Ha

Single by Chung Ha

from the EP Flourishing
- Released: June 24, 2019
- Recorded: 2019
- Genre: K-pop; Dance
- Length: 3:34
- Label: MNH; Stone Music
- Songwriters: Park Woo-sang; Sola
- Producer: Park Woo-sang

Chung Ha singles chronology
"Gotta Go" (2019)	"Snapping" (2019)	"Run" (2019)

Music video
- "Snapping (MNH)" on YouTube "Snapping (Stone)" on YouTube

"Snapping" is a song by South Korean singer Chung Ha released on June 24, 2019, by MNH Entertainment, Stone Music Entertainment. The track acts as the title track for her Korean fourth extended play Flourishing, which was released simultaneously with the single. As of February 2021, it has over 75 million views on YouTube and 80 million streams on Spotify. "Snapping" placed first on the music show, Show Champion on July 3, 2019.

== Background and composition ==
It was announced in June that Chung Ha will be making her third summer comeback. Music and photo teasers were released weeks before the official released of the single.

"Snapping" was written by Park Woo-sang. "Snapping" is a Latin-inspired pop song with an intense, seductive number that diverges from Chung Ha's previous summer singles such as "Love You", a track of "Blooming Blue", dropped in July last year. The lyrics talk about the uncomfortable end of a relationship. Like a magic spell, the snap of a finger is what you need to empty your mind and welcome another new day.

== Music video and promotion ==
The music video was released alongside the album and song on June 24, 2019. The music video includes a creation of seductive and tantalizing with dynamic choreography and bright block-colored cinematography. It was directed by Rima Yoon and Dongju Jang. "Snapping" had its debut showcase on the day of the release, in Sogang University.

== Accolades ==
Year-end lists
Critic/Publication	List	Rank	Ref.
Dazed	The 20 best K-pop songs of 2019	10	

Awards and nominations
Year	Award	Category	Result	Ref.
2020	Gaon Chart Music Awards	Song of the Year (June)	Nominated	

Music program awards (6 total)
Program	Date	Ref.
Show Champion	July 3, 2019	
M Countdown	July 4, 2019	
M Countdown	July 18, 2019	
Music Bank	July 5, 2019	
Show! Music Core	July 6, 2019	
Inkigayo	July 7, 2019	

== Chart performance ==
=== Weekly charts ===
Chart (2019)	Peak position
Singapore (RIAS)	21
South Korea (Gaon)	2
South Korea (K-pop Hot 100)	3
US World Digital Songs (Billboard)	9

=== Year-end charts ===
Chart (2019)	Position
South Korea (Gaon)	67

== Release history ==
Region	Date	Format	Label
Various	June 24, 2019	Digital download; streaming	MNH Entertainment; Stone Music Entertainment

== See also ==
- List of Inkigayo Chart winners (2019)
- List of M Countdown Chart winners (2019)
