= Dear Me (Taeyeon song) =

Single by Taeyeon

from the album Purpose (Repackage)
- Released: January 15, 2020
- Genre: Pop ballad
- Length: 3:44
- Label: SM
- Composers: William Wenaus; Yoo Young-jin
- Lyricists: Hwang Yu-ra; Yoo Ji-won

Taeyeon singles chronology
"I Do" (2019)	"Dear Me" (2020)	"Happy" (2020)

Music video
- "Dear Me" on YouTube

"Dear Me" (Korean: 내게 들려주고 싶은 말; RR: Naege deullyeojugo sipeun mal; lit. 'What You Want To Tell Me') is a song recorded by South Korean singer Taeyeon for the re-release of her second studio album Purpose (2019). It was released on January 15, 2020, as the lead single for the repackage version of the album by SM Entertainment. The song's lyrics were penned by Hwang Yu-ra (Jam Factory) and Yoo Ji-won (Lara Las Studios), while its music was composed by William Wenaus and Yoo Young-jin. Musically, "Dear Me" is a ballad featuring guitar, strings and Taeyeon's sentimental vocals.

== Background ==
On January 7, 2020, Taeyeon's agency SM Entertainment announced that her second full-length studio album would be re-released on January 15, 2020, while the third single was announced to be "Dear Me", which was released simultaneously with the release of the album. The song was described as a ballad song with the harmony of an acoustic guitar and string melody, combined with Taeyeon's emotional voice. Its lyrics that give warm comfort with a positive message to believe & love yourself more.

== Chart performance ==
"Dear Me" debuted at number twenty on South Korea's Gaon Digital Chart for the chart issue dated January 12–18, 2020, becoming the singer's 36th top 20 single on the chart. The song also reached the sixteen position on the Billboard K-Pop Hot 100.

== Credits and personnel ==
Credits are adapted from the CD booklet of Purpose (Repackage).

Studio

- SM Yellow Tail Studio – recording, digital editing
- MonoTree Studio – recording, Pro Tools operating, digital editing
- SM Booming System – engineered for mix, mixing
- Sonic Korea – mastering

Personnel

- SM Entertainment – executive producer
- Lee Soo-man – producer
- Taeyeon – vocals, background vocals
- Hwang Yoo-ra (Jam Factory) – lyrics
- Yoo Ji-won (Lalala Studio) – lyrics
- William Wenaus – composition, arrangement
- Yoo Young-jin – composition, arrangement, engineered for mix, mixing, music and sound supervisor
- Lee Joo-hyung – vocal directing, Pro Tools operating
- Park Joo-yeon – background vocals
- Lee Min-kyu – recording, digital editing
- Kang Sun-young – recording, digital editing
- Jeon Hoon – mastering

== Charts ==
=== Weekly charts ===
Chart (2020)	Peak position
South Korea (Gaon)	20
South Korea (K-pop Hot 100)	16

=== Monthly charts ===
Chart (2020)	Peak position
South Korean (Gaon)	55

== Awards and nominations ==
Year	Awards	Category	Result
2021	Gaon Chart K-Pop Awards	Song of the Year – January	Nominated
