= Dalla Dalla =

2019 debut single by Itzy

Single by Itzy

from the album It'z Different
- Released: February 12, 2019
- Recorded: 2018–2019
- Genre: K-pop; EDM; electropop; house
- Length: 3:19
- Label: JYP
- Songwriters: Galactika; Athena

Itzy singles chronology
"Dalla Dalla" (2019)	"Icy" (2019)

Music video
- "Dalla Dalla" on YouTube

"Dalla Dalla" (Korean: 달라달라; lit. 'Different Different') is the debut single by South Korean girl group Itzy. It was released on February 12, 2019, through JYP Entertainment as the lead single from their debut single album It'z Different. The song was written and composed by the production team Galactika. It blends elements of EDM, hip hop, electropop, and house, with lyrics that explore themes of individuality, empowerment, and self-confidence.

Upon its release, the song received mixed reviews from music critics, who compared its concept and style to those of other K-pop girl groups. However, Itzy's energetic performances were widely praised, contributing to their early recognition. "Dalla Dalla" peaked at number two on both the Gaon Digital Chart and the Billboard K-pop Hot 100. Nine months after its release, the song was certified platinum by the Korea Music Content Association (KMCA) for surpassing 100 million streams.

The music video became the most-viewed debut music video by a K-pop group within 24 hours at the time, accumulating 17.1 million views. Itzy promoted the track on several South Korean music programs, including M Countdown, Music Bank, Show! Music Core, Inkigayo, and Show Champion, winning nine first-place trophies.

== Background and release ==
On January 14, 2019, it was reported that JYP Entertainment had completed filming the music video for their upcoming girl group. On January 21, the agency released a video titled "PROLOGUE FILM: ITZY", revealing the group's name and introducing its members. On February 1, a teaser for the music video was released, revealing "Dalla Dalla" as the title of their debut single. The music video was pre-released on February 11 at midnight Korea Standard Time (KST), while the song was officially released for digital download and streaming on February 12 at 18:00 KST, as the lead single from their debut single album It'z Different.

A remix version of "Dalla Dalla" was later included on the group's debut extended play (EP), It'z Icy, released on July 29, 2019. On January 22, 2021, Itzy released their first English-language EP, Not Shy (English ver.), which features the English version of "Dalla Dalla". Their first compilation album, It'z Itzy, released on December 22, 2021, includes both the Korean and Japanese versions of "Dalla Dalla", with the Japanese lyrics written by D&H and Yohei.

== Composition ==
"Dalla Dalla"
A 20-second sample of "Dalla Dalla", which incorporates heavy bass and light drum hit instrumentations over an electropop melody.

"Dalla Dalla" was written and composed by the production team Galactika (별들의전쟁). The song is described as a lively and upbeat "fusion groove" that blends elements of popular genres, including EDM, hip hop, electropop and house. The members of Itzy described the track as "hard to define, but all the more lovable because of that." The song lyrically emphasizes themes of confidence, self-love, and empowerment. The title "Dalla" (달라), meaning "different" in Korean, is reflected in the lyrics: "I'm different from other kids. Don't try to measure me by your standard... I love myself, I'm somewhat different, yeah. I'm different from you."

== Critical reception ==
Professional ratings
Review scores
Source	Rating
IZM	2.5/5 stars

"Dalla Dalla" initially received mixed reviews from music critics. Tamar Herman of Billboard described it as an "empowering anthem" that introduces Itzy as a group distinct from its peers, calling it "feisty and quick to shift tempos and genres," with standout "hip-hop breakdowns" throughout. Jeong Yeon-kyung of IZM's wrote that the song borrows a "ratchet style" dance beat reminiscent of YG's style, while its electronic sounds evoke the personalities of Red Velvet and F(x). She also noted that it follows JYP's "old-fashioned 'I'm different' narrative," similar to Miss A's "I Don't Need a Man," and features a "Gapbunpong" (a sudden shift in mood) chorus.

Writing for Kotaku, Seung Park described the track as an "eclectic mashup" that combines a more mature take on Red Velvet's esoteric work with the hip-hop aesthetics of Blackpink and 2NE1's. He added that the song serves as a "solid opening bell" for what is shaping up to be a promising career for the group.

Taylor Glasby from Dazed ranked "Dalla Dalla" eighth on the magazine's list of the best K-pop songs of 2019, writing that it evokes two outlandish 90s moments: the wobbly bass of "Flat Beat" and the brat-pop of "Trouble". She added, "Like the latter, "Dalla Dalla" owes more to its artists' personalities, and despite several coats of K-pop polish, embodies that same scrappy energy and ballsy confidence."

In 2020, the lyrics from "Dalla Dalla" were featured in the exhibition "Korean Pop Lyrics: Melodies of Life" at the National Hangeul Museum in Seoul.

"Dalla Dalla" on year-end lists
Publication	List	Rank	Ref.
Billboard	The 25 Best K-pop Songs of 2019	20	
BuzzFeed	Best K-pop Music Videos of 2019	18	
Dazed	The 20 best K-pop songs of 2019	8	
Refinery29	The Best K-Pop Songs of 2019	26	
South China Morning Post	The 10 best K-pop songs of 2019	8	

== Awards ==
"Dalla Dalla" amassed a total of nine wins across various music programs, including a "triple crown" (three wins) on Inkigayo. Itzy also received the Digital Bonsang award at the 34th Golden Disc Awards in recognition of the song's success on digital platforms in South Korea.

Awards and nominations for "Dalla Dalla"
Year	Award	Category	Result	Ref.
2019	Melon Music Awards	Song of the Year	Longlisted	
2019	Melon Music Awards	Best Dance – Female	Nominated	
2020	Gaon Chart Music Awards	Artist of the Year – Digital Music (February)	Nominated	
2020	Golden Disc Awards	Best Digital Song (Bonsang)	Won	
2020	Golden Disc Awards	Song of the Year (Daesang)	Nominated	
2020	Korean Music Awards	Best Pop Song	Nominated	

Music program awards for "Dalla Dalla"
Program	Date	Ref.
M Countdown	February 21, 2019	
M Countdown	March 7, 2019	
Show! Music Core	February 23, 2019	
Show! Music Core	March 9, 2019	
Inkigayo	February 24, 2019	
Inkigayo	March 3, 2019	
Inkigayo	March 10, 2019	
Music Bank	March 8, 2019	
Music Bank	March 15, 2019	

== Commercial performance ==
"Dalla Dalla" was a commercial success in South Korea, debuting at number five on the Gaon Digital Chart for the week ending February 16, 2019. After three weeks, it rose to number two on the chart for the week ending March 9. The song also peaked at number two on Billboard's K-pop Hot 100 on March 16. It ranked sixth on Gaon's mid-year Digital chart. On November 7, "Dalla Dalla" was certified platinum by the Korea Music Content Association (KMCA) for surpassing 100 million streams . It finished 2019 as the 11th highest-ranking song on Gaon's year-end Digital Chart, making it the highest-charting girl group song and the second best-performing group song of the year in South Korea. Internationally, "Dalla Dalla" peaked at number two on Billboard's World Digital Song Sales chart in the United States, number 20 on the RMNZ Hot Singles chart in New Zealand, and number 31 on the Billboard Japan Hot 100.

== Music video and promotion ==
The music video for "Dalla Dalla", directed by Naive Creative Production was pre-released on JYP Entertainment's official YouTube channel on February 11, 2019. Emlyn Travis of BuzzFeed ranked it 18th on their year-end list of the 30 best K-pop music videos, describing it as "an explosion of rainbows and self-confidence." Yoon So-yeon of Korea JoongAng Daily commented that the music video has powerful, feminine vibes comparable to those of K-pop girl groups Blackpink and 4Minute. K-Pop Herald's Hong Dam-young highlighted Itzy's efforts to stand out, noting the video's vibrant and "badass vibes".

The music video set a record as the most-viewed debut music video by a K-pop group within 24 hours, accumulating 17.1 million views. It also became the fastest K-pop debut music video to reach 100 million views, and was ranked the second most popular music video of 2019 on YouTube in South Korea.

To commemorate their debut, Itzy held a live broadcast titled "The 1st Single Live Premiere" on V Live, where they performed the full "Dalla Dalla" choreography for the first time. The group promoted the song throughout February 2019 on multiple South Korean music programs, including M Countdown, Music Bank, Show! Music Core, Inkigayo, and Show Champion, throughout February 2019.

== Credits and personnel ==
Credits adapted from NetEase Music.

- Itzy — primary vocals
- Galactika (Note: South Korean music production group.) — lyricists, composers, arrangers, background vocals recording
  - Athena — composer, keyboards
  - FRIDAY. — background vocals
  - Chang — drums
- e.NA — background vocals
- Jeong Yoo-ra — digital editing
- Honzo — digital editing
- Eom Se-hee — recording, assistant mixer
- Kang Yeon-nu — recording
- Lee Tae-seop — mixer
- Chris Gehringer — mastering

== Charts ==
=== Weekly charts ===
Weekly chart performance for "Dalla Dalla"
Chart (2019)	Peak position
Japan (Japan Hot 100)	31
Japan Digital Singles (Oricon)	47
Japan Streaming (Oricon)	14
Malaysia (RIM)	8
New Zealand Hot Singles (RMNZ)	20
Singapore (RIAS)	3
South Korea (Gaon)	2
South Korea (K-pop Hot 100)	2
US World Digital Songs (Billboard)	2

=== Monthly charts ===
Monthly chart performance for "Dalla Dalla"
Chart (2019)	Position
South Korea (Gaon)	3

=== Year-end charts ===
Year-end chart performance for "Dalla Dalla"
Chart (2019)	Position
South Korea (Gaon)	11
Chart (2020)	Position
South Korea (Gaon)	186

== Certifications ==
Region	Certification	Certified units/sales
Streaming
South Korea (KMCA)	Platinum	100,000,000^{†}
Japan (RIAJ)	Silver	30,000,000^{†}
^{†} Streaming-only figures based on certification alone.

== Release history ==
Release history and formats for "Dalla Dalla"
Region	Date	Format	Label	Ref.
South Korea	February 12, 2019	Digital download; streaming	JYP Entertainment	
Various	February 14, 2019	Digital download; streaming	JYP Entertainment	

== See also ==
- List of certified songs in South Korea
- List of Inkigayo Chart winners (2019)
- List of M Countdown Chart winners (2019)
- List of Music Bank Chart winners (2019)
- List of Show! Music Core Chart winners (2019)
