= Four Seasons (song) =

2019 single by Taeyeon

Single by Taeyeon
- B-side: "Blue"
- Released: March 24, 2019
- Recorded: 2019
- Studio: SM Big Shot (Seoul); Seoul; Prelude (Seoul)
- Genre: Pop; reggae
- Length: 3:32
- Label: SM; Dreamus
- Composers: Kenzie; Josh Cumbee; AFSHeeN; Andrew Allen
- Lyricist: Kenzie

Taeyeon singles chronology
"Page 0" (2018)	"Four Seasons" (2019)	"Angel" (2019)

Music video
- "Four Seasons" on YouTube

"Four Seasons" (Korean: 사계; RR: Sagye) is a song recorded by South Korean singer Taeyeon. Written by Kenzie, who also co-composed the song with AFSHeeN, Andrew Allen and Josh Cumbee, the reggae-tinged ballad was released as a digital single on March 24, 2019, by SM Entertainment and Dreamus, with an accompanying music video released two days prior to its digital release. Initially a standalone single, both the song and the B-side track "Blue" were later included as bonus tracks in the Korean release of Taeyeon's second album Purpose, released on October 28.

Upon its release, "Four Seasons" received positive reviews from music critics for solidifying the singer's growth as a "full-time" vocalist. The song achieved great commercial success, earning Taeyeon her fifth chart-topper as a lead artist (sixth overall) on the Gaon Digital Chart for two weeks and to date, her longest charting performance on the chart. It eventually became her first single to receive a Platinum certificate by KMCA for achieving over 100,000,000 streaming units in November 2019, only six months after its release. The singer eventually promoted both songs during her concert "’s…one" on March 28. It won the Digital Daesang award at the 29th Seoul Music Awards in January 2020.

== Background and release ==
On March 17, 2019, Taeyeon was announced to be releasing a digital single titled "Four Seasons" with its b-side track "Blue". The song is described as a ballad with an instrumental structure that is centered on acoustic guitars. It compares the ups and downs of love to the four seasons. While the B-side track "Blue" is a ballad song with Taeyeon's affectionate vocals and lyrics that capture the double meaning of 'blue' (푸른) and 'gloomy/feeling blue' (우울한) and the longing for an old lover and feelings after a break-up. The music video for "Four Seasons" was released on March 22, two day before the single album. Taeyeon later filmed a live performance of the song from her concert "’s…one", which was released on March 28.

== Chart performance ==
Professional ratings
Review scores
Source	Rating
Music Y	3/5 stars
IZM	3/5 stars

"Four Seasons" debuted at number one on South Korea's Gaon Digital Chart for the chart issue dated March 24–30, 2019. It was the best-performing single of March 2019 on the Gaon Digital Chart. It claimed the number one spot on the Billboard K-Pop Hot 100 for two consecutive weeks and reached number 6 on the Billboard World Digital Songs chart.

== Accolades ==
Awards and nominations
Year	Award	Category	Result	Ref.
2019	Melon Music Awards	Best Ballad	Won	
2019	Mnet Asian Music Awards	Best Vocal Performance – Solo	Won	
2019	Mnet Asian Music Awards	Song of the Year	Nominated	
2020	Gaon Chart Music Awards	Song of the Year – March	Won	
2020	Golden Disc Awards	Digital Daesang	Nominated	
2020	Golden Disc Awards	Digital Bonsang	Won	
2020	Seoul Music Awards	Digital Daesang	Won	

Music program awards
Program	Date	Ref.
Show! Music Core	April 6, 2019	
Inkigayo	April 7, 2019	

Melon Popularity Award
Award	Date (2019)	Ref.
Weekly Popularity Award	April 1	
Weekly Popularity Award	April 8	

== Track listing ==
Digital download
No.	Title	Lyrics	Music	Arrangement	Length
1.	"Blue"	Hyun Ji Won; JQ (makeumine works)	Alex Mood; Mariella "Bambi" Garcia Balandina; Oskar Salhin; Mimmi Gyltman; Rassmus Björnson	Mariella "Bambi" Garcia Balandina; Rassmus Björnson	3:32
2.	"Four Seasons"	Kenzie	Kenzie; Josh Cumbee; Afshin Salmani; Andrew Allen	Kenzie; NONFICTION (AFSHeeN, Josh Cumbee)	3:08
Total length:					6:40

== Charts ==
=== Weekly charts ===
"Four Seasons" weekly chart performance
Chart (2019)	Peak position
Japan Download Songs (Billboard Japan)	67
South Korea (Gaon)	1
South Korea (K-pop Hot 100)	1
US World Digital Songs (Billboard)	6

=== Monthly charts ===
"Four Seasons" monthly chart performance
Chart (2019)	Peak position
South Korean Albums (Gaon)	2

=== Year-end charts ===
"Four Seasons" year-end chart positions
Chart (2019)	Position
South Korea (Gaon) – 2019	9
South Korea (Gaon) – 2020	81
South Korea (Gaon) – 2021	158

== Certifications and sales ==
Sales and certifications for "Four Seasons"
Region	Certification	Certified units/sales
Download
South Korea (KMCA)	Platinum	2,500,000^{*}
Streaming
South Korea (KMCA)	2× Platinum	200,000,000^{†}
^{*} Sales figures based on certification alone.^{†} Streaming-only figures based on certification alone.

== Credits and personnel ==
Credits are adapted from the CD booklet of Purpose.

Studio

- SM Big Shot Studio – recording, engineered for mix
- Seoul Studio – recording
- Prelude Studio – recording
- Doobdoob Studio – digital editing
- SM Yellow Tail Studio – mixing
- 821 Sound – mastering

Personnel

- SM Entertainment – executive producer
- Lee Soo-man – producer
- Yoo Young-jin – music and sound supervisor
- Taeyeon – vocals, background vocals
- Kenzie – lyrics, composition, arrangement, vocal directing
- Josh Cumbee (Nonfiction) – composition, arrangement
- Afshin Salmani a.k.a. AFSHeeN (Nonfiction) – composition, arrangement
- Andrew Allen – composition
- Choi Hoon – bass
- Hong Jun-ho – guitar
- Nile Lee – strings conducting, strings arrangement
- On The String – strings
- Lee Min-kyu – recording, engineered for mix
- Jeong Ki-hong – recording
- Lee Chang-sun – recording
- Choi Da-in – recording assistant
- Jang Woo-young – digital editing
- Koo Jong-pil – mixing
- Kwon Nam-woo – mastering

== Release history ==
Region	Date	Format	Label
Various	March 24, 2019	Digital download; streaming	SM Entertainment

== See also ==
- List of Inkigayo Chart winners (2019)
- List of Show! Music Core Chart winners (2019)
- List of Gaon Digital Chart number ones of 2019
- List of K-pop Hot 100 number ones
- List of certified songs in South Korea
