= 34th Golden Disc Awards =

2020 South Korean music awards ceremony

- Date: January 4–5, 2020
- Location: Gocheok Sky Dome, Seoul
- Country: South Korea
- Hosted by: Lee Seung-gi; Park So-dam; Lee Da-hee; Sung Si-kyung
- Website: Golden Disc

Television/radio coverage
- Network: JTBC, JTBC2, JTBC4, Vlive

The 34th Golden Disc Awards ceremony was held from January 4–5, 2020. The JTBC network broadcast the show from the Gocheok Sky Dome in Seoul. Lee Da-hee and Sung Si-kyung served as hosts on the first day, with Lee Seung-gi and Park So-dam on the second.

== Criteria ==
The first part of this two-day award ceremony highlighted the biggest digital releases in 2019. The second part, taking place on January 5, recognised achievements in the category of physical album releases. Fans cast their votes for the 'Popularity Award', which was 100% determined by online votes via TikTok. Voting for the 'Fan's Choice K-Pop Star' award took place via Chinese music streaming platforms.

== Winners and nominees ==
Winners are listed first in alphabetical order and emphasized in bold.

The following is the list of winners:

Digital Song Daesang (Song of the Year)	Album Daesang (Album of the Year)
**BTS – "Boy with Luv"**; AKMU – "How Can I Love The Heartbreak, You're The One I Love"; Chungha – "Gotta Go"; Itzy – "Dalla Dalla"; Jannabi – "For Lovers Who Hesitate"; Jennie – "Solo"; MC the Max – "After You've Gone"; Paul Kim – "Me After You"; Taeyeon – "Four Seasons"; Twice – "Yes or Yes"	**BTS – Map of the Soul: Persona**; Baekhyun – City Lights; Exo-SC – What a Life; Got7 – Spinning Top: Between Security & Insecurity; Monsta X – Take.2 We Are Here; NCT Dream – We Boom; NU'EST – Happily Ever After; Seventeen – An Ode; Super Junior – Time Slip; Twice – Feel Special
Digital Song Bonsang	Album Bonsang
**AKMU – "How Can I Love The Heartbreak, You're The One I Love"**; **BTS – "Boy with Luv"**; **Chungha – "Gotta Go"**; **Itzy – "Dalla Dalla"**; **Jannabi – "For Lovers Who Hesitate"**; **Jennie – "Solo"**; **MC the Max – "After You've Gone"**; **Paul Kim – "Me After You"**; **Taeyeon – "Four Seasons"**; **Twice – "Yes or Yes"**	**Baekhyun – City Lights**; **BTS – Map of the Soul: Persona**; **Exo-SC – What a Life**; **Got7 – Spinning Top: Between Security & Insecurity**; **Monsta X – Take.2 We Are Here**; **NCT Dream – We Boom**; **NU'EST – Happily Ever After**; **Seventeen – An Ode**; **Super Junior – Time Slip**; **Twice – Feel Special**
Rookie Artist of the Year
**Itzy**; **Tomorrow X Together**

=== Genre & Other Awards ===
Award	Winner
Best R&B Hip Hop Award	Zico
Best Solo Artist	Hwasa
Best Trot Award	Song Ga-in
TikTok Golden Disc Popularity Award	BTS
NetEase Fans Choice K-Pop Star Award	BTS
Performance Award	Astro
Performance Award	(G)I-dle
Best OST	Gummy
Best Group Award	Mamamoo
Next Generation Award	Kim Jae Hwan
Next Generation Award	AB6IX
Next Generation Award	Ateez
Producer Award	Bang Si-hyuk
