= Blooming Blue =

2018 extended play by Chung Ha

- Digital cover

EP by Chung Ha
- Released: July 18, 2018
- Recorded: 2018
- Genre: K-pop
- Length: 14:32
- Labels: MNH; Stone Music

Chung Ha chronology
Offset (2018)	Blooming Blue (2018)	XII (2019)

Singles from Blooming Blue
- 1. "Love U" Released: July 18, 2018

Blooming Blue is the third extended play by South Korean singer Chung Ha. It was released by MNH Entertainment and distributed by Stone Music Entertainment on July 18, 2018.

== Release ==
The EP was released on July 18, 2018, through several music portals, including MelOn and iTunes.

== Commercial performance ==
Blooming Blue debuted and peaked at number 9 on the Gaon Album Chart, on the week of July 21, 2018. In its second week, the EP fell to number 39, and 68 a week later. The EP charted for five consecutive weeks on the chart.

The EP was the 29th best selling-album of July 2018, with 8,826 physical copies sold. The EP has sold over 9,992 copies as of August 2018.

== Track listing ==
Digital download/CD

No.	Title	Lyrics	Music	Arrangement	Length
1.	"BB"		Vincenzo; Fuxxy; Any Masingga	Vincenzo	1:17
2.	"Love U"	Iggy (Oreo); Cino (Oreo); Uh-kim (Oreo)	Iggy (Oreo); Cino (Oreo); Uh-kim (Oreo)	Iggy (Oreo); Cino (Oreo); Uh-kim (Oreo)	3:10
3.	"Cherry Kisses"	Vincenzo; Coach & Sendo; Anne Judith Wik; Nermin Harambašić; Ronny Vidar Svendsen	Coach & Sendo; Anne Judith Wik; Nermin Harambašić; Ronny Vidar Svendsen	Coach & Sendo	3:14
4.	"Drive"	Vincenzo; Fuxxy; Any Masingga	Vincenzo; Fuxxy; Any Masingga	Any Masingga	3:16
5.	"From Now On"	Baek Ye-rin	Baek Ye-rin	Cloud	3:29
Total length:					14:32

== Charts ==
Chart (2018)	Peak position
South Korea (Gaon)	9

== Release history ==
Region	Date	Format	Label
South Korea	July 18, 2018	CD, digital download	MNH Entertainment, CJ E&M Music
Worldwide	July 18, 2018	Digital download	MNH Entertainment
