= Gotta Go (Chung Ha song) =

2019 single by Chung Ha

- Korean cover

Single by Chung Ha
- Released: January 2, 2019
- Recorded: 2018
- Genre: K-pop; dance
- Length: 3:41
- Label: MNH; Stone Music
- Songwriters: Black Eyed Pilseung; Jeon Goon
- Producer: Black Eyed Pilseung

Chung Ha singles chronology
"Whatcha Doin'" (2018)	"Gotta Go" (2019)	"Live" (2019)

Chung Ha chronology
Blooming Blue (2018)	XII (2019)	Flourishing (2019)

Alternate cover
- International cover

Music video
- "Gotta Go (MNH)" on YouTube "Gotta Go (Stone)" on YouTube

"Gotta Go" (Korean: 벌써 12시; RR: Beolsseo Yeoldu-si; lit. "Already 12 o'clock") is a song recorded by South Korean singer Chung Ha. It was released as a single on January 2, 2019, by MNH Entertainment and distributed by Genie Music, and was promoted as a single album. Adopting a darker style, the princess concept appears to be a shift away from the "girl crush" image of her previous albums Hands on Me and Offset.

== Background and release ==
Chung Ha unveiled three teaser photos and two music video teasers for the song before its release. "Gotta Go" was released digitally and physically on January 2, 2019; the physical edition is a single album titled XII. The song was also released as a separate digital single through several music portals, including iTunes.

== Composition ==
"Gotta Go" moves Chung Ha into a more sultry place than her past singles with its vibrant flute sounds and squelching synths acting as a backdrop to her rich vocals. Chung Ha mentioned she had always wanted to do a concept like this. Though “Gotta Go” shows a new and different side of Chung Ha, it also marks her return to collaborating with Black Eyed Pilseung and Jeon Goon, the team behind her 2018 hit "Roller Coaster." The song's Korean title literally translates to "Already Midnight". In an interview with Billboard, Chung Ha elaborated on the song's musical direction by saying:

"A summer vibe me was there during 2018, and sparkly Chung Ha was there, but this time it’s very different. I don’t have all that glitter. This is more of my personal style, I guess. I wanted to go very dark. There’s a very different side of me so I’m excited to show that to fans."

== Reception ==
"Gotta Go" peaked at number two on the Gaon Digital Chart, number one on the Billboard K-Pop Hot 100 and number six on the World Digital Song Sales chart, becoming her most successful single to date and her first top 10 entry on the latter. It was the second most-downloaded, eighth most-streamed and overall the eighth best performing song of 2019 in South Korea. It also reached the charts in New Zealand and Singapore. The single also brought Chung Ha her first music program trophy at MBC Music's Show Champion on January 9 and went on to receive 7 total wins. As of June 2022, it has over 90 million views on YouTube and 108 million streams on Spotify.

"Gotta Go" on critic lists
Critic/Publication	List	Rank	Ref.
Billboard	The 25 Best K-pop Songs of 2019	3	
Billboard	The 100 Greatest K-Pop Songs of the 2010s	100	
BuzzFeed	Best K-pop Music Videos of 2019	14	
Melon	Top 100 K-pop Songs of All Time	51	
Refinery29	The Best K-Pop Songs Of 2019	12	

== Music video ==
The music video is less girlish than her prior ones, replacing the aforementioned sparkles and glitter with mature, bolder looks, such as power shoulders and a smokey eye and lip hues. Choreography-wise, things similarly shift away from the past, with the emphasis being on theatrical elements like hand moves emulating a clock striking midnight and intense footwork.

== Accolades ==
Awards and nominations
Year	Organization	Category	Result	Ref.
2019	Melon Music Awards	Best Female Dance	Won	
2019	Melon Music Awards	Song of the Year	Nominated	
2019	Mnet Asian Music Awards	Song of the Year	Nominated	
2019	Mnet Asian Music Awards	Best Dance Performance – Solo	Won	
2020	Gaon Chart Music Awards	Song of the Year – January	Nominated	
2020	Gaon Chart Music Awards	Record Production of the Year	Won	
2020	Golden Disc Awards	Digital Bonsang	Won	
2020	Golden Disc Awards	Digital Daesang	Nominated	
2020	Seoul Music Awards	Dance Performance Award	Nominated	

Music program awards
Program	Date	Ref.
Show Champion	January 9, 2019	
M Countdown	January 10, 2019	
Show! Music Core	January 12, 2019	
Show! Music Core	January 19, 2019	
Show! Music Core	February 16, 2019	
Inkigayo	January 13, 2019	
Music Bank	January 18, 2019	

== Track listing ==
- CD / digital download
1. "벌써 12시 (Gotta Go)" – 3:41

== Chart performance ==
=== Weekly charts ===
Chart (2019)	Peak position
New Zealand Hot Singles (RMNZ)	23
Singapore (RIAS)	25
South Korea (Gaon)	2
South Korea Albums (Gaon)	4
South Korea (K-pop Hot 100)	1
US World Digital Songs (Billboard)	6

=== Year-end charts ===
Chart (2019)	Position
South Korea (Gaon)	8

== Sales and certifications ==
Sales and certifications for "Gotta Go"
Region	Certification	Certified units/sales
South Korea Single album	—	10,000
United States	—	2,000
Streaming
South Korea (KMCA)	Platinum	100,000,000^{†}
^{†} Streaming-only figures based on certification alone.

== See also ==
- List of Inkigayo Chart winners (2019)
- List of Kpop Hot 100 number ones
- List of M Countdown Chart winners (2019)
