= 2WayMirror =

EP by Gabbie Hanna
- Released: May 31, 2019
- Length: 19:46
- Label: FrtyFve
- Producers: Alina Smith; Elli Moore

Gabbie Hanna chronology
2WayMirror (2019)	Bad Karma (2020)

Singles from 2WayMirror
- 1. "Medicate" Released: February 1, 2019; 2. "Butterflies" Released: May 31, 2019

2WayMirror (stylized in all caps) is the debut extended play by American singer-songwriter Gabbie Hanna, released independently on May 31, 2019. The EP includes the lead single "Medicate". Hanna has said the EP was inspired by one of her ex-boyfriends, who was in a YouTube video she posted. Hanna made the EP available for pre-sale on May 18, 2019. The album debuted at number 126 on the US Billboard 200, with 7,000 units sold, becoming her only musical project to chart on the “Top 200” respectively.

== Background and promotion ==
Hanna initially began the project as a single titled "Butterflies", before the project eventually became an EP. The first song she wrote and recorded for the EP was "Broken Girls" in December 2018.

After the EP was announced, Hanna had fans vote on two album covers, and whichever one won would be the official cover of the EP.

Hanna initially teased five songs to be on the EP. "Medicate" was confirmed as the lead single and the four other tracks were confirmed: "Butterflies", "Perfect Day (A True Story)", "Pillowcase", and "Broken Girls". However, a sixth song, "Goodbye, for Now", was leaked by Hanna's producer, Alina Smith. Hanna later confirmed the EP will contain 13 tracks total, but reaffirmed its status as an extended play, and would not be considered an album. Hanna announced on May 12, 2019 that she completed the EP.

== Composition ==
Hanna has described 2WayMirror as a "perfect loop" due to the fact that "I'm Sorry" loops directly into "She Wrote It About You?", completing the loop. Other tracks such as "She Wrote It About You?" and "Broken Girls" blend together musically. Even though 2WayMirror contains 13 tracks, Hanna has reaffirmed the work's status an EP, despite streaming services labeling it as an album. The songs on the EP detail a tumultuous relationship with one of Hanna's ex boyfriends, revealed in a YouTube video in which the two appeared, with the exception of the second single, "Butterflies", which is confirmed to be about two men Hanna was interested in at the same time. Other themes explored on the EP include depression and heartbreak.

The remaining 7 tracks are either intros, outros or bits of voice messages that she had exchanged with her then-boyfriend during their breakup, and serve to contextualise the song and frame the EP within the narrative of her breakup.

== Singles and music videos ==
"Medicate" was released on February 1, 2019 as the lead single from 2WayMirror. It was accompanied by a music video. Commercially, it reached number 31 on the US Digital Songs chart, while becoming her first single to chart in New Zealand. "Butterflies" was released alongside the EP as the second single on May 31, 2019. It was also accompanied by a music video. Commercially, it reached number 37 on the New Zealand Hot Singles chart. While it was not released as a single, "Perfect Day (A True Story)" was also accompanied by a music video. Hanna later said she is filming a music video for every song on the EP. Hanna confirmed on July 21, 2019 that filming for the "Pillowcase" music video had begun. The music video for "Pillowcase" was released on August 17, 2019, which also included the interlude songs "This Isn't Fun For Me" and "Exhausted". The music video for "Broken Girls" and "Broken Boys" was confirmed in a YouTube video uploaded by Hanna. The "Broken Girls" music video was released on November 16, 2019. The music video for "Goodbye, For Now" was released on September 3, 2020.

== Live performances ==
Hanna performed "Medicate" along with a freestyle rap on February 17, 2019 at VidCon London.

Hanna performed acoustic versions of "Pillowcase" and "Butterflies" with Elli Moore at VidCon LA on July 13, 2019. Each song from the EP was performed as well as the song "Antisocial Media" later the same day.

Hanna performed "Medicate" at the First Inaugural Patreon Assembly on November 2, 2019 along with "Monster", "Monster (Reborn)", and the unreleased song, "Sleepyhead" and "Today", which was later revealed to be from her second album, This Time Next Year.

== Track listing ==
All tracks are written by Gabbie Hanna, Alina Smith, and Elli Moore. All tracks produced by Smith and Moore.

2WayMirror
No.	Title	Length
1.	"She Wrote It About You?"	0:07
2.	"Broken Girls"	3:01
3.	"Broken Boys"	0:46
4.	"Butterflies"	3:09
5.	"It's Not Okay What I Did"	0:21
6.	"Perfect Day - A True Story"	2:46
7.	"This Isn't Fun for Me"	0:02
8.	"Pillowcase"	2:45
9.	"Exhausted"	0:04
10.	"Medicate"	3:24
11.	"Chances"	0:15
12.	"Goodbye, for Now"	2:51
13.	"I'm Sorry"	0:15
Total length:		19:46

== Personnel ==
=== Performance ===
- Gabbie Hanna – vocals, songwriting
- Elli Moore – background vocals, songwriting
- Spencer Sharp – uncredited guest vocals

=== Production ===
- Lyre (Smith & Moore) – production, songwriting

== Charts ==
Chart performance for 2WayMirror
Chart (2019)	Peak position
Australian Albums (ARIA)	76
Belgian Albums (Ultratop Flanders)	174
UK Download Albums (OCC)	31
UK Independent Albums (Official Charts)	44
US Billboard 200	126
US Independent Albums (Billboard)	4
