= Out Loud =

Out Loud may refer to:

- Out Loud (Boom Boom Satellites album), 1998
- Out Loud (Naio Ssaion album), 2005
- "Out Loud" (song), a 2017 song by Gabbie Hanna

== See also ==
- Out Louder, a 2006 album by Medeski Scofield Martin & Wood
- Outloud (disambiguation)
