= Refresh 7th =

- Digital and physical only.

EP by BP Rania
- Released: August 12, 2017
- Genre: K-pop; dance-pop; electropop; hip hop
- Length: 14:30
- Label: DR; Danal; INGENIOmedia
- Producer: Labyron Walton

BP Rania chronology
Start a Fire (2016)	Refresh 7th (2017)	Goodbye Rania (2020)

Singles from Refresh 7th
- 1. "Beep Beep Beep" Released: August 12, 2017; 2. "Breathe Heavy" Released: September 19, 2017

Refresh 7th is the fifth extended play by South Korean girl group, BP Rania, released by DR Music and distributed by Danal Entertainment and INGeNIOmedia. The EP marked the final release to feature 5 of the group's 6 members, as well as the last release promoted under the BP Rania name.

== Background information ==
On August 3, 2017, it was announced that BP Rania would be making a coming back with a new song titled "Beep Beep Beep", which would be promoted through busking to better approach the public. On August 8, the group revealed during their performance that the title of their next album would be Refresh 7th. Promotions became controversial when fans and viewers noticed that Alex had few lines and spent the majority of the performance standing to the side while the remaining five members continued to dance and sing.

In September of that year, the group made their return with their next single "Breathe Heavy," which reverted to their sexy concept. It was reported that member Alex would not be participating in the comeback due to scheduling conflicts.

== Track listing ==
No.	Title	Length
1.	"Beep Beep Beep"	3:53
2.	"Breathe Heavy"	3:42
3.	"No Dab" (performed by Alex and Hyeme)	3:12
4.	"Breath Heavy" (Eng ver.)	3:42
Total length:		14:30
