= Alina Smith =

American singer-songwriter and record producer (born 1987)

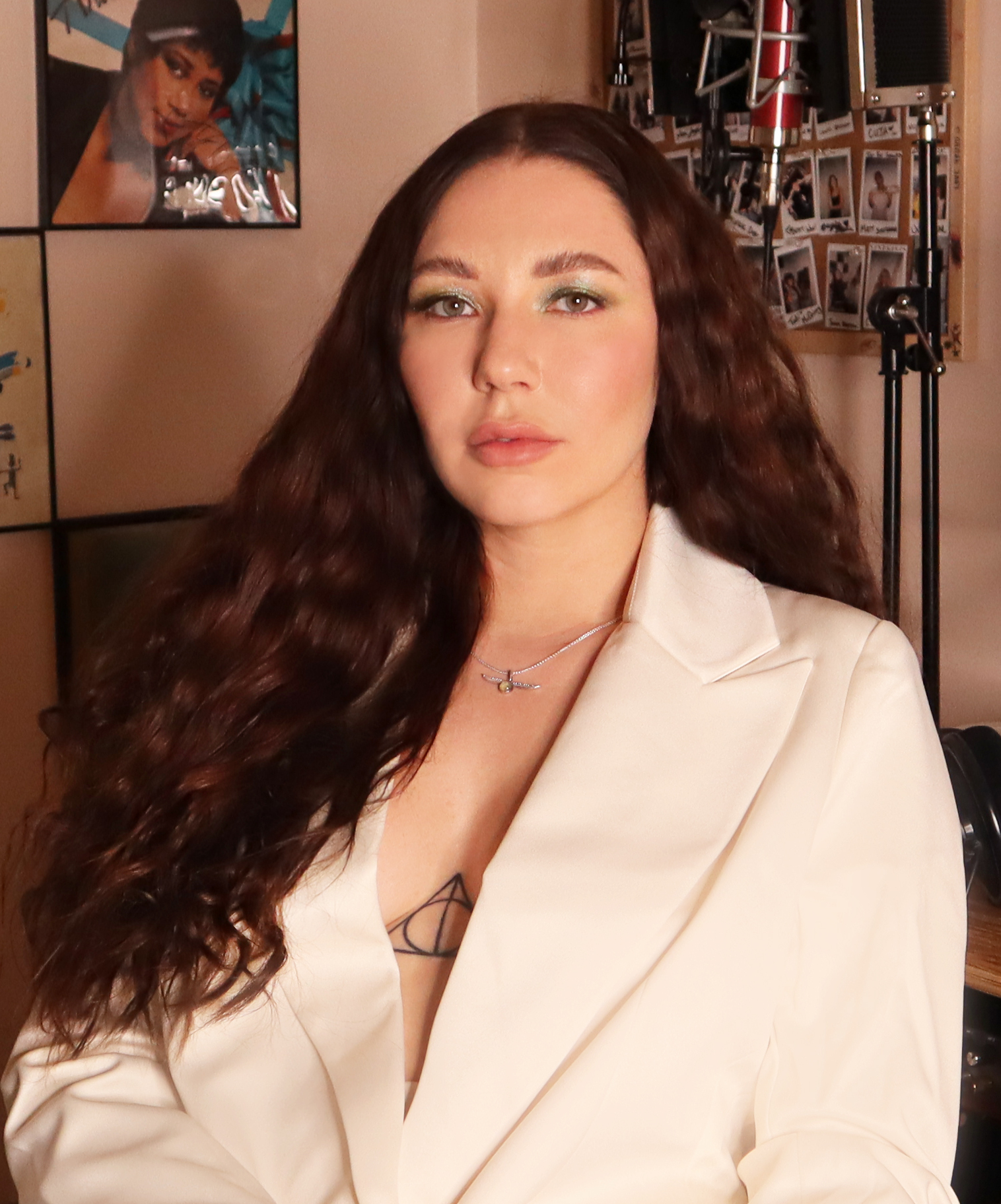
- Smith in 2021

Background information
- Born: August 25, 1987 (age 39); St. Petersburg, Soviet Union
- Genres: Pop, K-Pop
- Occupations: Record producer, songwriter, singer
- Instruments: Vocals, guitar, piano, keyboards
- Website: lyremusicgroup.com

Alina Smith (born August 25, 1987) is a Russian-American pop singer, songwriter and, record producer. She is a co-founder of the music writing and production company Lyre, and she has written and produced songs for artists including Betty Who, Itzy, Kep1er, Gabi DeMartino and Red Velvet.

== Early life ==
Alina Smith was born in St. Petersburg, Soviet Union. She began singing and playing piano at three, fully conversing in both languages (English and Russian) at four; and composing music and writing poetry and stories from five years old. As a child, she toured with the music group Aurora as a singer.

== Career ==
In 2010, Sony Japan picked Smith's composition "Fallin' 4 U" to be the debut single from the artist Aisha, featuring Darryl McDaniels of Run DMC. In 2011, Smith's own song "Kissing Tree" was selected for a compilation CD released to raise relief funds after the Japanese earthquake and tsunami.

In February 2015, country music trade publication MusicRow announced that Smith was signed to a publishing contract with the major label publishing affiliate BMG/Chrysalis in a joint venture with Big Stage Music LLC. Her single "Free Beer" was released for sale on February 17 and selected as upcoming artist/song for play by nationwide satellite channel The Highway (Sirius XM) on its "On the Horizon" program. On March 19, Smith appeared on The Bobby Bones Show podcast to perform her song "Ride".

In 2016, Smith and Elli Moore founded Lyre, a music writing and production company.

In 2017, Smith wrote "Talk to Me", a track for Red Velvet's EP Rookie, and produced "Bad Weather" by Kirstin Maldonado. In 2018, Smith worked with Gabbie Hanna on her song "Honestly", and produced Niki and Gabi's EP Individual. That same year, Lyre also heavily contributed to Kenzie's EP Phases. Smith also wrote the song "Rocket Girls" for Rocket Girls 101.

In 2019, Smith produced the vocals for Betty Who on her studio album Betty. She was also a writer for Fall Out Boy's "Hands Up."

In 2020, Alina Smith produced the Confections EP, the debut album from the other half of Lyre, Elli Moore . On August 25, Smith released her first single, “Girl That Was Perfect”.

In 2021, Smith co-wrote "In the Morning", the lead single for Itzy's EP Guess Who. The following year, Alina produced Gabi DeMartino's debut studio album, Paintings of Me. Smith returned in 2023 with several major K-pop releases, producing and writing "Giddy" for Kep1er's EP LOVESTRUCK! and "Sweet Juice" for Purple Kiss's EP Cabin Fever, as well as co-composing "KARMA" for BLACKSWAN's single album That Karma and "BITE BACK" for Cyndi Wang's 20th-anniversary album BITE BACK.

== Discography ==
=== Extended plays ===
Title	Album details
2000s Teen	Released: September 3, 2021; Label: LYRE Music

=== Singles ===
Title	Year	Album
"Free Beer"	2015	Non-album single
"Girl That Was Perfect"	2020	2000s Teen
"Breakfast"	2021	2000s Teen
"Hollywood Heart"	2021	2000s Teen
"Moody"	2022	Non-album singles
"Boss Up"	2022	Non-album singles

=== Songwriting credits ===
List of songs co-written for other artists
Song	Year	Artist	Album
"Talk to Me"	2017	Red Velvet	Rookie
"Breathe"	2017	Mackenzie Ziegler	Non-album single
"All Night Kinda Night"	2017	Rainz	Sunshine
"Cherry on Top"	2018	10:45 (The Uni+)	The Uni+ G Step 1
"Day & Night"	2018	Steve Wu	Non-album single
"Call Me Crazy"	2020	Gabbie Hanna	Non-album single
"In The Morning"	2021	Itzy	Guess Who
"Bada Boom"	2022	Solar & Moonbyul	Street Dance Girls Fighter (SGF) Special
"Surprise"	2022	Class:y	Lives Across
"Oh Sorry ya"	2022	Sunmi	Non-album single
"I"	2022	Lightsum	Into the Light
"Classy"	2022	Class:y	Lives Across
"Nuh-Uh"	2022	Chungha	Bare & Rare
"Sunflower (P.E.L)"	2022	Choi Yoo-jung	Sunflower
"Loveable"	2022	Jo Yu-ri	Op.22 Y-Waltz: in Minor
"Beam"	2023	TripleS	Assemble
"Sweet Juice"	2023	Purple Kiss	Cabin Fever
"Giddy"	2023	Kep1er	Lovestruck!
"Bzz Bzz"	2023	Moonchild	Delicious Poison
"Karma"	2023	Blackswan	That Karma
"Paradise"	2023	Oh My Girl	Golden Hourglass
"Beautiful Night"	2023	Kwon Eun-bi	The Flash
"Bitter Taste"	2023	Jo Yu-ri	Love All
"Black Soul Dress"	2023	TripleS–Lovelution	ↀ (Muhan)
"Low-key Scared But H1-Key Ready"	2023	H1-Key	Seoul Dreaming
"Aphrodite"	2023	Wheein	In the Mood
"Iced Coffee"	2023	Red Velvet	Chill Kill
"Dopamine"	2024	Unis	We Unis
"On My Lips"	2024	Ichillin'	Feelin' Hot
"Starlight"	2024	Loossemble	One of a Kind
"Honey Honey"	2024	Solar	Colours
"Bout That Issue"	2024	All(H)Ours	Witness
"Roll Up"	2024	Blackswan	Roll Up
"Double Down"	2024	Blackswan	Roll Up
