= Demonstrate (EP) =

EP by Rania
- Released: November 5, 2015
- Recorded: 2015
- Genre: K-pop; dance-pop; electropop; hip hop
- Length: 15:53
- Label: DR; Danal

Rania chronology
Just Go (Goodbye's the New Hello) (2013)	Demonstrate (2015)	Start a Fire (2016)

Singles from Demonstrate
- 1. "Up" Released: July 4, 2013; 2. "Demonstrate" Released: November 5, 2015

Demonstrate is the third extended play by South Korean girl group, Rania, released by DR Music and distributed by Danal Entertainment. The EP was the last release to feature original members Di, Xia, T-ae and the final release under name RaNia, until the name change of BP Rania.

While marking the debut of Seulji, Hyeme as well as Alexandra Reid, who is the first African-American rapper to debuting in a Korean group. The EP was released on November 5, 2015, and met with controversy due to the album being marked as "Rania Five," and Alex not being included in the MV. the lead single, "Demonstrate," peaked at number 25 on the Gaon Social Chart.

== Release and reception ==
Rania released Demonstrate on November 5, and had their comeback showcase on November 11 in Gangnam-gu, Seoul. The release of Demonstrate gained attention from the Korean media due to the debut of Alex as well as the release being the group's first in over 2 years. The music video for Demonstrate was met with controversy due to Alex being physically absent, as well as the group being referred to as "Rania Five," despite the group having six members. However, DR released a statement, claiming that Alex was absent from promotional material as a result of visa issues.

The single "Demonstrate," peaked at #25 on the GAON Social Chart. Despite this being Seulji's debut, she is not featured on any of the tracks. Xia sings Seulji's parts in the studio versions of "Demonstrate" and "Get Out". Former members Jooyi and Saem sing on "Hello" and "Up".

== Track listing ==
No.	Title	Writer(s)	Arrangement	Length
1.	"Demonstrate"	Kim Eana	Phil Bentley, Aimee Proal, Brian Kierulf, Alex Wright	3:04
2.	"Hello"	Labyron Walton		3:28
3.	"Get Out"	SanchoBeatz	SanchoBeatz	3:07
4.	"Up"			3:00
5.	"Demonstrate Rap Version"	Kim Eana, Alexandra Reid	A. Wright	3:14
Total length:				15:53
