= Bad Karma (EP) =

EP by Gabbie Hanna
- Released: May 15, 2020
- Recorded: 2020
- Genre: Pop
- Length: 14:03
- Label: FrtyFve
- Producer: Alina Smith; Elli Moore

Gabbie Hanna chronology
2WayMirror (2019)	Bad Karma (2020)	Trauma Queen (2022)

Singles from Bad Karma
- 1. "Dandelion" Released: April 17, 2020; 2. "Glass House" Released: May 1, 2020

Bad Karma is the second extended play by singer-songwriter Gabbie Hanna, released on May 15, 2020. The EP includes the five songs "Dandelion", "Glass House", "Bad Karma", "Special", and "Happy". The EP peaked at number 45 on the US Top Current Albums chart, and at number 22 on the Heatseekers Albums chart.

== Background and promotion ==
On March 19, 2020, Hanna teased she would release an EP, due to the COVID-19 pandemic delaying the release of her then-planned debut album, This Time Next Year. (Note: This Time Next Year was initially planned to be Hanna's debut studio album, first teased in 2017. After years of delays, trac list changes, and controversies in Hanna's career, the album was scrapped and replaced by Hanna's debut album Trauma Queen in 2022. Hanna would later release This Time Next Year later the same year, albeit with major differences from the initial concept as it was first shown to have prior to being temporarily shelved.) The EP's lead single, "Dandelion", was released on April 17, 2020, alongside a music video animated by Hokuto Konishi. "Glass House" was released as the EP's second single on May 1, 2020, alongside a music video.

== Music videos ==
All five songs on the EP have a music video. The music video for "Dandelion" was released on April 17, 2020, and the music video for "Glass House" was released on May 1, 2020. On May 16, 2020, the music video for "Bad Karma" was released, alongside the EP. The music videos for "Special" and "Happy" were released on June 14, 2020 and September 1, 2020, respectively.

== Track listing ==
All tracks are written by Gabbie Hanna, Alina Smith, and Elli Moore, except where noted. All tracks are produced by Smith.

Bad Karma track listing
No.	Title	Length
1.	"Glass House"	2:03
2.	"Bad Karma"	2:44
3.	"Special" (Hanna)	3:03
4.	"Dandelion"	2:41
5.	"Happy"	3:29
Total length:		14:03

== Charts ==
Chart performance for Bad Karma
Chart (2020)	Peak position
US Heatseekers Albums (Billboard)	22
US Top Album Sales (Billboard)	71
US Top Current Albums (Billboard)	45
