= Goodbye Rania =

2020 studio album by Blackswan

Studio album by Blackswan
- Released: October 16, 2020
- Recorded: 2011–2020
- Studio: Honey Butter Studio; Seoul, South Korea
- Genre: Dance-pop; nu-disco; hip hop
- Length: 46:21
- Label: DR; Danal Entertainment
- Producer: Peter pan; Shark; A. Wright; Mick Schultz

Blackswan chronology
Refresh 7th (2017)	Goodbye Rania (2020)	Close to Me (2021)

Singles from Goodbye RANIA
- 1. "Tonight" Released: October 16, 2020; 2. "Over & Over" Released: October 16, 2020

Goodbye Rania (stylized as Goodbye RANIA) is the second studio album by South Korean multinational girl group Blackswan, released through DR Music on October 16, 2020. The album contains three new tracks including the double lead single "Tonight" and "Over & Over" and also previous single release by Rania from 2011 to 2017. It marks their first release after re-debut as Blackswan with previous Rania member Hyeme, Leia, Youngheun and two new member Judy, and Fatou. It was the last release with member Hyeme prior to her departure from the group on November 9, 2020.

== Background information ==
On June 26, 2020, it was announced by DR Music that they would be debuting their girl group Rania as Black Swan, consisting of 3 Rania members, plus new members Judy and Fatou. The group originally had their debut scheduled in the early half of 2020, but it was postponed due to the COVID-19 pandemic that occurred earlier in the year. On September 25, it was announced that the group had already filmed their debut MV and would be debuting in October 2020. On October 9, the group began posting teaser images to social media, revealing the album title and release date of October 16. On October 14, the band released a teaser for lead single, "Tonight," said to be written and produced by Melanie Fontana.

== Promotion ==
Black Swan promoted their debut at the Pyeongchang Peace Festival on August 7, 2020, where they performed songs "Demonstrate," and "Tonight." On October 20, the group released a dance performance MV.

The group began to promote their title track "Tonight" on October 30 performing on KBS 2TV's Music Bank, followed by performances on SBS MTV's The Show on November 3, and another Music Bank performance on November 6.

== Track listing ==
Credits adapted from Genius.

No.	Title	Writer(s)	Arrangement	Length
1.	"Tonight"	Peter Pan	Shark, A. Wright	2:57
2.	"Over & Over"	Peter Pan, Lucy	Shark, A. Wright	3:34
3.	"Let Me Dance"	Peter Pan	Shark, A. Wright	3:31
4.	"DR Feel Good (Remix)"	Teddy Riley, Richard Garcia, Rosel A Minster, Dominique Rodriguez, Jessica Bryant	Joe Hann, Noden, Teddy Riley, Richard Garcia, Rosel A Minster, Dominique Rodriguez, Jessica Bryant	2:29
5.	"Just Go (Remix)"	A. Wright, Barnaby Pinny	Joe Hann, Noden, Brian Kierulf, Joshua Schwartz, KNS Productions, A. Wright	3:25
6.	"Hello (Remix)"	Labyron Walton	Joe Hann, Noden, Labyron Walton	2:58
7.	"Up (Remix)"			2:58
8.	"Demonstrate (Remix)"	Kim Eana	Joe Hann, Noden, A. Wright	3:03
9.	"Get Out (Remix)"			3:06
10.	"Start A Fire"	Alexandra Reid, Nassun	Chris Sena	3:26
11.	"Make Me Ah"	Alexandre Reid, Peter Pan, Park Hyun Joong	A-Dee	3:58
12.	"Beep Beep Beep"	Alexandra Reid, Gunwoo Kim	Gunwoo Kim, TODAY	3:53
13.	"No Dab"	Alexandra Reid, Nassun	EJ Show	3:12
14.	"Breathe Heavy"	Peter Pan, Park Hyun Joong	Mick Schultz	3:42
Total length:				39:41
