= Numedia =

Numedia may refer to:

== Media ==
- New Media
- NuMedia, New York music producers, Life on a String (album)
- NUMedia, student media society, University of Northampton

== Music ==
- Numedia (Naio Ssaion album), Slovenian-language album 2004

== See also ==
- Kingdom of Numidia
