= Medicate (Gabbie Hanna song) =

2019 single by Gabbie Hanna

Single by Gabbie Hanna

from the EP 2WayMirror
- Released: February 1, 2019
- Recorded: January 2019
- Length: 3:24
- Label: FrtyFve
- Songwriters: Gabbie Hanna; Lyre
- Producer: Lyre

Gabbie Hanna singles chronology
"Monster/Monster (Reborn)" (2018)	"Medicate" (2019)	"Butterflies" (2019)

Music video
- "Medicate" on YouTube

"Medicate" is a song written and recorded by singer-songwriter and internet personality Gabbie Hanna, released on February 1, 2019. It was released for digital download and streaming as the lead single from Hanna's debut EP, 2WayMirror. It was written by Hanna alongside American music production duo Lyre (Alina Smith & Elli Moore), who also produced the track.

== Music and lyrics ==
"Medicate" has a length of three minutes and twenty four seconds. It is in the key of G minor, with Hanna's vocal range spanning from the low note of F_{3} to the high note of C_{5}. The lyrics of "Medicate" explore the theme of anti-depressants and wondering if it will help with depression.

== Critical reception ==
Nashmia Adnan, writing for Dankanator, called the song "more professional and mature" in comparison to her previous singles.

== Music video ==
A music video for the song was uploaded to YouTube on February 2, 2019. The video features Hanna in a warehouse, sitting on a chair with multiple of the same chairs forming a circle. At the climax to the song, a second version of Hanna appears—a version seen in previous music videos of hers.

== Live performances ==
Hanna performed "Medicate" on February 17, 2019, at VidCon London. She would later perform the song again at VidCon LA on July 13, 2019, alongside the rest of 2WayMirror.

Hanna performed "Medicate" at the First Inaugural Patreon Assembly on November 2, 2019, along with "Monster", "Monster (Reborn)", and two unreleased songs: "Sleepyhead" and "Today" (the latter of which was later included on her second studio album This Time Next Year (2022)).

== Commercial performance ==
Commercially, "Medicate" experienced modest chart success overall. In North America, the single became Hanna's third US Digital Songs entry, debuting and peaking at number 31. In the United Kingdom, it peaked at number 97 on the country's Downloads chart, making it her lowest entry on said chart. In Scotland, the single debuted and peaked at number 80 in Scotland, making it her fifth entry on the chart. It became Hanna's most successful single in Oceania, debuting and peaking at number 32 on the New Zealand Hot Singles chart. In the process, it became Hanna's first single to enter a main chart in Oceania.

== Charts ==
Chart (2019)	Peak position
New Zealand Hot Singles (RMNZ)	32
Scotland (Official Charts Company)	80
UK Download (Official Charts Company)	97
US Digital Songs (Billboard)	31

== Release history ==
Territory	Date	Format(s)	Ref.
Various	February 1, 2019	Digital download; streaming	
United States	February 5, 2019	Contemporary hit radio	
