= Just Go (Goodbye's the New Hello) =

- Digital cover and original version.

Studio album by Rania
- Released: March 8, 2013
- Recorded: 2012–2013
- Genre: K-pop; dance-pop; electropop; hip hop
- Length: 36:39
- Label: DR; Yedang
- Producer: Yang Hyun-suk; Teddy Riley; Brave Brothers

Rania chronology
Time to Rock da Show (2011)	Just Go (Goodbye's the New Hello) (2013)	Demonstrate (2015)

Singles from Just Go (Goodbye's the New Hello)
- 1. "Style" Released: September 21, 2012; 2. "Just Go" Released: March 8, 2013

Just Go (Goodbye's the New Hello) is the debut studio album by South Korean girl group, Rania, released on March 8, 2013, through DR Music and Yedang Entertainment. The album was the last to feature members Riko, Jooyi, and Saem, though the latter would rejoin the group in 2016 as Yina.

Member Jooyi was on hiatus during the recording of Style, while Riko departed the group shortly before the album's release.

== Reception ==
Just Go (Goodbye's the New Hello) remains Rania's highest-charting release, peaking at #9 on the GAON Chart, and sold 2,582 copies. "Just Go" and "Style" also peaked on the GAON digital charts and the Billboard Korea K-pop Hot 100 Chart.

== Track listing ==
No.	Title	Writer(s)	Arrangement	Length
1.	"Just Go"	A. Wright	Brian Kierulf, Joshua Schwartz, KNS Productions, A. Wright	3:08
2.	"Secret Party"	A. Wright	Sam Shrieve, Matthew Steeper, Joren Van Der Voort	3:54
3.	"Killer"	Mio Isayama	Labyron Walton	3:13
4.	"Style"	Tablo	P.K.	3:22
5.	"Dr. Feel Good"	Richard Garcia, Rosel A Minster, Dominique Rodriguez, Jessica Bryant, Teddy Riley	Teddy Riley, Richard Garcia, Rosel A Minster, Dominique Rodriguez, Jessica Bryant	3:09
6.	"Masquerade"			3:12
7.	"Pop Pop Pop"	Brave Brothers	Brave Brothers, War Of The Stars	3:00
8.	"Goodbye"	Brave Brothers, War Of The Stars	Brave Brothers, War Of The Stars	4:06
9.	"Just Go" (English version)	A. Wright, Barnaby Pinny	A Wright., Brian Keirulf, Josh Schwartz	3:08
10.	"Dr. Feel Good" (English version)	Teddy Riley	Teddy Riley, Richard Garcia, Rosel A Minster, Dominique Rodriguez, Jessica Bryant	3:09
11.	"Masquerade" (English version)			3:18
Total length:				36:39
