= Time to Rock da Show =

EP by Rania
- Released: November 17, 2011
- Recorded: 2011
- Genre: K-pop
- Length: 10:58
- Label: DR; Yedang; LOEN
- Producer: Brave Brothers

Rania chronology
Teddy Riley, the First Expansion In Asia (2011)	Time to Rock da Show (2011)	Just Go (Goodbye's the New Hello) (2013)

Singles from Time to Rock da Show
- 1. "Pop Pop Pop" Released: November 16, 2011

Time to Rock da Show is the second extended play by the South Korean girl group Rania. It was released on November 17, 2011. The song "Pop Pop Pop" was used to promote the EP. It was the last EP to feature member Joy who was on hiatus and subsequently departed in late 2011.

== Release ==
The full mini-album was released on November 16, 2011. Promotions for "Pop Pop Pop" began on November 17, 2011, on M! Countdown.

== Track listing ==
No.	Title	Lyrics	Music	Length
1.	"Time To Rock Da Show"	War Of The Stars (별들의 전쟁)	Brave Brothers (용감한 형제), War Of The Stars (별들의 전쟁)	0:50
2.	"Pop Pop Pop"	Brave Brothers (용감한 형제)	Brave Brothers (용감한 형제), War Of The Stars (별들의 전쟁)	3:01
3.	"Goodbye"	Brave Brothers (용감한 형제), War Of The Stars (별들의 전쟁)	Brave Brothers (용감한 형제), War Of The Stars (별들의 전쟁)	4:06
4.	"Pop Pop Pop(Inst)"	-	Brave Brothers (용감한 형제), War Of The Stars (별들의 전쟁)	3:01
Total length:				10:58

== Charts ==
=== Singles chart ===
Song	Peak position
Song	Gaon Chart
"Pop Pop Pop"	66
