= Numedia (Naio Ssaion album) =

Debut album of Slovenian band Naio Ssaion

Studio album by Naio Ssaion
- Released: 13 April 2004
- Genre: Nu metal, Alternative metal

Naio Ssaion chronology
Numedia	Out Loud

Numedia is the debut album of the Slovenian band Naio Ssaion. The album was released in April 2004 by CPZ Publishing and peaked at number fourteen on the Slovenian album chart.

== Track listing ==
1. N.Ss
2. Bla Bla
3. Ailu
4. Ran
5. Sms
6. Gen X
7. Zaika
8. Libero
9. Bordo
10. Homo Sapiens
