= Outloud =

Outloud may refer to:

- Outloud, a band founded by Nile Rodgers, or their 1987 eponymous album
- OutLoud!, a 2008 album by Spensha Baker

== See also ==
- Out Loud (disambiguation)
