= Naio Ssaion =

- Origin: Slovenia
- Genres: Gothic metal, nu metal, experimental rock
- Years active: 1999–2012
- Labels: CPZ, Napalm
- Members: Barbara Jedovnicky (vocals); Rok Kolar (violin); Tine Čas (guitar); Luka Verdnik (guitar); Lenart Jerabek (bass); Mitja Melanšek (drums)
- Website: naiossaion.com

Naio Ssaion is a rock band from Slovenia.

== Overview ==
Naio Ssaion, pronounced (nay-yo say-yon), was officially created in 2003 but the members have been together in other forms since 1999. Naio Ssaion are often thought to have a similar musical style to their contemporaries Lullacry, however the use of a violin gives the band a more unusual lineup and more options, by making use of many violin solos.

Naio Ssaion’s first release, titled Numedia and sung solely in Slovenian, was released in April 2004 by CPZ Publishing. The album peaked to No. 14 in the Slovenian album charts. Making a name for themselves through many triumphs in international band competitions, this chance of a lifetime was a turning point for the band and the beginning of an international musical career that prompted them to sign a worldwide recording contract with Napalm Records.

In 2005, Naio Ssaion completed work on their Napalm Records debut album to be released on 25 November. Out Loud has been described as a refined mix of modern and powerful rock songs featuring spellbinding vocals and sensational violin arrangements. It received a rating of eight from Blabbermouth, and 3.5 from AllMusic. The band stresses that they will not include songs on an album which they would not wish to play live.

== Current members ==
- Barbara Jedovnicky : vocals
- Rok Kolar : electric violin
- Tine čas : guitar
- Luka Verdnik : guitar
- Lenart Jerabek : bass
- Mitja Melanšek - mic : drums

== Discography ==
=== Albums ===
- Numedia (CPZ Publishing) 2004
- Out Loud (Napalm Records) 2005

=== Singles ===
- Remix (CPZ Publishing) 2004
1. Blah-Blah (Schatzi Remix)
2. Libero (3xyz Remix) + rozmarinke
