= Teddy Riley, the First Expansion In Asia =

EP by Rania
- Released: April 6, 2011
- Recorded: 2011
- Genres: K-pop; dance-pop; electropop; hip hop
- Length: 10:58
- Labels: DR; Yedang
- Producer: Teddy Riley

Rania chronology
Teddy Riley, the First Expansion In Asia (2011)	Time to Rock da Show (2011)

Singles from Teddy Riley, the First Expansion In Asia
- 1. "Dr. Feel Good" Released: April 6, 2011; 2. "Masquerade" Released: June 13, 2011

Alternative cover

Teddy Riley, the First Expansion In Asia is the debut extended play by South Korean girl group, Rania, released on April 6, 2011, by DR Music and Yedang Company, it is the only EP to feature member Yijo as she left the group due to visa issues.

== Background ==
The album's single, "Masquerade," was composed, written, and produced by Teddy Riley, who originally made the song for Lady Gaga.

== Promotion ==
Rania promoted their debut with showcases in Thailand, Cambodia, Singapore, the Philippines, Taiwan, Hong Kong, Malaysia, Indonesia, Laos, and Vietnam. Member Yijo was absent in promotions due to visa issues.

== Critical reception ==
Rania's debut was met with mixed reviews in Korea, as many viewers found the group's image too provocative. As a result, Rania were forced to change their choreography and make minor changes to the outfits. Riley himself announced he would disassociate himself with the group as he believed that the group and comeback were attempts to use him for his name and status. Despite this, singles "Dr. Feel Good" and "Masquerade both charted at 99 and 192 on the GAON chart respectively.

== Track list ==
No.	Title	Writer(s)	Arrangement	Length
1.	"Dr. Feel Good"	Richard Garcia, Rosel A Minster, Dominique Rodriguez, Jessica Bryant, Teddy Riley	Teddy Riley, Richard Garcia, Rosel A Minster, Dominique Rodriguez, Jessica Bryant	3:32
2.	"Masquerade"			3:13
3.	"Dr. Feel Good" (English version)	Teddy Riley	Teddy Riley, Richard Garcia, Rosel A Minster, Dominique Rodriguez, Jessica Bryant	3:54
4.	"Masquerade" (English version)			3:20
5.	"Dr. Feel Good" (Instrumental)			3:32
6.	"Masquerade" (Instrumental)			3:20
