= Start a Fire (BP Rania EP) =

- Digital and physical only.

EP by BP Rania
- Released: December 30, 2016
- Recorded: 2016
- Genre: K-pop; dance-pop; electropop; hip hop
- Length: 14:26
- Label: DR; Danal; INGENIOmedia
- Producer: Labyron Walton

BP Rania chronology
Demonstrate (2015)	Start a Fire (2016)	Refresh 7th (2017)

Singles from Start a Fire
- 1. "Start a Fire" Released: December 30, 2016

Start a Fire is the fourth extended play by South Korean girl group, BP Rania, released by DR Music and distributed by Danal Entertainment and INGeNIOmedia. The EP was the first release as BP Rania with the returned of Yina, who previously departure in 2013 and addition of three new member Yumin, Ttabo, and Jieun.

== Background information ==
DR Music originally announced that Rania would be making a comeback in April, followed by the debut of a new unit featuring Hyemi and Alex. However, both plans were delayed following the departure of members Di, Xia, and T-ae on May 26, 2016. On October 27, 2016, DR Music announced that Rania would be undergoing member changes for their next comeback, citing that they planned to choose from 7 trainees to see who would be the best fit for the group. On December 23, the first teasers began surfacing on Twitter starting with Hyeme and Jieun, alongside a silhouette teaser that revealed 4 additional members being added to the group. On October 27, it was announced the group would be rebranding to BP Rania with the new lineup, also announcing that the new EP would feature the works of composers A-Dee, Lena Leon, and Krysta Youngs, as well as producer Labyron Walton.

== Track listing ==
No.	Title	Writer(s)	Arrangement	Length
1.	"Start a Fire"	Alexandra Reid, Nassun	Chris Sena	3:36
2.	"Make Me Ah"	Alexandra Reid, Peter Pan, Park Hyun Joong	A-Dee	3:59
3.	"Killer" (Remix ver.)	Mio Isayama	Labryon Walton	3:07
4.	"Start a Fire" (Eng ver.)	Alexandra Reid, Nassun, Lena Leon	Chris Sena	3:00
Total length:				14:26
