= Killing Me (Chung Ha song) =

2021 single by Chung Ha

- Digital cover

Single by Chung Ha
- Language: Korean; English
- Released: November 29, 2021
- Studio: Ingrid (Seoul)
- Genre: Dance-pop
- Length: 2:44
- Label: MNH; Stone
- Composers: Musikality; Celine Svanbäck; Jeppe London; Mich Hansen; Sam Merrifield
- Lyricists: Chung Ha; Jo Yoon-kyung
- Producers: Musikality; Jeppe London; Cutfather

Chung Ha singles chronology
"Bad Girl" (2021)	"Killing Me" (2021)	"White Lily" (2022)

Chung Ha chronology
Querencia (2021)	Killing Me (2021)	Bare & Rare (2022)

Music video
- "Killing Me" (MNH) on YouTube "Killing Me" (Stone) on YouTube

"Killing Me" is a song by South Korean singer Chung Ha. It was released as a special single on November 29, 2021, through MNH Entertainment, and Stone Music Entertainment.

== Background ==
On November 19, 2021, Chung Ha announced that she will be releasing a special single titled "Killing Me" on November 29.

== Composition and lyrics ==
"Killing" was written by Chung Ha and Jo Yoon-kyung, and composed by Musikality, Celine Svanbäck, Jeppe London, Mich Hansen, and Sam Merrifield. It runs for two minutes and forty-four seconds. The song is up-tempo pop and uses synth to transition to an EDM-heavy chorus. Lyrically it compares the monotony and helplessness of life, particularly that caused by the COVID-19 pandemic, to a tunnel and speaks of the light at the end.

== Critical reception ==
Professional ratings
Review scores
Source	Rating
IZM	3.5/5 stars
NME	4/5 stars

Following its release, music critics gave "Killing Me" positive reviews. Lim Dong-yeop, writing for IZM, commented that the accompaniment and music "capture the overall atmosphere" and said that Chung Ha successfully conveys hope through "Killing Me". Angela Patricia Suacillo of NME praised the production, particularly the synth transition to an EDM chorus and the "sleek drop" that drives the vocals. Suacillo also wrote that the combination of Chung Ha's vocals and the music video made for "a powerful track that speaks to the collective hurt for the times."

== Music video ==
The music video was released on November 29, 2021. In the video, Chung Ha attempts to recover from a breakup, partying with friends. However, she ultimately sits on a couch alone in the middle of the party.

== Credits and personnel ==
- Chung Ha – vocals, lyrics
- Kim Yeon-seo – background vocals
- Jo Yoon-kyung – lyrics
- Musikality – composition, arrangement
- Celine Svanbäck – composition
- Jeppe London – composition, arrangement
- Mich Hansen – composition
- Sam Merrifield – composition
- Cutfather – arrangement
- Jeong Eun-kyung (Ingrid Studio) – recording
- Alwan (Alawn Music Studios) – mixing
- Kwon Nam-woo (821 Mastering Sound) – mastering

== Charts ==
Chart performance for "Killing Me"
Chart (2021)	Peak position
South Korea (Gaon)	102
South Korea (K-pop Hot 100)	69
South Korean Albums (Gaon)	11
US World Digital Song Sales (Billboard)	9

== Release history ==
Release formats for "Killing Me"
Region	Date	Format	Label	Ref.
Various	November 29, 2021	CD; download; streaming	MNH; Stone Music	
