= Mujuk =

- Digital cover

EP by Evolution
- Released: October 11, 2023
- Genre: K-pop
- Length: 22:37
- Languages: Korean; English
- Labels: Modhaus; Kakao

TripleS chronology
| Muhan (2023) | Mujuk (2023) | Just Do It (2023) |

Singles from Mujuk
- 1. "Invincible" Released: October 11, 2023

Mujuk (stylized as ⟡) is the first extended play by South Korean girl group Evolution, a sub-unit of TripleS consisting of members Kim Yoo-yeon, Mayu, Kim Na-kyoung, Kotone, Kim Chae-yeon, Lee Ji-woo, Kim Soo-min, Kwak Yeon-ji. It was released on October 11, 2023, by Modhaus and distributed by Kakao Entertainment. The album contains eight tracks, including the title track "Invincible".

== Promotion and release ==
On October 11, 2023, Evolution made their official debut with the EP Mujuk and its accompanying title track, "Invincible".

== Track listing ==
| No. | Title | Lyrics | Music | Length |
|---|---|---|---|---|
| 1. | "Mujuk" | | Badd, G-High (Monotree) | 0:51 |
| 2. | "Invincible" | G-High (Monotree), Jaden Jeong | G-High (Monotree), Justin Reinstein, Suhyppy, Anna Timgren | 3:17 |
| 3. | "Rhodanthe" | Choi Hyun-jun (V.O.S), Kim Seung-soo | Choi Hyun-jun (V.O.S), Kim Seung-soo | 3:47 |
| 4. | "Heavy Metal Wings" | Jeon Ji Eun; Jaden Jeong | Kz, Kim Tae-yeong, Sofia Vivere, Dint | 3:15 |
| 5. | "37.5 Celsius" (미열 37.5) | Gdlo (Monotree), Emily Yeonseo Kim | Emily Yeonseo Kim | 3:41 |
| 6. | "Moto Princess" | Park So-hyun, Jaden Jeong | Badd, San Yoon, Maria Marcus, Mlc | 3:14 |
| 7. | "Oui" | G-High (Monotree), Janet Suhh (The Hub) | G-High (Monotree), Janet Suhh (The Hub), Liam J Dowell | 2:39 |
| 8. | "Enhanced Flower" (sung by Lee Ji-woo) | G-High (Monotree) | G-High (Monotree), Shannon | 1:53 |
| Total length: | | | | 22:37 |

=== Notes ===
- "Mujuk" is stylized as "⟡".

== Controversy ==
The song "Rhodanthe" was initially accused of plagiarizing Iz*One's hit song "Fiesta." However, the plagiarism allegations were quickly dismissed when it was discovered that both songs were composed by the same composers, Choi Hyun-jun and Kim Seung-soo. The issue was then reclassified as a lack of originality in the song's creative process rather than plagiarism.

== Charts ==
Weekly chart performance for Mujuk
| Chart (2023) | Peak position |
|---|---|
| South Korean Albums (Circle) | 12 |

== Release history ==
Release history for Mujuk
| Region | Date | Format | Label |
|---|---|---|---|
| South Korea | October 11, 2023 | CD; digital download; streaming | ModHaus; Kakao Entertainment |
| Various | October 11, 2023 | Digital download; streaming | ModHaus; Kakao Entertainment |
