= Honestly and Honestly (Encore) =

2018 songs by Gabbie Hanna

"Honestly/Honestly (Encore)"
- "Honestly" cover

Single by Gabbie Hanna
- Released: August 15, 2018
- Genre: Pop punk
- Length: 2:56 ("Honestly"); 1:35 ("Honestly (Encore)")
- Label: Independent
- Songwriters: Gabbie Hanna; Lyre
- Producer: Lyre

Gabbie Hanna singles chronology
"Satellite" (2017)	"Honestly/Honestly (Encore)" (2018)	"Monster/Monster (Reborn)" (2018)

Audio samples
- "Honestly": file; help
- "Honestly (Encore)": file; help

Music video
- "Honestly / Honestly (Encore)" on YouTube

Alternative cover
- "Honestly (Encore)" cover

"Honestly" is a song recorded by American Internet personality and singer Gabbie Hanna. It was independently released for digital download on August 15, 2018 simultaneously with its encore titled "Honestly (Encore)". Both tracks were written by Hanna and Lyre, while production was solely handled by the latter. The inspiration for their lyrics derives from a relationship the singer had had with a pathological liar. Musically, "Honestly" has been described as a pop punk song in which Hanna belts about empowerment. A music critic noted an "ominous and aggressive vibe".

A double music video for "Honestly" and "Honestly (Encore)" was uploaded onto Hanna's YouTube channel on the same day of the songs' digital release and was directed by Ryan Parma. It features her performing choreography, and eventually she is shown tied up to a rack by white cloths and struggling to get away from two men. Reviewers praised the clip, with one comparing Hanna's dancing to that of Beyoncé. Commercially, "Honestly" entered the download charts in Canada, the United Kingdom and the United States, and peaked at number 21 on Billboard's Bubbling Under Hot 100 Singles chart as well as at number 61 in Scotland. In the same territory, "Honestly (Encore)" peaked at number 86. For further promotion, Hanna delivered a live performance of "Honestly" at VidCon 2018 in Australia.

== Background and composition ==
"Honestly" was independently released for digital download on August 15, 2018 simultaneously with its encore titled "Honestly (Encore)". Both were written by Hanna and Lyre, while production was solely handled by the latter. In a Carpool Karaoke video on YouTube with Ricky Dillon, Hanna revealed that initially "Honestly" featured drastically different lyrics. The songs were inspired by a pathological liar the singer had dated; she detailed the relationship in a series of videos she posted on YouTube in July 2018. She further wrote on her Instagram: "'Honestly' and 'Honestly (Encore)' are songs for anyone who's ever been manipulated, lied to, gaslighted, or made to feel like they were crazy. Anyone ever associated with a narcissist."

"Honestly" is a pop punk song, in which Hanna also touches on empowerment topics. According to Geoff Weiss of Tubefilter, "Honestly" and "Honestly (Encore)" show an "ominous and aggressive vibe". Lyrics from the first verse of "Honestly" include: "Your words don't hold any weight, I can't seem to get a straight answer. Don't trust you, but who's to blame?" In the pre-chorus, Hanna sings: "Got me second guessin' everything you say, Thinkin' that I know you, but you're really a stranger. Doin' what you gotta do to get your way. You're reckless and selfish and you can't help it". She continues belting in the refrain: "Say you're talkin' to me honestly, but you're lyin' to me constantly". In the bridge, Hanna asserts that she "[doesn't] know what's reality".

== Commercial performance ==
Upon its release, both "Honestly" and "Honestly (Encore)" achieved success on digital platforms. "Honestly" peaked on Billboard's US Bubbling Under Hot 100 Singles chart at number 21, although only released in the sixth day of the respective sales and streaming tracking period. The song further peaked at number ten on the country's Digital Songs chart with 16,000 copies sold, and reached number 61 in Scotland, number 24 on Canada's Hot Digital Song Sales chart, and number 81 on the British downloads ranking. In addition, "Honestly (Encore)" peaked at number 86 in Scotland. As of 2024, “Honestly” is her highest charting single globally.

== Promotion ==
A double music video for "Honestly" and "Honestly (Encore)" was uploaded onto Hanna's YouTube channel on August 15, 2018, lasting around five minutes. It was directed and edited by Ryan Parma. During the first half of the visual, Hanna is shown sporting a black outfit, performing choreography done by Megan Batoon in front of a wall or flashing lights. During a scene, the singer is dancing around a black chair until kicking it away. Towards the end, she is shown with two other females—Helene Britany and Julia Oste—after the video cuts to her tied up, foreshadowing the second half of the video.

During the video's second half, Hanna sports deranged-looking eye makeup and is tied up to a rack by white cloths. She struggles to get away from two men—Dalton Shooks and Jake Brandorff—who are constantly seen touching her. According to Dana Getz of PopCrush, this aesthetic represents the singer being lost in a "web of lies". Matt Gehring of MTV praised the clip's concept and said that it was "executed with perfection". Emy LaCroix of Life & Style echoed Gehring's thought and labelled Hanna's dancing as "Beyoncé-esque". For further promotion of "Honestly", Hanna performed it live at VidCon 2018 in Melbourne, Australia.

== Track listing ==
- "Honestly"
1. "Honestly" – 2:56
- "Honestly (Encore)"
1. "Honestly (Encore)" – 1:35

== Charts ==
=== "Honestly" ===
Chart (2018)	Peak position
Canadian Hot Digital Song Sales (Billboard)	24
Scotland (Official Charts Company)	61
UK Download (Official Charts Company)	81
US Bubbling Under Hot 100 Singles (Billboard)	21
US Digital Songs (Billboard)	10

=== "Honestly (Encore)" ===
Chart (2018)	Peak position
Scotland (Official Charts Company)	86

== Release history ==
Territory	Date	Format(s)	Label	Version	Ref.
Various	August 15, 2018	Digital download	Independent	"Honestly"	
Various	August 15, 2018	Digital download	Independent	"Honestly (Encore)"	
