= Sparkling (Chung Ha song) =

2022 single by Chung Ha

Single by Chung Ha
- Language: Korean; English
- Released: July 11, 2022
- Genre: Dance-pop
- Length: 3:06
- Label: MNH; Stone
- Composers: BXM; Prime Time
- Lyricists: Chung Ha; BXM; Jo Yoon-kyung
- Producer: BXM

Chung Ha singles chronology
"Color Me" (2022)	"Sparkling" (2022)	"Eenie Meenie" (2024)

Music video
- "Sparkling" (MNH) on YouTube "Sparkling" (Stone) on YouTube

"Sparkling" is a song by South Korean singer Chung Ha. It was released on July 11, 2022, through MNH and 88rising as the title track from Chung Ha's second Korean-language studio album, Bare & Rare.

== Composition and lyrics ==
"Sparkling" was written by Chung Ha and BXM, and composed by BXM and Prime Time. It runs for three minutes and six seconds. The lyrics "You make me sparkle, I'll be your sparkle" is like the relationship between Byulharang and Chung Ha, shining on each other. This fetching piece features sound like a refreshing soda pop, with its identity of hyper-vibe on top of a fast BPM around 160. Like the first sip of an ice cold drink on a hot summer day, the song expresses the clear and cool feeling of a cold and tangy pop. The fast mood could easily seem as light but by capturing the fast mood with Chung Ha's strong voice, this cool and sparkle track was completed. The arpeggio of the analog synthesizer achieves harmony with the retro but trendy drumline, and by adding in the electric guitar, the chorus also realizes a tough but witty rich sound. And Chung Ha's chameleonic changes in emotions corresponding with the lyrics can be a key point of this song.

== Credits and personnel ==
Credits adapted from the description section of the music video and Melon.

- Lyrics by BXM and Chung Ha
- Composed by BXM and Prime Time
- Arranged by BXM
- Drums Performed by Hangsuk Jwa
- EP Performed by Gilbeom Lee
- Guitar Performed by Moohyuk Byun
- Background vocals by Ashley Alisha and Chung Ha
- Directed by BXM and Fuxxy
- Recorded by Jung Eunkyeng at Ingrid Studio
- Mixed by DRK (Assist. Kim Junsang, Ji Minwoo) @ Koko Sound Studio
- Mastered by Kwon Nam Woo @ 821 Sound Mastering

== Charts ==
=== Weekly charts ===
Chart performance for "Sparkling"
Chart (2022)	Peak position
South Korea (Billboard)	22
South Korea (Circle)	44

=== Monthly charts ===
Monthly chart performance for "Sparkling"
Chart (2022)	Position
South Korea (Circle)	60

== Accolades ==
Music program awards (1 total)
Program	Date	Ref.
The Show	July 19, 2022	

== Release history ==
Release formats for "Sparkling"
Region	Date	Format	Label	Ref.
Various	July 11, 2022	CD; download; streaming	MNH; Stone Music; 88rising	
