= Bare & Rare =

2022 studio album by Chung Ha

- Part 1 digital cover

Studio album by Chung Ha
- Released: July 11, 2022
- Recorded: 2021
- Studio: MNH Studios
- Genre: Pop
- Length: 25:23
- Languages: Korean; English
- Labels: MNH; 88rising
- Producer: Chungha

Chung Ha chronology
Killing Me (2021)	Bare & Rare (2022)	Eenie Meenie (2024)

Singles from Bare & Rare
- 1. "Sparkling" Released: July 11, 2022

Bare & Rare is the second studio album by South Korean singer Chung Ha. The first part was released on July 11, 2022, under MNH Entertainment and 88rising.

== Background ==
On June 27, 2022, Chung Ha revealed a detailed teaser schedule for the first part of her second studio album, titled Bare & Rare. The mood sampler in "Bare" version was uploaded on June 28. It showcased a "dreamy" and "mechanical" sound with a "strange" tension. On June 30, the official photo of "Bare #1" was released, showing Chung Ha in silhouette along with vintage colours and natural styling, while the "Bare #2" was released on July 1. The teaser images for the lead single "Sparkling" were released on July 2, which were said to have an "enchanting" atmosphere. The second image depicts the singer in a red dress surrounded by flowers. The track list for the album was released on July 4, with the highlight medley being released two days later on July 6. The music video teaser was released on July 8 and 9 respectively. Countdown posters were released on July 9 and 10 respectively before the official D-day countdown poster and album was released on July 11, 2022.

== Composition ==
The album consists of 8 tracks, all of which were co-produced and co-written by Chung Ha. The album includes: "XXXX", "Sparkling", "Louder" "California Dream", "Good Night My Princess", "Love Me Out Loud", "Nuh-Uh" and "Crazy Like You" featuring 88rising labelmate Bibi. The album marks Chung Ha's first full comeback after her first full-length album Querencia which was released in 2021.

"Louder" is a catchy pop track with bouncy beats and twinkling effects. Chung Ha aims to encourage listeners to stop apologising for the space they take up and start owning their strength.

The lead single "Sparkling" was considered a change to Chung Ha's previous music style.

== Conception ==
At a press conference in Seoul, Chung Ha shared her feelings about the album and reflected on her previous works, citing that she "felt empty for some reason".

"I realized that while I've been a singer for the past few years, I had never really expressed my personal memories through my music. So far, I thought of myself as a performer; someone who performs the stage routine and lyrics that others designed for me. For this album, I wanted to fill it up with my innermost stories. I asked myself what was causing that feeling, and I thought of the times that I sang lyrics that I couldn't relate to, or wanted to change some musical aspects in my songs. So I really wanted to tell my own story this time."

— Chung Ha explaining her thoughts on the album

== Release and promotion ==
Prior to the release of the album, Chung Ha performed "California Dream" on June 25, 2022, at the Seoul Waterbomb Festival 2022. The album initially was announced as a double album, with a second part of the album being scheduled for release in late 2022. A release of the second part of the project failed to materialize in 2022. Chung Ha's departure from her label MNH Entertainment was announced in January 2023, her contract with the label expired in April 2023. The status of the project is unknown.

== Critical reception ==
Professional ratings
Review scores
Source	Rating
IZM	2.5/5 stars
NME	3/5 stars

Tanu I. Raj of NME gave 3 out of 5 stars while stating that "the K-pop soloist's second studio album stumbles occasionally but displays her complexity and commendable desire to grow".

=== Year-end lists ===
Publication	List	Rank	Ref.
Idology	Top 20 Albums of 2022	Placed	

== Track listing ==
Bare & Rare Part 1 track listing
No.	Title	Lyrics	Music	Arrangement	Length
1.	"XXXX"	Chungha; Sophia Pae; Fuxxy; Any Masingga; Ximon; Winnie	Fuxxy; Any Masingga	Any Masingga; Fuxxy	2:48
2.	"Sparkling"	BXN; Chung Ha	BXN; Prime Time	BXN	3:06
3.	"Louder"	Chung Ha; Alma Goodman; Klara Elias; Tushar Apte	Tushar Apte; Alma Goodman; Klara Elias	Tushar Apte	2:59
4.	"Crazy Like You" (featuring Bibi)	Chung Ha; Bibi; Luvssong; Ryan Jhun; Kloe; Sam Preston; Rick Parkouse; George Tizzard	Ryan Jhun; Kloe; Sam Preston; Rick Parkhouse; George Tizzard	Jhun; Red Triangle	2:55
5.	"California Dream"	Chungha	Kella Armitage; Josh McClelland; Gus Ross	Gus Ross	2:59
6.	"Good Night My Princess"	Chung Ha; Jo Yoon-kyung	Lee Hyun-sang (Artmatic); Choi Ji-san (Artmatic); Adora	Lee; Choi	3:52
7.	"Love Me Out Loud"	Chung Ha; Jo Yoon-kyung	Peter Wallevik; Daniel Davidson; Mich Hansen; Neil Omandy; Phil Plested	PhD; Cutfather	3:24
8.	"Nuh-Uh"	Chung Ha; Lee Seu-ran; Fuxxy; Any Masingga	Fuxxy; Any Masingga; Alina Smith	Any Masingga; Fuxxy	3:20
Total length:					25:23

== Charts ==
=== Weekly charts ===
Chart performance for Bare & Rare Pt. 1
Chart (2022)	Peak position
South Korean Albums (Circle)	15

=== Monthly charts ===
Monthly chart performance for Bare & Rare Pt. 1
Chart (2022)	Peak position
South Korean Albums (Circle)	57

== Release history ==
Release dates and formats for Bare & Rare
Region	Date	Format	Label	Ref.
Various	July 11, 2022	CD; digital download; streaming	MNH; 88rising	
South Korea	July 11, 2022	CD; digital download; streaming	MNH; Stone; Genie	
