= Fatou Samba =

Senegalese-Belgian musician (born 1995)

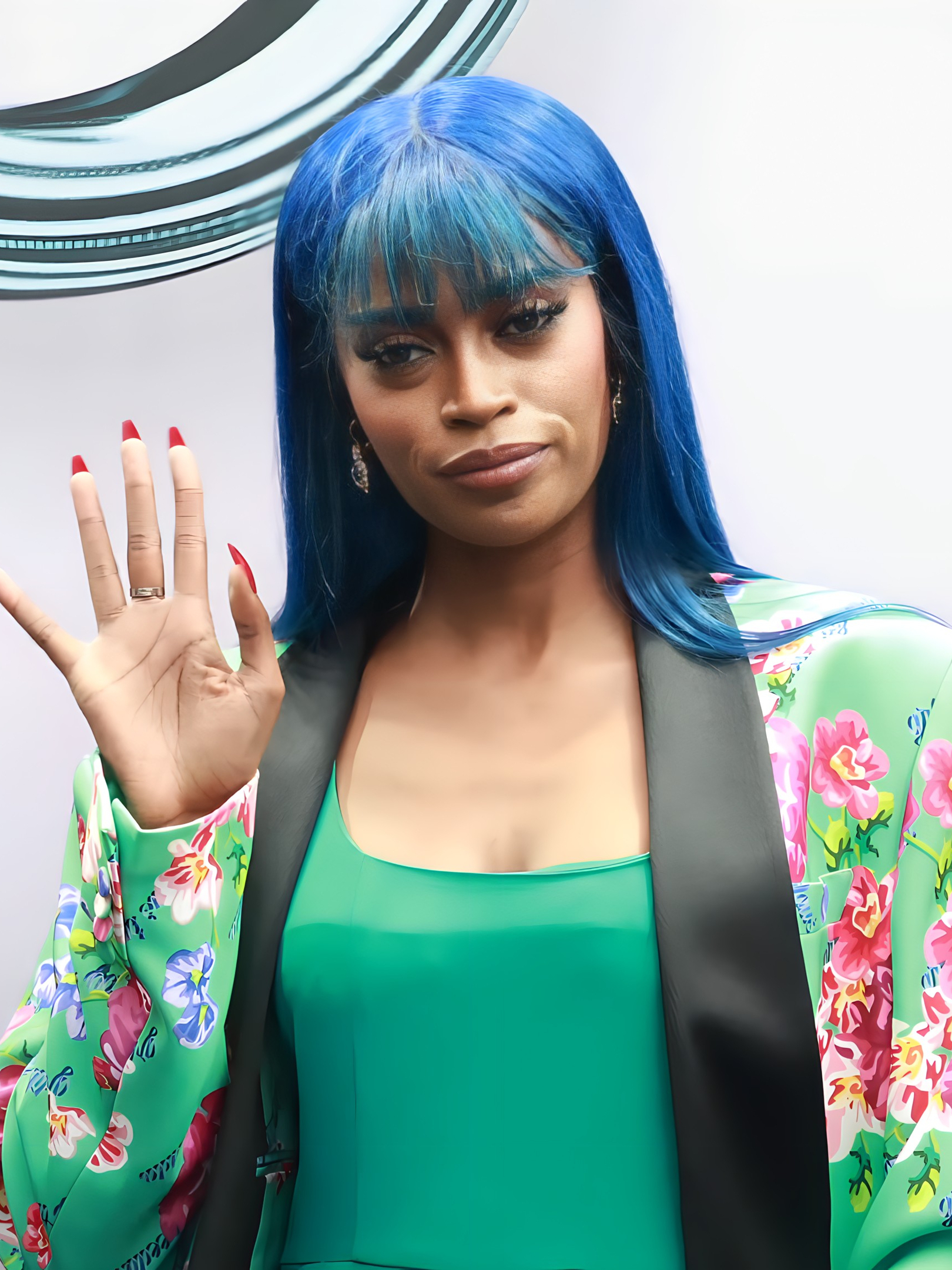
- Fatou in September 2024
- Born: Fatou Diouf Samba; March 23, 1995 (age 31); Dakar, Senegal
- Occupations: Rapper; singer
- Years active: 2020–present
- Musical career
- Genres: K-pop
- Instrument: Vocals
- Years active: 2020–present
- Label: DR Music
- Member of: Blackswan

Fatou Diouf Samba (born March 23, 1995), known mononymously as Fatou, is a Senegalese-Belgian rapper, singer-songwriter, and model based in South Korea. She is best known as a member and leader of the girl group Blackswan, being widely recognized as the first African-born idol in the South Korean music industry.

On August 19, 2022, Fatou made her solo debut with the mixtape PWAPF.

== Biography ==
Fatou was born on March 23, 1995, in Senegal. She later moved to Belgium at the age of 12, where she pursued a career in modeling. She became inspired to pursue a career in the K-pop industry after being shown Shinee's "Replay" by a friend, travelling to South Korea following her graduation from university, and joining a K-pop cover dance crew.

After two years of training, Fatou made her debut in the South Korean girl group Blackswan on October 16, 2020. In August 2022, it was announced that Fatou would be making her solo debut with her first mixtape, PWAPF. She later returned in December 2023 with her first EP, Letter 1 - Adeah.

== Discography ==
=== EPs and mixtapes ===
List of extended plays, with selected details, chart positions, and sales
Title	Album details	Peak chart positions			Sales
Title	Album details	KOR	US Heat	US World	Sales
PWAPF	Released: August 19, 2022; Label: DR Music, Danal Entertainment; Format: Digital download; Track listing: 1. Castle Key (Roll); 2. Gucci (PWAPF)"; 3. Lingo (Stunna)	—	—	—	—N/a
Letter 1 - Adaeh	Released: December 8, 2023; Label: DR Music, Danal Entertainment; Formats: CD, digital download; Track listing: 1. The Other Side; 2. Devil Made the Deal for Me; 3. Adaeh; 4. Me Myself and I 5. Alright	—	—	—	

== Filmography ==
=== Television shows ===
Year	Title	Role	Notes	Ref.
2024	Gone PD	Cast Member		
