= Leia (singer) =

Brazilian and Japanese musician (born 2001)

- カルテス・ラリッサ
- Born: Larissa Ayumi Cartes Sakata; May 14, 2001 (age 25); Curitiba, Brazil
- Citizenship: Brazil; Japan
- Occupations: Rapper; singer; dancer
- Years active: 2020–present
- Musical career
- Genres: Pop; K-pop
- Instrument: Vocals
- Years active: 2020–present
- Label: DR Music
- Formerly of: Blackswan

Japanese name
- Kanji: 坂田あゆみ
- Hiragana: さかた あゆみ
- Katakana: カルテス・ラリッサ
Transcriptions
- Romanization: Karutesu Rarissa

Larissa Ayumi Cartes Sakata (カルテス・ラリッサ, Karutesu Rarissa; born May 14, 2001) (Note: Japanese pronunciation: [ɾaɾisːa kaɾɯtesɯ]; alternatively 라리사 카르테스, Hepburn: Rarisa Kareuteseu, Korean pronunciation: [ɾaɾisʰa kʰaɾɯtʰesʰɯ]), known mononymously as Leia (Korean: 레아; Japanese: レア), is a Brazilian and Japanese rapper, singer and dancer based in South Korea. She is best known for being a member of the girl group Blackswan, and is widely recognised as the first Brazilian-born idol in the South Korean music industry.

== Early life and career ==
Leia was born on 14 May 2001 in the city of Curitiba, Paraná. She is the daughter of a Brazilian mother and a Japanese father. By the age of four, Leia was already singing with ease in talent shows in her hometown. Her love of K-pop began when she was 11, and with it came a desire to learn Korean; initially, the singer learnt the language online.

Leia is multilingual and speaks Portuguese, English, Korean and Japanese.

Leia travelled to South Korea for the first time in 2013, at the age of 12, after being the only one to pass an audition held by Pledis Entertainment in Curitiba. From her early teens, whilst living outside Seoul, she had to strictly follow the dance and singing rehearsals required by the company, so every day after returning from school, she would record videos to demonstrate her training.

Her debut in Korea was originally set to take place with the final line-up of the group BP Rania in 2020, but the group underwent a rebranding process, bringing an end to their activities as Rania. She was the third member to be revealed for Blackswan on 3 July 2020, via the group’s official Instagram account, where a letter—written in Korean and translated into English—was posted. Leia became the first Brazilian woman to debut in a K-pop girl group.

== Filmography ==
=== Television ===
Year	Title	Role	Notes	References
2020	Save sea Companion	She herself	Episode: "Finding Fellow Travelers"	
