= Gabbie Hanna =

American internet personality and musician

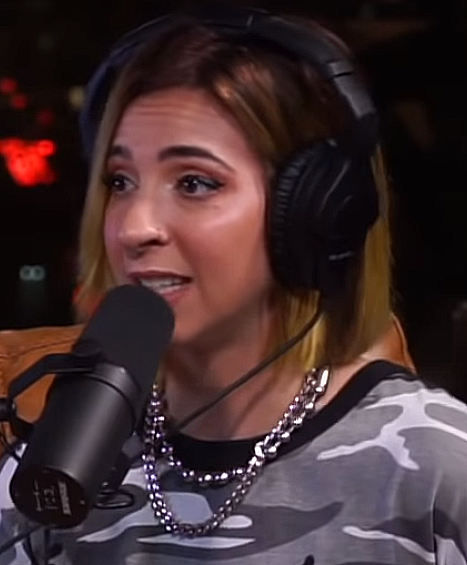
- Hanna in 2019
- Born: Gabrielle Jeanette Hanna; February 7, 1991 (age 35); New Castle, Pennsylvania, US
- Education: University of Pittsburgh
- Occupations: Influencer; YouTuber; singer-songwriter
- Years active: 2013–present
- Spouse: Robbie Kroner (m. 2025)

YouTube information
- Channel: The Gabbie Show
- Genres: Music; comedy; lifestyle
- Subscribers: 4.95 million
- Views: 64.6 million
- Musical career
- Genres: Pop; pop punk; rock
- Last updated: September 27, 2026
- Website: gabbiehannaofficial.com

Gabrielle Jeannette Hanna Kroner (born February 7, 1991) is an American influencer, singer-songwriter, and YouTuber. She rose to prominence on the video platforms Vine and YouTube. She released her debut single, "Out Loud", in 2017, followed by the EPs 2WayMirror (2019) and Bad Karma (2020). She later released her first two studio albums, Trauma Queen and This Time Next Year (both 2022).

== Early life ==
Hanna was born Gabrielle Jeannette Hanna on February 7, 1991, in New Castle, Pennsylvania. She is of French and Polish descent on her mother's side; her father has Lebanese ancestry, and she self-identifies as Middle Eastern. In 2013, Hanna graduated from the University of Pittsburgh (Pitt) with a degree in psychology and communications. While at Pitt, she was a member of Sigma Sigma Sigma sorority. After college, she worked for a marketing company that sold products out of a Sam's Club; she became the top salesperson in the US for the company and moved to Cleveland, Ohio, to help start a new branch of the company. However, she departed after realizing that they relied on a pyramid scheme.

== Career ==
=== Social media ===
Hanna began uploading skits to Vine in late 2013 and later gained recognition for her activity on the Vine app, where she accumulated around five million followers. In 2014, she set up a YouTube channel under the name The Gabbie Show, which was changed to Gabbie Hanna in 2017 after the release of her debut single "Out Loud", but was later changed back to The Gabbie Show in 2021.

In 2015, Hanna and partner Matt Steffanina won the fourth season of the dance competition web-series Dance Showdown. After college, Hanna moved to Los Angeles, California, to work with internet media company BuzzFeed but eventually left to focus on her YouTube and Vine platforms. In December 2015, a video accusing Gabbie Hanna of stealing jokes went viral on Reddit. Hanna responded, stating that she "never ha[s] and never will consider [herself] a comedian".

After Vine shut down in 2016, Hanna focused on YouTube. Meanwhile, she was nominated for two Teen Choice Awards — Choice Web Star: Female and Choice Viner. In late 2016, Hanna joined the lip sync tour Drop the Mic alongside other YouTubers.

A few months later, Creative Artists Agency signed Hanna and she joined MTV's social media team. In June 2017, Hanna joined the main cast of web series Escape the Night as the vaudevillian and appeared in seven episodes. She co-hosted the revival of Total Request Live in October 2017. In January 2018, Hanna was nominated for YouTuber of the Year at the 10th Shorty Awards and for the Social Star Award at the 2018 iHeartRadio Music Awards. At the eighth Annual Streamy Awards, Hanna won an award for Storyteller and was nominated for First Person and Audience Choice: Creator of the Year.

Hanna reprised her role in the fourth season of Escape the Night and portrayed a Hollywood Star. She was nominated for Choice Comedy Web Star at the 2019 Teen Choice Awards.

In late August 2022, Hanna sparked global conversation around mental health challenges by publishing hundreds of controversial social media posts (including posts where she claimed to be the second coming of Jesus) in only a few days.

In 2024, she returned to the internet with an apology video.

=== Music ===
In 2017, Hanna premiered her debut single "Out Loud" along with its music video and announced plans to release an album titled This Time Next Year. In November 2017, she released a non-album single, "Satellite", with an accompanying lyrics video.

Hanna released her third single "Honestly" and its encore "Honestly (Encore)" in August 2018. On a 2018 interview on Genius' Verified, she sang her song "Monster" a cappella but due to technical errors, the microphone was unable to record her voice properly. Fans spliced in clips, including vines and voice distortions, at the point of technical error to create a meme. Hanna has since released merchandise showcasing her singing face during the meme.

On February 2, 2019, Hanna released "Medicate", the first single from her debut extended play titled 2WayMirror. On May 31, 2019, 2WayMirror was released. For a period of time after the songs' release, Hanna peaked at number 5 on Billboard's Top Emerging Artists chart. Hanna headlined at the inaugural Patreon Assembly on November 2, 2019. On November 16, 2019, Hanna released the music video for her song "Broken Girls".

The first single from Hanna's second EP, Bad Karma, "Dandelion", was released on April 17, 2020, and the second single, "Glass House", was released on May 1, 2020. The EP was released on May 15, 2020.

Following multiple controversies with her former friends and collaborators, Hanna has taken extended breaks from social media on a few different occasions. To celebrate New Years, Hanna returned to social media and released "Rewired", a single from her debut album, Trauma Queen. She later announced that she had scrapped This Time Next Year and Trauma Queen would be released on July 22, 2022, putting the album up for pre-order, as well as restarting and rebranding her podcast. Hanna hosted her first live performance since November 2019 on February 22, 2022.

In November 2022, Hanna released "Haircut", the first single from her sophomore album, This Time Next Year. A snippet of the song was first shared to her TikTok profile in November 2022. Following the upload, the song garnered attention across the platform, causing Hanna to release the song. On December 23, 2022, Hanna released This Time Next Year, which peaked at #14 on the US iTunes Chart.

=== Poetry ===
Hanna has published two poetry books, Adultolescence (2017) and Dandelion (2020), both of which are New York Times Best Sellers.

== Personal life ==
Hanna has spoken about having OCD, ADHD, anxiety, and bipolar disorder.

Hanna took a social media hiatus from February 2023 to March 2024. She made her first public appearance since the break in July 2023, joining American rapper Prince EA on his podcast Sauna Sessions, where she cited mental health issues as her reason for stepping away from the public eye. Amid her social media disappearance, she has since re-emerged as a YMCA fitness instructor in her hometown of New Castle, Pennsylvania. She married Robbie Kroner on May 25, 2025.

== Filmography ==
=== Film and television ===
Year	Work	Role	Notes
2014	Access Hollywood	Herself	1 episode
2014–15	Sanders Shorts	Friend, girlfriend	2 episodes
2015	Anxt	Herself	Full series
2015	Teens Wanna Know	Herself	1 episode
2015	Dance Showdown	Herself	Dancer; won the competition
2015	Occupy Alice	Melissa Krass	Short film
2015	Oscar's Hotel for Fantastical Creatures	Snow Pea	1 episode
2015	Janoskians: Untold and Untrue	Herself	
2016	Laid in America	Lindsey	
2016	Dance Showdown	Herself	Judge (6 episodes)
2016	AwesomenessTV's Betch!	Laura	1 episode
2017	Escape the Night	The Vaudevillian	7 episodes (season 2)
2017	Fantasies	Herself	Guest star (1 episode)
2017	MTV Video Music Awards	Herself	Backstage host
2017–18	MTV's Total Request Live	Herself	Rotating co-host
2018	Escape the Night	The Vaudevillian	Season 3 season finale (flashback clip)
2018	Shane Dawson's The Truth About TanaCon	Herself	Miniseries. Cameo in a clip in part 3, "The Real Truth About TanaCon"
2018	MTV's The Vault	Herself	Guest (3 episodes, season 1)
2018	MTV's Creator to Watch	Herself	Special guest (1 episode, season 3). Responsible for choosing the season 3 host, Megan Batoon
2019	Escape the Night	The Hollywood Star	5 episodes (season 4)
2019–2020	All My Plants Are Dead	Herself	Host
2019–2020	Ice Cream Therapy	Gabbie	Series by Funny or Die
2021	Red Table Talk: The Estefans	Herself	Guest

== Discography ==
Gabbie Hanna discography
- Studio albums: 2
- EPs: 2
- Singles: 25
- Music videos: 19
- Promotional singles: 5
- Guest appearances: 1

=== Studio albums ===
Title	Album details
Trauma Queen	Released: July 22, 2022; Label: Independent; Format: Streaming, digital download, CD
This Time Next Year	Released: December 23, 2022; Label: Independent; Format: Streaming, digital download

=== Extended plays ===
Title	EP details	Peak chart positions					
Title	EP details	US	US Indie	US Heat	AUS	BEL (FL)	UK Down.
2WayMirror	Released: May 31, 2019; Label: FrtyFve (Note: 2WayMirror, Bad Karma, and all of Hanna's pre-2021 singles were originally released independently. In February 2021, Hanna signed over her back-catalog to FrtyFve Records; however, Hanna did not sign with the record label, meaning all music released during and after 2021 is an independent release.); Format: Digital download, streaming	126	4	—	76	174	31
Bad Karma	Released: May 15, 2020; Label: FrtyFve; Format: Digital download, streaming	— (Note: Bad Karma failed to chart on the Billboard 200 chart, but reached number 23 on the Top Album Sales component chart.)	—	22	—	—	—

=== Singles ===
==== As lead artist ====
Title	Year	Peak chart positions							Album
Title	Year	US Bub	US Digital	AUS Hit	CAN Digital	NZ Hot	SCO	UK Digital	Album
"Out Loud"	2017	—	30	6	39	—	47	60	Non-album singles
"Satellite"	2017	—	—	—	—	—	65	—	Non-album singles
"Honestly"	2018	21	10	—	24	—	61	81	Non-album singles
"Honestly (Encore)"	2018	—	—	—	—	—	86	—	Non-album singles
"Monster"	2018	—	— (Note: "Monster" failed to chart on the Billboard Digital Songs chart, but reached number 19 on the Pop Digital Songs component chart.)	—	—	—	—	—	Non-album singles
"Monster (Reborn)"	2018	—	—	—	—	—	—	—	Non-album singles
"Medicate"	2019	—	31	—	—	32	80	97	2WayMirror
"Butterflies"	2019	—	—	—	—	37	—	—	2WayMirror
"Dandelion"	2020	—	—	—	—	—	—	—	Bad Karma
"Glass House"	2020	—	—	—	—	—	—	—	Bad Karma
"Call Me Crazy"	2020	—	—	—	—	—	—	—	Non-album singles (Note: "Call Me Crazy" and "Shut Me Up" were originally tracks released for Hanna's album, This Time Next Year, however, the album was delayed and these two tracks were not included on the album.)
"Shut Me Up"	2020	—	—	—	—	—	—	—	Non-album singles
"You Oughta Know"	2021	—	—	—	—	—	—	—	Non-album singles
"Happy (in the End)"	2021	—	—	—	—	—	—	—	Trauma Queen
"Rewired"	2022	—	—	—	—	—	—	—	Trauma Queen
"I Sold My Soul"	2022	—	—	—	—	—	—	—	Trauma Queen
"Head in the Clouds"	2022	—	—	—	—	—	—	—	Trauma Queen
"Trouble"	2022	—	—	—	—	—	—	—	Trauma Queen
"Haircut"	2022	—	—	—	—	—	—	—	This Time Next Year
"Where Did I Go?"	2024	—	—	—	—	—	—	—	TBA
"Creep / Special"	2024	—	—	—	—	—	—	—	TBA
"Everlasting Love"	2024	—	—	—	—	—	—	—	TBA
"My Sun"	2024	—	—	—	—	—	—	—	TBA
"Alone in the Universe"	2024	—	—	—	—	—	—	—	TBA
"Exodus"	2024	—	—	—	—	—	—	—	TBA
"—" denotes a recording that did not chart or was not released in that territory.

==== Promotional singles ====
Title	Year	Peak chart positions		Album
Title	Year	US Comedy Digital	US Rap Digital	Album
"Roast Yourself" (Note: "Roast Yourself" was only available on streaming services for two weeks after its release. It returned to streaming in 2023.)	2018	1	19	Non-album promotional singles
"Antisocial Media" (Note: "Antisocial Media" is the reproduced spoken word rap that was featured in the second part of "Roast Yourself" added to music. It was given a limited release.)	2020	—	—	Non-album promotional singles
"Warning Shots"	2022	—	—	Trauma Queen (Note: "Warning Shots" and "Hangups" were both meant to be pre-release singles for the album. Hanna decided to not release them as such; however, as the songs were already configured to be singles on streaming platforms, they were released separately when the album dropped.)
"Hangups"	2022	—	—	Trauma Queen
"Dandelion (Live in Studio)" (Note: Stylized as "Dandelion - [{(Live in Studio)}]" in official releases.)	2025	—	—	Bad Karma (Note: Live version of the single "Dandelion" (2020).)

=== Guest appearances ===
Title	Year	Artist(s)	Album
"F Pacing"	2021	Landon Tewers	Frontal Lobe Submission

=== Videography ===
Title	Year	Artist(s)	Director(s)
Official music videos as lead artist
"Out Loud"	2017	Gabbie Hanna	None credited
"Roast Yourself (Harder)" (Note: Not to be confused with Hanna's 2016 YouTube exclusive song, "Roast Yourself".)	2018	Gabbie Hanna	Peter Macaluso
"Honestly / Honestly (Encore)"	2018	Gabbie Hanna	Ryan Parma
"Monster / Monster (Reborn)"	2018	Gabbie Hanna	Ryan Parma
"Medicate"	2019	Gabbie Hanna	Ryan Parma
"Butterflies"	2019	Gabbie Hanna	Ryan Parma
"Perfect Day (A True Story)"	2019	Gabbie Hanna	Ryan Parma
"Pillowcase" (Note: The "Pillowcase" music video also features the interlude songs "This Isn't Fun For Me" and "Exhausted".)	2019	Gabbie Hanna	Spencer Sharp
"Broken Girls" (Note: The "Broken Girls" music video also features the intro track "She Wrote It About You?" and the encore/interlude track "Broken Boys".)	2019	Gabbie Hanna	Nayip Ramos
"Dandelion"	2020	Gabbie Hanna	Hok Konishi
"Glass House"	2020	Gabbie Hanna	Hok Konishi
"Bad Karma"	2020	Gabbie Hanna	Hok Konishi
"Special"	2020	Gabbie Hanna	Hok Konishi
"Happy"	2020	Gabbie Hanna	None credited
"Goodbye, for Now"	2020	Gabbie Hanna	None credited
"Call Me Crazy"	2020	Gabbie Hanna	Hok Konishi
"Antisocial Media"	2020	Gabbie Hanna	Jerize Bravo
"Shut Me Up"	2020	Gabbie Hanna	Hok Konishi
"You Oughta Know (Alanis Morissette cover)"	2021	Gabbie Hanna	None credited
Cameo appearance
"Bitch, Please!"	2014	Jessi Smiles	Robert A. Dobbins
"Sad Song"	2017	Scotty Sire	80Fitz
"My Life Sucks" (Lyric Video)	2017	Scotty Sire	80Fitz
"Gateway"	2019	Elli Moore	Nayip Ramos

== Awards and nominations ==
Year	Award	Category	Recipient	Result	Ref.
2016	Shorty Awards	YouTube Comedian	The Gabbie Show	Nominated	
2016	Teen Choice Awards	Choice Web Star: Female	The Gabbie Show	Nominated	
2016	Teen Choice Awards	Choice Viner	The Gabbie Show	Nominated	
2017	Shorty Awards	Vlogger of the Year	The Gabbie Vlogs	Nominated	
2018	iHeartRadio Music Awards	Social Star Award	Gabbie Hanna	Nominated	
2018	Shorty Awards	YouTuber of the Year	Gabbie Hanna	Nominated	
2018	Shorty Awards	Best YouTube Ensemble	Vlog Squad	Won	
2018	Streamy Awards	Creator of the Year	Gabbie Hanna	Nominated	
2018	Streamy Awards	First Person	Gabbie Hanna	Nominated	
2018	Streamy Awards	Storyteller	Gabbie Hanna	Won	
2018	Streamy Awards	Ensemble Cast	David's Vlog	Won	
2019	Teen Choice Awards	Choice Comedy Web Star	Gabbie Hanna	Nominated	
2019	Streamy Awards	Ensemble Cast	Escape the Night: Season 4 (Note: Season 4 of Escape the Night was nominated for multiple awards; however, Ensemble Cast applies to those who starred in the season (including Hanna) instead of just the show itself.)	Nominated	

== Bibliography ==
- Adultolescence. Atria Books. September 19, 2017. ISBN 9781501178320.
- Dandelion. Atria Books. October 13, 2020. ISBN 9781982153380.
