= Out Loud (song) =

2017 song by Gabbie Hanna

Single by Gabbie Hanna
- Released: September 6, 2017
- Recorded: 2017
- Length: 3:18
- Label: Independent
- Songwriters: Gabbie Hanna; Bruce Wiegner
- Producer: Bruce Wiegner

Gabbie Hanna singles chronology
"Out Loud" (2017)	"Satellite" (2017)

Music video
- "Out Loud" on YouTube

"Out Loud" is the debut single by American Internet personality and singer Gabbie Hanna, independently released for digital download on September 6, 2017. It was written by Hanna and Bruce Wiegner, with production solely handled by the latter. The lyrics of the track, a ballad, have been described as emotive. They discuss themes of loss, loneliness and heartbreak. They were inspired by the poems featured in Hanna's 2017 book Adultolescence.

Upon its release, "Out Loud" was met with mixed reviews from music critics, who argued over the track's quality. An accompanying music video was uploaded to Hanna's YouTube channel on October 18, 2017. The visual features her reminiscing memories of her love interest before attending his funeral in a "major plot twist". Commercially, the track attained moderate success on record charts, reaching number 47 on the Scottish Singles Chart and number 30 on Billboard's Digital Songs chart, among others in 2017. For promotion, the singer performed "Out Loud" live at the 2017 and 2018 VidCon events in Australia.

== Background and composition ==
"Out Loud" was independently released for digital download on September 6, 2017. The song was written by Hanna and its producer Bruce Wiegner, acting as her debut single. They began working on the song in July, and Wiegener eventually uploaded a video on his YouTube channel, during which he details on its production. In an interview with Billboard, Hanna elaborated on the release of "Out Loud": "I don't plan on really becoming a musician. I'm not that good; I'm not really a singer [...] I wanted to shock people; I wanted to step outside of the YouTube world and do something that I actually thought was a piece of art".

The "emotive" lyrics of "Out Loud" discuss themes of loss, loneliness and heartbreak, and were inspired by Hanna's poems in her book Adultolescence (2017). "Out Loud" was initially only meant to be released as a one-off promotion for the book. Musically, the ballad features a "sultry, dark melody that builds up to a tidal wave of a chorus".

== Reception ==
Upon its release, "Out Loud" was met with mixed reviews from music critics. Chris DeVille of Stereogum criticized the song, stating that it "plays more like an SNL Digital Short than a legitimate tearjerker". He further likened it to Paris Hilton's "Stars Are Blind" (2006). Tatiana Cirisano of Billboard called it "no joke", and wrote "if listeners find it hard to reconcile the track's theme of loneliness with Hanna's 1.3 million Twitter followers, well, that's kind of the point". Commercially, "Out Loud" attained success on digital platforms in the United States, and went on to reach number 30 on Billboard's Digital Songs chart. It further peaked at number 47 on the Scottish Singles Chart, and appeared at numbers 90 and 39 on download charts in the United Kingdom and Canada, as well as at number six on the Hitseekers chart in Australia.

== Music video and promotion ==
An accompanying music video for "Out Loud" was uploaded to Hanna's YouTube channel on October 18, 2017, and was directed by Tommy Wooldridge, with Dank Brink serving as the director of photography. It was preceded by a lyric video on September 6, 2017, which showed Hanna writhing atop a bed while the track's lyrics appear onscreen in white script. DeVille of Stereogum criticized the lyric video's quality and negatively likened Hanna's appearance to that of American actress Maya Rudolph.

The official music video begins with Hanna in front of a wall full of pictures, picking out multiple ones in which she is seen with her love interest; as she looks at them, the video cuts to footage of them together. Hanna subsequently tears all the photographs apart and falls to the floor crying, as the visual cuts to further memories of them. The second part of the clip features a "major plot twist", in which the singer attends her boyfriend's funeral, wearing a black dress and holding flowers in her hands. For further promotion, Hanna performed "Out Loud" live at VidCon 2017 in Melbourne, Australia, as well as one year later during the same event.

== Track listing ==
- Digital download
1. "Out Loud" – 3:18

== Charts ==
Chart (2017)	Peak position
Australian Hitseekers (ARIA)	6
Canadian Hot Digital Song Sales (Billboard)	39
Scotland (Official Charts Company)	47
UK Download (Official Charts Company)	60
US Digital Songs (Billboard)	30

== Release history ==
Country	Date	Format(s)	Label	Ref.
Various	September 6, 2017	Digital download	Independent	
