= That Karma =

Single album by Blackswan
- Released: May 19, 2023
- Genre: K-pop
- Length: 12:04
- Label: DR; Danal; INGENIOmedia

Blackswan chronology
Close to Me (2021)	That Karma (2023)	Roll Up (2024)

Singles from Karma
- 1. "Karma" Released: May 19, 2023

That Karma - Pop Edition

Singles from That Karma - Pop Edition
- 1. "Cat & Mouse" Released: September 6, 2023

That Karma is the second single album by South Korean girl group, Blackswan, released by DR Music and distributed by Danal Entertainment and INGeNIOmedia. The EP was the first release to feature international members Gabi, Sriya, and NVee, as well as the first group comeback with no Korean members following the departure of Youngheun and Judy. The group's comeback received widespread media attention as a result of the group's multinational lineup.

== Background information ==
On May 10, 2023, it was announced that Blackswan would be releasing their 2nd single album, That Karma, on May 19, 2023. Indian Odia-language actor and producer Samaresh Routray helped the band to shoot the music video in Bhubaneswar.

On September 6, the group returned with a Pop Edition of the album, featuring English versions of "Karma" and "Cat & Mouse", alongside a new track titled "A World Without Pain", created to remember the victims of the 2023 Odisha train collision.

== Reception ==
"Karma" received widespread praise in India, with numerous Indian outlets covering the comeback and Sriya's membership.

== Track listing ==
No.	Title	Writer(s)	Length
1.	"Karma"	A. Wright, Alina Smith, Gisselle Acevedo, JEDI, Shark, Tessie(153/Joombas), 나정아(153/Joombas)	3:16
2.	"Cat & Mouse"	A Wright, Jeff Shum, John Ho, Keith Askey, Rosina "Soaky" Russell, S8S(153/Joombas)	2:46
3.	"Karma (instrumental)"		3:16
4.	"Cat & Mouse (instrumental)"		2:45
Total length:			12:04

That Karma - Pop Edition
No.	Title	Length
1.	"Karma (English version)"	3:15
2.	"Cat & Mouse (English version)"	2:45
3.	"A World Without Pain"	3:22
Total length:		9:22
