= Muhan (EP) =

- Digital cover

EP by Lovelution
- Released: August 17, 2023
- Genre: K-pop
- Length: 19:43
- Language: Korean; English
- Label: Modhaus; Kakao

TripleS chronology
Cherry Gene (2023)	Muhan (2023)	Mujuk (2023)

Singles from Muhan
- 1. "Girls' Capitalism" Released: August 17, 2023

Muhan (stylized as ↀ) is the first extended play by South Korean girl group Lovelution, a sub-unit of TripleS consisting of members Yoon Seo-yeon, Jeong Hye-rin, Gong Yu-bin, Kaede, Seo Da-hyun, Nien, Park So-hyun, and Xinyu. It was released on August 17, 2023, by Modhaus and distributed by Kakao Entertainment. The album contains seven tracks, including the title track "Girls' Capitalism".

== Promotion and release ==
On August 17, 2023, Lovelution made their official debut with the EP Muhan and its accompanying title track, "Girls' Capitalism".

== Critical reception ==
Professional ratings
Review scores
Source	Rating
NME	5/5 stars

Gladys Yeo of NME gave the album 5 out of 5 stars, writing that although some remain skeptical of their concept, the rising girl group have still yet to miss with their music.

== Track listing ==
Muhan track listing
No.	Title	Lyrics	Music	Arrangement	Length
1.	"Muhan"		Badd	Badd	1:01
2.	"Girls' Capitalism"	Jeon Jieun; Jaden Jeong	El Capitxn; Vendors (Louis); Nano (Vendors); Maria Marcus; Jonna Hall; Kim Jong Soo	El Capitxn; Vendors (Louis); Nano (Vendors)	3:38
3.	"Complexity" (Korean: 복합성; RR: boghabseong; lit. Complexity)	Jaden Jeong; G-High	Badd; San (Vendors); Maria Marcus; Mlc	Badd	2:38
4.	"Black Soul Dress"	Park SoHyun; Fuxxy; Any Masingga; Jaden Jeong	Park SoHyun; Fuxxy; Any Masingga; Alina Smith; Elli Moore; Ciara Muscat; Kwon Ae Jin	Park SoHyun; Fuxxy; Any Masingga	3:36
5.	"Seoul Sonyo Sound"	Jaden Jeong	Hymax; view	Hymax	2:30
6.	"Cry Baby"	Yi Yi Jin; Jaden Jeong	Noh Joo Hwan; SSo; Sofia Vivere	Badd; Fuxxy	2:37
7.	"Speed Love"	Artronic Waves; Safira.K	Artronic Waves	Artronic Waves	2:28
8.	"Number 8" (sung by Yoon Seo-yeon and Kaede)		Badd	Badd	1:15
Total length:					19:45

=== Notes ===
- "Muhan" is stylized as "ↀ"

== Charts ==
Weekly chart performance for Access
Chart (2023)	Peak position
South Korean Albums (Circle)	14

== Release history ==
Release history and formats for Access
Region	Date	Format	Label
South Korea	August 17, 2023	CD; digital download; streaming	ModHaus; Kakao Entertainment
Various	August 17, 2023	Digital download; streaming	ModHaus; Kakao Entertainment
