= Monster (Gabbie Hanna song) =

2018 songs by Gabbie Hanna

"Monster/Monster (Reborn)"
- "Monster" cover

Single by Gabbie Hanna
- Released: October 26, 2018
- Length: 2:49 ("Monster"); 1:16 ("Monster (Reborn)")
- Label: Self-published
- Songwriter(s): Gabbie Hanna; Some Randoms
- Producer(s): Some Randoms

Gabbie Hanna singles chronology
"Honestly/Honestly (Encore)" (2018)	"Monster/Monster (Reborn)" (2018)	"Medicate" (2019)

Audio sample
- "Monster": file; help

Music video
- "Monster / Monster (Reborn)" on YouTube

Alternative cover
- "Monster (Reborn)" cover

"Monster" is a song recorded by American Internet personality and singer Gabbie Hanna. It was independently released for digital download on October 26, 2018, simultaneously with its encore titled "Monster (Reborn)". Both tracks were written by Hanna and Some Randoms, while production was solely handled by the latter. The lyrics of "Monster" explore the theme of losing friends and self-analysis, and the song prominently features Hanna belting.

A double music video for "Monster" and "Monster (Reborn)" was uploaded to the singer's YouTube channel on the same day as the single's digital release and was directed by Ryan Parma. The video features her chasing a little girl into a house located in the woods at night, eventually setting it on fire and dousing herself in gasoline, hinting at Hanna's suicide. Commercially, "Monster" experienced minor success in the United States, peaking at number 19 on the Billboard Pop Digital Songs chart. In December 2018, Hanna became the center of a viral internet meme due to an interview with Genius she conducted earlier that year. During her interview, she performed excerpts of "Monster" a cappella, prompting several users to create satirical videos where her vocals were replaced by various sounds. Hanna performed "Monster" and "Monster (Reborn)" at the First Inaugural Patreon Assembly on November 2, 2019.

== Background and composition ==
"Monster" was independently released for digital download in various countries on October 26, 2018, simultaneously with its encore titled "Monster (Reborn)". Both were written by Hanna and Some Randoms, while production was solely handled by the latter. "Monster" includes Hanna belting the line: "So what if I'm the monster" throughout. In a Carpool Karaoke video on YouTube with Ricky Dillon, Hanna revealed that she initially chose a considerably lower key for the song. Hanna uses the lyrics to explore the theme of losing friendships—which she blames herself for—and "self-analysis". She uses the imagery of a scared little girl with "a monster under [her] bed", and also mentions her multiple origins in the line "Really they don't know what I'm made of". Hanna further elaborated on the message of "Monster":

I feel like ever since I was a child, whether it's family or groups of friends or being bullied or relationships, it feels like it's a revolving door. At the time when I was writing this song, it didn't feel like that's a normal part of life, and thankfully since then, I've realized that is a part of life. Sometimes relationships just don't work out because they don't work out. It's not my fault, and it's not your fault, it's both of us together that just doesn't work.

== Internet meme ==
In early December 2018, Hanna became the center of a viral internet meme due to an interview with Genius for their Verified series she conducted in the November of that year. There, she belted the song's refrain a cappella with "voracity"; Hanna retrospectively explained: "Before I scream 'monster', they use the boom mic that was directly above me, and for the part where I yell, they use the audio from, I believe, the camera. So it sounded not meshed". This caused several users to create short satirical clips in which the singer's vocals were replaced by "high-pitched squeal[s]" or the "vintage Windows launch sound effect", among others. Hanna "fully embraced the craze", changing her Twitter display name to "monsTEeeEeRRRRR" and uploading a video on her YouTube as an "official response". She has since released merchandise—including shirts and pop-sockets—displaying her face while singing, which was met with mixed reactions.

== Music video ==
An accompanying double music video for "Monster" and "Monster (Reborn)" was uploaded to Hanna's YouTube channel on October 26, 2018, which was directed and edited by Ryan Parma. The clip's first part begins with Hanna in the woods, lying on the ground in front of a house at night. Subsequently, she takes matches out of her jacket's pocket and strikes them as a little girl runs by. However, as the two make eye contact, she runs away and Hanna chases the girl as she enters the aforementioned house. The singer explores the house and peruses objects in the rooms, including pictures and a teddy bear. She finally finds the seemingly scared child in a bed and leans down to stroke her face.

Hanna subsequently steps back, revealing a bloody wound on her chest which permeated through her white shirt, and the camera cuts back to the girl, who has now transformed into a monster. Hanna runs away and spreads gasoline around the house to set it on fire. Interspersed shots show her in a room, singing to the lyrics, as well as either destroying or lighting up objects in the house. During the video's second part, Hanna sits alone in a burned shell of the house. Crying, she douses herself in gasoline and strikes a match. The video subsequently cuts to black as a woosh sound is heard, hinting at her suicide. In April 2021, Hanna accused American singer Bebe Rexha's music video for "Sabotage" (2021) of plagiarism, showing side-by-side frames of the latter and her "Monster" clip via her Twitter account. Rexha responded, however citing Eminem and Rihanna's "Love the Way You Lie" (2010) as an inspiration rather than "Monster".

== Track listing ==
- "Monster"
1. "Monster" – 2:49
- "Monster (Reborn)"
1. "Monster (Reborn)" – 1:16

== Charts ==
Chart (2018)	Peak position
US Pop Digital Songs (Billboard) "Monster"	19

== Release history ==
Country	Date	Format(s)	Label	Version	Ref.
Various	October 26, 2018	Digital download	Independent	"Monster"	
Various	October 26, 2018	Digital download	Independent	"Monster (Reborn)"	
