= Blackswan =

South Korean girl group

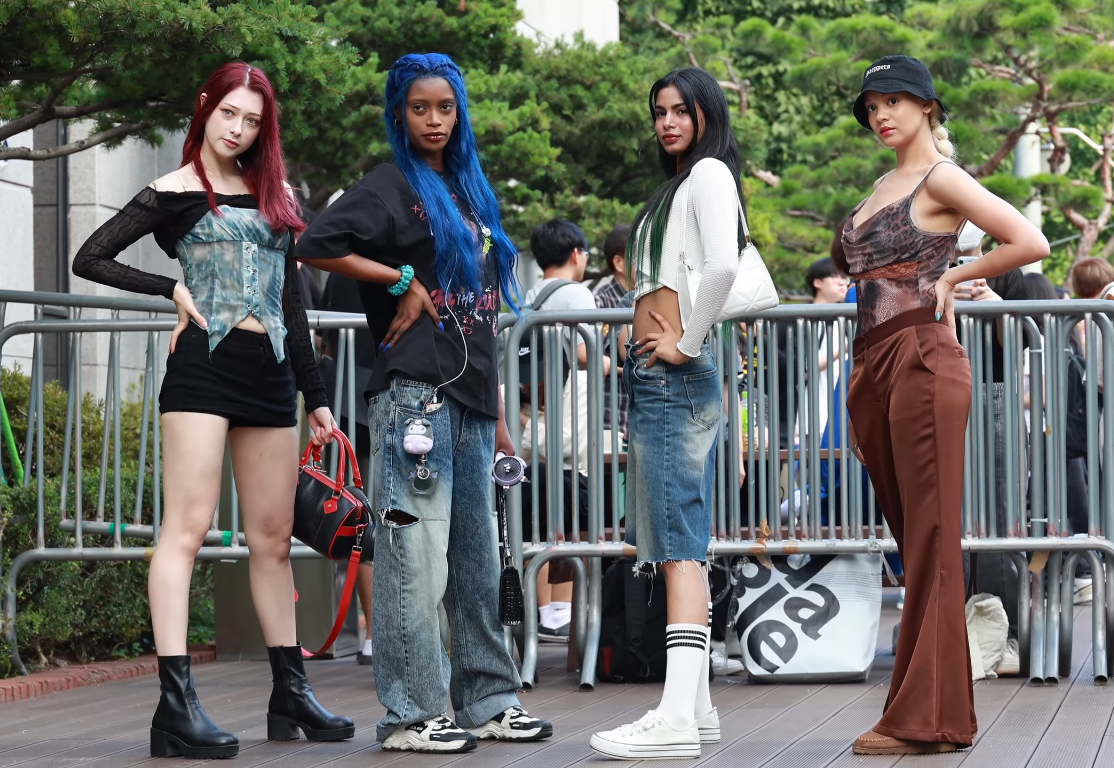
- Blackswan in 2024; From left to right: Gabi, Fatou, Sriya and NVee

Background information
- Origin: Seoul, South Korea
- Genres: K-pop; synth-pop; dancehall
- Years active: 2011–present
- Label: DR
- Members: Fatou; Gabi; Sriya; NVee
- Past members: see Former members

Blackswan (Korean: 블랙스완; stylized in all caps) is a South Korean multinational girl group formed by DR Music. The group consists of Fatou, Gabi, Sriya and NVee, and is the final lineup of Blackswan, as confirmed by Fatou herself in a Veeper audio.

They originally debuted under the name Rania (라니아) in 2011 with the EP Teddy Riley, the First Expansion In Asia. In December 2016, the group rebranded as BP Rania (Korean: BP 라니아; an acronym of Black Pearl Rania) and released two EPs, Start a Fire and Refresh 7th. The group returned to promoting as Rania in 2018 prior to rebranding as Blackswan in October 2020 with the album Goodbye Rania.

== Career ==
=== Pre-debut and member changes ===
The group was originally set to debut in mid-2010, as the third generation of Baby V.O.X. However, their record company DR Music; decided to rebrand them as a new group named Rania (short for "Regeneration Idol of Asia") with eight members: Saem (later known as Yina), Lucy (later known as Jooyi), Sarah, Riko, Joy, Di, T-ae, and Xia. T-ae, Riko, and Yina were chosen to star alongside former 2PM member Jay Park in his movie Hype Nation, which caused DR Music to delay the group's debut. At the beginning of 2011, Sarah decided to leave the group. While the company attempted to debut another member named Yijo, an interview with member Yina in 2022 revealed that the label ultimately did not find her fit for debut, though she still appeared in a few scenes from their debut music video.

=== 2011–2012: Debut as Rania and member changes ===
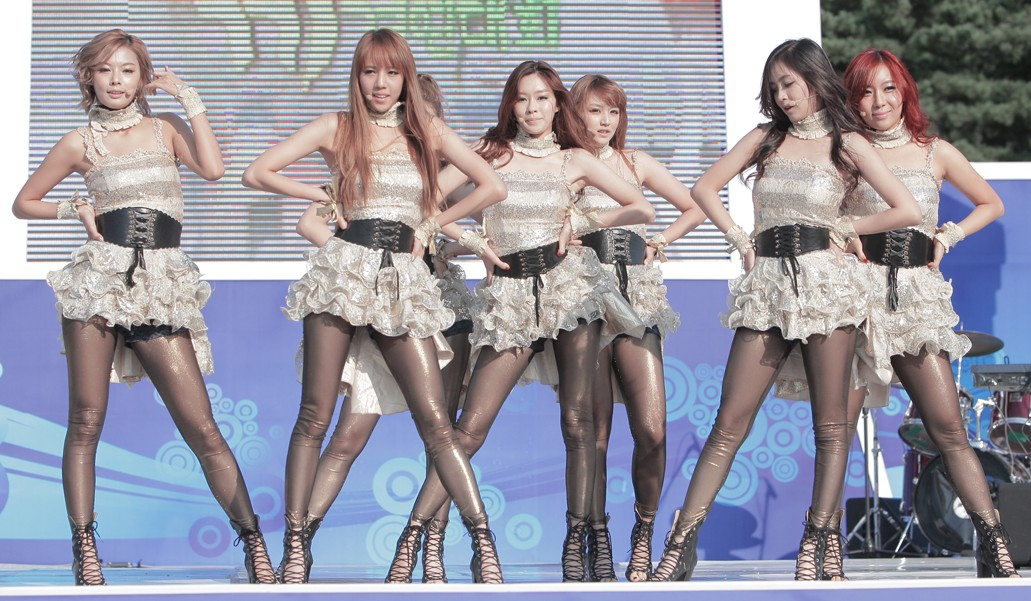
Rania on stage at the Multicultural Festival in Gyeonggi-do, in September 2011. From left to right: Di, Riko, Xia (behind), Yina, T-ae, Joy and Jooyi

Rania made their debut in April 2011 as a seven-member group consisting of Saem, Jooyi, Riko, Joy, Di, T-ae and Xia. On April 6, Rania performed on KBS' Music Bank, with the EP Teddy Riley, the First Expansion In Asia and its title track "Dr Feel Good", composed by Teddy Riley. The song was originally given to Lady Gaga. The music video and live performances were controversial in South Korea as some viewers felt that the group's image was too provocative. As a result, Rania was forced to change its choreography and make minor changes to the outfits. After the promotion of "Dr Feel Good", the group returned in June with its first digital single "Masquerade", also composed by Riley. Despite having planned an American debut, the group made no advancements. Shortly afterwards Riley announced that he would have nothing more to do with the group after falling out with their record label, releasing a statement saying:

I wish them the best. It's not the girls I dislike, I love Rania, they would be better with me at SM Entertainment. Their manager does shady business, used me for my music. I love Rania, I just don't like their company business. That's why they are not getting bigger. They don't do business upfront. They used my name every where then back door me on the group. It's ok if they will regret it. If they leave that company, I will sign them up quickly. Please know the facts before attacking me. Attack their company. Such great talent will be wasted if they don't get better support.

The group released their second EP, Time to Rock da Show, on November 16, 2011. The music video for its title track, "Pop Pop Pop", written by Brave Brothers, was revealed four days later. On May 30, 2012, Rania performed a new song named "Killer" at the Dream Concert.

In June 2012, Joy announced that she left the group, but DR Music claimed she was on hiatus because her parents' house in Thailand had been affected in the flood that occurred around the time of the release. Joy deleted her official Rania Twitter account soon after, but not before writing a post saying:

To everyone, I'm sorry I let you guys down so many times, but I've been thinking about it for months. I think I can't go back to stand on that place anymore. I can't go back anymore. Thanks for all of your love and all of your hope, thank you so much and I feel so sorry that I [am disappointing beloved fans]...From now...I think I can't be in the Entertainment [industry] or back to be a singer anymore since I was sick...But I haven't got any confidence to go back to do it. I'm sorry that I made you all have to wait for me...and I made you all feel confused. Thank you so much for gifts, kindness, love that you give me. Thank you.

Rania then made a comeback on September 16 with the second digital single "Style", whose music video was revealed on September 20. Jooyi did not appear in the comeback, though DR Music claimed she was still a member of the group.

=== 2013–2014: Just Go, temporary hiatus, and member changes ===
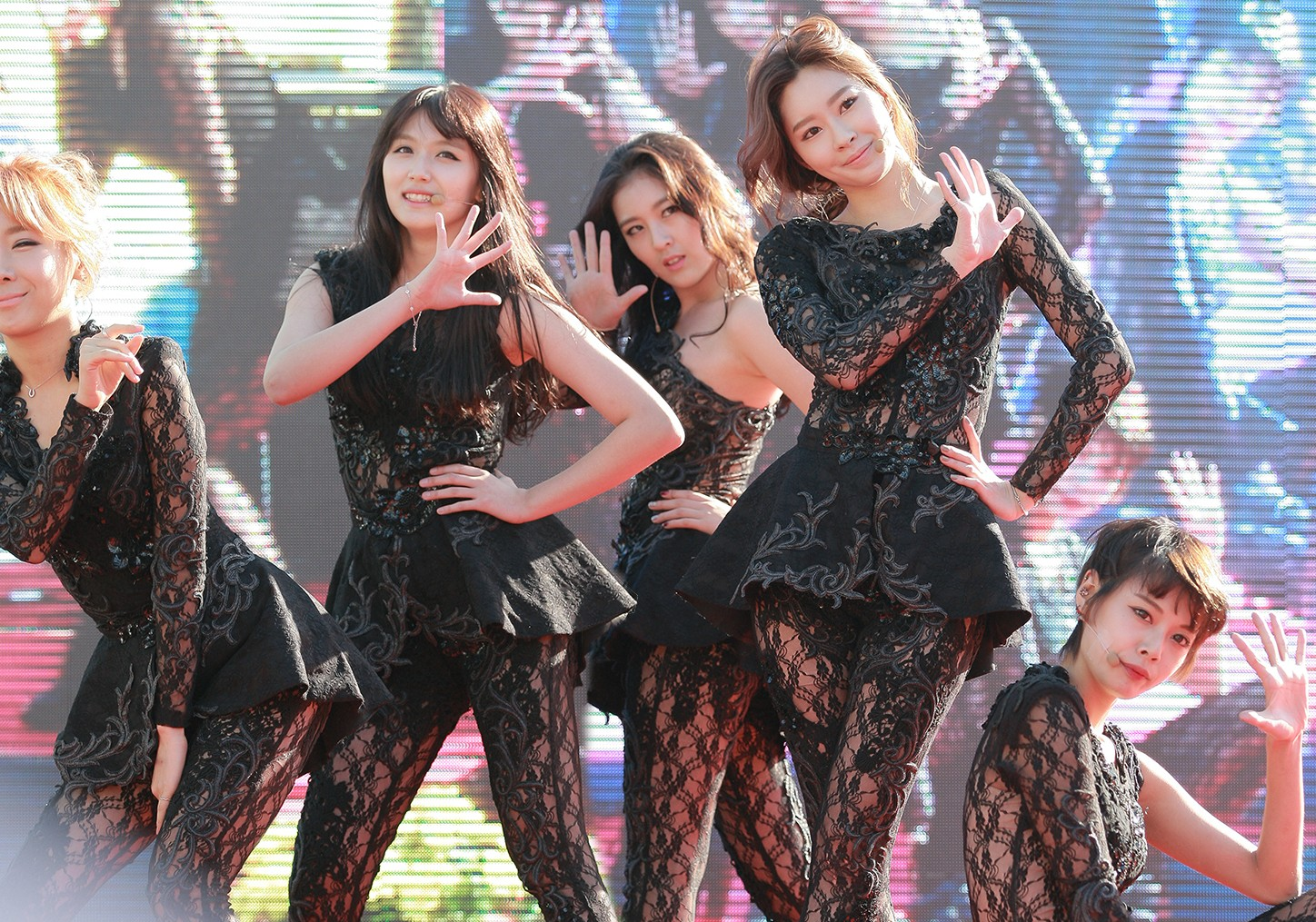
Rania performing at the Hyosung Angel Village Festival, on October 4, 2013.

Rania released the lead single "Just Go" on March 8, 2013, along with their first studio album, also titled Just Go (Goodbye's the New Hello). Riko did not participate in this release. They also announced they would debut in America in summer 2013. Empire Records was to handle the girls' distribution while Fireworks was to handle their American management. Larry Rudolph and Adam Leber, two of Britney Spears' managers, were expected to be Rania's managers throughout their U.S. promotions. Starting May 21, Rania began filming for their MTV reality show Road to Fame in Los Angeles and other cities across the U.S. The show would feature the group's preparations for their U.S. debut and would air for three months. It was also revealed that the album would feature collaborations with both Snoop Dogg and 2 Chainz. However, Rania's American debut was delayed again in June. In the meantime, the group filmed a commercial film for Woongjin Waterpark Play°C and released a special digital single titled "Up" for fans on July 5; Riko was absent again.

In May 2014, the group signed with Spanish label INGENIOmedia and confirmed they would have a comeback in July with "Acceleration", with a second round of promotions in September, but the material was never finalized, The label also confirmed that they were looking for a new and sixth member to replace Riko, who had been not participating from the group since "Just Go". Following an incident where a staffer at INGENIOmedia leaked Rania's comeback track to a sasaeng fan, the company severed ties with the group, stating they were "taking too long". INGENIOMedia later released a statement saying that they were not looking for a member to replace Riko, apologizing for any confusion, and said that any news on member changes would have to come from Rania's company.

In late 2014, the agency released a statement on Saem's possible departure; fans noticed that she had not participated in all the activities and touring, and deactivated all of her social media accounts as well, which sparked the rumors that she left the group. The agency denied the statement, then on the same day it announced Riko's departure to focus on her university studies:

After completing their promotions for their single "Style", Riko told us that she could attend university and to study the career and once she can finish all of her activities and subjects and once she graduated college she could return as a member of Rania, but the problem is back in the year she reapporach the subjects and ask more a year of absence and that's unfair to her because she could not postpone her absence anymore, she decided to quit as a singer and leave the agency indefiently.

=== 2015–2016: Return with Demonstrate, member changes, and reformation as BP Rania ===
In January 2015, fans noticed that Jooyi had not made any public appearances with the group, to which DR Music replied that she was on hiatus.

In July of that year, the group made an appearance with two new members, Seulji and Hyeme. In October, they were announced to be making a comeback as a six-member group on November 6 with their third EP Demonstrate. On November 3, Seulji and Hyeme were officially revealed as new members and it was announced that Demonstrate would feature African-American rapper Alexandra Reid, who is the first black woman to be an official member of a South Korean girl group. On November 4, DR Music confirmed that Reid would be joining the group, and confirmed Saem and Jooyi's departures.

DR Music sent out a letter to fans announcing their Makestar project, informing them that Rania's comeback had been pushed back to August 2016 and that they were working on a Hyeme and Alex sub-unit instead. However, on July 13, 2016, Makestar announced that due to repeated failed attempts to contact DR Music about the project's progress and "the continued irresponsible behavior and stance taken by the Rania project creator, and [their] unwillingness to ignore the inconvenience this [was] causing to the project participants", the project was terminated and all money returned to the fans.

On May 26, it was revealed that the last three original members of the group (Di, T-ae and Xia) chose not to renew their contracts and left the group for a new label, Enter Hama. They announced their plans to redebut as "Ela8te", though these plans fell through when disbanded.

On June 26, Rania performed at a Chinese event with three new DR Music trainees: Jian, Jieun (a former member of LPG), and Crystal. On August 15, 2016, Alex announced that she was the group's new leader. On October 25, they performed with two DR Music trainees (Ttabo and Hyeonji) at the 2016 Seoul ICARUS Drone International Film Festival. Two days later, DR Music stated that they would choose new Rania members out of the seven DR Music trainees. On December 23, 2016, DR Music revealed a teaser image for "BP Rania" ("Black Pearl" Rania, in reference to Alex's darker skin tone) and hinted a comeback as a seven-member group. On December 24, an image teaser for Hyeme and new member Jieun were revealed. On 25 December, Zi.U (formerly known as Seulji) and new member Yumin's teaser images were revealed. On December 26, DR Music revealed teaser images for Alex and new Chinese member Ttabo. It was reported that former member Saem rejoined the group two years after her departure in late 2014, and changed her stage name to Yina. On December 27, DR Music revealed the last teaser image for Saem, confirming that she had re-joined the group. The single "Start a Fire" was released on December 30, 2016, along with their fourth EP of the same name. DR Music said "Through Spanish company INGENIOmedia, the song will be available in more than 60 countries around the world."

=== 2017: Refresh 7th and member changes ===
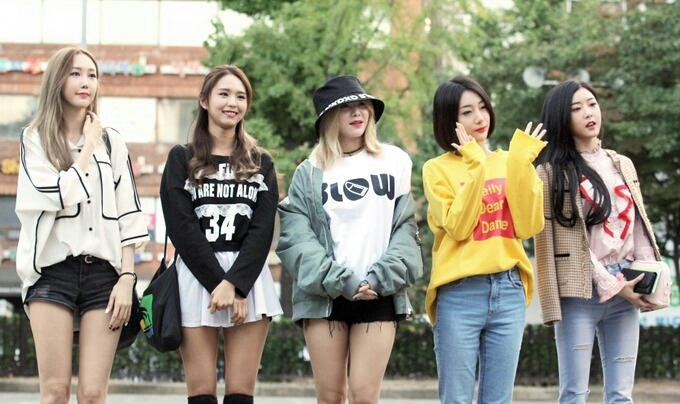
BP Rania on September 15, 2017.

On February 10, 2017, DR Music announced that BP Rania would start promotions for their second song "Make Me Ah" from the Start a Fire EP, on February 14. It was also announced that this would be the first time that Alex would take part in the entire choreography.

On February 21, DR Music revealed that they were approached by a "well established production company" with an acting opportunity for Alex, to which they responded by releasing a statement saying that they hoped that fans could understand the benefits of this opportunity, and that the opportunity would "allow the group to gain exposure and help BP Rania's success by expanding their fan base." DR Music assured the fans that Alex would remain a fully active member of BP Rania, and would return to her regular schedules after she returned to Korea. Around the same time INGENIOMedia announced that on February 28, they were opening preorders for BP Rania's first compilation album Rania Legends, comprising songs from "Dr Feel Good" to "Start a Fire", with the requirement that 100 preorders be made before they began manufacturing the albums. As well, they stated that all money raised would be dedicated to the production of a mini documentary titled "20 Days With BP RaNia", with any leftover money invested in the production of BP RaNia's next release. The release was eventually cancelled and pre-orders refunded, but INGENIOmedia said that all songs would be re-recorded by BP RaNia and included as a bonus CD and DVD in their next release instead.

On May 12, DR Music announced that they were looking for three to four new members to start BP Rania W, a worldwide group that would promote alongside the current members of BP Rania. At the end of March, Yina revealed that she had left the group again, and the agency later confirmed her departure from the group to focus on acting.

BP Rania continued as a six-member group, releasing their fifth EP Refresh 7th on August 12, with title track "Beep Beep Beep". Promotions became controversial when fans and viewers noticed that Alex had few lines and spent the majority of the performance standing to the side while the remaining five members continued to dance and sing. When fans asked the company to clarify, the choreographer responded "[Alex] said she won't do it because she's a rapper", to which Alex replied via Twitter "If these lies keep magically surfacing, I'll go ahead and come out with the truth. Let it really hit the fan." DR Music then issued a statement saying "The rumors that Alexandra was not willing, able, or present at practice to participate in the full choreography are false. Her level of talent is surpassed only by her work ethic and dedication to the team. It is for those reasons that we gave her the position of leader."

Soon afterwards it was announced that Alex had left the group.

On September 13, it was announced that the group would be making a comeback with "Breathe Heavy" from their Refresh 7th EP.

=== 2018–2019: Forthcoming comeback as Rania, hiatus, and member changes ===
In January 2018, DR Music issued a statement stating Ttabo was filming a movie in China, after fans noticed that she had missed several appearances with the group. On May 31, DR Music announced Yumin's departure from the group due to her having "recently been faced with circumstances that make it increasingly hard for her to follow the extremely demanding team schedule". It was also announced that the group would make a comeback in June and release a "Best Of" album in August, but neither event occurred. Soon afterwards it was announced that Yumin and former Topp Dogg member P-Goon had married and were expecting a child; the pair has since divorced.

On June 28, it was announced that Rania would begin promotions in Malaysia for a new August album, alongside new member Namfon.

On November 7, when asked via SNS by fans if she was still a member, Ttabo stated that she was an "ex-celebrity". Shortly afterwards, fans noticed that every remaining member of the group had removed "Rania" from their social media accounts and that the company had unfollowed some of the members, leading to rumors that DR Music as a company had gone bankrupt and defunct and the group had unofficially disbanded.

On August 18, 2019, Rania announced via their official Instagram account that they would be performing in Romania from September 4–5 with three new members, although the names and faces of the three were not announced yet. Fans began speculating that this meant Zi.U and Jieun had left the group. On August 28, the group's official YouTube account uploaded a video promoting its Romanian performance as well as revealing the three new members as Seunghyun, Larissa, and ex-Stellar member Youngheun, as well as confirming the departures of Jieun, Zi.U and Ttabo.

=== 2020–2021: Re-debut as Blackswan, Goodbye Rania and Close to Me ===
Around January 2020, Namfon stopped appearing during Rania performances, with no official statement of her whereabouts. In an interview with YouTuber Evangaline Pang in 2021, Namfon revealed that she privately left the group as a result of visa issues left unresolved by the label, who ceased contact with her after she chose to remain in Thailand.

On June 26, 2020, Hyeme announced through DR Music's social media pages that the Rania members at that time (except Seunghyun) would rebrand as B.S (later Blackswan).

Leia joined the group on July 3, 2020. Four days later, the group was appointed as ambassadors of Pyeongchang-gun, alongside K-TIGERS ZERO, to promote the county. In the same time, two new members were revealed: Judy and Fatou.

During a Channel A news broadcast, Blackswan participated in a news story on how the COVID-19 pandemic was affecting the K-pop industry, and revealed that their debut had been postponed indefinitely. On October 9, 2020, Blackswan's social media pages announced that they'd be making their debut with the full album Goodbye Rania on October 16, 2020. The lead single was titled "Tonight".

On November 9, 2020, Hyeme was involved in a scandal in which it was revealed that she'd allegedly scammed a friend out of 50 million KRW (approximately US$44,800). On November 10, DR Music announced Hyeme would leave Blackswan due to the expiration of her five-year contract. They also announced that, due to the aforementioned controversy, Blackswan would be going on a brief hiatus.

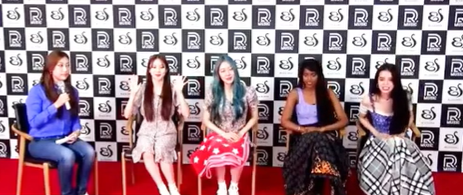
Blackswan in 2021

On March 6, 2021, Blackswan was revealed to have started a Korean Travel Series in collaboration with the Korean Cultural Center of Belgium.

On October 14, 2021, Blackswan released their first single album Close to Me.

=== 2022–2023: Members graduation, Cygnus project, That Karma and Leia's departure ===
On January 28, 2022, DR Music unveiled two trainees, Sriya Lenka from India, and Gabi Dalcin from Brazil, stating that only one of them would be joining Blackswan as the group's official fifth member. On May 26, DR Music introduced both Sriya and Gabi as new members of the group through the label's Cygnus project, a project with an admission and graduation concept.

On July 31, 2022, DR Music announced the graduation of Youngheun and Judy from Blackswan. On August 19, Fatou mentioned that the group was preparing to release new material during an interview with Teen Vogue.

On November 9, it was announced that Leia would be going on hiatus for health related reasons while the group would move forward with their next comeback.

On December 24, Blackswan released a Christmas pictorial video, where they revealed a new member named Alena Smith who will go by stagename NVee. She officially debuted with Blackswan at 2023 Men's FIH Hockey World Cup on January 11 in Odisha.

On May 10, 2023, it was announced that Blackswan would be releasing their 2nd single album, That Karma, on May 19, 2023. Indian Odia-language actor and producer Samaresh Routray helped the band to shoot the music video in Bhubaneswar.

On July 31, 2023, leader Fatou "confirmed on the Veeper app" that the current 4-member line-up is finalized, indicating member Leia had departed from the group since her hiatus in November 2022. No new members will be added.

On September 6, 2023, Blackswan released digitally a new version of That Karma titled That Karma - Pop Edition, which includes an English version track from their second single album and a new song "A World Without Pain". With the released of the new version, they resume their activities with promotions "Cat & Mouse".

=== 2024–present: Roll Up ===
On July 19, 2024, Blackswan announced that the group would release its sixth extended play (EP), Roll Up, on July 31, 2024. The music video of the lead single filmed in Dubai, was directed by Sagan Lee from Zanybros, who had previously worked with the group.

On July 25, it was revealed that Blackswan would be featuring in Apple TV documentary, K-pop Idols, which also marks the first appearance of member Leia since 2022. On May 21, 2025, they released "I Like It Hot", with the single album being the same name. They also were in the show KPopped, performing "Roll Up", "Motownphilly", and "End of the Road" with Boyz II Men.

== Members ==
=== Current members ===
- Fatou (파투) (2020–present) – leader, rapper, dancer
- NVee (앤비) (2022–present) – vocalist
- Gabi (가비) (2022–present) – vocalist, dancer
- Sriya (스리야) (2022–present) – vocalist, dancer

=== Former members ===
Rania and BP Rania

- Joy (조이) (2011–2012)
- Riko (리코) (2011–2014)
- Jooyi (주이) (2011–2015)
- Di (디) (2011–2016)
- T-ae (티애) (2011–2016)
- Xia (시아) (2011–2016)
- Yina (이나), previously known as Saem (샘) (2011–2015, 2016–2017)
- Alex (알렉산드라) (2015–2017)
- Yumin (유민) (2016–2018)
- Ttabo (따보) (2016–2018)
- Zi.U (지유), previously known as Seulji (슬지) (2015–2019)
- Jieun (지은) (2015–2019)
- Namfon (남폰) (2018–2020)
- Seunghyun (승현) (2019–2020)
- Hyeme (혜미) (2015–2020)
- Youngheun (영흔) (2019–2020)
- Larissa (라리사) (2019–2020)

Blackswan

- Hyeme (혜미) (2020)
- Youngheun (영흔) (2020–2022)
- Judy (주디) (2020–2022)
- Leia (2020–2023)

== Discography ==
=== Studio albums ===
Title	Album details	Peak chart positions	Sales
Title	Album details	KOR	Sales
Rania
Just Go (Goodbye's the New Hello)	Released: March 8, 2013; Label: DR Music, Yedang Company; Format: CD, digital download	9	KOR: 2,582
Blackswan
Goodbye Rania	Released: October 16, 2020; Label: DR Music, Danal Entertainment; Format: CD, digital download	71	KOR: 671+

=== Extended plays ===
List of extended plays, showing selected details, selected chart positions, and sales figures
Title	Details	Peak chart positions	Sales
Title	Details	KOR	Sales
Rania
Teddy Riley, the First Expansion In Asia	Released: April 6, 2011; Label: DR Music, Yedang Company; Format: Digital download	—	
Time to Rock da Show	Released: November 17, 2011; Label: DR Music, Yedang Company; Format: Digital download	—	
Demonstrate	Released: November 5, 2015; Label: DR Music, Danal Entertainment; Format: CD, digital download	—	
BP Rania
Start a Fire	Released: December 30, 2016; Label: DR Music, Danal Entertainment; Format: CD, digital download	—	
Refresh 7th	Released: August 12, 2017; Label: DR Music, Danal Entertainment; Format: Digital download; Track listing: 1. "Beep Beep Beep"; 2. "Breathe Heavy"; 3. "No Dab" (Hyemi & Alex duet); 4. "Breathe Heavy (English ver.)"	—	
Blackswan
Roll Up	Released: July 31, 2024; Label: DR Music, Danal Entertainment; Format: CD, digital download, streaming; Track list: 1. "C'est Jamais Vue"; 2. "Roll Up"; 3. "Double Down"; 4. "La Boum"; 5. "C'est Jamais Vue (instrumental)" 6. "Roll Up (instrumental)" 7. "Double Down (instrumental)" 8. "La Boum (instrumental)"	44	KOR: 1,432
"—" denotes a recording that did not chart or was not released in that territory

=== Single albums ===
Title	Details	Peak chart positions
Title	Details	KOR
Blackswan
Close to Me	Released: October 14, 2021; Label: DR Music, Danal Entertainment; Format : CD, digital download; Track list: 1. "Close to Me"; 2. "Close to Me" (English ver.); 3. "Get Up" (SHARK Remix)	93
That Karma	Released: May 19, 2023; Label: DR Music, Danal Entertainment; Format : CD, digital download; Track list: 1. "Karma"; 2. "Cat & Mouse"; 3. "Karma" (Instrumental); 4. "Cat & Mouse" (Instrumental)	–
That Karma - Pop Edition	Released: September 6, 2023; Label: DR Music, Danal Entertainment; Format: Digital download; Track list: 1. "Karma" (English Version); 2. "Cat & Mouse" (English Version); 3. "A World Without Pain"	–
I Like It Hot	Released: May 21, 2025; Label: DR Music, Danal Entertainment; Format : CD, digital download; Track list: 1. "I Like It Hot"; 2. "Roll Up" (Remix); 3. "I Like It Hot" (Instrumental); 4. "Roll Up" (Remix Instrumental)	–
"—" denotes a recording that did not chart or was not released in that territory

=== Singles ===
Title	Year	Peak chart positions		Sales	Album
Title	Year	KOR	KOR Hot	Sales	Album
Rania
"Dr. Feel Good" (닥터 필 굿)	2011	99	—	KOR: 119,828	Teddy Riley, the First Expansion In Asia
"Masquerade" (가면무도회)	2011	192	—		Teddy Riley, the First Expansion In Asia
"Pop Pop Pop"	2011	66	—	KOR: 223,084	Time to Rock da Show
"Style"	2012	40	47	KOR: 267,400	Just Go (Goodbye's the New Hello)
"Just Go"	2013	26	34	KOR: 118,728	Just Go (Goodbye's the New Hello)
"Up"	2013	—	—		Demonstrate
"Demonstrate"	2015	—	—		Demonstrate
BP Rania
"Start a Fire"	2016	—	—		Start a Fire
"Make Me Ah"	2017	—	—		Start a Fire
"Beep Beep Beep"	2017	—	—		Refresh 7th
"Breathe Heavy"	2017	—	—		Refresh 7th
Blackswan
"Tonight"	2020	—	—	—N/a	Goodbye Rania
"Close to Me"	2021	—	—	—N/a	Close to Me
"Karma"	2023	—	—	—N/a	That Karma
"Cat & Mouse"	2023	—	—	—N/a	That Karma
"Roll Up"	2024	—	—	—N/a	Roll Up
"I Like It Hot"	2025	— (Note: "I Like It Hot" did not enter the Circle Digital Chart but peaked at number 199 on the component Download Chart.)	—	—N/a	I Like It Hot
"—" denotes a recording that did not chart or was not released in that territory

== Videography ==
=== Music videos ===
Year	Title
RANIA
2011	"Dr. Feel Good"
2011	"Dr. Feel Good" (Uncut English version)
2011	"Pop Pop Pop"
2012	"Style"
2013	"Just Go"
2013	"Up"
2015	"Demonstrate"
2015	"Demonstrate" (Modified version with Alex)
BP RANIA
2016	"Start a Fire"
2017	"Beep Beep Beep" (Dance version)
2017	"Breathe Heavy" (Special performance video)
2017	"Breathe Heavy" (Dance version)
BLACKSWAN
2020	"Tonight"
2020	"Tonight" (Performance video)
2021	"Close to Me"
2021	"Close to Me" (Performance video)
2022	"Get Up" (Shark Remix)
2023	"Karma"
2023	"Karma" (Performance video)
2023	"Cat & Mouse"
2024	"Roll Up"
2025	"I Like It Hot"

== Tours, Fanmeetings & Festivals ==
RANIA The First Asian Fan Tour
Date	City	Country	Venue
July 16, 2011	Bangkok	Thailand	Novotel Bangkok
August 20, 2011	Manilla	The Philippines	Star Theater
September 18, 2011	Singapore		Club Butterfly

RANIA & YOU Promo Tour Party in Malaysia 2018
Date	City	Country	Venue
June 30, 2018	George Town	Malaysia	Gurney Paragon Mall
June 30, 2018	Bukit Mertajam	Malaysia	AEON Mall Bukit Mertajam
July 1, 2018	Kuala Lumpur	Malaysia	HELP University
July 1, 2018	Kuala Lumpur	Malaysia	KL Gateway Mall

BLACKSWAN Live Performance & Fan Meeting
Date	City	Country	Venue	Notes
November 4, 2023	Guangzhou	China	Kugou Music APP	Online Fanmeeting
November 9, 2023	Buena Park	United States	The Source OC	
November 10, 2023	Ontario	United States	KPOP 1004	
November 11, 2023	Fresno	United States	Fresno KPOP Nation	
November 12, 2023	Rancho Cordova	United States	Sacramento KPOP Nation	
November 12, 2023	Rancho Cordova	United States	KP Plaza	
November 14, 2023	Los Angeles	United States	KPOP Bestie	

BLACKSWAN Japan Fanmeeting 2024 In Tokyo
Date	City	Country	Venue	Notes
Cancelled shows
June 1, 2024	Tokyo	Japan	Veats Shibuya	Cancelled due to comeback scheduling conflict.

BLACKSWAN US FAN CONCERT 2025 TOUR - Lumina’s Light
Date	City	Country	Venue
June 1, 2025	Chicago	United States	Harold Washington Cultural Center
June 4, 2025	Dallas	United States	The Texas Theatre
June 6, 2025	Atlanta	United States	Variety Playhouse
June 8, 2025	Los Angeles	United States	The Belasco

Waterbomb Festival
Date	City	Country	Venue
June 23, 2023	Seoul	South-Korea	Jamsil Sports Complex
June 6, 2024	Dubai	United Arab Emirates	Dubai Festival City
April 12, 2025	Haikou	China	Changying Park

== Awards and nominations ==
=== Honors ===
Name of organization, year given, and the name of the honor
Organization	Year	Honor	Ref.
Newsis K-EXPO Cultural Awards (Note: Established in 2019 and co-sponsored by Korea's Ministry of Culture, Sports and Tourism, Ministry of Foreign Affairs, Korea Creative Content Agency, Seoul Metropolitan Council and the Seoul Tourism Organization, it awards cultural icons, businesses, and individuals who have contributed greatly to Hallyu, the Korean wave.)	2023	Next Generation Hallyu Star Award	
