= Out Loud (Naio Ssaion album) =

Studio album by Naio ssaion
- Released: 25 November 2005
- Genre: Nu metal, Alternative metal

Out Loud is the second studio album of Slovenian rock band Naio Ssaion. It was released on 25 November 2005 by Napalm Records.

== Track listing ==
1. Static
2. The Mirror
3. Teen
4. Miss You
5. Bow Link In E Minor
6. n.ss
7. Shut Up
8. Blah-Blah
9. Blind Date
10. Can't You Hear
11. At Ease
12. Yours Faithfully
13. Out Of the Great Book of Fairytales
