= Alexandra Reid =

American singer

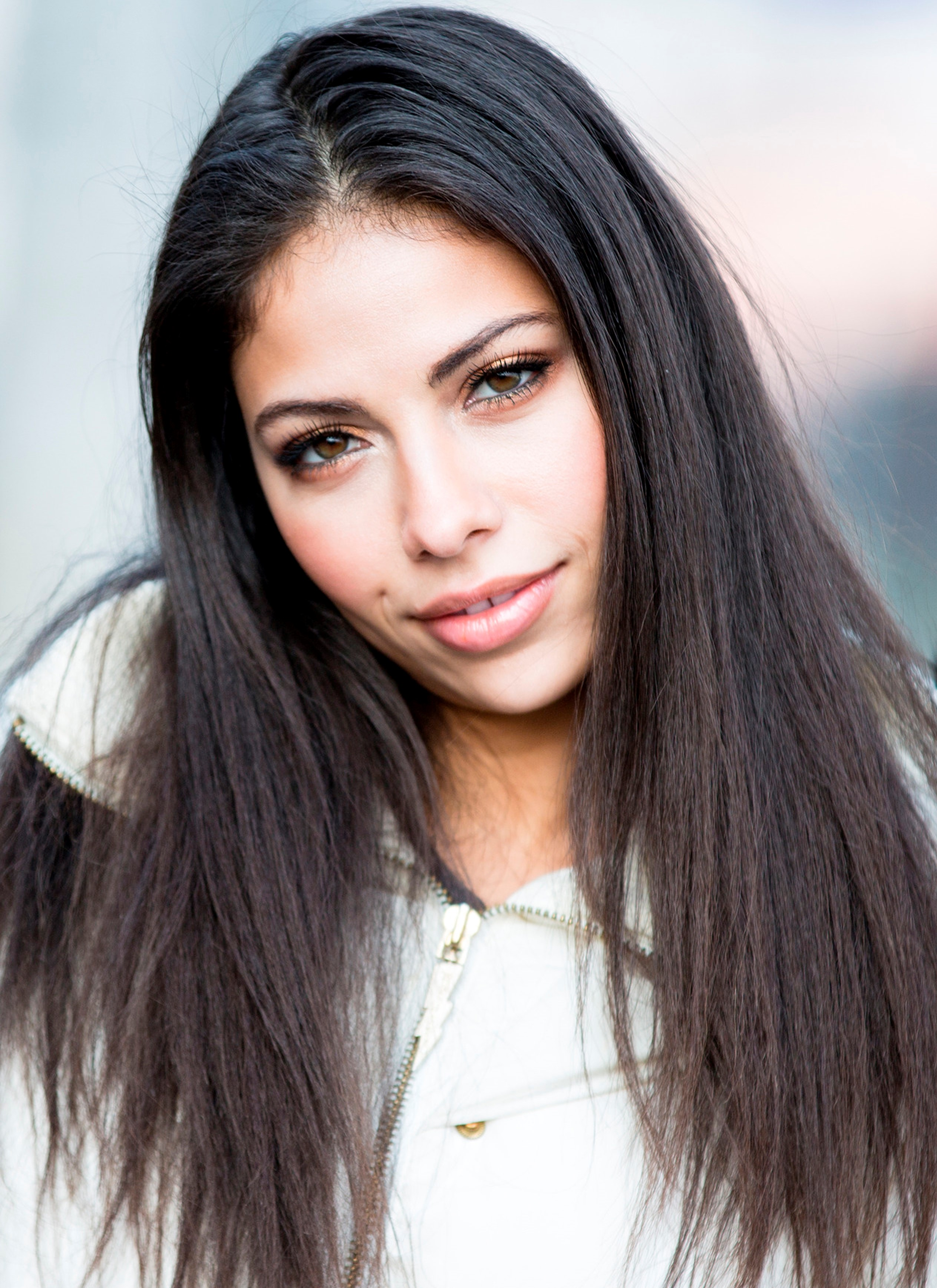
- Reid in January 2017
- Born: Alexandra Reid Varley; March 5, 1989 (age 37); Kansas City, Kansas, U.S.
- Occupations: Singer; songwriter; rapper; model; actress
- Years active: 2004–present
- Musical career
- Genres: Pop; K-pop; hip-hop; R&B
- Instrument: Vocals
- Years active: 2011–present
- Labels: DR Music; Def Jam
- Formerly of: BP Rania

Alexandra Reid Varley (born March 5, 1989), known professionally as Alex Reid or simply Alex, is an American singer and rapper. She is a former member of the South Korean girl group BP Rania, becoming the first African American K-Pop idol in the world.

== Early life ==
Alexandra Reid Varley was born in Kansas City, Kansas. Relocating to Plano, Texas, as a child, she began working as a model in the Dallas fashion scene. Reid is mixed and has Swedish, Sub-Saharan African and Hungarian heritage.

== Career ==
=== 2004–2014: Career beginnings and Letters to My Ex ===
Reid was introduced as one of the sixteen cast members of the third season of Discovery Kids' reality television children's program Endurance in 2004. She was partnered with Bjorn Leum and competed together as the Green Team, ultimately placing seventh overall in the competition. Shortly after, Reid's Myspace profile was discovered by L.A. Reid's assistant, thus prompting her to move to New York City and initiated preparation for her debut—ultimately signing a recording contract with Def Jam Recordings and a publishing contract with Sony Music. She then moved to Los Angeles, California, and was managed by Scooter Braun. Reid released her debut single, "Body to Body," on November 7, 2011, with an accompanying lyric video. The lyrics of the song were penned by herself, while the instrumental was produced by Dru Castro and Phil Margaziotis. The song was performed live for the first time in conjunction with a rendition of "Do It Like a Dude" by Jessie J at the Kwanzaa Fest 2011 event held in Dallas, Texas.

Reid released her debut extended play, Letters to My Ex, on August 31, 2012. Despite failing to chart, the extended play received positive reviews from online music blogs and forums. Letters to My Ex produced two singles prior to its initial release—the first single, "Soldier", was released on August 3, 2012. The song featured Traphik, who also contributed in the penmanship of the song. The second single, "My Ex", was released on August 10, 2012. During an interview with Chan Lo, reporting for the Chicks N Kicks online magazine, she revealed that production for her then-upcoming second extended play, Chik Muzik, has begun and deemed it a "'take it or leave it' type record; young, fresh, and bold—music that doesn't take itself too seriously." The extended play was planned to be released in March 2013, however it has remained unreleased since. Following a year-long hiatus, Reid released a stand-alone single, "Want Me Some U", on February 14, 2014.

=== 2015–17: Rania ===
DR Music announced a comeback for Rania with six composing members following numerous line-up changes prior to the announcement on October 29, 2015. Reid was subsequently revealed as the third and final newest addition to the group on November 4, 2015. Her membership received approval from Korean netizens, with many complimenting her appearance; on the other hand, the unveil resulted in a "heated debate between hardcore and casual fans of K-pop and hip-hop, points of contention between cultural appropriation, creative licenses, and proper representation." Rania's third extended play, Demonstrate, was released on November 4, 2015, however its title track's music video did not feature Reid and instead displayed numerous shots of the other members throughout her verses. The situation was addressed by South Korean media, citing visa issues. The music video was re-released on November 11, 2015, featuring numerous shots of Reid filtered in grayscale. The song was performed live for the first time with the complete line-up on the November 14, 2015, broadcast of MBC's music television program Show! Music Core.

In 2016, DR Music launched a fundraiser to fund the debut of the sub-unit Hex—composed of Reid and the youngest member Hyeme—as well as Rania's then-upcoming fourth extended play, which was planned for an August 2016 release. However, the fundraiser was terminated by Makestar following numerous failed attempts of communication between the two parties. The termination followed the departure of the three remaining original members of Rania—Di, T-ae, and Xia—which resulted in the postponement of their then-upcoming extended play. Reid was subsequently promoted to leader of the group. Following a brief stint in the United States to finalize the production of Rania's next album, she performed at the W Concert event held in Seoul, South Korea on November 20, 2016. DR Music announced that the group would be renamed BP Rania and ultimately released their fourth extended play, Start a Fire, on December 29, 2016. "Make Me Ah" served as the second promotional single from the extended play. DR Music announced Reid's absence from the remaining scheduled performances for the single on February 21, 2017, as a result of an acting opportunity. She portrayed Britt in TV One's biographical film Bobbi Kristina, which premiered on October 8, 2017. Following a series of events which included a feud with BP Rania's choreographer, DR Music announced Reid's departure from the group on August 19, 2017.

=== 2017–present: Standalone singles and upcoming memoir ===
On December 9, 2017, Reid announced the upcoming release of "East West", which was initially intended for the Hex sub-unit, although a time frame was not provided. The single was ultimately released on March 19, 2018. "Gretchen Wieners" was released as a follow-up single on June 24, 2018.

She is currently writing a memoir revolving around her experiences in the South Korean music industry.

== Filmography ==
=== Television ===
Title	Year	Role	Notes
Endurance: Hawaii	2004	Contestant	7th place
Bobbi Kristina	2017	Britt	Television film

=== Music videos ===
Title	Year	Artist	Director
"You Changed Me"	2015	Jamie Foxx ft. Chris Brown	Director X

== Discography ==
=== Extended plays ===
List of extended plays
Title	EP details
Letters to My Ex	Released: September 12, 2012; Label: Independent; Format: Digital download, online streaming; Track listing: 1. "My Ex"; 2. "Soldier" (featuring Traphik); 3. "Hallelujah" (featuring Ben J of New Boyz); 4. "Do It Like Me"; 5. "Good Girl"; 6. "Want Me Bad"

=== Singles ===
List of singles as lead artist, showing year released and album name
Title	Year	Album
"Body to Body"	2011	Non-album single
"Soldier" (featuring Traphik)	2012	Letters to My Ex
"My Ex"	2012	Letters to My Ex
"Want Me Some U"	2014	Non-album single
"Good Girl"	2014	Letters to My Ex
"Good Shh!"	2016	Non-album single
"East West"	2018	Non-album single
"Gretchen Wieners"	2018	Non-album single
