= Do It =

Do It may refer to:

== Music ==
- Do It Records, a British record label

=== Albums ===
- Do It (GJan album), 2017
- Do It ('Til You're Satisfied) (album), by B. T. Express, 1974
- Do It! (album), by Clinic, 2008
- Do It (EP), by Rollins Band, 1987
- Do It (Choi Young-jae album), 2023
- Do It (mixtape), by Stray Kids, 2025

=== Songs ===
- "Do It" (Chloe x Halle song), 2020
- "Do It" (Nelly Furtado song), 2007
- "Do It" (Rasheeda song), 2000
- "Do It" (Stray Kids song), 2025
- "Do It" (Toni Braxton song), 2020
- "Do It ('Til You're Satisfied)", by B. T. Express, 1974
- "Do It" (Underscores song), 2025
- "Do It!" (song), by Mai Kuraki, 2018
- "Dooo It!", by Miley Cyrus, 2015
- "Big Shit Poppin' (Do It)", by T.I., 2007
- "Do It", by ¥$ from Vultures 1, 2024
- "Do It", by the Beastie Boys from Ill Communication, 1994
- "Do It", by Chung Ha from Offset, 2017
- "Do It", by Ciara from Ciara: The Evolution, 2006
- "Do It", by Dead or Alive from Sophisticated Boom Boom, 1984
- "Do It", by The Cockroaches from Fingertips, 1988
- "Do It", by Dizzee Rascal from Boy in da Corner, 2003
- "Do It", by the Doors from Soft Parade, 1969
- "Do It!", by the Flaming Lips and Yoko Ono/Plastic Ono Band from The Flaming Lips and Heady Fwends, 2012
- "Do It", by iamnot, 2015
- "Do It", by Kaytranada from Bubba, 2019
- "Do It", by KC and the Sunshine Band from All in a Night's Work, 1982
- "Do It", by Keri Hilson from In a Perfect World..., 2009
- "Do It", by Neil Diamond, the B-side of "Solitary Man", 1966
- "Do It", by the Pink Fairies from Never Never Land, 1971
- "Do It", by Pussycat, the B-side of "Mississippi", 1975
- "Do It", by Rae Morris from Someone Out There, 2017
- "Do It", by Selena Gomez from For You, 2014
- "Do It", by the Spice Girls from Spiceworld, 1997
- "Do It", by Swoop from Thriller, 1993
- "Do It", by Tuxedo from Tuxedo, 2015
- "Do It", by XO-IQ, featured in the television series Make It Pop
- "Do It", by Yeonjun from No Labels: Part 01, 2025

== Other uses ==
- Do It (TV series), an Australian lifestyle program
- Do It!, a 1980s children's TV programme presented by Sheelagh Gilbey
- Do It!: Scenarios of the Revolution, a 1970 book by Jerry Rubin

== See also ==
- Doin' It (disambiguation)
- Doit (disambiguation)
