= List of awards and nominations received by Chung Ha =

Chung Ha awards and nominations
- Chung Ha in 2026
Awards and nominations
Award	Wins	Nominations
Asia Artist Awards	2	4
Brand Customer Loyalty Award	2	2
Brand of the Year Awards	1	1
Gaon Chart Music Awards	2	8
Genie Music Awards	2	5
Golden Disc Awards	2	9
Korea First Brand Awards	1	3
Korea Popular Music Awards	1	4
Korean Music Awards	1	1
Melon Music Awards	2	8
Mnet Asian Music Awards	4	15
Mubeat Awards	0	1
Seoul Music Awards	2	15
Soribada Best K-Music Awards	2	4
The Fact Music Awards	2	2

Totals (Note: Certain award groups do not simply award one winner. They acknowledge several different recipients, have runners-up, and have third place. Since this is a specific recognition and is different from losing an award, runner-up mentions are considered wins in this award tally. For simplification and to avoid errors, each award in this list has been presumed to have had a prior nomination.)
- Wins: 26
- Nominations: 82

Kim Chung-ha, better known by the mononym Chung Ha, is a South Korean singer. She finished fourth in Mnet's girl group survival show Produce 101 and was a member of the resulting girl group I.O.I. Chung Ha made her solo debut in June 2017 with extended play Hands on Me.

== Awards and nominations ==
Name of the award ceremony, year presented, category, nominee of the award, and the result of the nomination
Award ceremony	Year	Category	Nominee / work	Result	Ref.
Asia Artist Awards	2018	AAA Favorite Award	"Roller Coaster" & "Love U"	Won	
Asia Artist Awards	2019	Best Icon Award – Music	Chungha	Won	
Asia Artist Awards	2021	Female Solo Singer Popularity Award	Chungha	Nominated	
Asia Artist Awards	2026	Popularity Award – Solo (Female)	Chungha	Pending	
Brand Customer Loyalty Award	2020	Best Female Soloist	Chungha	Won	
Brand Customer Loyalty Award	2021	Best Female Solo Singer	Chungha	Won	
Brand of the Year Awards (Note: Brand of the Year Awards is an awards ceremony hosted by the Korean Consumer Brand Committee and overseen by the Korean Consumer Forum.)	2020	Female Solo Artist	Chungha	Won	
Gaon Chart Music Awards	2018	New Artist of the Year – Female Solo	"Why Don't You Know" (ft. Nucksal)	Nominated	
Gaon Chart Music Awards	2020	Artist of the Year – Digital Music (January 2019)	"Gotta Go"	Nominated	
Gaon Chart Music Awards	2020	Artist of the Year – Digital Music (June 2019)	"Snapping"	Nominated	
Gaon Chart Music Awards	2020	Hot Performance of the Year	Chungha	Won	
Gaon Chart Music Awards	2021	Artist of the Year – Digital Music (January 2020)	"Loveship" (with Paul Kim)	Nominated	
Gaon Chart Music Awards	2021	Artist of the Year – Digital Music (April 2020)	"Stay Tonight"	Nominated	
Gaon Chart Music Awards	2021	Artist of the Year – Digital Music (July 2020)	"Play"	Nominated	
Gaon Chart Music Awards	2021	Artist of the Year – Digital Music (September 2020)	"Bad Boy" (with Christopher)	Won	
Genie Music Awards	2018	Female Artist Award	Chungha	Won	
Genie Music Awards	2018	Artist of the Year	Chungha	Nominated	
Genie Music Awards	2018	Genie Music Popularity Award	Chungha	Nominated	
Genie Music Awards	2019	The Female Solo Artist	Chungha	Won	
Genie Music Awards	2019	Performing Artist (Female)	Chungha	Nominated	
Golden Disc Awards	2018	New Artist of the Year	Chungha	Nominated	
Golden Disc Awards	2018	Global Popularity Award	Chungha	Nominated	
Golden Disc Awards	2019	Popularity Award	Chungha	Nominated	
Golden Disc Awards	2019	NetEase Most Popular K-pop Star	Chungha	Nominated	
Golden Disc Awards	2019	Digital Daesang	"Roller Coaster"	Nominated	
Golden Disc Awards	2019	Digital Bonsang	"Roller Coaster"	Won	
Golden Disc Awards	2020	Popularity Award	Chungha	Nominated	
Golden Disc Awards	2020	Digital Daesang	"Gotta Go"	Nominated	
Golden Disc Awards	2020	Digital Bonsang	"Gotta Go"	Won	
Korea First Brand Awards	2017	Female Idol	Chungha	Won	
Korean Music Awards	2022	Best K-pop Album	Querencia	Won	
Korea Popular Music Awards (Note: The Korea Popular Music Awards were jointly established in 2018 by the Korea Singers Association, the Korea Entertainment Producer's Association, the Recording Industry Association of Korea, the Federation of Korean Music Performers, and the Korea Music Copyright Association.)	2018	Best Artist	Chungha	Nominated	
Korea Popular Music Awards	2018	Popularity Award	Chungha	Nominated	
Korea Popular Music Awards	2018	Best Digital Song	"Roller Coaster"	Nominated	
Korea Popular Music Awards	2018	Best Solo Dance Track	"Roller Coaster"	Won	
Melon Music Awards	2017	Best New Artist	Chungha	Nominated	
Melon Music Awards	2018	Song of the Year	"Roller Coaster"	Nominated	
Melon Music Awards	2018	Best Female Dance	"Roller Coaster"	Nominated	
Melon Music Awards	2018	Top 10 Artist	Chungha	Nominated	
Melon Music Awards	2019	Top 10 Artist	Chungha	Won	
Melon Music Awards	2019	Artist of the Year	Chungha	Nominated	
Melon Music Awards	2019	Song of the Year	"Gotta Go"	Nominated	
Melon Music Awards	2019	Best Female Dance	"Gotta Go"	Won	
Mnet Asian Music Awards	2017	Artist of the Year	Chungha	Nominated	
Mnet Asian Music Awards	2017	Best New Female Artist	Chungha	Nominated	
Mnet Asian Music Awards	2017	Best of Next	Chungha	Won	
Mnet Asian Music Awards	2018	Best Female Artist	Chungha	Nominated	
Mnet Asian Music Awards	2018	Best Dance Performance – Female Solo	"Roller Coaster"	Won	
Mnet Asian Music Awards	2019	Artist of the Year	Chungha	Nominated	
Mnet Asian Music Awards	2019	Best Female Artist	Chungha	Won	
Mnet Asian Music Awards	2019	Worldwide Fans' Choice Top 10	Chungha	Nominated	
Mnet Asian Music Awards	2019	2019 Qoo10 Favorite Female Artist	Chungha	Nominated	
Mnet Asian Music Awards	2019	Song of the Year	"Gotta Go"	Nominated	
Mnet Asian Music Awards	2019	Best Dance Performance – Female Solo	"Gotta Go"	Won	
Mnet Asian Music Awards	2020	Best Female Artist	Chungha	Nominated	
Mnet Asian Music Awards	2020	Artist of the Year	Chungha	Nominated	
Mnet Asian Music Awards	2020	Worldwide Fans' Choice Top 10	Chungha	Nominated	
Mnet Asian Music Awards	2021	Worldwide Fans' Choice Top 10	Chungha	Nominated	
Mubeat Awards	2019	Best Female Solo	Chungha	Nominated	
Seoul Music Awards	2018	New Artist Award	Chungha	Won	
Seoul Music Awards	2018	Popularity Award	Chungha	Nominated	
Seoul Music Awards	2018	Hallyu Special Award	Chungha	Nominated	
Seoul Music Awards	2019	Bonsang Award	Chungha	Nominated	
Seoul Music Awards	2019	Popularity Award	Chungha	Nominated	
Seoul Music Awards	2019	Hallyu Special Award	Chungha	Nominated	
Seoul Music Awards	2020	Bonsang Award	Chungha	Won	
Seoul Music Awards	2020	Daesang Award	Chungha	Nominated	
Seoul Music Awards	2020	Popularity Award	Chungha	Nominated	
Seoul Music Awards	2020	Hallyu Special Award	Chungha	Nominated	
Seoul Music Awards	2020	QQ Music Most Popular K-Pop Artist Award	Chungha	Nominated	
Seoul Music Awards	2020	Dance Performance Award	"Gotta Go"	Nominated	
Seoul Music Awards	2021	Bonsang Award	Chungha	Nominated	
Seoul Music Awards	2021	Popularity Award	Chungha	Nominated	
Seoul Music Awards	2021	K-wave Popularity Award	Chungha	Nominated	
Soribada Best K-Music Awards	2018	Music Star Award	Chungha	Won	
Soribada Best K-Music Awards	2018	Bonsang Award	Chungha	Nominated	
Soribada Best K-Music Awards	2019	Bonsang Award	Chungha	Won	
Soribada Best K-Music Awards	2019	Female Popularity Award	Chungha	Nominated	
The Fact Music Awards	2019	Artist of the Year (Bonsang)	Chungha	Won	
The Fact Music Awards	2020	Artist of the Year (Bonsang)	Chungha	Won	

== See also ==
- List of awards and nominations received by I.O.I
