= Lawless Lawyer =

2018 South Korean legal thriller television series

- Promotional poster
- Also known as: Lawless Attorney
- Hangul: 무법 변호사
- Hanja: 無法 辯護士
- RR: Mubeop byeonhosa
- MR: Mubŏp pyŏnhosa
- Genre: Legal; Thriller
- Created by: Studio Dragon
- Written by: Yoon Hyun-ho
- Directed by: Kim Jin-min
- Starring: Lee Joon-gi; Seo Yea-ji; Lee Hye-young; Choi Min-soo
- Country of origin: South Korea
- Original language: Korean
- No. of episodes: 16

Production
- Executive producers: Lee Jang-soo; Choi Tae-young
- Camera setup: Single-camera
- Running time: 60 minutes
- Production company: Logos Film

Original release
- Network: tvN
- Release: May 12 – July 1, 2018

Lawless Lawyer (Korean: 무법 변호사; RR: Mubeop byeonhosa) is a 2018 South Korean television series starring Lee Joon-gi, Seo Yea-ji, Lee Hye-young, and Choi Min-soo. The series was written by Yoon Hyun-ho and directed by Kim Jin-min. The series is set in the fictional city of Kisung which is described as lawless and corrupt.

The series follows characters Bong Sang-pil and Ha Jae-yi who form the Lawless Law Firm. Sang-pil, a former gangster turned lawyer, seeks to avenge his mother and fight against those with absolute power. He often resorts to using his fists and loopholes in the law to achieve his goals. Ha Jae-yi is a lawyer of high integrity who works with Sang-pil after she is suspended for assaulting a judge. Together they use the law to fight for justice against corrupt judge Cha Moon-sook and her associates.

Lawless Lawyer premiered on tvN on May 12, 2018. It concluded on July 1, 2018 with the airing of the 16th episode. The series was a commercial hit and became one of the highest-rated Korean dramas in cable television history.

== Plot ==
=== Background ===
18 years prior to the events of the series, Cha Moon-sook murders a man critical of her late father. She then orders gangster Ahn Oh-joo to cover it up. Lawyer Cho Jin-ae discovers the truth of the event due to pictures taken by Noh Hyung-joo. Oh-joo murders Jin-ae, but her young son Sang-pil escapes with the help of Hyung-joo. Sang-pil flees to his uncle Choi Dae-woong, who is a gangster in Seoul. Hyung-joo is forced to leave her husband and young daughter, Ha Jae-yi, behind to flee the country. Moon-sook becomes a prominent judge and is seen as a pillar of the community. Oh-joo becomes the boss of large corporation and gains wealth. Sang-pil and Jae-yi both become lawyers in the city of Seoul.

=== Synopsis ===
An adult Sang-pil leaves his lucrative practice in Seoul and returns to Kisung to bring those responsible for his mother's death to justice. He takes over a loan shark business and converts it into the Lawless Law Firm. Jae-yi, who has been suspended from practicing law after assaulting a judge, loses her job, and also returns home to Kisung. She soon ends up working for Sang-pil, and later becomes his partner when reinstated as a lawyer. After learning the truth about Moon-sook, she joins Sang-pil in his pursuit of justice for the wrong done to their mothers. Together, they use the law to fight against Moon-sook and her associates. Over time, they fall in love.

Moon-sook and Oh-joo grow in influence and power through corrupt methods; Oh-joo becomes the mayor of Kisung and Moon-sook is nominated for chief justice in the Supreme Court. They and their associates oppose the Lawless Law Firm both inside and outside the courtroom by using underhanded tactics, including murdering Dae-woong and framing Sang-pil for it, bribing or threatening witnesses and assaulting Jae-yi. Despite the obstacles in their way, Sang-pil and Jae-yi succeed in revealing Moon-sook's crimes in court and successfully plead their case against her. Moon-sook and her associates end up in prison, whereas Oh-joo commits suicide. Jae-yi and Sang-pil then return to Seoul to help Prosecutor Cheon Seung-beom fight against corrupt officials.

== Cast ==
=== Main ===
- Lee Joon-gi as Bong Sang-pil
  - Lee Ro-woon as young Bong Sang-pil

A former gangster turned lawyer who takes advantage of loopholes in the law and boasts an excellent win rate. He was born in Kisung, but raised by his uncle Dae-woong in Seoul after his mother was killed. As a member of his uncle's gang, he became an excellent fighter. Prior to becoming a lawyer, he spent time in prison for his gang activities and has lived a life of hardship. As a lawyer he is not afraid to use his fists and his old gang connections when needed for a case. He is defined by his desire to gain justice for his mother, and his loyalty to Jae-yi. He trusts Jae-yi completely, even when his life, freedom, or work is on the line.

- Seo Yea-ji as Ha Jae-yi

A lawyer of integrity who ends up being temporarily disbarred after physically attacking a corrupt judge in court. Raised by her father after the disappearance of her mother, she returns to Kisung jobless and in disgrace, but chances upon Sang-pil, who offers her an opportunity to regain her license. Before her return to Kisung, she thought highly of Moon-sook as a role model. Having learned the truth, however, she is relentless in seeking justice for her mother and Sang-pil. Described by actress Seo Yea-ji as unable to hold in her anger, she does not back down when she is in the right. As a strong, independent woman, she is an equal partner with Sang-pil and protects those she loves. She is loyal to Sang-pil even when others, such as her father, oppose her relationship with him.

- Lee Hye-young as Cha Moon-sook

A senior judge who is highly respected but corrupt and greedy. She appears noble, caring, and just, and will go through great lengths to protect that reputation. She has ordered murders, rigged trials, run a corrupt charity for her own gain, and chosen city leaders favorable to her cause. The antagonist of the series, she manipulates others with ease. She is a formidable opponent to any who cross her and shows no remorse for her past actions.

- Choi Min-soo as Ahn Oh-joo

A former gangster, he is also the boss of a large corporation and the mayor of Kisung. He is a dangerous, unscrupulous man who tries to hide his ugly past and true colors. While he wishes to distance himself from his old associates, he still uses them to protect his goals. Once a loyal fixer for Moon-sook's father, he came to support her as well. He is charismatic and can easily convince others to do his bidding. Defined by his ambition and love for money, he will do anything to gain a higher position in life.

=== Supporting ===
==== Lawless Law Firm ====
- Kim Byung-hee as Tae Kwang-soo

A former gangster who manages the field team at the law firm. His life was saved by Sang-pil, who then went to prison for doing so. Since then, he has been fiercely loyal to Sang-pil, and does not hesitate to do whatever he is asked to do. As a former gangster, he has some fighting skills, but he is also good skill with technology. He is determined to study law and become a lawyer himself.

- Lim Ki-hong as Keum Kang

Former manager of the loan shark company that became the Lawless Law Firm. He continues to work at the firm and often takes the lead in field activities. While not as skilled as others in the firm, he gives his full effort to his tasks. He once decided to study law, but gave it up after struggling to understand the law books.

- Seo Ye-hwa as Keum Ja

Sister of Keum Kang, she is hired at the law firm after demonstrating her efficiency. She is good with numbers, and can determine the value of something quickly. Often she is the key to the success of the field team. Not afraid to speak her mind and share her feelings, she is also not easily embarrassed. She is attracted to lawyers and has the desire to marry one someday.

==== People around Cha Moon-sook ====
- Yeom Hye-ran as Nam Soon-ja

Assistant to Moon-sook. While not officially holding a job, she is known as the person to go through to get to Moon-sook. Willing to do anything that is asked, she often communicates the orders for dirty deeds. She is constantly suspicious of Oh-joo and does not understand why Moon-sook favors him. Her foremost desire is for her daughter to have a good life.

- Cha Jung-won as Kang Yeon-hee

A prosecutor and daughter of Soon-ja. She has been rivals with Jae-yi since their days in law school. While an intelligent and passionate woman, she allows her pride to get the best of her. After being embarrassed while losing a case to Sang-pil, she joins Moon-sook's side. Her desire is to continue advancing her career and to have the respect of others.

- Jeon Jin-gi as Ko In-doo

A former judge turned top lawyer at Oh-joo's company. Seen as a high-powered lawyer, many consider it an honor to be defended by him in court. At Moon-sook's orders, however, he often sabotages the cases to make it hard for his clients to win. He is motivated by the money and power such corrupt actions bring him.

==== People around Ahn Oh-joo ====
- Choi Dae-hoon as Suk Kwan-dong Campaign manager and assistant to Oh-joo. From Kisung, he went to Seoul to start his own gang, but was forced to return. He is not afraid to resort to force and even murder to get his way. Since being given a second chance by Oh-joo after his return, he has carried out his orders. His first loyalty, however, is to money and any method by which he can acquire it.
- Lee Dae-yeon as Woo Hyung-man

A police detective under Oh-joo's influence. At one time, he was an honorable police officer. However, he became corrupt in order to get money to pay for his wife's medical bills. Once ordered to kill Sang-pil and Hyung-joo, he has allowed Oh-joo to think he had done so. Defined by his love for his wife, he has allowed it to overcome his sense of right and wrong.

==== People around Bong Sang-pil ====
- Shin Eun-jung as Choi Jin-ae

A lawyer and the mother of Sang-pil. A single parent, she raised her son while running her own law firm. She is known for her commitment to her clients, and looks out for them even when they do not request help. While a friend of Moon-sook, she is willing to reveal Moon-sook's crimes due to her integrity. She did not approve of her brother's activity as a gangster and, at the time of her death, was not on speaking terms with him.

- Ahn Nae-sang as Choi Dae-woong

A leading gangster in Seoul and uncle of Sang-pil. He raised Sang-pil as his own child following the death of his sister Jin-ae, and supported his schooling as a lawyer despite only discovering Sang-pil's existence after Jin-ae's death. Jin-ae had not been on speaking terms with him due to their differing lifestyles. Despite being the leader of a gang, he has a strong sense of honor and does not believe in murder. Even though he desires justice for his sister, he repeatedly warns Sang-pil that revenge is not the answer. He cares deeply for his nephew and those close to him, and puts their safety above money, the gang, and his own life.

- Park Ho-san as Cheon Seung-beom

A determined public prosecutor who helps Sang-pil and Jae-yi. Sang-pil highly respects him as he had crossed paths with the prosecutor during his time in a gang (Seung-beom was the prosecutor who sent him to jail). Not swayed by power, money, or pressure, he cares more about the case and getting justice rather than promotion. Seung-beom does what he thinks is best regardless of what his superiors tell him to do. He is defined by his sense of justice and desire to unravel corruption at all costs.

- Park Min-jung as Yoo Kyung-jin

==== People around Ha Jae-yi ====
- Lee Han-wi as Ha Ki-ho

Photo studio owner, father of Jae-yi, and husband of Hyung-joo. Having raised Jae-yi as a single parent since her mother's sudden disappearance, he has gone through hardship to support her. Due to the costs of her law degree, he owes loan sharks a good amount of money. An ardent supporter of Moon-sook, he does not approve of any who criticize her. He initially opposes the relationship between Jae-yi and Sang-pil due to the latter's delinquent past.

- Baek Joo-hee as Noh Hyun-joo

Photographer, massage therapist, and mother of Jae-yi. Due to her evidence of Moon-sook's crimes, Oh-joo ordered Woo Hyung-man to kill her, but the latter spared her life instead. While assumed dead, she actually survived by hiding in Thailand. Having returned to Kisung, she desires to bring Moon-sook down so Jae-yi will not get hurt. Even though she saved Sang-pil's life when he was younger, she initially disapproves of his relationship with Jae-yi.

- Kim Kwang-kyu as Kong Jang-Soo

Police officer and formerly the lead detective in charge of the Choi Jin-ae and Noh Hyung-joo cases back in the day. He later meets their now-adult children and agrees to help them piece together the evidence in order to bring Cha Moon-sook's crimes to light.

=== Others ===
- Jung Young-hoon
- Lee Bok-gi
- Baek Joo-hee as Noh Hyun-joo
- Kim Ki-hyun
- Chang Ryul as Detective (ep. 4-5)
- Kim Dong-gyu
- Kim Chang-hee
- Yoon Joon-ho
- Kim Min-geon
- Park Shin-woon
- Park Sung-gyun
- Son Min-ji
- Jeon Bae-soo
- Lee Ho-cheol

=== Special appearances ===
- Jin Seon-kyu as Motorcycle Officer Park (Ep. 1)
- Jeon Gook-hwan

== Episodes ==
No.	Title	Original release date
1	"Episode 1"	May 12, 2018
Jae-yi loses a case due to a judge with bias against women. She confronts him but is insulted and ends up assaulting him. She is suspended as a lawyer for six months and fired from her job, forcing her to return to Kisung. Sang-pil receives a book with details on the crimes of those in power Kisung. He informs Dae-woong that he will go back to Kisung because of Jae-yi and also to avenge his mother. In Kisung, Sang-pil learns a loan shark firm run by Keum Kang is located in the old office of his mother. He intends to evict them but ends up using his uncle's name to take over the loan shark firm. Jae-yi learns that her father is deeply in debt to the loan shark. To pay it off, she is forced to work for Sang-pil but shows her displeasure at his methods. The firm is converted to the Lawless Law Firm. Sang-pil announces his intention to take over the defense of Hyung-man, a detective accused of murder.
2	"Episode 2"	May 13, 2018
Detective Woo Hyung-man is about to go on trial for the murder of the mayor. Sang-pil is determined to steal the case from Ko In-doo and become the defense lawyer. He uses a few methods to get Hyung-man to agree, including a fake murder attempt. Jae-yi confronts Sang-pil about his methods, but starts to believe that Hyung-man is innocent. After Sang-pil reveals to Hyung-man that he is the young boy he tried to kill years before, Hyung-man agrees to change lawyers. Jae-yi meets with Judge Cha Moon-sook, who she admires, and reveals her conflict about Sang-pil. She dislikes his methods, but is intrigued by him. Meanwhile, Moon-sook reveals to Oh-joo that she has chosen him to be the next mayor, and tells him to start a campaign. Kwan-dong returns to Kisung and begs Ahn Oh-joo to take him back. At Oh-joo's order, he kidnaps Jae-yi to force Sang-pil to give up defending Hyung-man. Sang-pil rescues Jae-yi while Tae Kwang-soo and Keum Kang cause a scene in the courtroom to cover Sang-pil's absence.
3	"Episode 3"	May 19, 2018
The trial of Hyung-man begins with Kang Yeon-hee as prosecutor. The employees of the Lawless Law Firm are arrested for causing a disturbance in court. Sang-pil also goes to jail, as he is the owner and implicated in their action. As they will only get out before the next hearing, he trusts Jae-yi to prepare the defense in his place. While in jail, they approach a former Minister of Finance who may have information on the murder. Jae-yi finds a witness and video evidence to alibi Hyung-man. After Sang-pil is released, the trial goes well. But to win, he realizes he must catch the real murderer, since Moon-sook will rig the trial. Sang-pil and Jae-yi get closer and she begins to have feelings for him. Meanwhile, Oh-joo plots to get rid of the real killer and Moon-sook to disqualify the evidence. Oh-joo injures Kwang-soo for failing him but then forgives him and decides to leave Sang-pil alone for now. When chasing the real murderer, Sang-pil risks his life to save Jae-yi and takes a knife stab for her. She begins to wonder why he cares so much and if there is more to his background.
4	"Episode 4"	May 20, 2018
Sang-pil and Jae-yi report the confession of the murderer, but the police do not accept it. Thus, the law firm begins to look into the hitman's past to find something they can use in court. Jae-yi learns that Sang-pil and others believe that Moon-sook is corrupt. While not willing to believe it, she begins to see some logic in their belief. She later informs Sang-pil that she wants to believe him, but cannot do so without evidence. Sang-pil reveals to Yeon-hee that Oh-joo is behind the death of the former mayor. Moon-sook plots with Nam Soon-ja to cover up the evidence and later rejects it and a witness in court. She confronts Sang-pil and tells him he has the same flaws as his mother, but does not know Jae-yi is listening. Oh-joo begins his campaign for mayor and works behind the scenes to sabotage the trial. Kwan-dong murders a key witness.
5	"Episode 5"	May 26, 2018
Sang-pil is hesitant to give the evidence he has on Moon-sook to Jae-yi, worried that she will get hurt. He and Jae-yi find a new witness and he testifies in court that Oh-joo's secretary ordered the murder. Sang-pil tells Yeon-hee that he believes her to be upright, and warns her that she has a mole on her team. Yeon-hee investigates and begins to think that Sang-pil may be right. Moon-sook tries to win Jae-yi back to her side, while working with Oh-joo to plan the future of Kisung. Oh-joo sends his secretary into hiding, and associates of Moon-sook keep the trial out of the news. Meanwhile, Jae-yi looks into Sang-pil's past. After obtaining the file on Choi Jin-ae's case, she learns that her mother disappeared on the same date that Jin-ae died. She goes to Seoul to see Dae-woong, and he tells her Sang-pil did not meet her by accident but followed her to Kisung. Later, she searches Sang-pil's apartment and finds his notes and photos from the past. She confronts him and he begins to tell her the things of the past.
6	"Episode 6"	May 27, 2018
Sang-pil tells Jae-yi the truth about everything and shows her the evidence he has. Later she confronts Hyung-man, who tells her he killed her mother. Jae-yi is grief stricken, but cannot bring herself to tell her father. Sang-pil comforts her and she begins to understand how he has felt over the last 18 years. Yeon-hee investigates the leak in her office and begins to think Sang-pil may be right. Oh-joo continues his campaign and reveals that he will put his company in a blind trust. Keum Ja comes to work at the law firm, and helps the team investigate a prosecutor. Sang-pil reveals in court that the prosecutor planted the evidence, and plays a video of it. Yeon-hee drops the charges against Hyung-man, and he is freed. However, she is embarrassed over this and caves on her principles, joining Moon-sook's side. Hyung-man contacts Hyung-joo, who is secretly still alive in Thailand. Sang-pil and Jae-yi confess their feelings for each other, kiss, and spend the night together. They agree to do everything as a team in the future, and obtain justice for their mothers.
7	"Episode 7"	June 2, 2018
Oh-joo is elected mayor and begins his term in office. Moon-sook pulls strings to reinstate Jae-yi as a lawyer, in an attempt to win her back and split her from Sang-pil. However, Jae-yi confronts her and becomes partner in the Lawless Law Firm. Hyung-man resigns from the police and collects his evidence on Oh-joo. He gives some of it to Sang-pil and Jae-yi as payment for their defense of him. Hyung-man then attempts to kill Oh-joo but fails and is murdered himself. The Lawless Law Firm begins to go through the evidence from Hyung-man but realize they will need help. Sang-pil and Jae-yi visit Seoul. Sang-pil meets Prosecutor Cheon Seung-beom and tells him of the corruption in Kisung. At the same time, Jae-yi gives details on Oh-joo to a journalist. Seung-beom comes to Kisung and investigates the holder of Oh-joo's slush fund. This puts Oh-joo's blind trust in jeopardy and Moon-sook uses this to gain control of it and his money. Hyung-joo returns from Thailand and observes her family from a distance.
8	"Episode 8"	June 3, 2018
Keum Ja is promoted to office manager in the law firm. Dae-woong learns that Hyung-joo is alive and has returned to Kisung. He visits her in secret to persuade her to leave before Moon-sook can find out she is still alive. When she refuses, he helps her infiltrate Moon-sook's household, but keeps it a secret. He also asks Sang-pil and Jae-yi to leave and live a normal life together in another place, but they refuse. Ha Ki-ho discovers the relationship between Jae-yi and Sang-pil, and orders her to leave him and return to Seoul. He is furious over her opposition to Moon-sook, as he is an ardent support of her. Jae-yi moves in with Keum Ja but allows Ki-ho to think she left for Seoul. Seung-beom investigates the bank president's crimes and starts to trace them to Oh-joo. Yet he is blocked from proving the connection to Oh-joo due to interference by Moon-sook. The law firm looks for other evidence they can turn over to Seung-beom. Dae-woong is kidnapped by Oh-joo and used as a trap to lure Sang-pil. An underling of Oh-joo kills Dae-woong in front of Sang-pil, and then frames Sang-pil for the murder.
9	"Episode 9"	June 9, 2018
Moon-sook is angry at Oh-joo for acting on his own and not requesting her permission. Oh-joo pleads with her that it was for her own good but a rift develops between them. Sang-pil is arrested and the law firm raided, turning up planted evidence. Seung-beom starts to investigate Sang-pil despite Jae-yi's appeal that he was framed. In jail, Sang-pil mourns his uncle while Jae-yi leads the law firm in developing a defense. Jae-yi visits Sang-pil often in jail and comforts him. She convinces Moon-sook to let him attend Dae-woong's funeral, in return for a favor. Sang-pil reveals to Seung-beom's investigator that he is the son of Jin-ae. Jae-yi does well in trial but Oh-joo pays off witnesses and plants evidence. Ki-ho learns that Jae-yi did not leave for Seoul and begs her to abandon Sang-pil. However, she refuses to do so and reveals her love for Sang-pil and opposition to Moon-sook. Dae-woong's gang believes Sang-pil is the murderer and threatens him. One of their members stabs him in prison, nearly killing him. Meanwhile, Moon-sook is offered a position on the Supreme Court.
10	"Episode 10"	June 10, 2018
Seong-pil lives and stays in the hospital to recover. Jae-yi visits and promises she will give everything to protect him just as he has done for her. They reaffirm their love for one another. Jae-yi then decides to use Sang-pil's methods so she can win against the corrupt court. Without revealing whom she is, Hyung-joo tells Jae-yi of the rift between Moon-sook and Oh-joo. Jae-yi and Sang-pil exploit this by sowing further seeds of doubt to each side. Under Jae-yi's direction, the law firm continues to build a defense case. Moon-sook meets with the new leader of Dae-woong's gang and places it under her control. She then orders them to kill Sang-pil. At the hospital, they find Oh-joo is present in order to question Sang-pil. Moon-sook uses the opportunity to try and get rid of Oh-joo as well. Oh-joo and Sang-pil must work together to escape. Jae-yi exploits Oh-joo's bitterness against this attempt to make a deal with him. He agrees to reveal the real murderer and exonerate Sang-pil in order to get back at Moon-sook.
11	"Episode 11"	June 16, 2018
Oh-joo reveals in court that one of his bodyguards was the one who killed Dae-woong. This bodyguard turns himself in after Oh-joo promises to care for his family. The public believes Oh-joo had nothing to do with the murder, and revealed it out of a sense of honor. The media and the public praise him, to the anger of Moon-sook. Sang-pil is freed, but he and Jae-yi begin to suspect that Moon-sook is using their actions for her own ends. Sang-pil starts to worry that his goal of revenge will bring too much pain to Jae-yi. He wonders if he should give it up to protect her. Jae-yi starts to learn martial arts. Moon-sook is nominated to the Supreme Court. Oh-joo uses pictures from past crime to threaten her. Later Jae-yi leaks these to the media, leading Moon-sook to believe Oh-joo did so. To redirect the media, Moon-sook sets up an assault on herself so it will look like she is a victim. Hyung-joo meets Sang-pil and reveals whom she is but makes him promise to keep it from Jae-yi. She also begs him to leave Jae-yi.
12	"Episode 12"	June 17, 2018
After she is assaulted, Moon-sook is more popular than ever. Ki-ho leads a group of her supporters in a demonstration. Her position on the Supreme Court is nearly assured. Jae-yi suspects that Sang-pil is hiding something from her. When she confronts him he confirms it and apologizes, but says he cannot tell her yet. Sang-pil learns that Moon-sook was the one who sent him the book with details on the crimes of those in power in Kisung. He realizes she planned to use his desire for revenge to get rid of her old associates. This leads him to rethink his goals and strategy. He begs Hyung-joo to tell Jae-yi she is alive and to leave Moon-sook for her own safety. She refuses and insists on a scheme to further the revenge. The men of the Lawless Law Firm capture Kwan-dong and force him to give up evidence on Oh-joo. They then leak it to the media, who release it to the public. Jae-yi discovers that Hyung-joo is alive but that Sang-pil did not tell her. Hurt by this, she accuses him of only thinking about his own revenge.
13	"Episode 13"	June 23, 2018
Moon-sook finds out about Hyung-joo and has Dae-woong's old gang kidnap her. Jae-yi, avoiding Sang-pil, tries to get help from Oh-joo in return for a promise to defend him. However, Sang-pil begs her to trust him and give him time to save her mother. He threatens Moon-sook not to harm Hyung-joo and uses old gang connections to find her. His friend in the gang protects Hyung-joo while she is in captivity. Moon-sook uses Nam Soon-ja to order the death of Hyung-joo. She records Soon-ja giving the order so she can use it to get rid of her next. Sang-pil fakes the death of Hyung-joo with help from Kwang-soo and his friend in the gang. Moon-sook leaks the video of Soon-ja ordering the murder, and she is arrested. Oh-joo forgives Kwan-dong and they go on the run together. Moon-sook is satisfied, thinking that all has gone her way. Sang-pil brings Hyung-joo to Jae-yi. Hyung-joo confesses that she caused the rift between Jae-yi and Sang-pil. Jae-yi forgives Sang-pil and they make up. They then show the rest of the law firm their evidence and plan.
14	"Episode 14"	June 24, 2018
Sang-pil and Jae-yi decide to use Soon-ja and Oh-joo to get Moon-sook. Moon-sook chooses a judge she can trust to oversee the trial. Jae-yi investigates him to look for evidence of corruption. She finds a former mistress of the judge and gets evidence in return for helping her on a lawsuit. Sang-pil tells Soon-ja to switch lawyers from In-doo to him. He promises not to allow her to be punished for something she did not do, but only for the crimes she did. In return, she would need to testify against Moon-sook. She agrees to the deal, and Yeon-hee provides evidence of Moon-sook's crimes. Seung-beom looks into Soon-ja and prepares to bring her to court. Sang-pil and Jae-yi inform him that the evidence he has ultimately came from Moon-sook. They ask him to see through the case to who is behind it. Seung-beom observes that Sang-pil and Jae-yi are now focused more on justice than revenge. Oh-joo kidnaps Jae-yi and uses her to lure Sang-pil, who he intends to kill.
15	"Episode 15"	June 30, 2018
Jae-yi gets away from Kwan-dong and stops Oh-joo from killing Sang-pil. She then uses the book sent to Sang-pil to convince Oh-joo that Moon-sook is the one he should blame. Sang-pil and Jae-yi tell Oh-joo to testify against Moon-sook so he does not go down alone. However, Oh-joo decides to kill Moon-sook instead. Oh-joo tries to approach to kill her, but she is too well guarded. Thus, he contacts Sang-pil to ask for a deal, but later decides to flee the country instead. Meanwhile, Moon-sook threatens Soon-ja over Yeon-hee, to force her to take all blame. She also sets up witnesses against Soon-ja and gets ready for her Supreme Court confirmation. Before Oh-joo can leave, his old secretary approaches him although secretly working for Moon-sook. He stabs Oh-joo and kills Kwan-dong, but Sang-pil interrupts before he can kill Oh-joo. Soon-ja decides not to testify, in order to protect Yeon-hee's future.
16	"Episode 16—Final Episode"	July 1, 2018
Jae-yi confronts Soon-ja and gets her to change her mind about testifying. Soon-ja testifies in court about Moon-sook's crimes. However, In-doo testifies against her to get rid of her credibility. Oh-joo burns his money, deciding to die where he has lived instead of letting Moon-sook go. He shows up to court and reveals all her crimes. Moon-sook tries to dismiss it all as a plot against her by two bitter criminals. However, Hyung-joo reveals she is alive and testifies as well. Moon-sook and her associates are arrested and she is later sentenced to life in prison. Oh-joo escapes from the police and commits suicide in the place where he got his first start as a gangster. Months later, Seung-beom comes back to Kisung to visit Sang-pil and Jae-yi. He asks them to come to Seoul and work for him as prosecutors in the special branch, and they agree. They leave the law firm in Kisung to Kwang-soo, who attends law school, and the rest of the employees.

== Production ==
In early 2018, Namoo Actors revealed that Lee Joon-gi was in talks to play a lawyer in an upcoming drama. However, details of the drama and its release date remained unknown. Then in February, Lee Joon-gi confirmed that he had been cast as the male lead. It would be his first production with director Kim Jin-min since Time Between Dog and Wolf in 2007. Soon after, Seo Yea-ji was confirmed as the female lead opposite Lee Joon-gi.

The first script reading took place on February 28, 2018 at Studio Dragon in Sangam-dong, Seoul, South Korea. The results of the script reading reportedly helped Studio Dragon to build confidence in the drama.

== Original soundtrack ==
Lawless Lawyer OST

Soundtrack album by Various Artists
- Released: 2018
- Genre: Soundtrack
- Languages: Korean; English
- Label: Stone Music Entertainment

=== Part 1 ===
Released on May 19, 2018
No.	Title	Lyrics	Music	Artists	Length
1.	"Burn It Up"	iamnot	iamnot	iamnot	3:06
2.	"Burn It Up" (Inst.)		iamnot		3:06
Total length:					6:12

=== Part 2 ===
Released on June 2, 2018
No.	Title	Lyrics	Music	Artist	Length
1.	"Memories"	Park Woo-sang	Park Woo-sang	Babylon	3:31
2.	"Memories" (Inst.)		Park Woo-sang		3:31
Total length:					7:02

=== Part 3 ===
Released on June 23, 2018
No.	Title	Lyrics	Music	Artists	Length
1.	"When Our Eyes Met" (눈이 마주칠 때)	Star Warz	Athena; Star Warz	Kim Yeon-ji	3:21
2.	"When Our Eyes Met" (Inst.)		Athena; Star Warz		3:21
Total length:					6:42

=== Part 4 ===
Released on June 30, 2018
No.	Title	Lyrics	Music	Artists	Length
1.	"Livin' in the City"	PULLIK	Ma Sang-woo	PULLIK	3:00
Total length:					3:00

Disc 2:
No.	Title	Artist	Length
1.	"Big Picture"	Various Artists	2:39
2.	"Establishment of Lawless City"	Various Artists	2:49
3.	"Facing Evil"	Various Artists	7:19
4.	"I'll Protect You"	Various Artists	2:25
5.	"Judgement rather than revenge"	Various Artists	2:33
6.	"Muvengers"	Various Artists	1:42
7.	"7 people Association"	Various Artists	4:21
8.	"Their Past"	Various Artists	2:28

== Viewership ==
Lawless Lawyer : South Korea viewers per episode (millions)

Season	Episode number																Average
Season	1	2	3	4	5	6	7	8	9	10	11	12	13	14	15	16	Average
1	1.256	1.399	1.214	1.403	1.463	1.706	1.473	1.433	1.267	1.705	0.963	1.648	1.163	1.707	1.636	2.115	1.472

Source: Audience measurement performed nationwide by Nielsen Media Research.

Average TV viewership ratings
Ep.	Original broadcast date	Average audience share		
Ep.	Original broadcast date	AGB Nielsen		TNmS
Ep.	Original broadcast date	Nationwide	Seoul	Nationwide
1	May 12, 2018	5.275%	5.895%	5.8%
2	May 13, 2018	6.037%	6.291%	5.6%
3	May 19, 2018	5.029%	5.081%	5.2%
4	May 20, 2018	6.132%	6.814%	5.1%
5	May 26, 2018	5.884%	6.070%	5.9%
6	May 27, 2018	6.885%	6.702%	5.2%
7	June 2, 2018	5.879%	5.879%	6.0%
8	June 3, 2018	6.085%	6.253%	6.9%
9	June 9, 2018	5.623%	5.925%	6.1%
10	June 10, 2018	6.843%	7.324%	6.9%
11	June 16, 2018	4.028%	5.018%	N/A
12	June 17, 2018	6.754%	7.244%	6.1%
13	June 23, 2018	5.050%	5.248%	5.5%
14	June 24, 2018	7.089%	7.570%	7.2%
15	June 30, 2018	6.618%	7.155%	N/A
16	July 1, 2018	8.937%	9.721%	8.6%
Average		6.134%	6.512%	6.2%
In the table above, the blue numbers represent the lowest ratings and the red numbers represent the highest ratings.; N/A denotes that the rating is not known.; This series aired on a cable channel/pay TV which normally has a relatively smaller audience compared to free-to-air TV/public broadcasters (KBS, SBS, MBC and EBS).

== Awards and nominations ==
Year	Award	Category	Recipient	Result	Ref.
2018	2nd Seoul Awards	Best Supporting Actor (Drama)	Park Ho-san	Nominated	
2018	StarHub Night of Stars	Best Male Asian Star	Lee Joon-gi	Won	

For her portrayal of an honest lawyer, Seo Yea-ji was named as an honorary police officer.

== International broadcast ==
- The series aired in the U.S., Taiwan, Malaysia, Singapore, Indonesia, the Philippines, and Thailand at the same time as its Korean broadcast. Later, it aired in Japan in August on Mnet Japan. In Thailand, the series was re-broadcast on free-to-air Channel 7 HD every Sunday from 10:00am to 12:00pm, starting on November 17, 2024.
- In Malaysia, the series was broadcast on 8TV every Wednesday and Thursday at 10:30pm to 11:30pm from May 16 to August 1, 2018.
- In the Philippines, the series was aired on UNTV in 2022.
- In India the series was available on MX Player in Hindi dubbed episodes from 2023.

== Adaptations ==
A Thai adaptation titled Law-Less was broadcast from May 17 to July 6, 2024 on True Asian More, a channel on TrueVisions. The series starred Thanat Lowkhunsombat, Tipnaree Weerawatnodom, and Panadda Wongphudee, with Napatkorn Mitr-em.
