= Doin' It =

Doin' It or Doing It may refer to:

== Books ==
- Doing It (novel), 2004 novel by Melvin Burgess
- Doing It: Let's Talk About Sex, 2017 book by Hannah Witton

== Music ==
- Doin' It, 1969 album by Spanky Wilson
- Doin' It, 2001 album by Papa Grows Funk
- "Doin' It" (LL Cool J song), 1996
- "Doin' It" (Liberty X song), 2001
- "Doing It" (Charli XCX song), 2014
- "Doin' It" (Big Boi song), 2019
- "Doin' It", song by Herbie Hancock on the album Secrets

== Other uses ==
- "Doing it", a slang phrase for sexual intercourse

== See also ==
- Do It (disambiguation)
