= Doit =

Doit may refer to:

- Digital Opportunity Investment Trust
- A doit musical ornamentation in jazz
- Duit, currency

== See also ==
- Comrade Deuch (born 1942), Cambodian activist, prison administrator, and defendant Kang Kek Iew
