= Baek Joo-hee =

South Korean actress (born 1976)

- Born: 29 November 1976 (age 49); South Korea
- Other name: Baek Ju-hee
- Education: Wonkwang University (Department of Dance)
- Occupation: Actress
- Years active: 2000–present
- Agent: Sem Company
- Known for: Today's Webtoon; Lawless Lawyer; Extrecurricular

Korean name
- Hangul: 백주희
- RR: Baek Juhui
- MR: Paek Chuhŭi

Baek Joo-hee (Korean: 백주희; born 29 November 1976) is a South Korean actress. She is known for her roles in drama such as My Name, Extracurricular, Lawless Lawyer, Crazy Love and Today's Webtoon. She also appeared in movies Someone Behind You, Homme Fatale, Start-Up and Hostage: Missing Celebrity.

== Career ==
Baek starred in her first Netflix original series Can This Love Be Translated? A romantic comedy written by the Hong sisters and directed by Yoo Young-eun for Netflix. It follows the relationship between Joo Ho-jin (Kim Seon-ho), a multilingual interpreter, and Cha Mu-hee (Go Youn-jung,), a top actress. Produced entirely under a pre-production system, principal photography took place in South Korea, Japan, Canada, and Italy. The 12-episode series was released globally on Netflix on January 16, 2026. Baek acted as Cho Young-ah, main writer of dating show Romantic Trip.

== Filmography ==
=== Television series ===
Year	Title	Role	Ref.
2018	Lawless Lawyer	Noh Hyun-joo	
2020	Extracurricular	Cho Mi-jung	
2020	Men Are Men	Jo Mi-ok	
2020	Hush	Lee Jae-eun	
2021	So Not Worth It	Hyun-min's mother	
2021	My Name	Kang Soo-yeon	
2021	Happiness	Park Min-ji	
2022	Crazy Love	Ma Eun-jung	
2022	Remarriage & Desires	Ha Yeong-seo	
2022	Today's Webtoon	Lim Dong-hee	
2022	Glitch	Seo Hwa-jeong	
2023	Doctor Cha	Baek Mi-hee	
2023	Moving	Motel Owner	
2024	Frankly Speaking	On Bok-ja	
2024	Goodbye Earth	Do Jeong-ah	
2024	Dreaming of a Freaking Fairy Tale	Hwang So-ra	
2024	Your Honor	Jo Mi-yeon	
2026	Can This Love Be Translated?	Cho Young-ah	

=== Film ===
Year	Title	Role	Ref.
2007	Someone Behind You	Hyun-joong's mother	
2019	Homme Fatale	Yeol-nyeo	
2019	Start-Up	Ticket counter staff	
2021	Hostage: Missing Celebrity	Detective Oh	
2022	Boogie Nights	Ma-dam	
2023	The Point Men	Debate program pd	
2023	Smugglers	Somers	
2025	Noise		

== Awards and nominations ==
Name of the award ceremony, year presented, category, nominee of the award, and the result of the nomination
Year	Award	Category	Nominee / Work	Result	Ref.
2004	10th Musical Awards	Best New Actress	Greece	Nominated	
2006	12th Musical Awards	Best Supporting Actress	Music in My Heart	Nominated	
2011	17th Musical Awards	Best Supporting Actress	Temptation of a Wolf	Nominated	
2012	6th The Musical Awards	Best Supporting Actress	Mr. Young Ae	Nominated	
2012	1st Yegreen Awards	Best Supporting Actress	Mr. Young Ae	Won	
