= GJan =

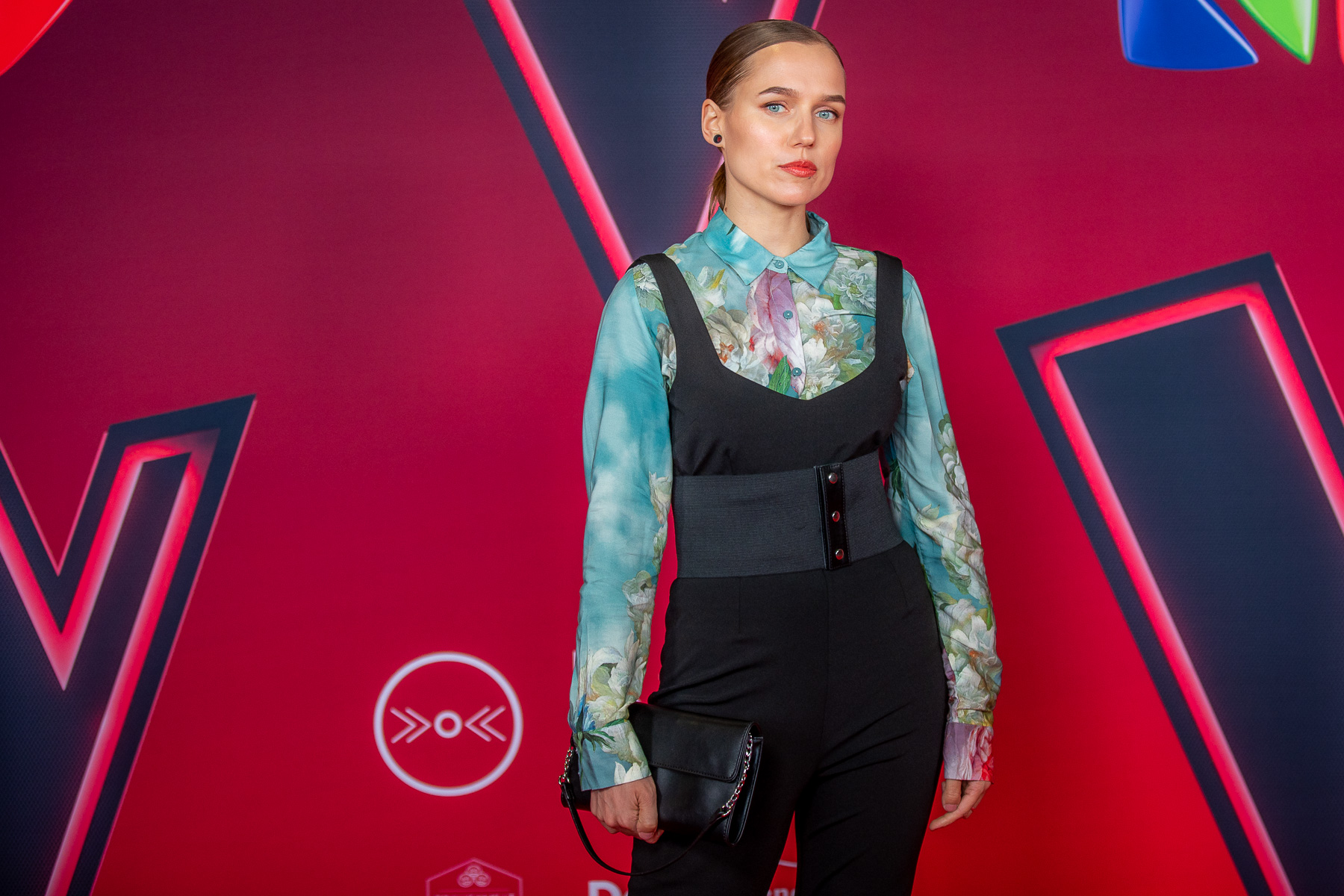
- GJan in 2023

Background information
- Born: Greta Jančytė; 24 April 1995 (age 31); Kaunas, Lithuania
- Genres: Pop
- Occupations: Singer, songwriter
- Instruments: Vocals, piano, guitar
- Years active: 2010–present
- Label: GJAN
- Website: www.gjanmusic.com

Greta Jančytė (born 24 April 1995), better known by her stage name GJan, is a Lithuanian singer and songwriter.

== Career ==
=== 2010–11: Second Riot career and departure ===
From 2010 to 2011, Greta performed in the Lithuanian rock group Second Riot. They released two songs, "Memories" and "Stalk". In the summer of 2011, Greta left the band due to disagreements with the other group members.

=== 2012–14: Beginning of a solo career and a one-year break ===
She became known for her YouTube videos. In October 2011, GJan published a cover of Katy Perry's song "E.T.". On April 9, 2012, she released her first solo single "Not Afraid", which got more than 5 million views on YouTube, followed by her second big hit "Tattoo", released on December 2, 2012 that received over 2 million views. Her third single "Need Your Love" was released on May 12, 2013. On November 17, 2013, she released the song "Now You". In 2012, GJan was nominated for the Best Music Video Award at M.A.M.A. awards, but lost to Jurga Šeduikytė. The following year, the singer was nominated for the Best Female Act at the same M.A.M.A. awards. In 2014, she took a year break to graduate from school. During the time, no new songs were released.

=== 2015–17: Do It ===
The single cover picture for her next single "Nobody Around" was released on March 28, 2015 on GJan's official Facebook page and the song was released on April 13. The day after release, "Nobody Around" reached number 1 on the Lithuanian iTunes chart. The song was also used in a commercial for "Active O2" water in Germany. The single cover picture for her next single, "One More Drink", was released on July 23, 2015 on GJan's official Facebook page. She released the song, accompanied by a music video on July 26. On August 4, 2015, "One More Drink" became available on iTunes. On November 26, 2015, GJan announced her next song "Gossip" on her Facebook page and shared the single cover picture, which had been painted by the singer herself. The song was subsequently released on December 1 on various platforms.

She released her song "Wild" on November 29, 2016. She released her song "Wasn't Easy" on March 21, 2017. In October 2017, new single "Together" was released with accompanying music video. On October 18, 2017 the debut album Do It was released through Global Records on various platforms such as Apple Music, Spotify, etc.

'Together' was the last song released through Global Records. GJan signed off a contract with Global Records to work on her own.

Greta Jančytė and her music partner Rokas Jansonas (Together GJan) released their first song in Lithuanian 'Paskui Tave' in November 2017. The song was only published in the Lithuanian record market, remaining censored in other countries. However, it reached a big audience and scored 6.7M views (stat. December 12, 2019) on YouTube.

=== 2018 ===
2018 began with another song in Lithuanian: 'Tabletė' (tr. Pill) was published on March 6, 2018 and currently (stat. 12th Dec, 2019) has 2.6M views on YouTube.

On May 23, 2018 GJan released 'Confidence' and reached 1.8M views (stat. 12th Dec, 2019) on YouTube platform.

On July 30, 2018, GJan released another song 'Clothes Off' and reached almost 1M views (stat. 12th Dec, 2019) on YouTube platform.

On September 13, 2018GJan released a BoB Dylan cover of 'Ring them bells' dedicated to the movie 'Ashes in the snow'. It reached 1.1M views (stat. 12th Dec, 2019) on YouTube platform.

On November 14, 2018 GJan released her third Lithuanian song 'Melagė' (tr. Liar). The song received great success, taking a place in the top charts for a year. Song reached 6.3M views (stat. 12th Dec, 2019) on YouTube.

=== 2019 - New Album 'Pasiduodu Sau' ===
Year started with an English song 'Numbers'. It was released on 19 February 2019.

On April 16, 2019 GJan released 'Karaliai' (tr. Kings) song from coming Lithuanian Album. It has reached 3M views (stat. 12th Dec, 2019) on YouTube platform.

On August 13, 2019 Gjan released 'Neleisk Man Užmigt' (tr. Don't let me fall asleep). It reached 2M views on YouTube platform in two months.

On October 1, GJan released 'Ruduo' (tr. Autumn), which became super popular in an hour. It reached 4.2M views in two Months on YouTube Platform.

On October 21, GJan released her first Lithuanian music album 'Pasiduodu Sau', which was later promoted by a concert on October 24 at the Vilnius Siemens Arena, attended by over 3500 people, the largest of her career.

== Discography ==
=== Studio albums ===
| Title | Details | Peak chart positions |
| Title | Details | LTU |
|---|---|---|
| Do It | Released: 18 October 2017; Format: Digital download, CD | — |
| Pasiduodu Sau | Released: 21 October 2019; Format: Digital download, CD | 1 |

=== Singles ===
| Year | Title | Peak chart positions | Album |
| Year | Title | LTU | Album |
|---|---|---|---|
| 2012 | "Not Afraid" | — | Non-album singles |
| 2012 | "Tattoo" | — | Non-album singles |
| 2013 | "Need Your Love" | — | Non-album singles |
| 2013 | "Now You" | — | Non-album singles |
| 2015 | "Nobody Around" | 1 | Non-album singles |
| 2015 | "One More Drink" | 10 | Non-album singles |
| 2015 | "Gossip" | 25 | Non-album singles |
| 2016 | "Wild" | 3 | Do It |
| 2017 | | | Do It |
| 2017 | "Wasn't Easy" | 2 | Do It |
| 2017 | "Together" | 19 | Do It |
| 2017 | "Paskui Tave" | 1 | Pasiduodu Sau |
| 2018 | "Tabletė" | 2 | Pasiduodu Sau |
| 2018 | "Confidence" | 5 | Non-album singles |
| 2018 | "Clothes Off" | — | Non-album singles |
| 2018 | "Melagė" | 19 | Pasiduodu Sau |
| 2019 | "Numbers" | — | Non-album single |
| 2019 | "Karaliai" | 9 | Pasiduodu Sau |
| 2019 | "Neleisk Man Užmigt" | — | Pasiduodu Sau |
| 2019 | "Ruduo" | 1 | Pasiduodu Sau |
| 2021 | "Palikai" | — | Verkiu Raudonų Vyšnių Sode |

=== Other appearances ===
| Year | Title | Other performer(s) | Album |
|---|---|---|---|
| 2017 | "Ar tu esi tas?" | Marijonas Mikutavičius | Non-album singles |
| 2017 | "All That I Need" | Aquarius | Non-album singles |
| 2017 | "Phone" | Witt Lowry | "ICNPT" |

=== Music videos ===
List of music videos, showing year released and directors
| Year | Title | Director(s) |
|---|---|---|
| 2012 | "Not Afraid" | Rokas Jansonas |
| 2012 | "Tattoo" | Rokas Jansonas |
| 2013 | "Need Your Love" | Rokas Jansonas |
| 2013 | "Now You" | Rokas Jansonas |
| 2015 | "One More Drink" | Rokas Jansonas |
| 2016 | "Wild" | Roman Burlaca |
| 2017 | "Wasn't Easy" | Bogdan Păun |
| 2017 | "Together" | Roman Burlaca |
| 2018 | ''Paskui Tave'' | Rokas Jansonas |
| 2018 | ''Tabletė" | Rokas Jansonas |
| 2018 | "Confidence" | Rokas Jansonas |
| 2018 | "Clothes Off" | Rokas Jansonas |
| 2018 | ''Melagė" | Rokas Jansonas |
| 2019 | "Numbers" | Rokas Jansonas |
| 2019 | "Karaliai" | Rokas Jansonas |
| 2019 | "Neleisk man užmigt" | Rokas Jansonas |
| 2019 | "Ruduo" | Rokas Jansonas |

== Tours ==
- Karklė Music Festival (2013–2014)
- Granatos Live Music Festival (2013, 2015, 2017)

== Awards and nomination ==
| Year | Award | Category | Nominated Work | Result |
|---|---|---|---|---|
| 2012 | M.A.M.A. | Best Music Video | "Not Afraid" | Nominated |
| 2013 | M.A.M.A. | Best Female Act | Herself | Nominated |
| 2016 | M.A.M.A. | Best Female Act | Herself | Nominated |
| 2016 | M.A.M.A. | Best Music Video | "Wild" | Nominated |
| 2017 | M.A.M.A. | Best Female Act | Herself | Nominated |
