= Iamnot =

South Korean rock band

iamnot
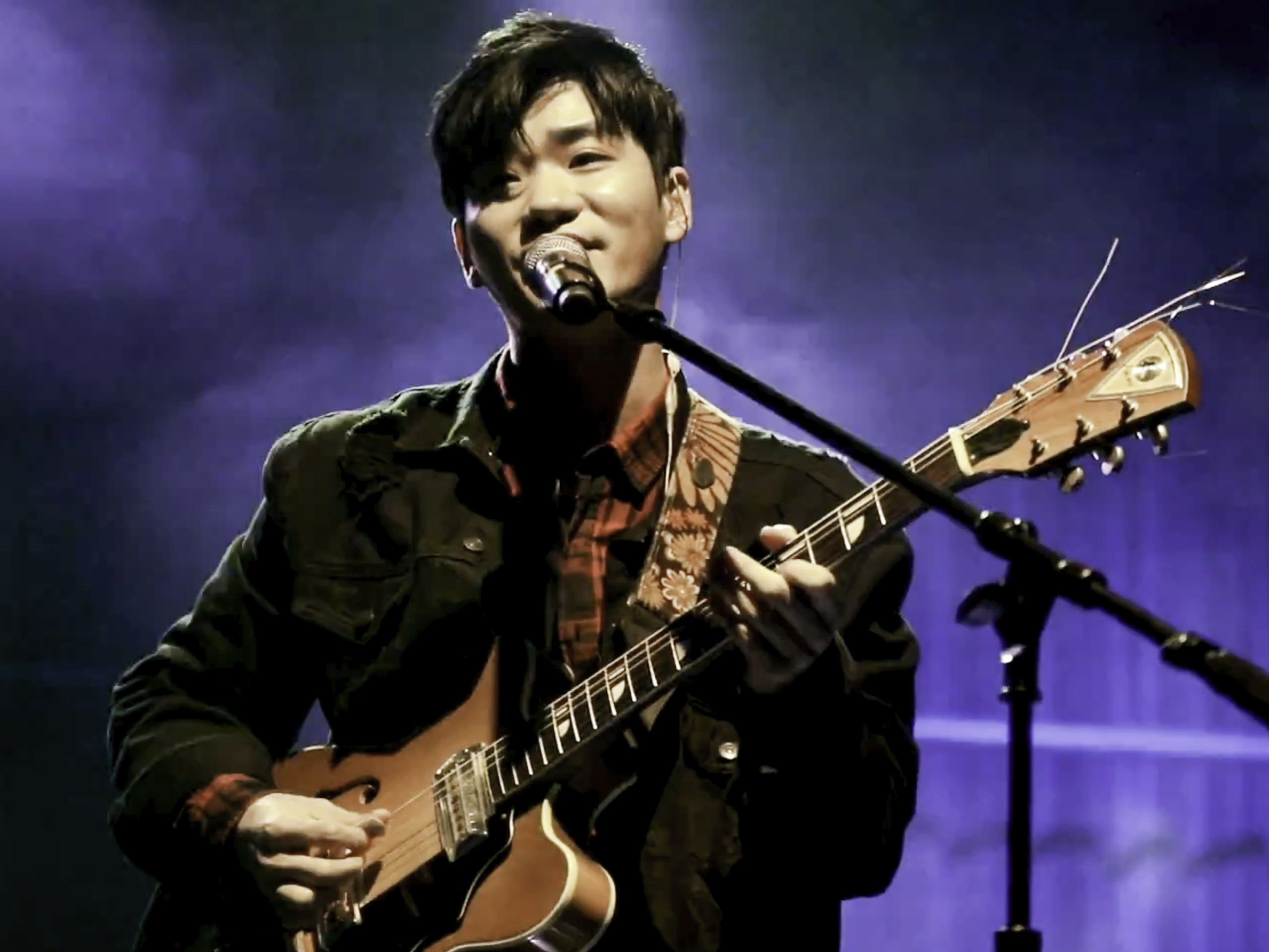
- Main vocalist Lim Heon-il in 2018

Background information
- Origin: Seoul, South Korea
- Genres: Blues, rock
- Years active: 2015–2018
- Label: Gravity Music
- Members: Lim Heon-il; Yang Si-on; Kim Jun-ho

iamnot (Korean: 아이엠낫) is a South Korean rock band signed to Gravity Music. The trio was formed with main vocalist and guitarist Lim Heon-il, bassist Yang Si-on, and drummer Kim Jun-ho. In 2015, they released a string singles and their debut mini-album Whoami. The band releasesd their first studio album Hope in 2017. Their work earned them the Band Award at the 27th Seoul Music Awards.

== History ==
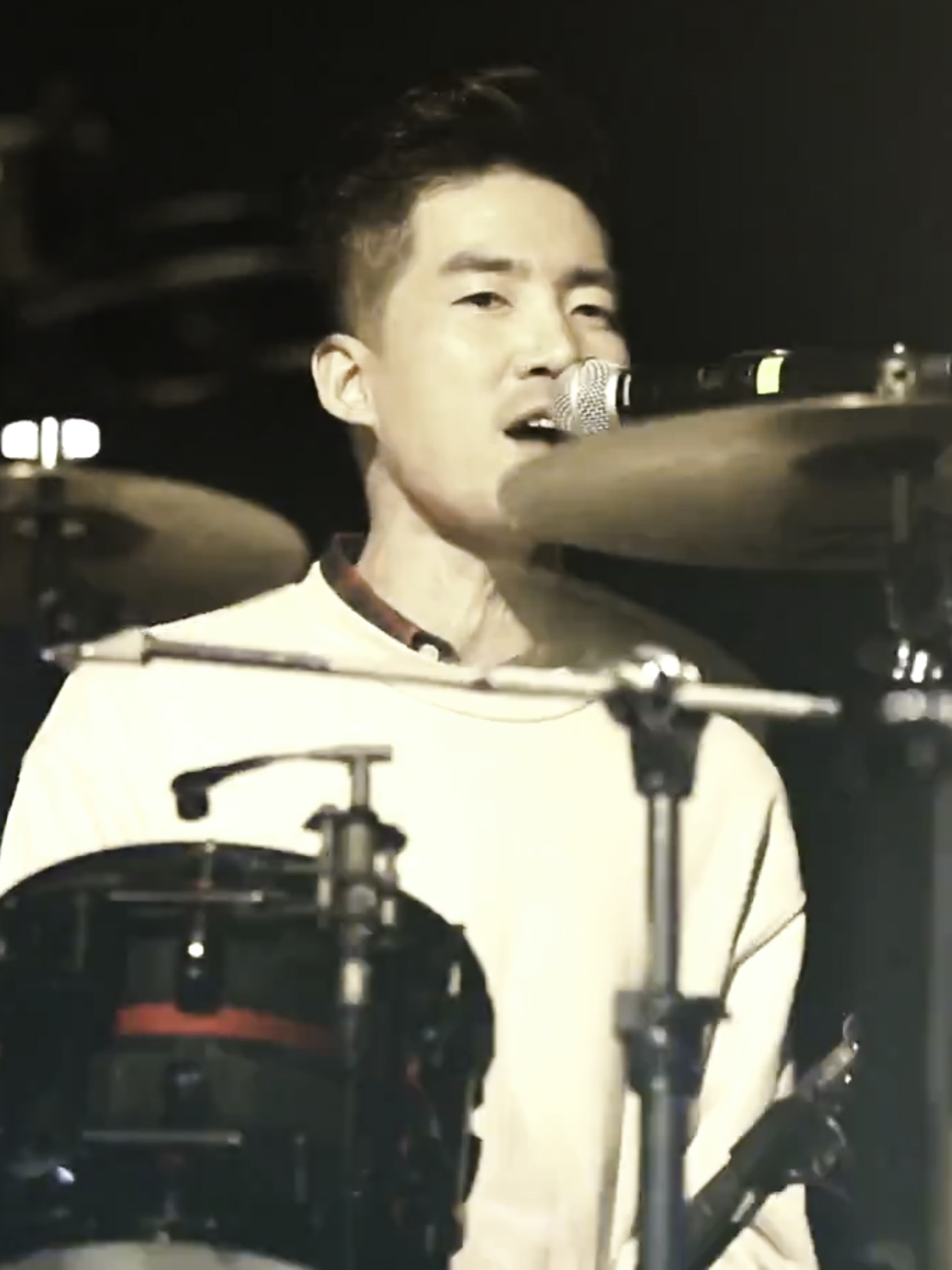
Drummer Kim Jun-ho in 2018

Lim Heon-il and Yang Si-on attended the same high school and they enrolled at the Seoul Institute of the Arts, where they met Kim Jun-ho. Along with two other students from the institution, they formed the rock band Bremen and released its sole studio album in 2006. They disbanded shortly due to their mandatory military service commitments. The members later worked independently from one another in separate bands: Lim with Mate (2009–2014), Yang in Walrus, and Kim for SpeakOut (2011). The trio regrouped and formed iamnot in 2015 with Lim on main vocals and guitar, Yang on bass, and Kim on drums. The name was written without any spaces to read like a band name and not as a sentence. Lim cited the precision of the negative expression "this is not" in contrast to the affirmative phrase "this is" that led to the decision of implementing the paradoxical moniker to describe their music.

iamnot released their debut single "The Brand New Blues" in April 2015, followed by "Do It" and "Heiyheiy" through August. Their first mini-album Whoami was issued on September 15, headed by the lead singles "Psycho" and "Cut". Writing for Herald Economy, Jung Jin-yeong called it "possibly one of the most important albums of the year". The band held a pair of concerts at Muse Live Hall in Seoul Olympic Park that weekend in commemoration of the album's release. They released the single album Hold the Night in December and the song "Break the Wall" the following year. Ahead of their first full-length album, iamnot released the songs "Happiness" and "RBTY" in 2017. Hope and the lead single "Fly" were released on May 26. Conceptually, the album relates to the struggles faced by the youth. In 2018, iamnot won the Band Award at the 27th Seoul Music Awards. They contributed a song entitled "Burn It Up" on the original soundtrack for TVN's television series Lawless Lawyer.

== Musical style ==
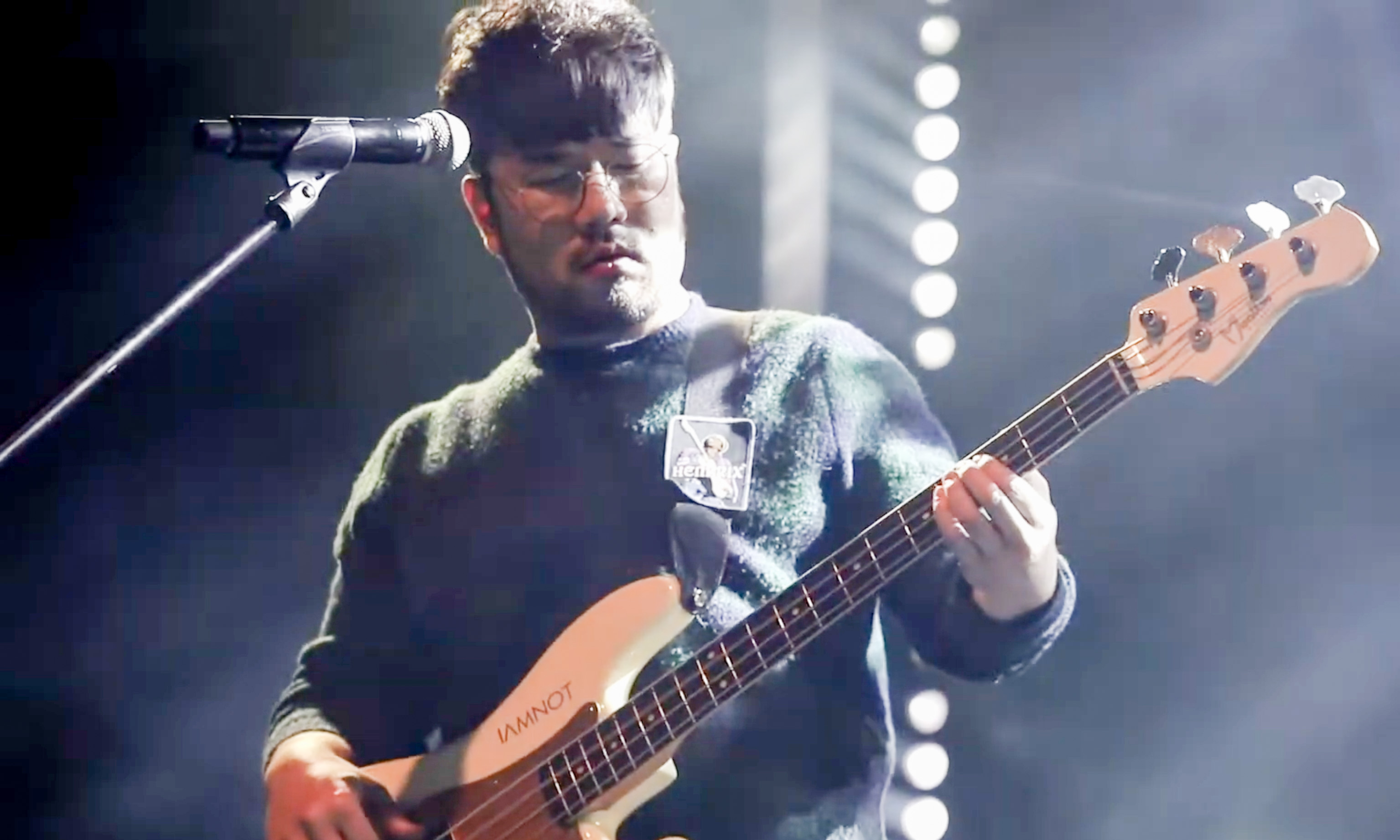
Bassist Yang Si-on in 2018

iamnot lays their musical foundation in blues and rock. The band forged their music as "a mixture of garage-rock-like guitar riffs and bluesy tones" and has delved into various genres, including punk rock and EDM. Their song "Do It" opens with a hip hop beat and progresses into an electric number with "intense" guitar riffs, "heavy" drums, and violin by Echae Kang. "Psycho" saw the band incorporate elements of EDM into the track, while the simultaneously released "Cut" infused trap music. With the release of Hope, the band's sound shifted from strong rock music to a more pop-oriented direction. The modern rock single "Happiness" expresses the band's desire to see the word become part of day-to-day life. Lim described the track's sound as "strong and bright". "RBTY" is an electronic dance-pop track with elements of country music. Its lyrics deal with redemption.

Lim's vocal tone has been compared to that of singer Yi Sung-yol. The frontman has been said to possess "crunchy low-keyed vocals" that are "laid-back" on occasion, "but retain that snarly tone that keeps listeners on edge". Online magazine Mint Paper commended his "stand-out" singing on the single album Color, where iamnot worked with groups Common Ground and The Barberettes on Motown-esque tracks. Kim's "clean high-key voice" has been described as complementary to Lim's. Both musicians contribute lyrics and compositions to the band's catalog; the latter also works as a beatmaker. Bassist Yang also plays the piano and guitar, while supplying synthesizers, arrangements, and record production.

== Members ==
List of members and instruments.

- Lim Heon-il (임헌일) – main vocals, guitar
- Yang Si-on (양시온) – bass
- Kim Jun-ho (김준호) – drums

== Discography ==
=== Albums ===
==== Studio albums ====
Title	Album details	Peak chart positions	Sales
Title	Album details	Gaon Album Chart	Sales
Hope	Released: May 26, 2017; Label: Gravity Music, Universal Music; Format: CD, digital download	29	KOR: 748

==== Extended plays ====
Title	Album details
Whoami	Released: September 15, 2015; Label: Self-released; Format: Digital download

=== Singles ===
==== As lead artist ====
Title	Year	Album
"The Brand New Blues"	2015	Non-album single
"Do It" (featuring Echae Kang)	2015	Whoami
"Heiyheiy"	2015	Whoami
"Psycho"	2015	Whoami
"Cut"	2015	Whoami
"Lalalala"	2015	Hold the Night
"Break the Wall"	2016	Non-album single
"Happiness"	2017	Hope
"RBTY"	2017	Hope
"Fly" (featuring Lee Seung-yul)	2017	Hope
"Be There" (그 자리에 있어줘; Geu Jarie Isseojwo)	2017	Non-album single
"Come Back"	2017	Non-album single
"Time" (시간; Sigan)	2017	Non-album single
"Up All Night"	2018	Color

=== Guest appearances ===
Title	Year	Release	Ref.
"Burn It Up"	2018	Lawless Lawyer OST	

== Awards and nominations ==
Year	Nominee / work	Award	Result	Ref.
2018	iamnot	Seoul Music Awards – Band Award	Won	
