= Tuxedo (album) =

Studio album by Tuxedo (Mayer Hawthorne and Jake One)
- Released: March 3, 2015
- Studios: Los Angeles, California; New York, New York; Seattle, Washington
- Length: 46:26
- Label: Stones Throw
- Producers: Greg Wells; Jake One; Mayer Hawthorne

Tuxedo (Mayer Hawthorne and Jake One) chronology
Tuxedo (2015)	Tuxedo II (2017)

Mayer Hawthorne chronology
The Big Knock (2014)	Tuxedo (2015)	Man About Town (2016)

Jake One chronology
The Stimulus Package (2010)	Tuxedo (2015)	#PrayerHandsEmoji (2016)

Tuxedo is the eponymous studio album by American funk duo Tuxedo. It was released on March 3, 2015 via Stones Throw Records. Recording sessions took place in Los Angeles, New York City and Seattle. Production was handled by members Mayer Hawthorne and Jake One, except for one song, which was produced with Greg Wells.

== Critical reception ==
Professional ratings
Aggregate scores
Source	Rating
Metacritic	69/100
Review scores
Source	Rating
AllMusic	3.5/5 stars
Exclaim!	9/10
The Arts Desk	4/5 stars
Uncut	7/10

Tuxedo was met with generally favourable reviews from music critics. At Metacritic, which assigns a normalized rating out of 100 to reviews from mainstream publications, the album received an average score of 69, based on eight reviews.

== Track listing ==
No.	Title	Writer(s)	Length
1.	"Lost Lover"	Andrew Mayer Cohen; Jacob Dutton; Nick Brongers; Amos Miller	3:33
2.	"R U Ready"	Cohen; Dutton; Samuel Benjamin Wishkoski	3:41
3.	"Watch the Dance"	Cohen; Dutton; Wishkoski	4:38
4.	"So Good"	Cohen; Dutton; Wishkoski	3:40
5.	"Two Wrongs"	Cohen; Dutton; Wishkoski	3:54
6.	"Tuxedo Groove"	Dutton; David Vaughn; Benji Demps	2:36
7.	"I Got U"	Cohen; Dutton; Wishkoski	3:35
8.	"The Right Time"	Cohen; Dutton; Wishkoski	4:06
9.	"Roll Along"	Cohen; Dutton	3:59
10.	"Get U Home"	Cohen; Dutton; Wishkoski	4:14
11.	"Do It"	Cohen; Dutton; Wishkoski	4:18
12.	"Number One"	Cohen; Dutton; Calvin Broadus; Ricardo Brown; Nathaniel Hale; Warren Griffin; Andre Young	4:12
Total length:			46:26

Sample credits

- Track 12 contains interpolations from "Ain't No Fun (If the Homies Can't Have None)" written by Calvin Broadus, Ricardo Brown, Nathaniel Hale, Warren Griffin and Andre Young.

== Personnel ==
- Andrew "Mayer Hawthorne" Cohen – guitar (tracks: 2, 3, 8, 12), bass (tracks: 1, 2, 4, 8-11), synthesizer, drums & programming (tracks: 1, 2, 4, 8, 9), producer, mixing (tracks: 4, 9-12), mastering
- Jacob "Jake One" Dutton – bass (tracks: 1, 2, 4, 8, 9), synthesizer, drums, producer, programming, mixing (tracks: 4, 9-12)
- Gavin Turek – backing vocals (tracks: 1-3)
- Moria Mir "JimiJames" Denson – backing vocals (track 9)
- Nick Brongers – guitar & strings (track 1)
- Amos Miller – synthesizer (track 1)
- Sam "Swish" Wishkoski – guitar (tracks: 5, 7), synthesizer (tracks: 2-6, 8, 10-12)
- Damon "Dam-Funk" Riddick – synthesizer (track 5)
- David Vaughn – synthesizer (track 6)
- Benji Demps – drums (track 6)
- Greg Wells – guitar, producer & mixing (track 9)
- Will Sessions – horns (tracks: 9, 10)
- Christian Wunderlich – guitar (tracks: 10, 11)
- Quincy McCrary – piano (track 10), keyboards (track 11)
- John Morales – mixing (tracks: 1-3, 5-9)
- Riley Mackin – mixing (tracks: 4, 10-12)
- Jean André – cover
- Piper Ferguson – photography

== Charts ==
Chart (2015)	Peak position
Belgian Albums (Ultratop Flanders)	62
Belgian Albums (Ultratop Wallonia)	159
Dutch Albums (Album Top 100)	34
