= Digital Opportunity Investment Trust =

United States federal trust proposal

Digital Opportunity Investment Trust (DOIT) is a proposal to create a United States federal trust to distribute, for educational purposes, funds to be raised by public auctions of licenses to use radio frequency bands.

== Concepts ==
According to advocates at the National Humanities Alliance, DOIT would receive funds from U.S. government lease revenues and distribute them through competitive grants for projects to (1) apply information technologies in education and skills training; (2) digitize collections of libraries, museums, universities and public television stations; and (3) develop tools for education and digital technology.

== U. S. government funding for humanities and arts ==
The National Endowment for the Humanities and the National Endowment for the Arts, created by the National Foundation on the Arts and the Humanities Act of 1965 (P.L. 89-209), currently have the largest shares of United States government funding for programs in humanities and arts. The FY 2006 appropriations for these two agencies are US$140.9 million and US$124.4 million. Appropriations in recent years (in US$ millions) are shown in the following table:

Fiscal Year	Humanities	Arts
1992	174.0	176.0
1993	177.4	174.5
1994	177.5	170.2
1995	172.0	162.3
1996	110.0	99.5
1997	110.7	98.0
1998	110.7	99.5
1999	110.7	98.0
2000	115.3	97.6
2001	120.0	104.8
2002	124.5	115.2
2003	124.9	115.7
2004	135.3	121.0
2005	138.1	121.3
2006	140.9	124.4

Potential funding for DOIT as described above, although relatively small as compared to United States government support for education (US$71,545 million in FY 2006), would represent a major increase above the funding levels historically provided for humanities and arts.

== Federal grants and demonstration projects ==
The Federation of American Scientists has received grants from the United States government to demonstrate the potential of a Digital Opportunity Investment Trust. US$1.34 million in funding was provided through three Congressional earmarks. These funds were used to write a report describing DOIT goals and organization and to supplement $0.58 million from four competitive grants in carrying out three prototype projects:

Immune Attack! -- an advanced video game teaching human immunology from the 9th grade to the college level

Discover Babylon -- a cultural, educational and historical virtual reality of ancient Mesopotamia (modern-day Iraq)

Mass Casualty Incident Responder -- a high-stress, interactive real-time decision-making training simulation to teach firefighters and serve as a model for other first responder training

The interactive projects were first demonstrated to the public at a briefing organized by New America Foundation, held in the meeting room at 188 Russell Senate Office Building, Washington, D.C., on May 3, 2006.

== Federal legislation ==
The Digital Promise Project has sought federal legislation for the proposed Digital Opportunity Investment Trust in the 108th and 109th U.S. Congresses. H.R. 1396 "Spectrum Commons and Digital Dividends Act of 2003" was sponsored in March 2003, by Rep. Edward J. Markey (D-MA) with cosponsors John B. Larson (D-CT) and Karen McCarthy (D-MO). S. 1854 "Digital Opportunity Investment Trust Act" was sponsored in November 2003, by Sen. Christopher J. Dodd (D-CT) with cosponsors Richard Durbin (D-IL) and Olympia J. Snowe (R-ME). Critics said H.R. 1396 was "really just old wine in a new bottle...the fusion of the National Endowment for the Arts, PBS, and the 'E-Rate' program...which is a federally mandated hidden tax on telephone bills." Although they helped introduce the concepts, the bills in the 108th Congress made little progress and expired at the close of the Congress.

S. 1023 "Digital Opportunity Investment Trust Act" was sponsored in May, 2005, by Sen. Christopher J. Dodd (D-CT) with cosponsors Conrad R. Burns (R-MT), Richard Durbin (D-IL), Olympia J. Snowe (R-ME) and Edward M. Kennedy (D-MA). As of spring, 2006, it is pending hearings in the Committee on Health, Education, Labor and Pensions. H.R. 2512 "Digital Opportunity Investment Trust Act" was sponsored in May, 2005, by Rep. Ralph Regula (R-OH) with cosponsors Paul E. Gillmor (R-OH), Edward J. Markey (D-MA), Rush D. Holt, Jr. (D-NJ), Major R. Owens (D-NY), Richard H. Baker (R-LA), Sherrod Brown (D-OH), Nita M. Lowey (D-NY), Allyson Y. Schwartz (D-PA), F. James Sensenbrenner, Jr. (R-WI), Frank R. Wolf (R-VA) and Rick Boucher (D-VA). As of spring, 2006, it is pending hearings in the Subcommittee on Select Education.

Although they carry the same title, S. 1023 and H.R. 2512 differ in some provisions. Both require 30 percent of the proceeds of each auction of radio frequency spectrum to be deposited in a United States federal trust fund, and both allocate 21 percent of the interest from the fund to educational television stations supported by the U.S. Corporation for Public Broadcasting. Both specify that the trust fund is otherwise to be used for the following purposes:

to help underwrite the digitization of the collections in the Nation's universities, museums, libraries, public broadcasting stations, and cultural institutions

to support basic and applied research, development, and demonstrations of innovative learning and assessment systems as well as the components and tools needed to create them

to use the research results developed...to create prototype applications designed to meet learning objectives in a variety of subject areas and designed for learners with many different educational backgrounds

S. 1023 authorizes the trust fund management to cooperate with business and nonprofit organizations by "seeking new ways to put telecommunications and information technologies to work in their areas of interest." H.R. 2512 makes use of the fund subject to Congressional appropriation, but S. 1023 does not. In that respect, the House bill follows the model of the Land and Water Conservation Fund, while the Senate bill follows a model similar to the Smithsonian Institution.
