= Do It (GJan album) =

Studio album by GJan
- Released: October 18, 2017
- Genre: Pop
- Length: 36:53
- Label: Global Records

Singles from Do It
- 1. "Wild" Released: November 22, 2016; 2. "Wasn't Easy" Released: March 21, 2017; 3. "Together" Released: October 4, 2017

Do It is the debut album by Lithuanian singer GJan, released on October 18, 2017, by Global Records.

== Track listing ==
Track listing adapted from Amazon.com.

No.	Title	Writer(s)	Length
1.	"Wild"	Greta Jančytė; Rokas Jansonas	3:29
2.	"7 Billion"	Jančytė; Jansonas	4:35
3.	"Do It"	Jančytė; Jansonas	3:42
4.	"Monsters"	Jančytė; Jansonas	3:41
5.	"Instructions"	Jančytė; Jansonas	3:41
6.	"Love Triangle" (featuring Saint)	Jančytė; Jansonas; William Jarratt	3:55
7.	"Torchlight"	Jančytė; Jansonas	3:16
8.	"Mountains" (featuring Gizzle)	Jančytė; Jansonas; Glenda Proby	3:22
9.	"Wasn't Easy"	Jančytė; Jansonas	3:58
10.	"Together"	Jančytė; Jansonas	3:14
Total length:			36:53
