= 33rd Golden Disc Awards =

2019 South Korean music awards ceremony

- Title card
- Sponsored by: U+ Idol Live; V Live; NetEase Music
- Date: January 5–6, 2019
- Location: Gocheok Sky Dome, Seoul
- Country: South Korea
- Hosted by: Lee Seung-gi; Park Min-young; Kang So-ra; Sung Si-kyung

Television/radio coverage
- Network: JTBC, JTBC2, JTBC4, Vlive, Paravi

The 33rd Golden Disc Awards ceremony was held from January 5 to 6, 2019. The JTBC network broadcast the show from the Gocheok Sky Dome in Seoul. Lee Seung-gi and Park Min-young served as hosts on the first day, with Kang So-ra and Sung Si-kyung on the second.

== Criteria ==
Albums and songs released between December 1, 2017, and November 30, 2018, were eligible to be nominated for the 33rd Golden Disc Awards. The awards committee decided to eliminate online voting from the criteria of the Grand Prize Golden Disc, Best Artist, and Rookie Artist of the Year awards; the winners were determined by music sales (70%) and 30 selected music experts (30%). The award for Most Popular Artist was determined 100% by fan votes.

== Winners and nominees ==
Winners are listed first in alphabetical order and emphasized in bold.

Digital Song Daesang (Song of the Year)	Album Daesang (Album of the Year)
**iKon – "Love Scenario"**; Big Bang – "Flower Road"; Blackpink – "Ddu-Du Ddu-Du"; Bolbbalgan4 – "Travel"; BTS – "Fake Love"; Chungha – "Roller Coaster"; Roy Kim – "Only Then"; Mamamoo – "Starry Night"; Momoland – "Bboom Bboom"; Twice – "Heart Shaker"	**BTS – Love Yourself: Answer**; Exo – Don't Mess Up My Tempo; Got7 – Eyes on You; Jonghyun – Poet | Artist; Monsta X – Take.1 Are You There?; NCT 127 – Regular-Irregular; NU'EST W – Who, You; Seventeen – You Make My Day; Twice – What Is Love?; Wanna One – 0+1=1 (I Promise You)
Digital Song Bonsang	Album Bonsang
**Big Bang – "Flower Road"**; **Blackpink – "Ddu-Du Ddu-Du"**; **Bolbbalgan4 – "Travel"**; **BTS – "Fake Love"**; **Chungha – "Roller Coaster"**; **iKon – "Love Scenario"**; **Roy Kim – "Only Then"**; **Mamamoo – "Starry Night"**; **Momoland – "Bboom Bboom"**; **Twice – "Heart Shaker"**	**BTS – Love Yourself: Answer**; **Exo – Don't Mess Up My Tempo**; **Got7 – Eyes on You**; **Jonghyun – Poet | Artist**; **Monsta X – Take.1 Are You There?**; **NCT 127 – Regular-Irregular**; **NU'EST W – Who, You**; **Seventeen – You Make My Day**; **Twice – What Is Love?**; **Wanna One – 0+1=1 (I Promise You)**; BtoB - This Is Us; Day6 - Shoot Me: Youth Part 1; Exo-CBX - Blooming Days; Hwang Chi-yeul - Be Myself; Infinite - Top Seed; JBJ - True Colors; NCT - NCT 2018 Empathy; Pentagon - Positive; Red Velvet - Summer Magic; Shinhwa - Heart; Taeyeon - This Christmas: Winter Is Coming; TVXQ - New Chapter # 1: The Chance of Love; Up10tion - Invitation; VIXX - Eau De Vixx; Winner - Everyday; WJSN - WJ Please?; Yang Yoseob - 白 (White)
Best Album
**Got7**
Best New Artist	Rookie Artist of the Year
**(G)I-dle**; fromis 9; Iz*One; JBJ95; Kim Dong Han; LOONA; Stray Kids; The Boyz; UNB; UNI.T	**Stray Kids**; **Iz*One**

=== Genre & Other Awards ===
Award	Winner
Best Hip Hop Award	Mino
Best OST Award	Paul Kim for "Every Day, Every Moment" from Should We Kiss First?
Best Ballad Award	Im Chang-jung
Best Male Group Award	Wanna One
Best Female Group Award	GFriend
Judges' Special Award	Bom Yeoreum Gaeul Kyeoul
Cosmopolitan Artist Award	BLACKPINK, Wanna One
2019 Global V Live Top 10 Best Artist	BTS
U+ Idol Live Popularity Award	BTS
NetEase Music Golden Disc Popularity Award	BTS

== Gallery ==
Award ceremony gallery

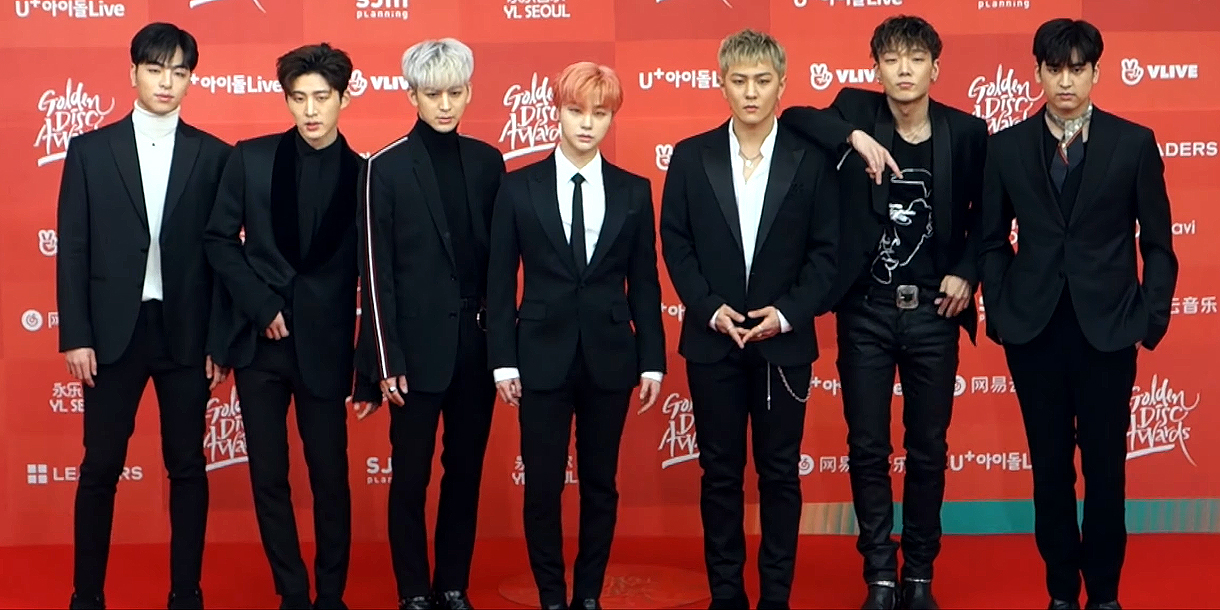
iKon

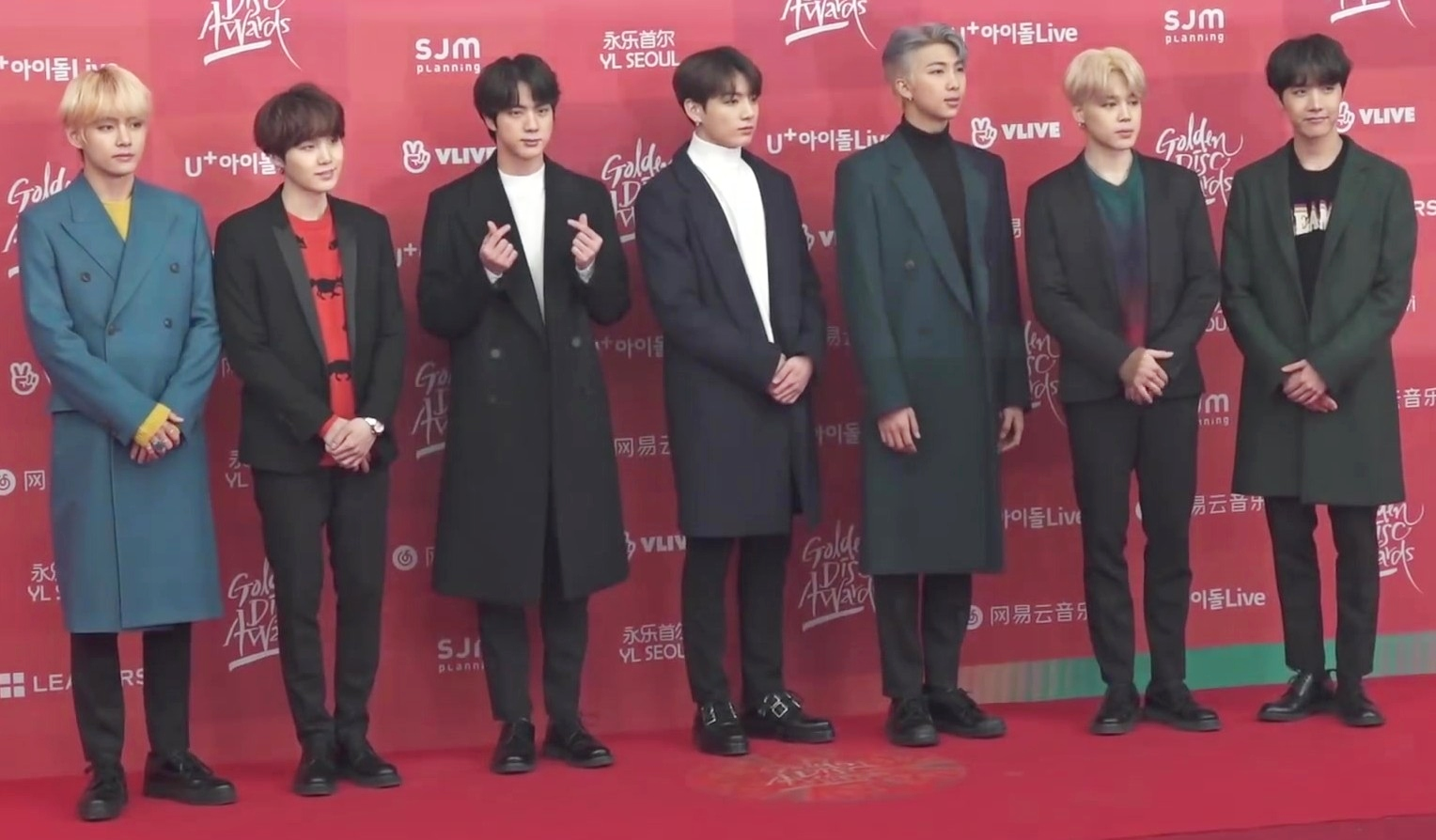
BTS

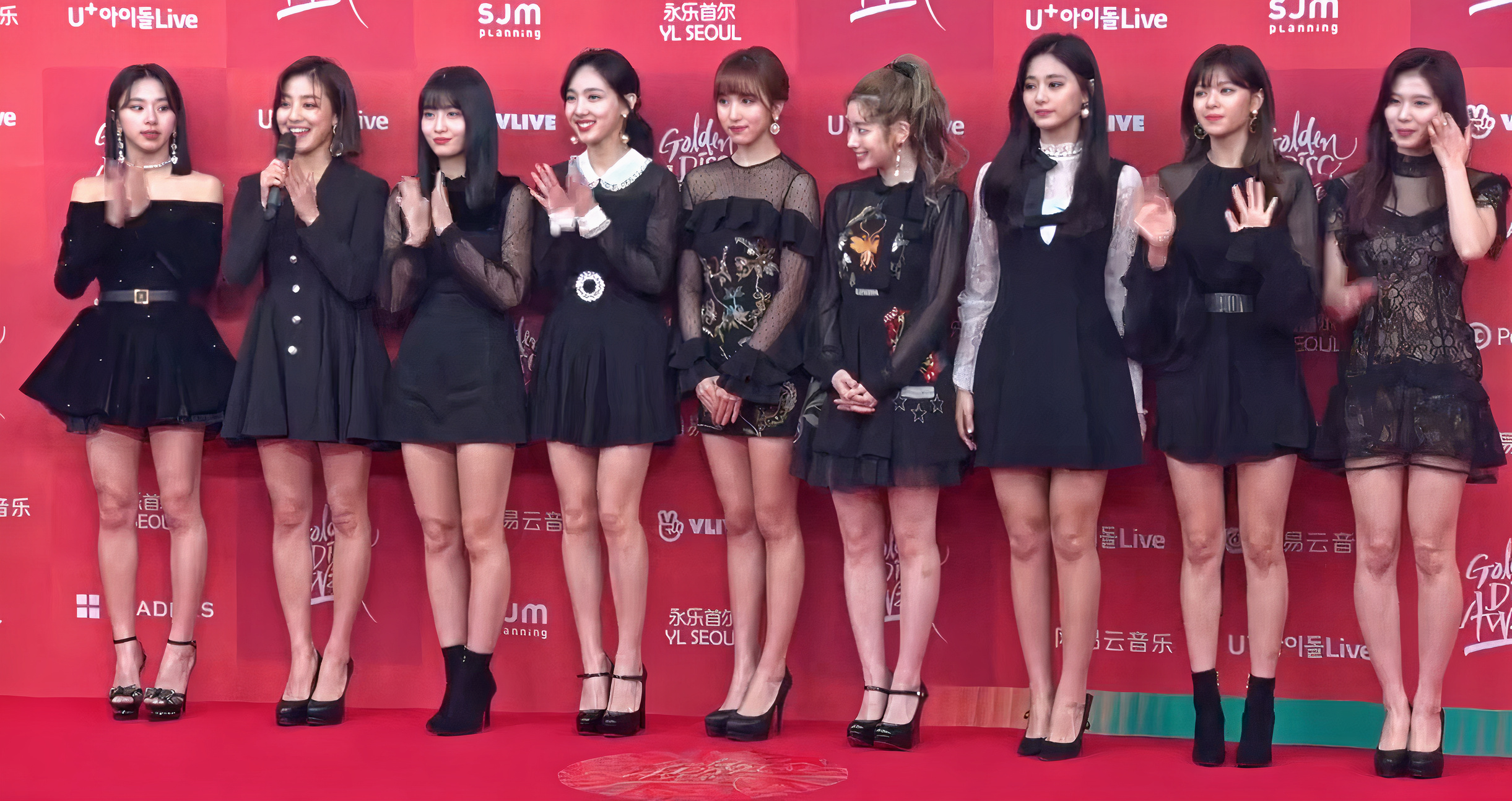
Twice

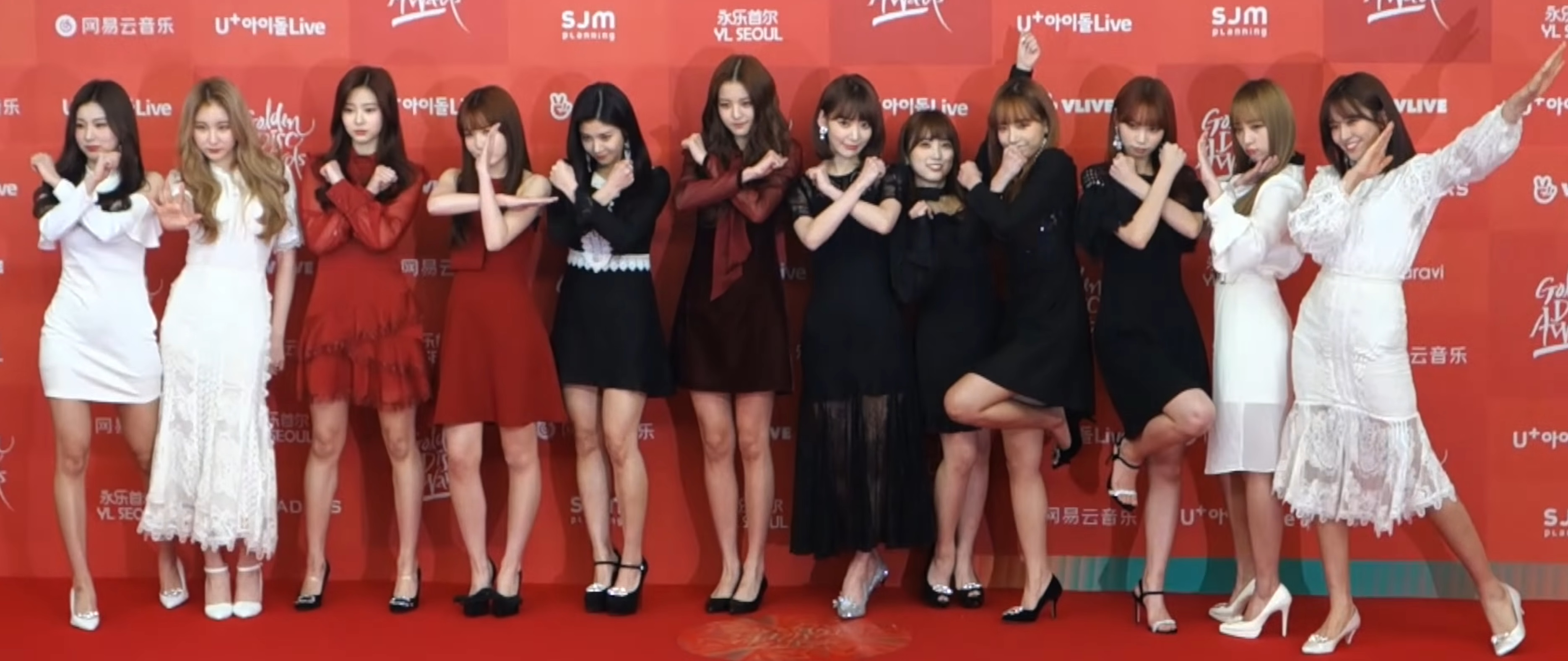
Iz*One

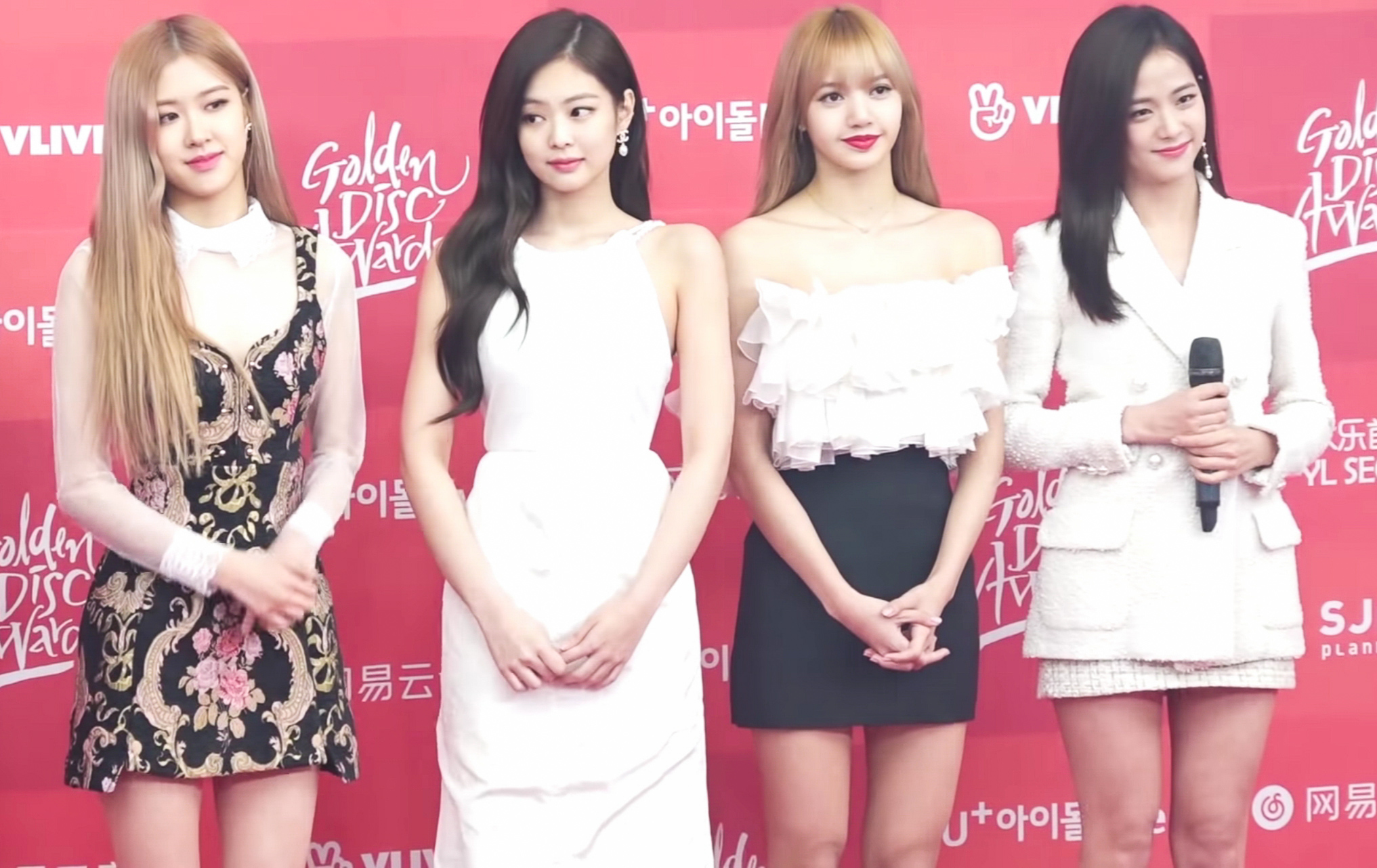
Blackpink

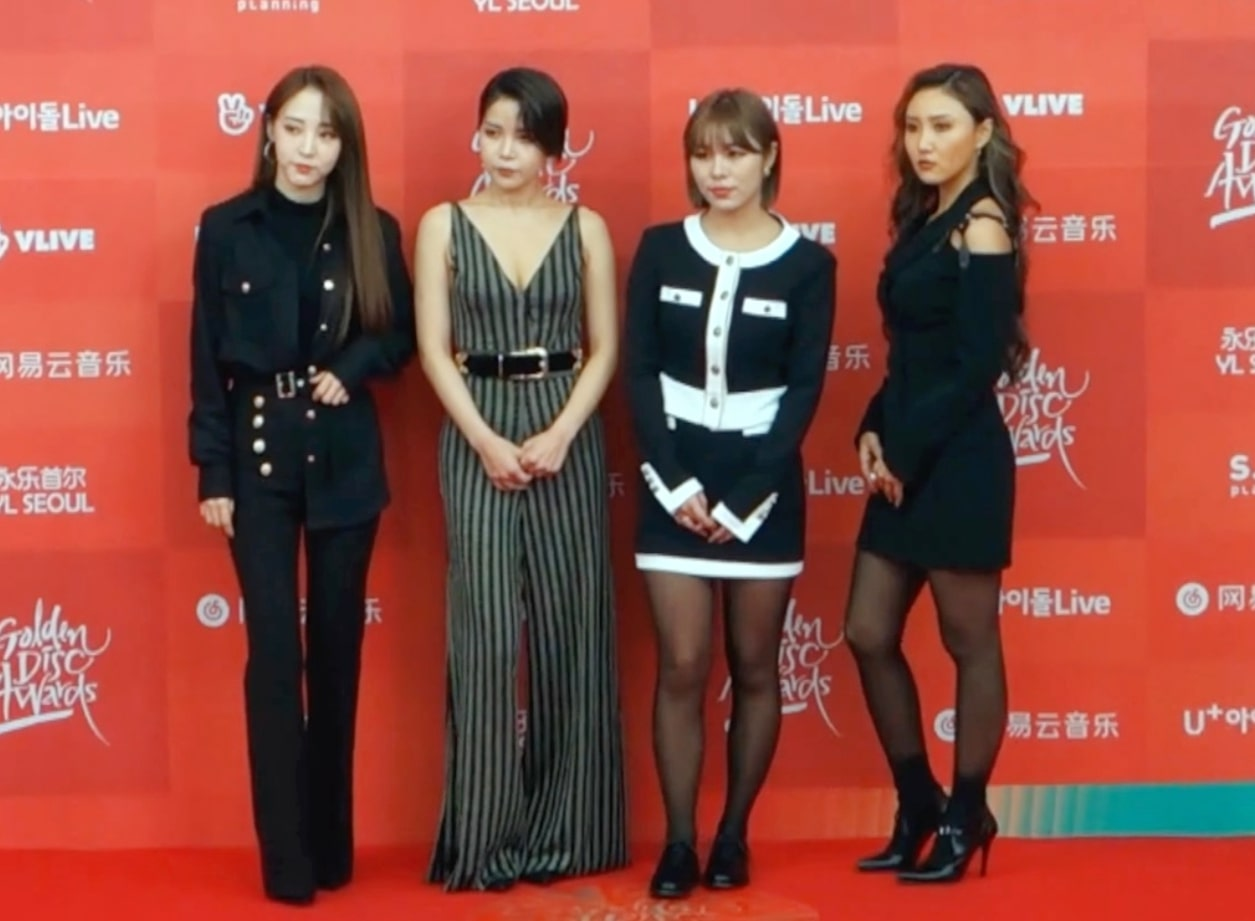
Mamamoo

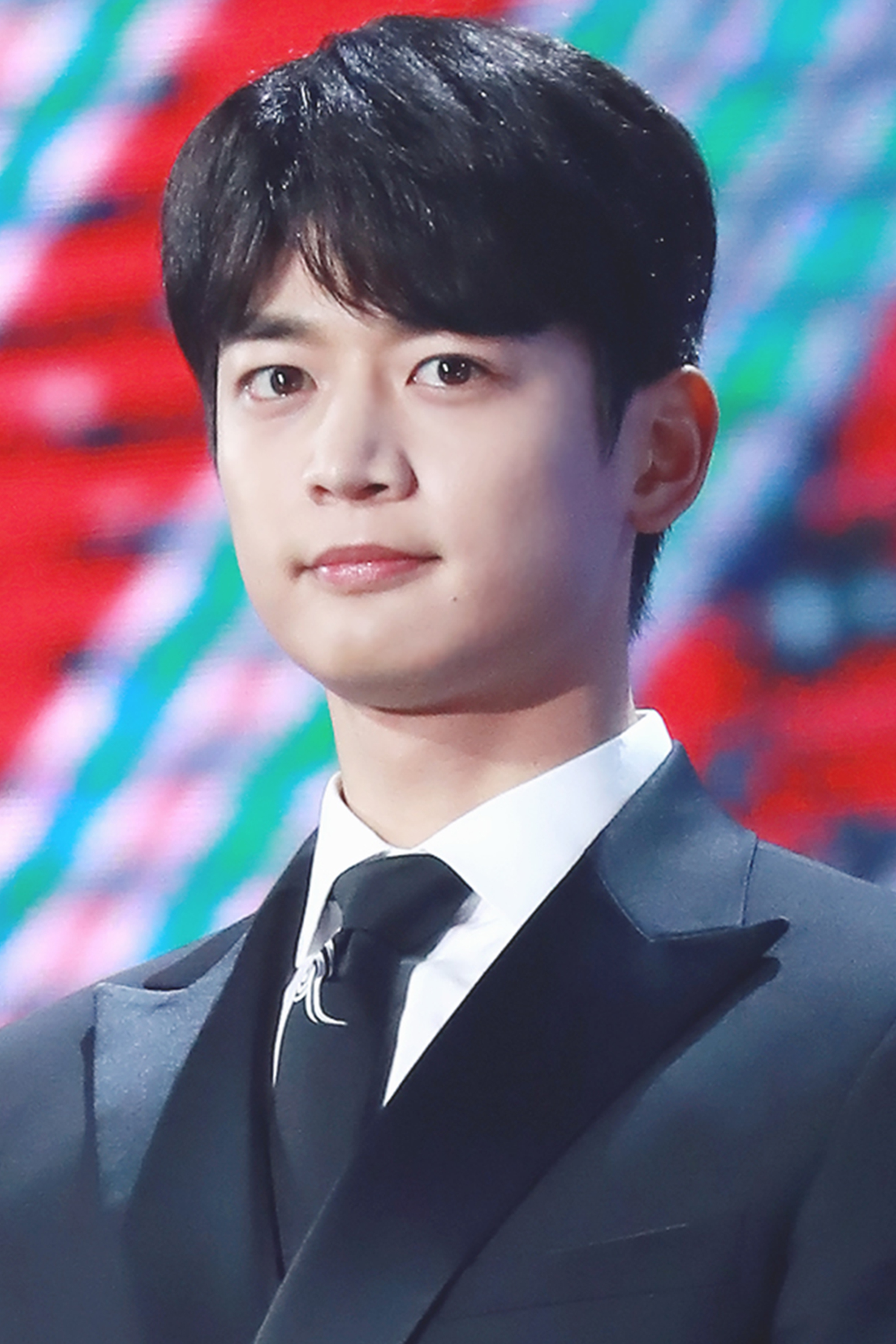
Shinee's Choi Min-ho

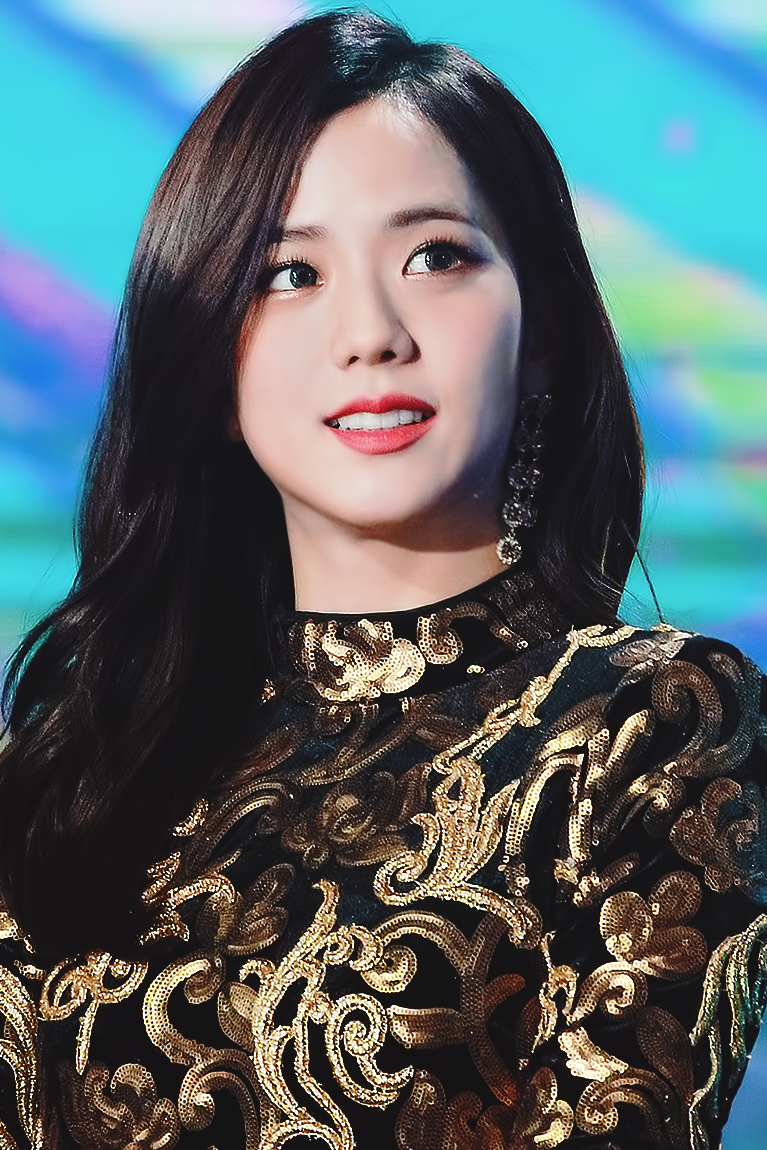
Blackpink's Jisoo

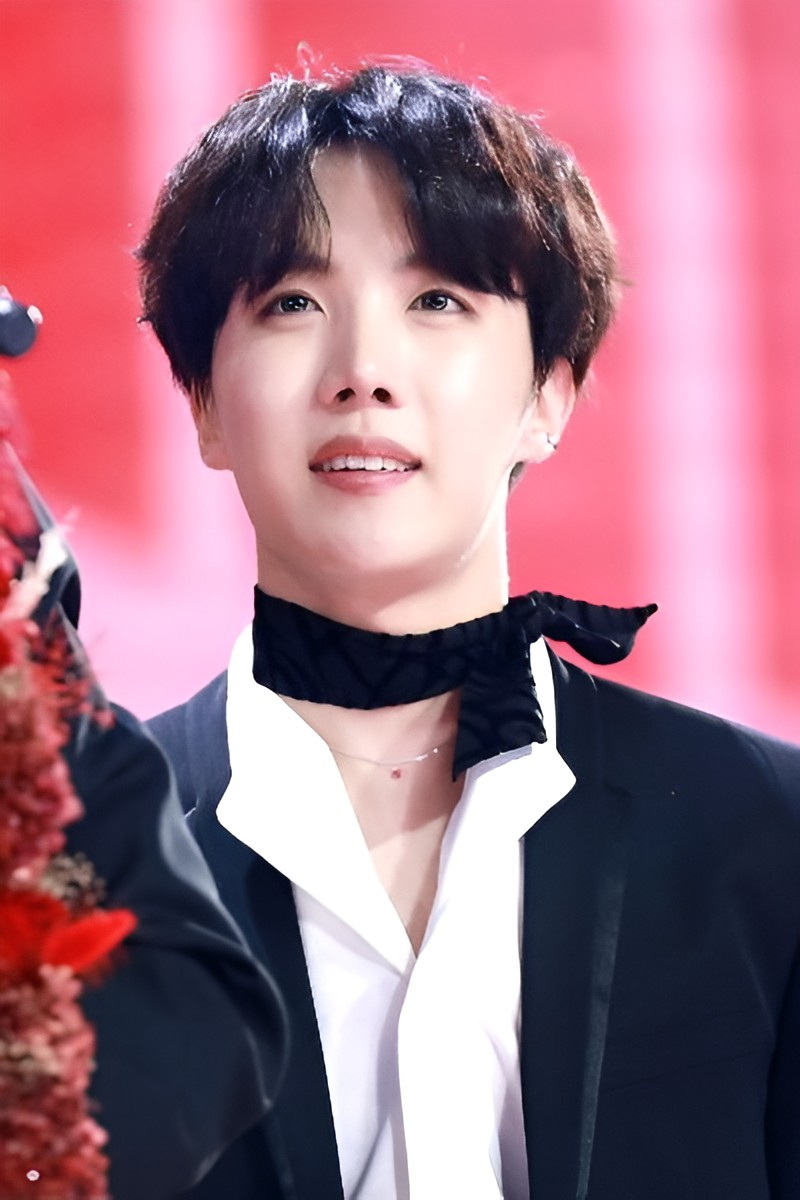
BTS's J-Hope

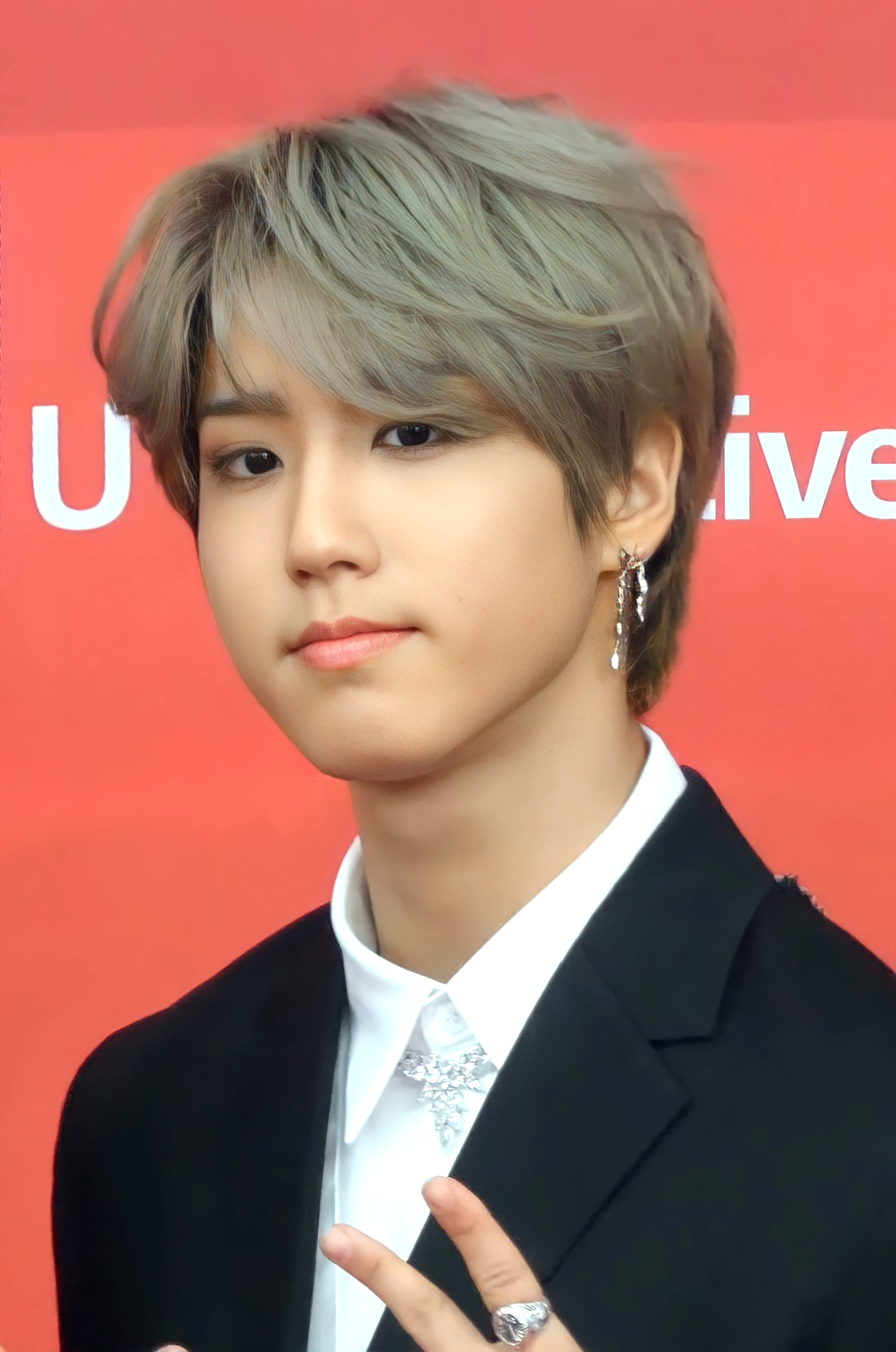
Stray Kids's Han

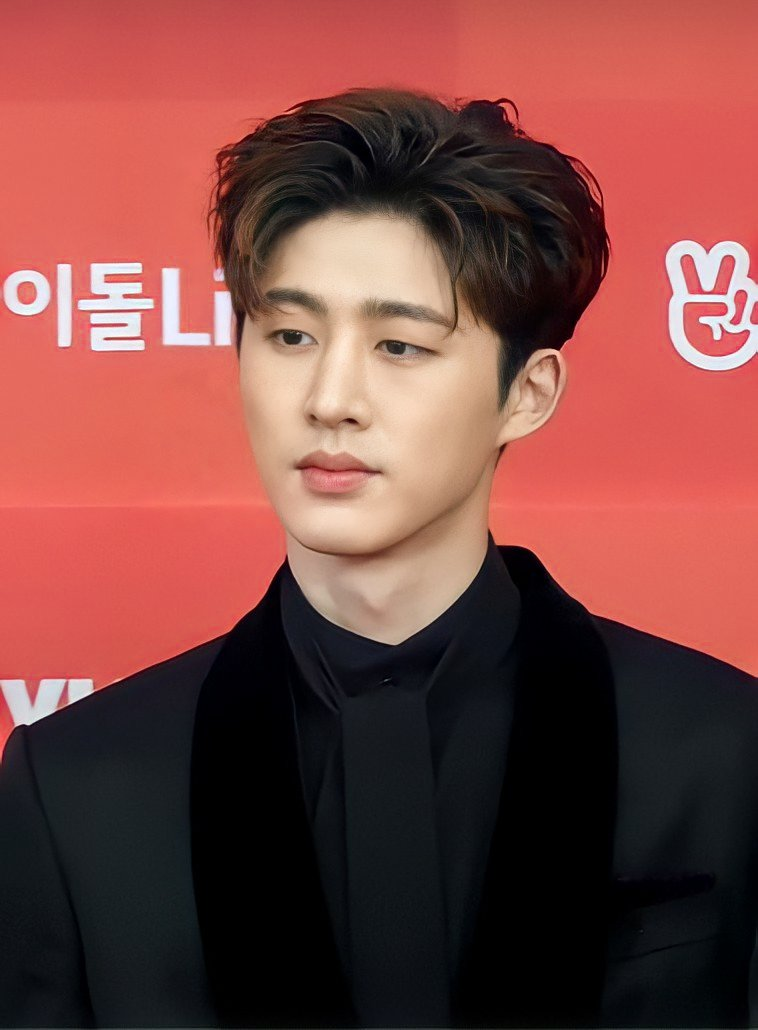
iKon's B.I

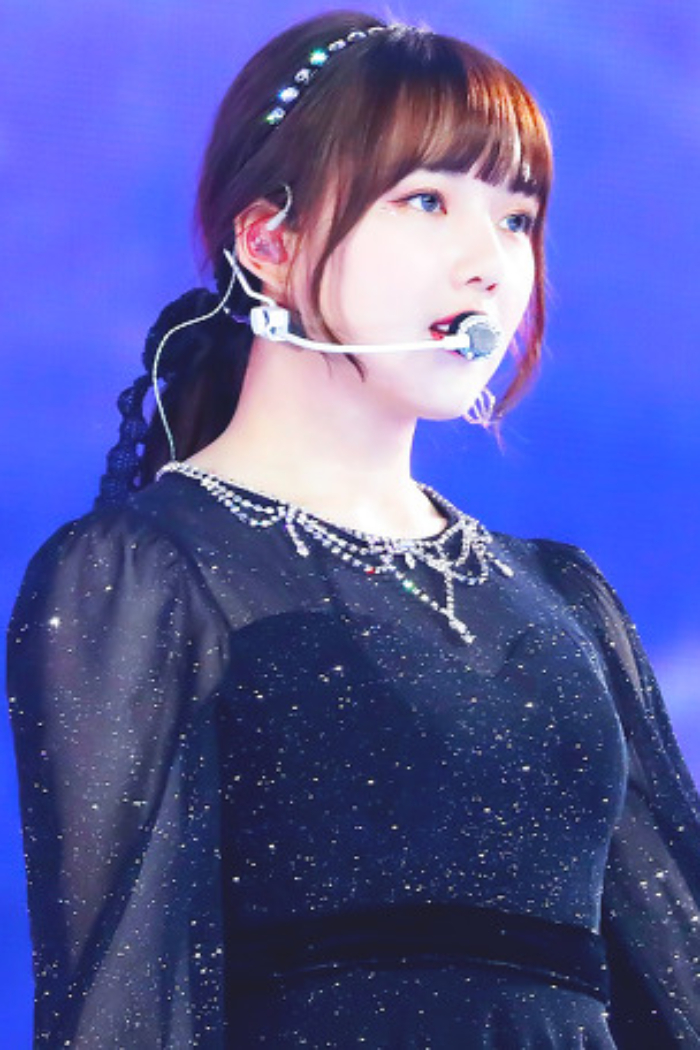
GFriend's Yerin

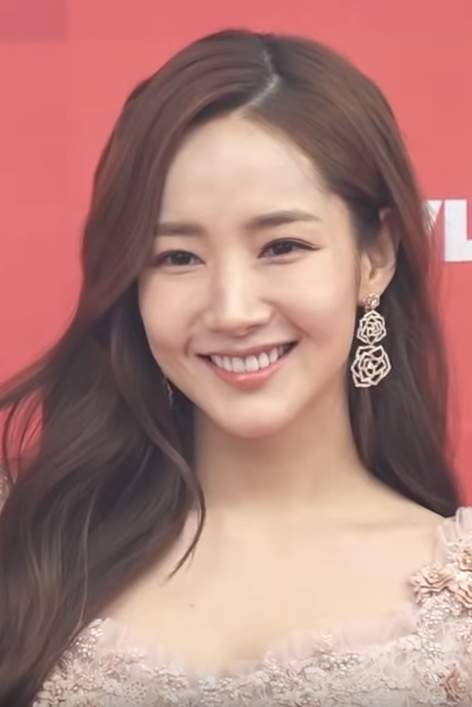
Park Min-young

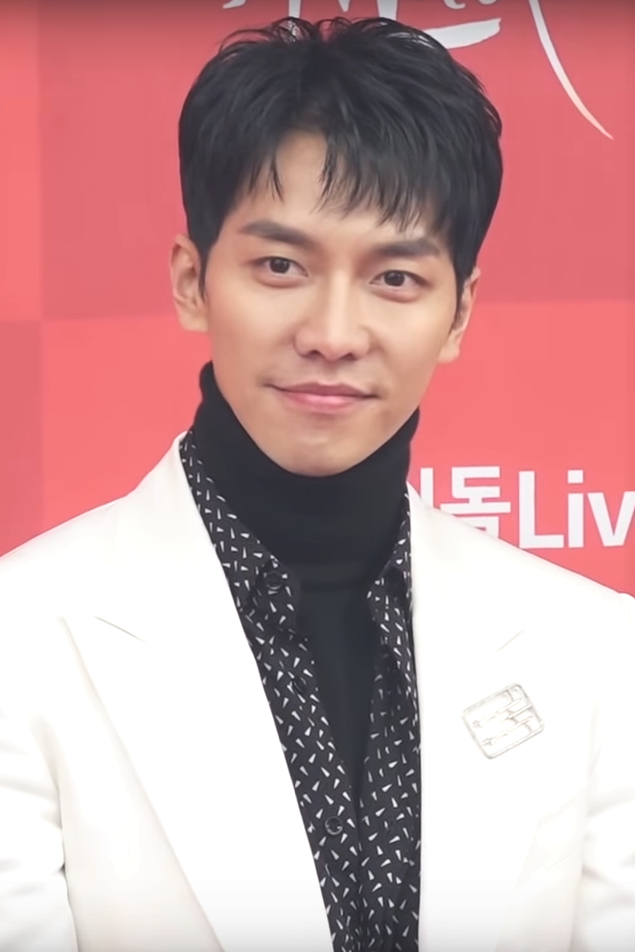
Lee Seung-gi
