= Roller Coaster (Chung Ha song) =

2018 single by Chung Ha

Single by Chung Ha

from the EP Offset
- Released: January 17, 2018
- Recorded: 2017
- Genre: K-pop; dance; alternative R&B; 2-step
- Length: 3:32
- Label: MNH Entertainment; CJ E&M Music
- Songwriters: Black Eyed Pilseung; Jeon Goon
- Producer: Black Eyed Pilseung

Chung Ha singles chronology
"LaLaLa" (2017)	"Roller Coaster" (2018)	"My Paradise" (2018)

Music video
- "Roller Coaster (MNH)" on YouTube "Roller Coaster (Stone)" on YouTube

"Roller Coaster" is a song by South Korean singer Chung Ha, serving as the lead single from her second EP, Offset. As of February 2021, the song has close to 70 million views on YouTube, and over 40 million streams on Spotify.

== Composition ==
The electropop song is the lead single of Chung Ha's Offset EP and incorporates alt-R&B and groovy strings to propel the singer's vocals. The song reflects on the emotions of a relationship, comparing the ups and downs of romance to the title "Roller Coaster" ride. Soompi described it as "a dance song that's reminiscent of '90s style music but with a modern two-step rhythm."

== Music video ==
The music video for "Roller Coaster" bounces between multiple versions of Chung Ha as a representation of the song's meaning, alternating between a wide-eyed, sweater-wearing innocent to an early 2000s-inspired dancing queen and day-glo hued club dancer.

== Accolades ==
Awards and nominations
Year	Award	Category	Result	Ref.
2018	Asia Artist Awards	AAA Favorite Award (Note: Nominated along with "Love U")	Won	
2018	Korea Popular Music Awards	Best Digital Song	Nominated	
2018	Korea Popular Music Awards	Best Solo Dance Track	Won	
2018	Mnet Asian Music Awards	Best Dance Performance – Solo	Won	
2018	Melon Music Awards	Best Dance Award (Female)	Nominated	
2019	Golden Disc Awards	Digital Daesang	Nominated	
2019	Golden Disc Awards	Digital Bonsang	Won	

== Charts ==
=== Weekly charts ===
Chart (2018)	Peak position
South Korea (Gaon)	6
South Korea (K-pop Hot 100)	6
US World Digital Songs (Billboard)	19

=== Year-end charts ===
Chart (2018)	Peak position
South Korea (Gaon)	14

== Sales and certifications ==
Streaming certifications for Roller Coaster
Region	Certification	Certified units/sales
South Korea (KMCA)	Platinum	100,000,000^{†}
^{†} Streaming-only figures based on certification alone.
