= Offset (EP) =

2018 extended play by Chung Ha

- Digital cover

EP by Chung Ha
- Released: January 17, 2018
- Recorded: 2017
- Genre: K-pop
- Length: 15:30
- Label: MNH Entertainment; CJ E&M Music

Chung Ha chronology
Hands on Me (2017)	Offset (2018)	Blooming Blue (2018)

Singles from Offset
- 1. "Roller Coaster" Released: January 17, 2018

Offset is the second extended play by South Korean singer Chung Ha. It was released by MNH Entertainment and distributed by CJ E&M Music on January 17, 2018.

== Release ==
The EP was released on January 17, 2018, through several music portals, including MelOn and iTunes.

== Commercial performance ==
Offset debuted and peaked at number 3 on the Gaon Album Chart on the week January 20, 2018. In its second week, the EP fell to number 49 and to number 55 a week later. The EP charted sixth consecutive weeks on the chart. The EP also debuted and peaked at number 13 on the US World Albums chart on the week ending January 27, 2018.

The EP was the 26th best-selling album of January 2018, with 11,102 physical copies sold and the 100th best selling-album in the first half of 2018 with 13,751 copies sold.

== Track listing ==
Digital download/CD

No.	Title	Lyrics	Music	Arrangement	Length
1.	"Offset"	Chung Ha; Vincenzo; Fuxxy; Any Masingga	Vincenzo; Fuxxy; Any Masingga	Vincenzo	1:09
2.	"Roller Coaster"	Black Eyed Pilseung; Jeon Goon	Black Eyed Pilseung; Jeon Goon	Rado	3:32
3.	"Do It"	Vincenzo; Fuxxy; Any Masingga; Emelie Sederholm	Vincenzo; Fuxxy; Any Masingga; Emelie Sederholm	Vincenzo	3:33
4.	"Bad Boy"	Vincenzo; Any Masingga; Fuxxy; Anna Timgren	Vincenzo; Any Masingga; Fuxxy; Anna Timgren	Vincenzo; Any Masingga	3:07
5.	"Remind of You" (너의 온도)	Team Columbus	Team Columbus	Team Columbus; Kim Young-ho	4:03
Total length:					15:30

== Charts ==
Chart (2018)	Peak position
South Korea (Gaon)	3
US World Albums (Billboard)	13

== Release history ==
Region	Date	Format	Label
South Korea	January 18, 2018	CD, digital download	MNH Entertainment, CJ E&M Music
Worldwide	January 18, 2018	Digital download	MNH Entertainment
