= List of awards and nominations received by Twice =

Twice awards and nominations
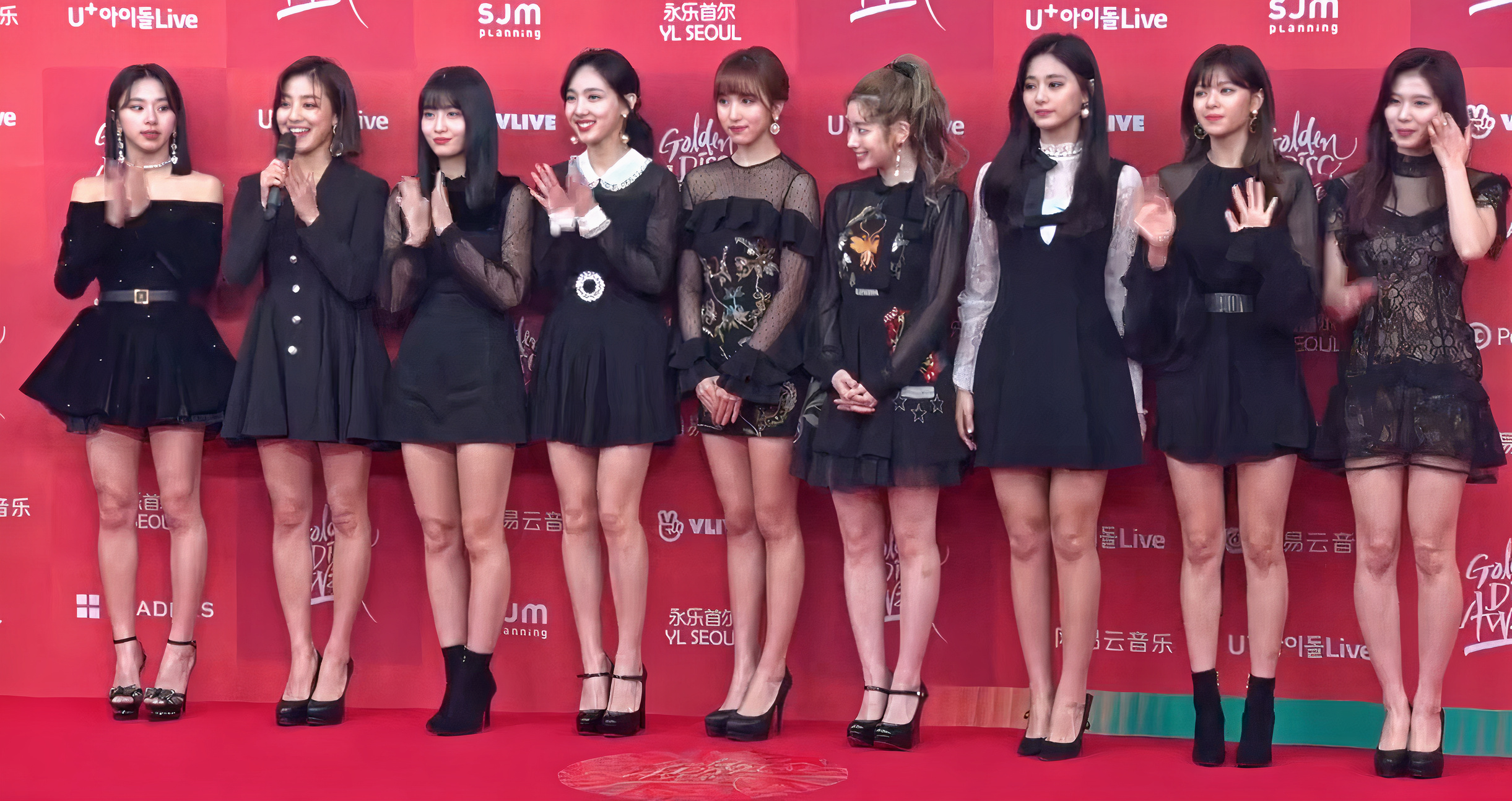
- Twice at the 33rd Golden Disc Awards in 2019
Awards and nominations
Award	Wins	Nominations
American Music Awards	1	2
APAN Music Awards	2	7
Asia Artist Awards	9	21
Asian Pop Music Awards	1	6
Billboard Music Awards	0	3
Billboard Women in Music	1	1
Brand Customer Loyalty Award	0	1
Bugs Music Awards	3	3
Circle Chart Music Awards	7	29
Edaily Culture Awards	1	1
The Fact Music Awards	4	9
Genie Music Awards	5	15
Golden Disc Awards	12	42
Hanteo Music Awards	1	7
iHeartRadio Music Awards	0	2
InStyle Star Icon	0	1
Japan Gold Disc Award	9	9
Japan Record Awards	1	2
Joox Indonesia Music Awards	0	1
Joox Thailand Music Awards	0	2
K-Global Heart Dream Awards	1	1
Korea Cable TV Association Awards	2	2
Korea PD Awards	1	1
Korea Popular Music Awards	2	6
Korean Consumer Forum Award	1	1
Korean Ministry of Culture, Sports and Tourism	1	1
Korean Music Awards	0	3
MAMA Awards	21	61
Melon Music Awards	5	24
MTV Europe Music Awards	0	3
MTV MIAW Awards	0	4
MTV Video Music Awards	0	2
Music Awards Japan	0	4
Nickelodeon Mexico Kids' Choice Awards	0	1
Philippine K-pop Awards	6	6
Seoul Music Awards	7	42
Shibuya Note Awards	0	1
Shorty Awards	1	1
Soompi Awards	1	14
Soribada Best K-Music Awards	10	13
Spotify Awards	0	1
Telehit Awards	0	1
TMElive International Music Awards	1	1
V Live Awards	6	7

Totals (Note: Certain award groups do not simply award one winner. They acknowledge several different recipients, have runners-up, and have third place. Since this is a specific recognition and is different from losing an award, runner-up mentions are considered wins in this award tally. For simplification and to avoid errors, each award in this list has been presumed to have had a prior nomination.)
- Wins: 123
- Nominations: 365

This is a list of awards and nominations received by Twice, a South Korean girl group formed by JYP Entertainment in 2015. Since their debut they have received several awards and nominations including seven Circle Chart Music Awards, twelve Golden Disc Awards, twenty-one MAMA Awards, five Melon Music Awards and seven Seoul Music Awards, as well as three MTV Europe Music Awards nominations and two MTV Video Music Awards nominations.

The group debuted in 2015 with "Like Ooh-Ahh", the lead single from the EP The Story Begins. The debut was a success and led the group to win rookie awards such as Rookie of the Year Award at the Golden Disc Awards and Best New Female Group at the 2015 Mnet Asian Music Awards. In 2016, they released "Cheer Up" to commercial success being their first of nine consecutive number-one singles at the Circle Digital Chart. The song won both Digital Bonsang and Digital Daesang at the 2017 Golden Disc Awards and Song of the Year at the 2016 Melon Music Awards. It also won Song of the Year at the 2016 Mnet Asian Music Awards, an award they would win the following two years (for "Signal" in 2017 and "What Is Love?" in 2018), being the act with most wins in the category tied with BTS with three wins. "Cheer Up" also gave the group their first win for the MAMA Award for Best Female Group.

In 2017 they released their debut studio album Twicetagram, which won Album Bonsang at the 32nd Golden Disc Awards, as well as four singles including "Knock Knock" and "Signal", which won Best Dance – Female at the 2017 Melon Music Awards and Best Dance Performance (Female Group) at the 2017 Mnet Asian Music Awards, respectively. Also in 2017, the group received a commendation awarded at the Korean Popular Culture and Arts Awards, hosted by the South Korean Ministry of Culture, Sports and Tourism, given to recognize individuals or groups for their contribution to popular culture in South Korea and abroad. In 2018, they released the successful singles "What Is Love?", "Dance the Night Away" and "Yes or Yes". At the 2018 Mnet Asian Music Awards, they won five awards including their second win for Best Female Group, while at the 2016 Gaon Chart Music Awards, "What Is Love?" won Song of the Year – April and "Dance the Night Away" won Song of the Year – July.

In 2019 they released the singles "Fancy" and "Feel Special", the latter was their first number-one at the World Digital Songs chart. At the 2019 Mnet Asian Music Awards, "Fancy" won their third MAMA Award for Best Dance Performance (Female Group) while the EP Fancy You was nominated for Album of the Year. Their second studio album Eyes Wide Open was released in 2020. The same year they released the EP More & More which won Album Bonsang at the 35th Golden Disc Awards. The following year the single "Alcohol-Free" was released, the song was nominated for the MTV Video Music Award for Best K-Pop, being their first MTV VMA nomination. At the 2021 Mnet Asian Music Awards, the group won Best Female Group for the fourth time, being the girl group with most wins in the category. Their third studio album Formula of Love: O+T=＜3 was released in 2021, its lead single "Scientist" won Artist of the Year – Digital Music (November) at the 11th Gaon Chart Music Awards.

== Awards and nominations ==
Name of the award ceremony, year presented, category, nominee of the award, and the result of the nomination
Award ceremony	Year	Category	Nominee / work	Result	Ref.
American Music Awards	2022	Favorite K-Pop Artist	Twice	Nominated	
American Music Awards	2026	Best Female K-Pop Artist	Twice	Won	
APAN Music Awards	2021	APAN Top 10 (Bonsang)	Twice	Won	
APAN Music Awards	2021	Represent Record of the Year	Twice	Won	
APAN Music Awards	2021	Best Music Video	Twice	Nominated	
APAN Music Awards	2021	Best Performance	Twice	Nominated	
APAN Music Awards	2021	Idol Champ Global Pick – Group	Twice	Nominated	
APAN Music Awards	2021	Idol Champ Fan's Pick – Group	Twice	Nominated	
APAN Music Awards	2021	KT Seezn Star Award – Singer	Twice	Nominated	
Asia Artist Awards	2016	Popularity Award – Singer	Twice	Nominated	
Asia Artist Awards	2016	Best Artist Award – Singer	Twice	Won	
Asia Artist Awards	2017	Popularity Award – Singer	Twice	Nominated	
Asia Artist Awards	2018	Fabulous Award – Singer	Twice	Won	
Asia Artist Awards	2018	Popularity Award – Singer	Twice	Nominated	
Asia Artist Awards	2018	Artist of the Year – Music	Twice	Won	
Asia Artist Awards	2018	Best Artist Award – Singer	Twice	Won	
Asia Artist Awards	2019	Artist of the Year (Daesang)	Twice	Won	
Asia Artist Awards	2019	Best Social Artist Award – Music	Twice	Won	
Asia Artist Awards	2019	Popularity Award – Singer	Twice	Nominated	
Asia Artist Awards	2019	StarNews Popularity Award – Singer (Female)	Twice	Nominated	
Asia Artist Awards	2020	Popularity Award – Singer (Female)	Twice	Won	
Asia Artist Awards	2020	Artist of the Year (Daesang)	Twice	Won	
Asia Artist Awards	2021	RET Popularity Award – Singer (Female)	Twice	Won	
Asia Artist Awards	2021	U+Idol Live Popularity Award – Singer (Female)	Twice	Nominated	
Asia Artist Awards	2022	DCM Popularity Award – Female Singer	Twice	Nominated	
Asia Artist Awards	2022	Idolplus Popularity Award – Singer	Twice	Nominated	
Asia Artist Awards	2023	Popularity Award – Singer (Female)	Twice	Nominated	
Asia Artist Awards	2024	Popularity Award – Singer (Female)	Twice	Nominated	
Asia Artist Awards	2025	Popularity Award – Group (Female)	Twice	Nominated	
Asia Artist Awards	2026	Popularity Award – Group (Female)	Twice	Pending	
Asian Pop Music Awards (Note: Hosted by the Hong Kong Asia Pacific International Group and Sunway Records, the Asian Pop Music Awards bases its winners on the Asian Pop Music Chart which opened in September 2019.)	2020	Best Group (Overseas)	More & More	Nominated	
Asian Pop Music Awards	2021	Best Group (Overseas)	Taste of Love	Nominated	
Asian Pop Music Awards	2022	Best Group (Overseas)	Between 1&2	Nominated	
Asian Pop Music Awards	2022	Best Album of the Year (Overseas)	Between 1&2	Nominated	
Asian Pop Music Awards	2023	Top 20 Songs of the Year (Overseas)	"Set Me Free"	Won	
Asian Pop Music Awards	2023	Song of the Year (Overseas)	"Set Me Free"	Nominated	
Billboard Music Awards	2023	Top Global K-Pop Artist	Twice	Nominated	
Billboard Music Awards	2023	Top K-Pop Album	Ready to Be	Nominated	
Billboard Music Awards	2023	Top K-Pop Touring Artist	Twice	Nominated	
Billboard Women in Music	2023	Breakthrough Award	Twice	Won	
Brand Customer Loyalty Award	2021	Best Female Idol Group	Twice	Nominated	
Bugs Music Awards	2020	20th Anniversary Awards – Most Loved Music	"Cheer Up"	Won	
Bugs Music Awards	2020	20th Anniversary Awards – Most Loved Music	"TT"	Won	
Bugs Music Awards	2020	20th Anniversary Awards – Most Loved Artists	Twice	Won	
Circle Chart Music Awards	2016	New Artist of the Year	Twice	Nominated	
Circle Chart Music Awards	2017	Artist of the Year – Physical Album (2nd Quarter)	Page Two	Nominated	
Circle Chart Music Awards	2017	Artist of the Year – Digital Music (April)	"Cheer Up"	Won	
Circle Chart Music Awards	2017	Artist of the Year – Digital Music (October)	"TT"	Won	
Circle Chart Music Awards	2018	Artist of the Year – Physical Album (1st Quarter)	Twicecoaster: Lane 2	Nominated	
Circle Chart Music Awards	2018	Artist of the Year – Physical Album (2nd Quarter)	Signal	Nominated	
Circle Chart Music Awards	2018	Artist of the Year – Physical Album (4th Quarter)	Twicetagram	Nominated	
Circle Chart Music Awards	2018	Artist of the Year – Digital Music (February)	"Knock Knock"	Won	
Circle Chart Music Awards	2018	Artist of the Year – Digital Music (May)	"Signal"	Nominated	
Circle Chart Music Awards	2018	Artist of the Year – Digital Music (October)	"Likey"	Nominated	
Circle Chart Music Awards	2018	Artist of the Year – Digital Music (December)	"Heart Shaker"	Won	
Circle Chart Music Awards	2019	Artist of the Year – Physical Album (2nd Quarter)	What Is Love?	Nominated	
Circle Chart Music Awards	2019	Artist of the Year – Physical Album (3rd Quarter)	Summer Nights	Nominated	
Circle Chart Music Awards	2019	Artist of the Year – Physical Album (4th Quarter)	Yes or Yes	Nominated	
Circle Chart Music Awards	2019	Artist of the Year – Digital Music (April)	"What Is Love?"	Won	
Circle Chart Music Awards	2019	Artist of the Year – Digital Music (July)	"Dance the Night Away"	Won	
Circle Chart Music Awards	2019	Artist of the Year – Digital Music (November)	"Yes or Yes"	Nominated	
Circle Chart Music Awards	2020	Artist of the Year – Physical Album (2nd Quarter)	Fancy You	Nominated	
Circle Chart Music Awards	2020	Artist of the Year – Physical Album (3rd Quarter)	Feel Special	Nominated	
Circle Chart Music Awards	2020	Artist of the Year – Digital Music (April)	"Fancy"	Nominated	
Circle Chart Music Awards	2021	Artist of the Year – Physical Album (3rd Quarter)	More & More	Nominated	
Circle Chart Music Awards	2021	Artist of the Year – Digital Music (June)	"More & More"	Nominated	
Circle Chart Music Awards	2021	Mubeat Global Choice Award – Female	Twice	Nominated	
Circle Chart Music Awards	2022	Artist of the Year – Digital Music (June)	"Alcohol-Free"	Nominated	
Circle Chart Music Awards	2022	Artist of the Year – Digital Music (November)	"Scientist"	Won	
Circle Chart Music Awards	2022	Mubeat Global Choice Award – Female	Twice	Nominated	
Circle Chart Music Awards	2023	Artist of the Year – Global Digital Music (August)	"Talk That Talk"	Nominated	
Circle Chart Music Awards	2023	Mubeat Global Choice Award – Female	Twice	Nominated	
Circle Chart Music Awards	2024	Mubeat Global Choice Award – Female	Twice	Nominated	
Edaily Culture Awards (Note: The Edaily Culture Awards are a South Korean award ceremony established in 2013 to honor the year's best achievements in six categories: theatre, classical, dance, Korean music, musicals and concerts. Winners are selected by a panel of 54 judges who are professionals in each field.)	2021	Best Concert Award	Twice: World in a Day	Won	
The Fact Music Awards	2018	Artist of the Year (Bonsang)	Twice	Won	
The Fact Music Awards	2018	Worldwide Icon	Twice	Won	
The Fact Music Awards	2019	Artist of the Year (Bonsang)	Twice	Won	
The Fact Music Awards	2019	Worldwide Icon	Twice	Nominated	
The Fact Music Awards	2020	Artist of the Year (Bonsang)	Twice	Won	
The Fact Music Awards	2020	TMA Popularity Award	Twice	Nominated	
The Fact Music Awards	2021	Fan N Star Choice Artist	Twice	Nominated	
The Fact Music Awards	2023	Best Music – Spring	"Set Me Free"	Nominated	
The Fact Music Awards	2023	Idolplus Popularity Award	Twice	Nominated	
Genie Music Awards	2018	The Top Artist	Twice	Nominated	
Genie Music Awards	2018	The Best Selling Artist	Twice	Won	
Genie Music Awards	2018	The Female Group	Twice	Won	
Genie Music Awards	2018	Best Global Performance	Twice	Won	
Genie Music Awards	2018	Genie Music Popularity Award	Twice	Nominated	
Genie Music Awards	2018	The Top Music	"What Is Love?"	Nominated	
Genie Music Awards	2018	The Performing Artist – Female	"What Is Love?"	Nominated	
Genie Music Awards	2019	The Top Artist	Twice	Nominated	
Genie Music Awards	2019	The Best Selling Artist	Twice	Won	
Genie Music Awards	2019	The Female Group	Twice	Won	
Genie Music Awards	2019	The Performing Artist – Female	Twice	Nominated	
Genie Music Awards	2019	Genie Music Popularity Award	Twice	Nominated	
Genie Music Awards	2019	Global Popularity Award	Twice	Nominated	
Genie Music Awards	2020	Artist of the Year	Twice	Nominated	
Genie Music Awards	2022	Best Female Performance Award	Twice	Nominated	
Golden Disc Awards	2016	Rookie of the Year Award	Twice	Won	
Golden Disc Awards	2016	Popularity Award	Twice	Nominated	
Golden Disc Awards	2016	Global Popularity Award	Twice	Nominated	
Golden Disc Awards	2017	Song of the Year (Daesang)	"Cheer Up"	Won	
Golden Disc Awards	2017	Best Digital Song (Bonsang)	"Cheer Up"	Won	
Golden Disc Awards	2017	Best Album (Bonsang)	Twicecoaster: Lane 1	Nominated	
Golden Disc Awards	2017	Popularity Award	Twice	Nominated	
Golden Disc Awards	2017	Asian Choice Popularity Award	Twice	Nominated	
Golden Disc Awards	2018	Best Album (Bonsang)	Twicetagram	Won	
Golden Disc Awards	2018	Best Digital Song (Bonsang)	"Knock Knock"	Won	
Golden Disc Awards	2018	CeCi Asia Icon Award	Twice	Won	
Golden Disc Awards	2018	Album of the Year (Daesang)	Twicetagram	Nominated	
Golden Disc Awards	2018	Song of the Year (Daesang)	"Knock Knock"	Nominated	
Golden Disc Awards	2018	Genie Popularity Award	Twice	Nominated	
Golden Disc Awards	2018	Global Popularity Award	Twice	Nominated	
Golden Disc Awards	2019	Best Album (Bonsang)	What Is Love?	Won	
Golden Disc Awards	2019	Best Digital Song (Bonsang)	"Heart Shaker"	Won	
Golden Disc Awards	2019	Album of the Year (Daesang)	What Is Love?	Nominated	
Golden Disc Awards	2019	Song of the Year (Daesang)	"Heart Shaker"	Nominated	
Golden Disc Awards	2019	Popularity Award	Twice	Nominated	
Golden Disc Awards	2019	NetEase Music Global Star Popularity Award	Twice	Nominated	
Golden Disc Awards	2020	Best Album (Bonsang)	Feel Special	Won	
Golden Disc Awards	2020	Best Digital Song (Bonsang)	"Yes or Yes"	Won	
Golden Disc Awards	2020	Cosmopolitan Artist Award	Twice	Won	
Golden Disc Awards	2020	Album of the Year (Daesang)	Feel Special	Nominated	
Golden Disc Awards	2020	Song of the Year (Daesang)	"Yes or Yes"	Nominated	
Golden Disc Awards	2020	NetEase Music Fans' Choice K-pop Star Award	Twice	Nominated	
Golden Disc Awards	2020	Popularity Award	Twice	Nominated	
Golden Disc Awards	2021	Best Album (Bonsang)	More & More	Won	
Golden Disc Awards	2021	Album of the Year (Daesang)	More & More	Nominated	
Golden Disc Awards	2021	Popularity Award	Twice	Nominated	
Golden Disc Awards	2021	QQ Music Fan's Choice K-Pop Artist	Twice	Nominated	
Golden Disc Awards	2022	Best Album (Bonsang)	Taste of Love	Nominated	
Golden Disc Awards	2022	Best Digital Song (Bonsang)	"Alcohol-Free"	Nominated	
Golden Disc Awards	2022	Seezn Most Popular Artist Award	Twice	Nominated	
Golden Disc Awards	2023	Best Album (Bonsang)	Between 1&2	Nominated	
Golden Disc Awards	2023	Popularity Award	Twice	Nominated	
Golden Disc Awards	2024	Best Album (Bonsang)	Ready to Be	Nominated	
Golden Disc Awards	2024	Female Popularity Award	Twice	Nominated	
Golden Disc Awards	2025	Best Album (Bonsang)	With You-th	Nominated	
Golden Disc Awards	2026	Best Album (Bonsang)	Strategy	Nominated	
Golden Disc Awards	2026	Most Popular Artist – Female	Twice	Nominated	
Hanteo Music Awards	2021	Artist Award – Female Group	Twice	Won	
Hanteo Music Awards	2021	WhosFandom Award	Twice	Nominated	
Hanteo Music Awards	2023	Artist of the Year (Bonsang)	Twice	Nominated	
Hanteo Music Awards	2023	Global Artist Award	Twice	Nominated	
Hanteo Music Awards	2023	WhosFandom Award	Twice	Nominated	
Hanteo Music Awards	2024	Artist of the Year (Bonsang)	Twice	Nominated	
Hanteo Music Awards	2024	WhosFandom Award	Twice	Nominated	
iHeartRadio Music Awards	2026	K-pop Group of the Year	Twice	Nominated	
iHeartRadio Music Awards	2026	Favorite K-pop Collab	"We Pray" (Twice version) (Coldplay featuring Twice, Little Simz, Burna Boy, Elyanna and Tini)	Nominated	
InStyle Star Icon	2016	Next Generation Girl Group	Twice	Nominated	
Japan Gold Disc Awards	2018	New Artist of the Year (Asia)	Twice	Won	
Japan Gold Disc Awards	2018	Best 3 New Artist (Asia)	Twice	Won	
Japan Gold Disc Awards	2018	Album of the Year (Asia)	#Twice	Won	
Japan Gold Disc Awards	2018	Best 3 Albums (Asia)	#Twice	Won	
Japan Gold Disc Awards	2018	Song of the Year by Download (Asia)	"TT (Japanese ver.)"	Won	
Japan Gold Disc Awards	2019	Best 3 Albums (Asia)	BDZ	Won	
Japan Gold Disc Awards	2019	Song of the Year by Download (Asia)	"Candy Pop"	Won	
Japan Gold Disc Awards	2020	Best 3 Albums (Asia)	&Twice and #Twice2	Won	
Japan Gold Disc Awards	2020	Album of the Year (Asia)	#Twice2	Won	
Japan Record Awards	2018	Grand Prix	"Wake Me Up"	Nominated	
Japan Record Awards	2018	Best Song Award	"Wake Me Up"	Won	
Joox Indonesia Music Awards	2021	Best Fanbase of the Year	Twice	Nominated	
Joox Thailand Music Awards	2022	Korean Song of the Year	"Alcohol-Free"	Nominated	
Joox Thailand Music Awards	2022	Top Social Global Artist of the Year	Twice	Nominated	
K-Global Heart Dream Awards	2023	Favorite Idol Girl Group Popularity Award	Twice	Won	
Korea Cable TV Association Awards	2016	Best Singer Award	Twice	Won	
Korea Cable TV Association Awards	2017	Artist of the Year	Twice	Won	
Korea PD Awards	2017	Performer of the Year (Daesang)	Twice	Won	
Korea Popular Music Awards	2018	Best Album	Merry & Happy	Nominated	
Korea Popular Music Awards	2018	Best Artist	Twice	Nominated	
Korea Popular Music Awards	2018	Bonsang Award	Twice	Won	
Korea Popular Music Awards	2018	Popularity Award	Twice	Nominated	
Korea Popular Music Awards	2018	Best Digital Song	"Heart Shaker"	Won	
Korea Popular Music Awards	2018	Group Dance Award	"Heart Shaker"	Nominated	
Korean Consumer Forum Award	2016	Korea's Brand of the Year	Twice	Won	
Korean Ministry of Culture, Sports and Tourism	2019	Hallyu Culture Grand Prize	Twice	Won	
Korean Music Awards	2017	Song of the Year	"Cheer Up"	Nominated	
Korean Music Awards	2017	Best Pop Song	"Cheer Up"	Nominated	
Korean Music Awards	2017	Rookie of the Year	Twice	Nominated	
MAMA Awards	2015	Best New Female Artist	Twice	Won	
MAMA Awards	2015	Artist of the Year	Twice	Nominated	
MAMA Awards	2016	Best Female Group	Twice	Won	
MAMA Awards	2016	Song of the Year	"Cheer Up"	Won	
MAMA Awards	2016	Album of the Year	Page Two	Nominated	
MAMA Awards	2016	Artist of the Year	Twice	Nominated	
MAMA Awards	2016	Best Dance Performance – Female Group	"Cheer Up"	Nominated	
MAMA Awards	2016	Worldwide Favorite Artist	Twice	Nominated	
MAMA Awards	2017	Best Dance Performance – Female Group	"Signal"	Won	
MAMA Awards	2017	Song of the Year	"Signal"	Won	
MAMA Awards	2017	Album of the Year	Signal	Nominated	
MAMA Awards	2017	Artist of the Year	Twice	Nominated	
MAMA Awards	2017	Best Female Group	Twice	Nominated	
MAMA Awards	2017	Best Music Video	"Signal"	Nominated	
MAMA Awards	2017	2017 Favorite KPOP Star	Twice	Nominated	
MAMA Awards	2018	Best Dance Performance – Female Group	"What Is Love?"	Won	
MAMA Awards	2018	Best Female Group	Twice	Won	
MAMA Awards	2018	Favorite Dance Artist – Female	Twice	Won	
MAMA Awards	2018	Song of the Year	"What Is Love?"	Won	
MAMA Awards	2018	Worldwide Fans' Choice Top 10	Twice	Won	
MAMA Awards	2018	Album of the Year	What Is Love?	Nominated	
MAMA Awards	2018	Artist of the Year	Twice	Nominated	
MAMA Awards	2018	Best Music Video	"What Is Love?"	Nominated	
MAMA Awards	2018	Favorite Music Video	"What Is Love?"	Nominated	
MAMA Awards	2018	Worldwide Icon of the Year	Twice	Nominated	
MAMA Awards	2019	Best Dance Performance – Female Group	"Fancy"	Won	
MAMA Awards	2019	Best Female Group	Twice	Won	
MAMA Awards	2019	Worldwide Fans' Choice Top 10	Twice	Won	
MAMA Awards	2019	2019 Qoo10 Favorite Female Artist	Twice	Won	
MAMA Awards	2019	Album of the Year	Fancy You	Nominated	
MAMA Awards	2019	Artist of the Year	Twice	Nominated	
MAMA Awards	2019	Song of the Year	"Fancy"	Nominated	
MAMA Awards	2019	Worldwide Icon of the Year	Twice	Nominated	
MAMA Awards	2020	Most Popular Artist	Twice	Won	
MAMA Awards	2020	Worldwide Fans' Choice Top 10	Twice	Won	
MAMA Awards	2020	Artist of the Year	Twice	Nominated	
MAMA Awards	2020	Best Dance Performance – Female Group	"More & More"	Nominated	
MAMA Awards	2020	Best Female Group	Twice	Nominated	
MAMA Awards	2020	Song of the Year	"More & More"	Nominated	
MAMA Awards	2020	Worldwide Icon of the Year	Twice	Nominated	
MAMA Awards	2021	Best Female Group	Twice	Won	
MAMA Awards	2021	Worldwide Fans' Choice Top 10	Twice	Won	
MAMA Awards	2021	Artist of the Year	Twice	Nominated	
MAMA Awards	2021	Best Dance Performance – Female Group	"Alcohol-Free"	Nominated	
MAMA Awards	2021	Song of the Year	"Alcohol-Free"	Nominated	
MAMA Awards	2021	Worldwide Icon of the Year	Twice	Nominated	
MAMA Awards	2022	Artist of the Year	Twice	Nominated	
MAMA Awards	2022	Best Female Group	Twice	Nominated	
MAMA Awards	2022	Worldwide Fans' Choice Top 10	Twice	Nominated	
MAMA Awards	2023	Worldwide Fans' Choice Top 10	Twice	Won	
MAMA Awards	2023	Album of the Year	Ready to Be	Nominated	
MAMA Awards	2023	Artist of the Year	Twice	Nominated	
MAMA Awards	2023	Best Female Group	Twice	Nominated	
MAMA Awards	2023	Worldwide Icon of the Year	Twice	Nominated	
MAMA Awards	2024	Fans' Choice Female Top 10	Twice	Won	
MAMA Awards	2024	Album of the Year	With You-th	Nominated	
MAMA Awards	2024	Artist of the Year	Twice	Nominated	
MAMA Awards	2024	Best Female Group	Twice	Nominated	
MAMA Awards	2025	Fans' Choice Female Top 10	Twice	Won	
MAMA Awards	2025	Artist of the Year	Twice	Nominated	
MAMA Awards	2025	Best Female Group	Twice	Nominated	
Melon Music Awards	2016	Album of the Year	Page Two	Nominated	
Melon Music Awards	2016	Song of the Year	"Cheer Up"	Won	
Melon Music Awards	2016	Best Dance – Female	"Cheer Up"	Nominated	
Melon Music Awards	2016	Artist of the Year	Twice	Nominated	
Melon Music Awards	2016	Top 10 Artists	Twice	Won	
Melon Music Awards	2016	Netizen Popularity Award	Twice	Nominated	
Melon Music Awards	2016	Kakao Hot Star Award	Twice	Nominated	
Melon Music Awards	2017	Song of the Year	"Knock Knock"	Nominated	
Melon Music Awards	2017	Best Dance – Female	"Knock Knock"	Won	
Melon Music Awards	2017	Artist of the Year	Twice	Nominated	
Melon Music Awards	2017	Top 10 Artists	Twice	Won	
Melon Music Awards	2017	Netizen Popularity Award	Twice	Nominated	
Melon Music Awards	2017	Kakao Hot Star Award	Twice	Nominated	
Melon Music Awards	2018	Song of the Year	"Heart Shaker"	Nominated	
Melon Music Awards	2018	Best Dance – Female	"Heart Shaker"	Nominated	
Melon Music Awards	2018	Artist of the Year	Twice	Nominated	
Melon Music Awards	2018	Top 10 Artists	Twice	Won	
Melon Music Awards	2018	Netizen Popularity Award	Twice	Nominated	
Melon Music Awards	2018	Kakao Hot Star Award	Twice	Nominated	
Melon Music Awards	2019	Top 10 Artists	Twice	Nominated	
Melon Music Awards	2019	Netizen Popularity Award	Twice	Nominated	
Melon Music Awards	2019	Best Dance – Female	"Fancy"	Nominated	
Melon Music Awards	2021	Best Girl Group	Twice	Nominated	
Melon Music Awards	2021	Top 10 Artists	Twice	Nominated	
MTV Europe Music Awards	2016	Best Korean Act	Twice	Nominated	
MTV Europe Music Awards	2021	Best K-Pop	Twice	Nominated	
MTV Europe Music Awards	2022	Best K-Pop	Twice	Nominated	
MTV MIAW Awards	2019	K-Pop Explosion	Twice	Nominated	
MTV MIAW Awards	2021	K-Pop Domination	Twice	Nominated	
MTV MIAW Awards	2022	K-Pop Domination	Twice	Nominated	
MTV MIAW Awards	2023	K-Pop Domination	Twice	Nominated	
MTV Video Music Awards	2021	Best K-Pop	"Alcohol-Free"	Nominated	
MTV Video Music Awards	2022	Best K-Pop	"The Feels"	Nominated	
Music Awards Japan	2025	Best of Listeners' Choice: International Song	"Mamushi" (Remix) (Megan Thee Stallion featuring Twice)	Nominated	
Music Awards Japan	2026	Best K-Pop Song in Japan	"This Is For"	Nominated	
Music Awards Japan	2026	Best of Listeners' Choice: International Song	"This Is For"	Nominated	
Music Awards Japan	2026	Best K-Pop Artist	Twice	Nominated	
Nickelodeon Mexico Kids' Choice Awards	2023	Favorite K-Pop Group	Twice	Nominated	
Philippine K-pop Awards	2015	Rookie of the Year – Female	Twice	Won	
Philippine K-pop Awards	2016	Best Female Group	Twice	Won	
Philippine K-pop Awards	2016	Song of the Year	"Cheer Up"	Won	
Philippine K-pop Awards	2017	Song of the Year	"Likey"	Won	
Philippine K-pop Awards	2019	Best Female Group	Twice	Won	
Philippine K-pop Awards	2024	Best Female Group	Twice	Won	
Seoul Music Awards	2016	Bonsang Award	Twice	Nominated	
Seoul Music Awards	2016	New Artist Award	Twice	Nominated	
Seoul Music Awards	2016	Popularity Award	Twice	Nominated	
Seoul Music Awards	2016	Hallyu Special Award	Twice	Nominated	
Seoul Music Awards	2017	Record of the Year in Digital Release	"Cheer Up"	Won	
Seoul Music Awards	2017	Daesang Award	Twice	Nominated	
Seoul Music Awards	2017	Bonsang Award	Twice	Won	
Seoul Music Awards	2017	Female Dance Performance Award	Twice	Won	
Seoul Music Awards	2017	Popularity Award	Twice	Nominated	
Seoul Music Awards	2017	Hallyu Special Award	Twice	Nominated	
Seoul Music Awards	2018	Daesang Award	Twice	Nominated	
Seoul Music Awards	2018	Bonsang Award	Twice	Won	
Seoul Music Awards	2018	Popularity Award	Twice	Nominated	
Seoul Music Awards	2018	Hallyu Special Award	Twice	Nominated	
Seoul Music Awards	2019	Daesang Award	Twice	Nominated	
Seoul Music Awards	2019	Bonsang Award	Twice	Won	
Seoul Music Awards	2019	Popularity Award	Twice	Nominated	
Seoul Music Awards	2019	Hallyu Special Award	Twice	Nominated	
Seoul Music Awards	2020	Daesang Award	Twice	Nominated	
Seoul Music Awards	2020	Bonsang Award	Twice	Won	
Seoul Music Awards	2020	Popularity Award	Twice	Nominated	
Seoul Music Awards	2020	Hallyu Special Award	Twice	Nominated	
Seoul Music Awards	2020	QQ Music Most Popular K-Pop Artist Award	Twice	Nominated	
Seoul Music Awards	2021	Daesang Award	Twice	Nominated	
Seoul Music Awards	2021	Bonsang Award	Twice	Won	
Seoul Music Awards	2021	Popularity Award	Twice	Nominated	
Seoul Music Awards	2021	K-wave Popularity Award	Twice	Nominated	
Seoul Music Awards	2021	Fan PD Artist Award	Twice	Nominated	
Seoul Music Awards	2021	WhosFandom Award	Twice	Nominated	
Seoul Music Awards	2022	Bonsang Award	Twice	Nominated	
Seoul Music Awards	2022	Popularity Award	Twice	Nominated	
Seoul Music Awards	2022	K-wave Popularity Award	Twice	Nominated	
Seoul Music Awards	2023	Bonsang Award	Twice	Nominated	
Seoul Music Awards	2023	Popularity Award	Twice	Nominated	
Seoul Music Awards	2023	K-wave Popularity Award	Twice	Nominated	
Seoul Music Awards	2024	Bonsang Award	Twice	Nominated	
Seoul Music Awards	2024	Popularity Award	Twice	Nominated	
Seoul Music Awards	2024	K-wave Popularity Award	Twice	Nominated	
Seoul Music Awards	2025	Main Prize (Bonsang)	Twice	Nominated	
Seoul Music Awards	2025	Popularity Award	Twice	Nominated	
Seoul Music Awards	2025	K-Wave Special Award	Twice	Nominated	
Seoul Music Awards	2025	K-pop World Choice – Group	Twice	Nominated	
Shibuya Note Awards	2018	Buzz of the Year	Twice	Nominated	
Shorty Awards	2020	Best in Music	Twice	Won	
Soompi Awards	2017	Best Female Group	Twice	Won	
Soompi Awards	2017	Artist of the Year	Twice	Nominated	
Soompi Awards	2017	Breakout Artist	Twice	Nominated	
Soompi Awards	2017	Best Choreography	"Cheer Up"	Nominated	
Soompi Awards	2017	Song of the Year	"Cheer Up"	Nominated	
Soompi Awards	2017	Fuse Music Video of the Year	"Cheer Up"	Nominated	
Soompi Awards	2017	Best Stage Outfit	"Cheer Up"	Nominated	
Soompi Awards	2017	Album of the Year	Page Two	Nominated	
Soompi Awards	2018	Artist of the Year	Twice	Nominated	
Soompi Awards	2018	Album of the Year	Twicecoaster: Lane 2	Nominated	
Soompi Awards	2018	Song of the Year	"Signal"	Nominated	
Soompi Awards	2018	Best Stage Outfit	"Signal"	Nominated	
Soompi Awards	2018	Best Female Group	Twice	Nominated	
Soompi Awards	2018	Best Choreography	"Knock Knock"	Nominated	
Soribada Best K-Music Awards	2017	Digital Daesang Award	Twice	Won	
Soribada Best K-Music Awards	2017	Bonsang Award	Twice	Won	
Soribada Best K-Music Awards	2017	Popularity Award	Twice	Nominated	
Soribada Best K-Music Awards	2018	Digital Daesang Award	Twice	Won	
Soribada Best K-Music Awards	2018	Bonsang Award	Twice	Won	
Soribada Best K-Music Awards	2018	Female Popularity Award	Twice	Nominated	
Soribada Best K-Music Awards	2018	Global Fandom Award	Twice	Nominated	
Soribada Best K-Music Awards	2019	Music of the Year	Twice	Won	
Soribada Best K-Music Awards	2019	Bonsang Award	Twice	Won	
Soribada Best K-Music Awards	2019	Female Popularity Award	Twice	Won	
Soribada Best K-Music Awards	2020	New K-Wave Favorite Female Bias	Twice	Won	
Soribada Best K-Music Awards	2020	Bonsang Award	Twice	Won	
Soribada Best K-Music Awards	2020	Artist of the Year	Twice	Won	
Spotify Awards	2020	Most Listened to K-Pop Artist: Female	Twice	Nominated	
Telehit Awards	2019	Best K-pop of the Year	Twice	Nominated	
TMElive International Music Awards	2025	Most Influential Overseas Group of the Year	Twice	Won	
V Live Awards	2016	V Refreshing Youngster Award	Twice	Won	
V Live Awards	2017	Global Artist Top 10	Twice	Won	
V Live Awards	2018	Global Artist Top 10	Twice	Won	
V Live Awards	2019	Artist Top 10	Twice	Won	
V Live Awards	2019	Best Channel – 3 million followers	Twice	Won	
V Live Awards	2019	The Most Loved Artist	Twice	Nominated	
V Live Awards	2019	Global Artist Top 12	Twice	Won	

== Other accolades ==
=== State honors ===
Name of country, year given, and name of honor
Country	Year	Honor	Ref.
South Korea (Note: Honors are given at the Korean Popular Culture and Arts Awards, arranged by the Korea Creative Content Agency and hosted by the Ministry of Culture, Sports and Tourism. This is an annual South Korean government-run award ceremony first held in 2010, which aimed to "honor[s] those who have made a contribution to contemporary pop culture and the arts, including actors, singers, comedians and models.")	2017	Minister of Culture, Sports and Tourism Commendation	
South Korea	2025	Prime Minister's Commendation	

=== Listicles ===
Name of publisher, year listed, name of listicle, and placement
Publisher	Year	Listicle	Placement	Ref.
Forbes Korea	2017	Korea Power Celebrity 40	3rd	
Forbes Korea	2018	Korea Power Celebrity 40	3rd	
Forbes Korea	2019	Korea Power Celebrity 40	21st	
Forbes Korea	2020	Korea Power Celebrity 40	9th	
Forbes Korea	2021	Korea Power Celebrity 40	12th	
Forbes Korea	2022	Korea Power Celebrity 40	17th	
Forbes Korea	2025	K-Idol of the Year 30	9th	
IZM	2025	The 25 Greatest Musicians of the first 25 Years of the 21st Century	Placed	
Teen Vogue	2024	21 Best Girl Groups of All Time	Placed	
