= List of K-pop Hot 100 number ones =

The K-pop Hot 100 is a music singles chart launched in South Korea by Billboard in conjunction with Billboard Korea on August 25, 2011. The chart was based on digital sales via leading websites, as well as downloads from mobile service sites using an industry-standard formula and the most credible music data sources within South Korea. The chart was first discontinued in 2014, as of the July 16 issue, and reestablished three years later in December 2017—the first new issue published was for the period dated May 29–June 4, 2017. It was discontinued again in April 2022. The final song to reach number-one on the K-pop Hot 100 was "Love Dive" by Ive, on the issue dated April 30.

== List of number-one songs ==
Key
†	Indicates the best-performing song of a year

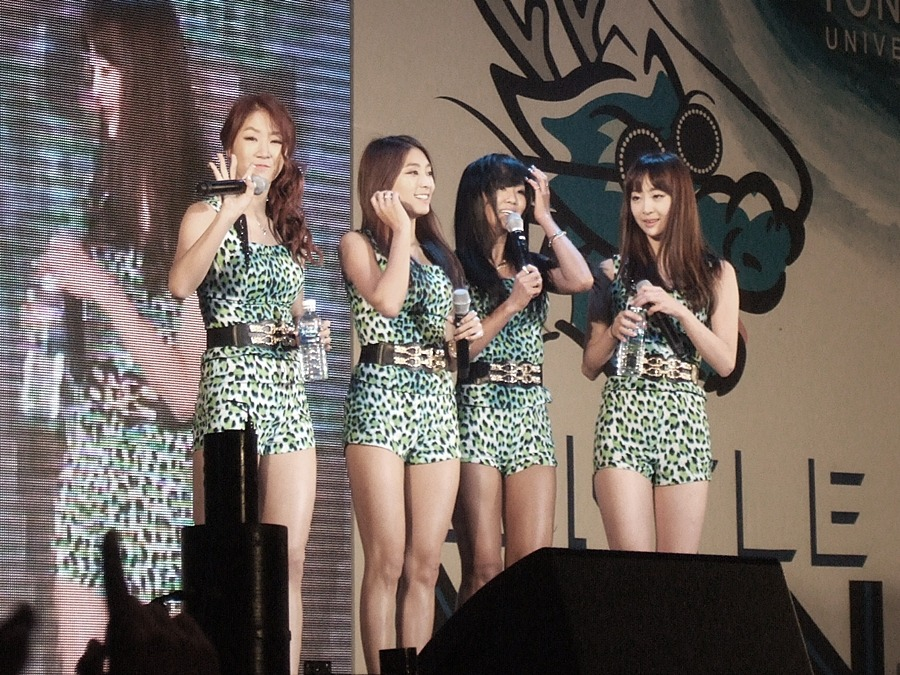
Sistar scored their first K-pop Hot 100 number-one in 2011 with "So Cool", and subsequently scored three further number ones with "Alone" and "Loving You" in 2012, and "Give It to Me" in 2013.

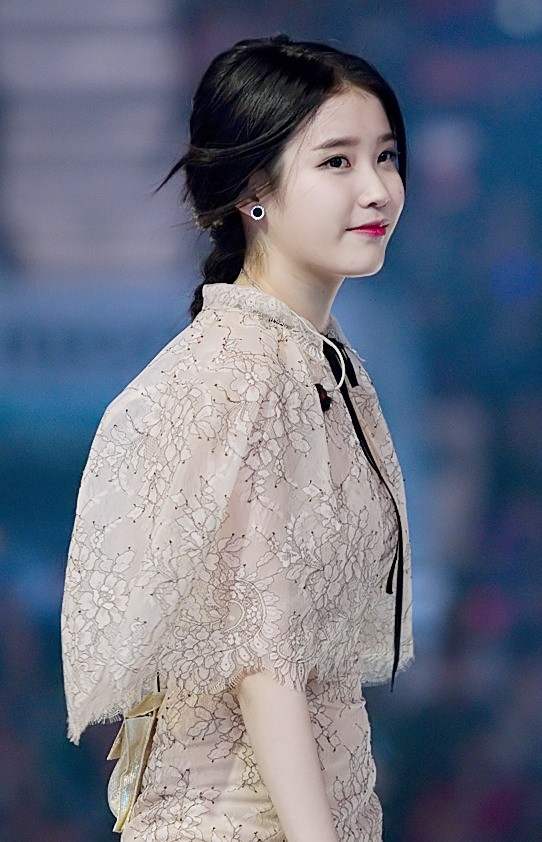
IU has achieved 18 number-ones on the K-pop Hot 100, the most of any artist to enter the chart, and holds the record for most weeks at number one for a solo artist with a cumulative total of 53 weeks.

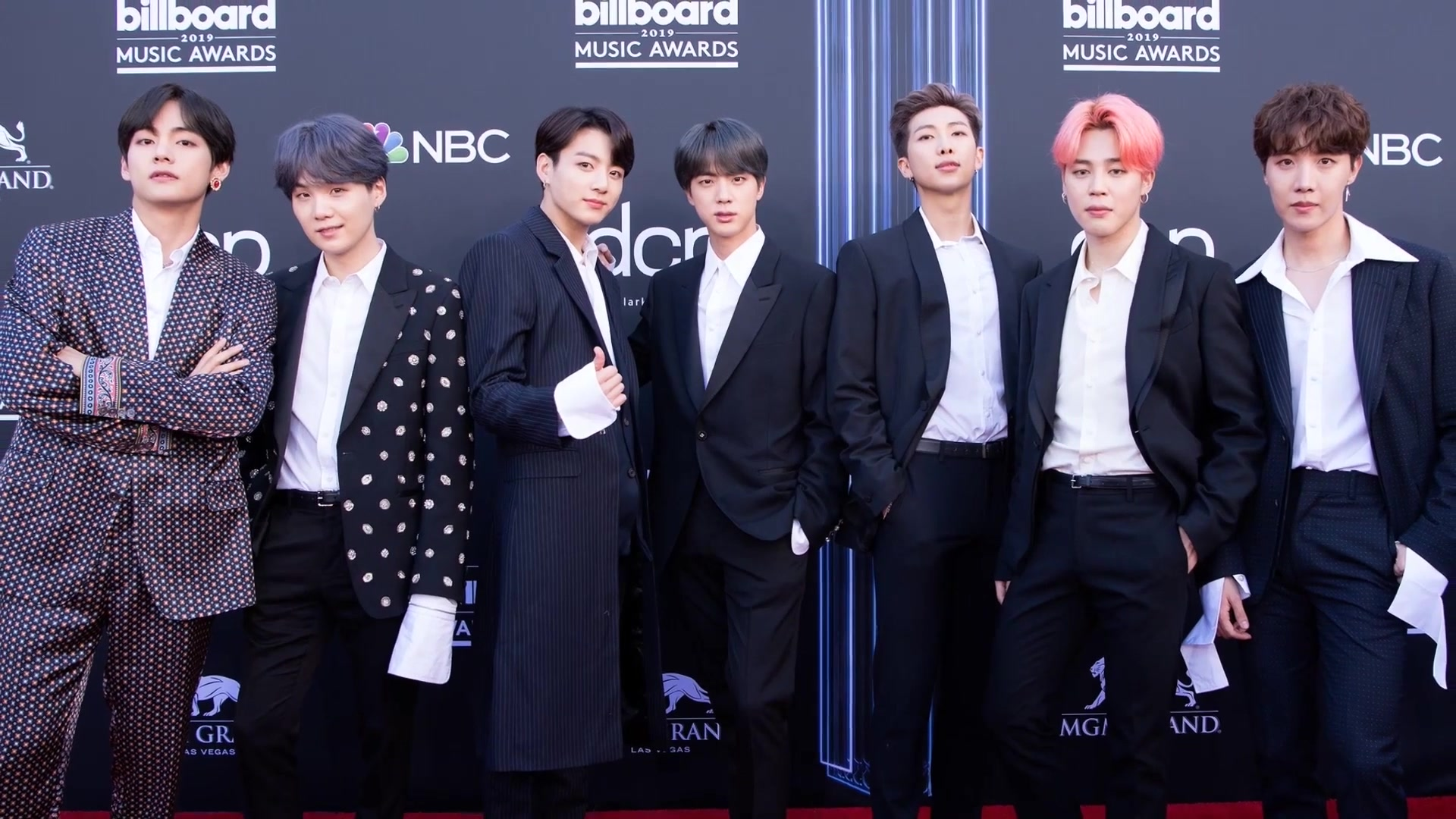
BTS has achieved the most number-one songs among all male groups to enter the K-pop Hot 100 with eight, and holds the all-time record for most weeks at number one among all artists and groups with a cumulative total of 49 weeks. Their 2020 single "Dynamite" is the longest-running number-one in the chart's history—it spent 22 weeks atop the ranking.

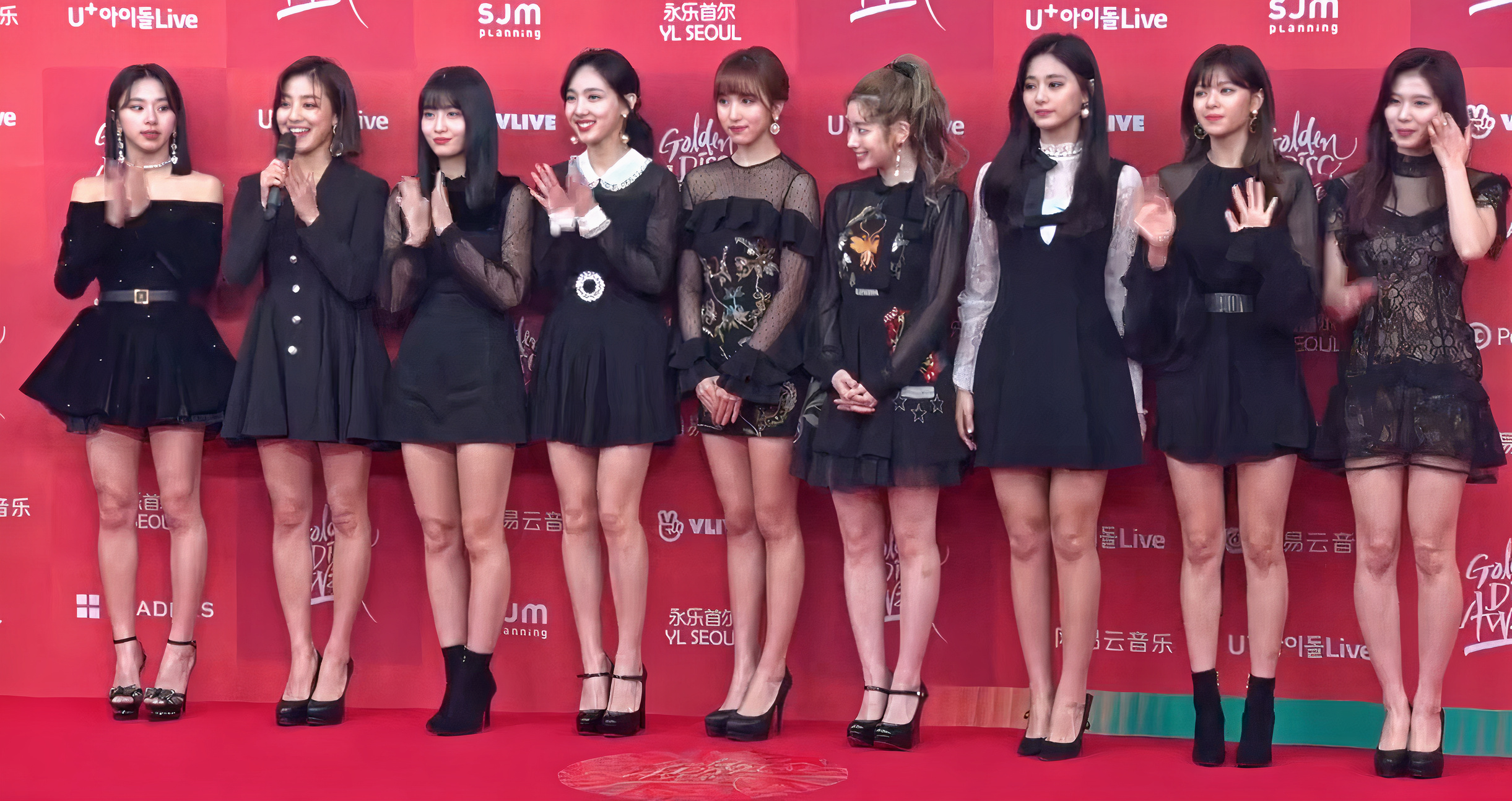
Twice has the most number-one songs of any girl group to rank on the chart, with six.

Issue date	Song	Artist(s)	Wks.	Ref.
August 20, 2011	"Goodbye Baby"	Miss A	1	
August 27, 2011	"Roly-Poly"	T-ara	1	
September 3, 2011	"So Cool"	Sistar	1	
September 10, 2011	"I Turned Off the TV..."	Leessang featuring Yoon Mi-rae, Kwon Jung-yeol	1	
September 17, 2011	"Don't Say Goodbye"	Davichi	3	
October 8, 2011	"Hello"	Huh Gak	2	
October 22, 2011	"Tokyo Girl"	Busker Busker	1	
October 29, 2011	"Era of Love"	Lee Seung-gi	1	
November 5, 2011	"The Boys"	Girls' Generation	1	
November 12, 2011	"I Miss You"	Noel	1	
November 19, 2011	"The Western Sky"	Ulala Session	1	
November 26, 2011	"Be My Baby"	Wonder Girls	1	
December 3, 2011	"Cry Cry"	T-ara	2	
December 17, 2011	"You & I"†	IU	5	
2012
January 21, 2012	"Lovey-Dovey"	T-ara	3	
February 11, 2012	"To Turn Back Hands of Time"	Lyn	4	
March 10, 2012	"Blue"	Big Bang	3	
March 31, 2012	"I Wonder If You Hurt Like Me"	2AM	2	
April 14, 2012	"Cherry Blossom Ending"	Busker Busker	2	
April 28, 2012	"Alone"	Sistar	4	
May 26, 2012	"Every End of the Day"	IU	4	
June 23, 2012	"Monster"	BigBang	1	
June 30, 2012	"Like This"	Wonder Girls	1	
July 7, 2012	"If You Really Love Me"	Busker Busker	1	
July 14, 2012	"Loving U"	Sistar	1	
July 21, 2012	"I Love You"	2NE1	2	
August 4, 2012	"Gangnam Style"†	Psy	5	
September 8, 2012	"I Need You"	Huh Gak and Zia	1	
September 15, 2012	"All for You"	Seo In-guk and Jung Eun-ji	3	
October 6, 2012	"Memory of the Wind"	Naul	3	
October 27, 2012	"It's Cold"	Epik High featuring Lee Hi	1	
November 3, 2012	"Becoming Dust"	Jung Joon-young and Roy Kim	1	
November 10, 2012	"Please Don't"	K.Will	1	
November 17, 2012	"1, 2, 3, 4"	Lee Hi	3	
December 8, 2012	"Return"	Lee Seung-gi	6	
2013
January 19, 2013	"I Got a Boy"	Girls' Generation	2	
February 2, 2013	"Shower of Tears"	Baechigi featuring Ailee	2	
February 16, 2013	"Gone Not Around Any Longer"†	Sistar19	4	
March 16, 2013	"Snow Flower"	Gummy	2	
March 30, 2013	"And One"	Taeyeon	1	
April 6, 2013	"Cherry Blossom Ending"	Busker Busker	1	
April 13, 2013	"Rose"	Lee Hi	1	
April 20, 2013	"Love Blossom"	K.Will	1	
April 27, 2013	"Gentleman"	Psy	1	
May 4, 2013	"Bounce"	Cho Yong-pil	1	
May 11, 2013	"Bom Bom Bom"	Roy Kim	3	
June 1, 2013	"What's Your Name?"	4Minute	1	
June 8, 2013	"Bad Girls"	Lee Hyori	1	
June 15, 2013	"Will You Be Okay?"	Beast	1	
June 22, 2013	"Only You"	4Men	1	
June 29, 2013	"Give It to Me"	Sistar	2	
July 6, 2013	"My Love"	Lee Seung-chul	1	
July 20, 2013	"Missing You Today"	Davichi	2	
August 3, 2013	"U&I"	Ailee	2	
August 17, 2013	"Rum Pum Pum Pum"	f(x)	1	
August 24, 2013	"Bar Bar Bar"	Crayon Pop	2	
September 7, 2013	"Crazy of You"	Hyolyn	1	
September 14, 2013	"Touch Love"	Yoon Mi-rae	3	
October 5, 2013	"Stupid in Love"	Soyou featuring Mad Clown	1	
October 12, 2013	"Love, At First"	Busker Busker	2	
October 26, 2013	"The Red Shoes"	IU	2	
November 9, 2013	"You Don't Know Love"	K.Will	1	
November 16, 2013	"Now"	Trouble Maker	1	
November 23, 2013	"I Got C"	Park Myung-soo and Primary	1	
November 30, 2013	"The Letter"	Davichi	1	
December 7, 2013	"Break Up Dinner"	San E featuring Sanchez of Phantom	1	
December 14, 2013	"One Way Love"	Hyolyn	1	
December 21, 2013	"Loved You"	Seo In-guk and Zia	1	
December 28, 2013	"Winter Confession"	Sung Si-kyung, Seo In-guk, Park Hyo-shin and VIXX	1	
2014
January 4, 2014	"Friday"	IU	2	
January 18, 2014	"Wind That Blows"	MC the Max	1	
January 25, 2014	"Like a Star"	K.Will	1	
February 1, 2014	"Some Occasional Showers"	Gary featuring Crush	1	
February 8, 2014	"Goodbye"	Hyolyn	3	
March 1, 2014	"Some"†	Junggigo and Soyou	6	
April 12, 2014	"During That Meet Your"	Lee Sun-hee	1	
April 19, 2014	"Wildflowers"	Park Hyo-shin	1	
April 26, 2014	"200%"	AKMU	2	
May 10, 2014	"Not Spring, Love or Cherry Blossoms"	High4 and IU	2	
May 24, 2014	"The Lone Duckling"	g.o.d	1	
May 31, 2014	"My Old Story"	IU	1	
June 7, 2014	"You You You"	Fly To The Sky	1	
June 14, 2014	"Your Scent"	Jung In and Gary	1	
June 21, 2014	"Eyes, Nose, Lips"	Taeyang	3	
July 9, 2014	"Umbrella" (Note: The last recorded chart issue published by US Billboard was the issue dated June 21, 2014. Billboard Korea published four more chart issues after that date and was then discontinued. The final two song entries listed for 2014 are the number one debuts per its last two issues.)	Younha	1	
July 16, 2014	"Break Up To Make Up"	Huh Gak and Jung Eun-ji	1	
2017
June 4, 2017	"Don't Wanna Cry" (울고 싶지 않아)	Seventeen	1	
June 11, 2017	"Signal"	Twice	1	
July 9, 2017	"Yes I Am" (나로 말할 것 같으면)	Mamamoo	2	
July 23, 2017	"You, Clouds, Rain" (나로 말할 것 같으면)	Heize featuring Shin Yong-jae	1	
July 30, 2017	"Ko Ko Bop"	Exo	1	
September 3, 2017	"Like It" (좋니)	Yoon Jong-shin	2	
September 17, 2017	"Power"	Exo	1	
September 24, 2017	"We Are" (시차)	Woo Won-jae featuring Loco and Gray	1	
October 1, 2017	"DNA"	BTS	2	
October 15, 2017	"Some" (썸 탈꺼야)†	Bolbbalgan4	3	
November 5, 2017	"Love Story" (연애소설)	Epik High featuring IU	1	
November 12, 2017	"Likey"	Twice	2	
November 26, 2017	"Beautiful"	Wanna One	1	
December 3, 2017	"Yes" (좋아)	Yoon Jong-shin and Minseo	2	
December 17, 2017	"Emptiness in Memory" (기억의 빈자리)	Naul	1	
December 24, 2017	"Heart Shaker" (Note: Billboard resumed the K-pop 100 in 2017 with the issue dated December 30, but marked all 100 songs on the ranking as "New," likely to indicate the chart's restart, rather than 100 debuts, since many of the songs listed were released and charting prior to that date. To avoid any possible confusion for readers, the Billboard Korea chart issue is used for "Heart Shaker"'s debut instead.)	Twice	2	
2018
January 6, 2018	"Universe"	Exo	1	
January 13, 2018	"Sound of Winter" (겨울소리)	Park Hyo Shin	1	
January 20, 2018	"Good Old Days" (그날처럼)	Jang Deok Cheol	3	
February 10, 2018	"Love Scenario" (사랑을 했다)†	iKon	6	
March 24, 2018	"Starry Night" (별이 빛나는 밤)	Mamamoo	2	
April 7, 2018	"Boomerang" (부메랑)	Wanna One	3	
April 28, 2018	"What Is Love?"	Twice	1	
May 5, 2018	"Don't Give It To Me" (주지마)	Loco and Hwasa	3	
May 26, 2018	"DNA"	BTS	1	
June 2, 2018	"Fake Love"	BTS	3	
June 23, 2018	"Travel"	Bolbbalgan4	1	
June 30, 2018	"Ddu-Du Ddu-Du"	Blackpink	3	
July 21, 2018	"Dance The Night Away"	Twice	2	
August 4, 2018	"Way Back Home"	Shaun	1	
August 11, 2018	"SoulMate"	Zico featuring IU	1	
August 18, 2018	"Power Up"	Red Velvet	2	
September 1, 2018	"Idol"	BTS	3	
September 22, 2018	"Siren" (사이렌)	Sunmi	1	
September 29, 2018	"Lullaby"	Got7	1	
October 6, 2018	"There Has Never Been A Day I Haven't Loved You" (하루도 그대를 사랑하지 않은 적이 없었다)	Im Chang-jung	3	
October 27, 2018	"Bbibbi" (삐삐)	IU	2	
November 10, 2018	"Tempo"	Exo	2	
November 24, 2018	"Solo"	Jennie	2	
December 1, 2018	"Spring Breeze" (봄바람)	Wanna One	1	
December 15, 2018	"Fiancé" (아낙네)	Mino	1	
December 22, 2018	"Love Shot"	Exo	1	
December 29, 2018	"180 Degree" (180도)	Ben	3	
2019
January 19, 2019	"After You've Gone"	MC the Max	2	
January 26, 2019	"Gotta Go"	Chungha	1	
February 2, 2019	"Home"	Seventeen	1	
February 16, 2019	"Fire Up"	Woody	2	
March 2, 2019	"Twit"	Hwasa	2	
March 16, 2019	"Rooftop"	N.Flying	1	
March 23, 2019	"Lovedrunk"	Epik High featuring Crush	2	
April 6, 2019	"Four Seasons" (사계)	Taeyeon	2	
April 20, 2019	"Boy with Luv" (작은 것들을 위한 시)†	BTS featuring Halsey	7	
June 8, 2019	"If There Was Practice in Love"	Lim Jae Hyun	2	
June 22, 2019	"To Be Honest"	Kim Na-young	1	
June 29, 2019	"Drunk on Love"	Jang Hye-jin and Yoon Min-soo	2	
July 13, 2019	"UN Village"	Baekhyun	1	
July 20, 2019	"Thank You for Goodbye"	Ben	1	
July 27, 2019	"What a Life"	Exo-SC	1	
August 3, 2019	"What Are You Up To"	Kang Daniel	1	
August 10, 2019	"Remember Me"	Gummy	1	
August 17, 2019	"So Long"	Paul Kim	1	
August 24, 2019	"Umpah Umpah"	Red Velvet	2	
August 31, 2019	"Icy"	Itzy	2	
September 21, 2019	"Lalalay"	Sunmi	1	
September 28, 2019	"Feel Special"	Twice	1	
October 5, 2019	"How Can I Love the Heartbreak, You're the One I Love"	AKMU	4	
November 2, 2019	"Fame"	MC Mong featuring Song Ga-in and Chancellor	1	
November 9, 2019	"Love Poem"	IU	3	
November 30, 2019	"Blueming"	IU	3	
December 21, 2019	"Square (2017)"	Yerin Baek	1	
December 28, 2019	"Meteor"	Changmo	3	
2020
January 18, 2020	"Any Song"	Zico	6	
February 29, 2020	"On"	BTS	3	
March 21, 2020	"Start"	Gaho	4	
April 18, 2020	"Aloha"	Jo Jung-suk	3	
May 9, 2020	"Nonstop"	Oh My Girl	1	
May 16, 2020	"Eight"	IU featuring Suga	6	
June 27, 2020	"Downtown Baby"	Bloo	1	
July 4, 2020	"How You Like That"	Blackpink	4	
August 1, 2020	"Beach Again"	SSAK3	5	
September 5, 2020	"Dynamite"†	BTS	22	
2021
February 6, 2021	"Celebrity"	IU	7	
March 27, 2021	"Rollin'"	Brave Girls	2	
April 10, 2021	"Lilac" (라일락)	IU	4	
May 8, 2021	"Rollin'"	Brave Girls	4	
June 5, 2021	"Butter"	BTS	5	
July 10, 2021	"Foolish Love"	M.O.M	2	
July 24, 2021	"Permission to Dance"	BTS	3	
August 14, 2021	"Nakka" (낙하)	AKMU with IU	4	
September 11, 2021	"Traffic Light" (신호등)	Lee Mu-jin	8	
November 6, 2021	"Strawberry Moon"	IU	4	
December 4, 2021	"Merry-Go-Round" (회전목마)	Sokodomo featuring Zion.T and Wonstein	6	
2022
January 15, 2022	"Winter Sleep" (겨울잠)	IU	1	
January 22, 2022	"Merry-Go-Round" (회전목마)	Sokodomo featuring Zion.T and Wonstein	6	
March 5, 2022	"INVU"	Taeyeon	3	
March 26, 2022	"Ganadara"	Jay Park featuring IU	1	
April 2, 2022	"Tomboy"	(G)I-dle	3	
April 23, 2022	"Still Life" (봄여름가을겨울)	Big Bang	1	
April 30, 2022	"Love Dive"	Ive	1	
