= Merry & Happy =

2017 studio album by Twice

- Digital and Merry version cover

Studio album (reissue) by Twice
- Released: December 11, 2017
- Studios: JYPE; Studio Instinct; E.one Sound; Heavymental; NUPLAY; Studio567; Banzak
- Genres: K-pop; Christmas
- Length: 50:38
- Languages: Korean; English
- Label: JYP
- Producer: J.Y. Park "The Asiansoul"

Twice chronology
Twicetagram (2017)	Merry & Happy (2017)	What Is Love? (2018)

Singles from Merry & Happy
- 1. "Heart Shaker" Released: December 11, 2017

Merry & Happy is the reissue of South Korean girl group Twice's first studio album, Twicetagram. The Christmas-inspired album was released on December 11, 2017. In addition to the original track listing, it has two new songs: the first track is titled "Heart Shaker" and the eponymous second track "Merry & Happy" was written by Park Jin-young. The album and "Heart Shaker" debuted at No. 1 on four charts of Gaon—Album Chart and Digital Chart, Download Chart and Social Chart respectively, while "Merry & Happy" entered and peaked at No. 24 on Digital Chart.

Twice performed both "Heart Shaker" and "Merry & Happy" on music programs—Music Bank, Show! Music Core and Inkigayo on December 15–17, respectively. The music video of "Merry & Happy" was set for release on December 21, but was delayed until the next day out of respect for Shinee's Jonghyun, whose burial service was held on December 21.

== Track listing ==
Merry & Happy
No.	Title	Lyrics	Music	Arrangement	Length
1.	"Heart Shaker"	Galactika	David Amber; Sean Alexander	David Amber; Avenue 52	3:08
2.	"Merry & Happy"	J. Y. Park "The Asiansoul"	Joe Lawrence; Dawn Elektra; Sam Hocking	Joe Lawrence	3:16
3.	"Likey"	Black Eyed Pilseung; Jeon Gun	Black Eyed Pilseung; Jeon Gun	Rado	3:28
4.	"Turtle" (거북이; Geobugi)	Jeong Ho-hyun (e.one)	Jeong Ho-hyun (e.one)	Jeong Ho-hyun (e.one)	3:18
5.	"Missing U"	earattack; Dahyun; Chaeyoung	earattack	earattack; Yooki	3:00
6.	"Wow"	Mafly; Ponde; Lee Mi-so; Kako	Pop Time; Kriz	Pop Time	3:01
7.	"FFW"	Kiggen; Assbrass	Reign Write; NAOtheLAIZA	NAOtheLAIZA	3:46
8.	"Ding Dong"	Jowul	Risto Asikainen; Antti Hynninen	Antti Hynninen	3:32
9.	"24/7"	Nayeon; Jihyo	Daniel Caesar; Ludwig Lindell; Cazzi Opeia	Caesar & Loui	3:36
10.	"Look at Me" (날 바라바라봐; Nal barabarabwa)	Frants; Hyerim	Frants; Hyerim	Frants	3:13
11.	"Rollin'"	earattack; Yooki	earattack; Fox Stevenson	Fox Stevenson; earattack	3:11
12.	"Love Line"	Jeongyeon	Darren Smith; Tammy Infusino	Darren "Baby Dee Beats" Smith	3:17
13.	"Don't Give Up" (힘내!; Himnae!)	Chaeyoung	Chris Wahle; Thomas Harsem; Andreas Ohrn	Chris Wahle	2:58
14.	"You in My Heart" (널 내게 담아; Neol naege dama)	Jeong Ho-hyun (e.one); Choi Hyun-jun (e.one)	Jeong Ho-hyun (e.one); Choi Hyun-jun (e.one)	Jeong Ho-hyun (e.one); Choi Hyun-jun (e.one)	3:29
15.	"Jaljayo Good Night" (잘자요 굿나잇; Jaljayo gunnait)	Kevin Oppa (mr. cho)	Kevin Oppa (mr. cho)	Kevin Oppa (mr. cho)	4:23
Total length:					50:38

== Content production ==
Credits adapted from album liner notes.

=== Locations ===
Recording

- JYPE Studios, Seoul, South Korea
- Studio Instinct, Seoul, South Korea
- E.one Sound, Seoul, South Korea
- Heavymental Studios, Seoul, South Korea
- NUPLAY Studio, Seoul, South Korea
- Studio567, Seoul, South Korea
- Banzak Studio, Seoul, South Korea

Mixing

- Mirrorball Studios, North Hollywood, California
- JYPE Studios, Seoul, South Korea
- Studio Sean, Seoul, South Korea
- Cube Studio, Seoul, South Korea

Mastering

- Honey Butter Studio, Seoul, South Korea
- Sterling Sound, New York City, New York
- 821 Sound Mastering, Seoul, South Korea

=== Personnel ===
- J. Y. Park "The Asiansoul" – producer
- Lee Ji-young – direction and coordination (A&R)
- Jang Ha-na – music (A&R)
- Kim Yeo-joo (Jane Kim) – music (A&R)
- Park Sun-hyeong – music (A&R)
- Kim Ji-hyeong – production (A&R)
- Choi A-ra – production (A&R)
- Kim Je-na (Jenna Kim) – production (A&R)
- Gong Da-yoon – production (A&R)
- Kim Bo-hyeon – design (A&R)
- Kim Tae-eun – design (A&R), web design, album art direction
- Choi Hye-jin – recording, mixing and assistant mixing engineer
- Eom Se-hee – recording and assistant mixing engineer
- Jang Han-soo – recording and assistant mixing engineer
- Friday of Galactika – recording engineer and chorus (on "Heart Shaker")
- Jowul – recording engineer, vocal producer (on "Merry & Happy"), vocal director and background vocals (on "24/7")
- Jeong Ho-hyun – recording engineer, all instruments and keyboard (on "Turtle" and "You in My Heart")
- Earattack – recording engineer, and all instruments and computer programming (on "Missing U" and "Rollin'")
  - bass (on "Missing U"), background vocals (on "Rollin'") and director (on "Don't Give Up")
- Jeong Gyu-chang – recording engineer
- Kevin Oppa (mr. cho) – recording engineer, vocals producer (on "Love Line"), computer programming, piano and digital editing (on "Jaljayo Good Night")
- Frants – recording engineer, all instruments and computer programming (on "Look at Me")
- Tony Maserati – mixing engineer
- James Krausse – mixing engineer
- Lee Tae-seob – mixing engineer
- Lim Hong-jin – mixing and assistant mixing engineer
- Staytuned – mixing engineer
- Yoon Won-kwon – mixing engineer
- Jossi Ahjussi – mixing engineer
- Jeon Bu-yeon – assistant mixing engineer
- Bae So-yoon – assistant mixing engineer
- Park Jeong-eon – mastering engineer
- Chris Gehringer – mastering engineer
- Kwon Nam-woo – mastering engineer
- Naive Production – video director
- Kim Young-jo – video executive producer
- Yoo Seung-woo – video executive producer
- Choi Pyeong-gang – video co-producer
- Kim Young-joon at Agency SEED – photographer
- Kang Hye-in at Normallogic – album design
- Kang Hye-in at Normallogic – album design
- Choi Hee-seon at F. Choi – style director
- Son Eun-hee at Lulu – hair and makeup director
- Jung Nan-young at Lulu – hair and makeup director
- Choi Ji-young at Lulu – hair and makeup director
- Jo Sang-ki at Lulu – hair and makeup director
- Zia at Lulu – hair and makeup director
- Jeon Dal-lae at Lulu – hair and makeup director
- Won Jung-yo – makeup director
- Yoon Hee-so – choreographer
- Kang Da-sol – choreographer
- Today Art – printing
- David Amber – all instruments, computer programming (on "Heart Shaker")
- Avenue 52 – all instruments, additional programming (on "Heart Shaker")
- Galactika – vocal director (on "Heart Shaker")
- e.Na – chorus (on "Heart Shaker")
- Joe Lawrence – all instruments, computer programming (on "Merry & Happy")
- Jihyo of Twice – background vocals (on "Merry & Happy", "Likey", "Ding Dong" and "Love Line")
- Nayeon of Twice – background vocals (on "Merry & Happy" and "Likey")
- Kim Cho-young – background vocals (on "Merry & Happy")
- Rado – all instruments, computer programming and background vocals (on "Likey")
- Choi Hoon – bass (on "Turtle" and "You in My Heart")
- Yoon Tae-woong – guitar (on "Turtle" and "You in My Heart")
- Kim Yoon-ji – chorus (on "Turtle")
- Kim Jong-seong – guitar (on "Missing U")
- Nam Joo – background vocals (on "Missing U", "FFW" and "Rollin'")
- Jeong Yoo-ra at Cassette08 – digital editing (on "Missing U", "Rollin'" and "Don't Give Up")
- Jeong Dong-hwan & Park Ji-yong & Nusoul – keyboards (on "Wow")
- Kriz – background vocals (on "Wow")
- Park Gi-tae – guitar (on "Wow")
- NAOtheLAIZA – all instruments and computer programming (on "FFW")
- Antti Hynninen – all instruments and computer programming (on "Ding Dong")
- Caesar & Loui – all instruments and computer programming (on "24/7")
- Oh Han-sol – background vocals (on "Look at Me")
- Hyerim – background vocals (on "Look at Me")
- Fox Stevenson – all instruments and computer programming (on "Rollin'")
- Bin – background vocals (on "Rollin'" and "Don't Give Up")
- Darren Smith – all instruments and computer programming (on "Love Line")
- Chris Wahle – all instruments and computer programming (on "Don't Give Up")
- Kim So-ri – chorus (on "You in My Heart")
- Kim Jun-soo – guitar (on "Jaljayo Good Night")
- Lee Da-jeong – background vocals (on "Jaljayo Good Night")

== Charts ==
=== Weekly charts ===
Chart (2017)	Peak position
Japanese Digital Albums (Oricon)	15
Japan Hot Albums (Billboard)	38
South Korean Albums (Gaon)	1

=== Year-end charts ===
Chart (2017)	Position
South Korean Albums (Gaon)	19

Chart (2018)	Position
South Korean Albums (Gaon)	77

== Accolades ==
Year	Award	Category	Result	Ref.
2018	1st Korea Popular Music Awards	Best Album	Nominated	

== Release history ==
Release dates and formats for Merry & Happy
Region	Date	Format(s)	Label	Ref.
Various	December 11, 2017	Digital download; streaming	JYP	
South Korea	December 12, 2017	CD	JYP	
