= David Amber (producer) =

American music producer and artist

- Born: New Jersey
- Education: Drexel University
- Occupations: Record producer; songwriter
- Musical career
- Genres: K-pop; Pop; J-pop
- Instruments: keyboard; synthesizer
- Labels: JYP; SM Entertainment

David Amber is an American music producer and songwriter best known for writing and producing songs for Korean artists, including Twice, AOA, Exo-CBX, B.A.P, fromis_9, Hyoyeon, Up10tion, NCT, Oh My Girl, and Cravity. Amber also composes for television shows and advertisements.

== Early life and education ==
Amber was born in Wayne, New Jersey. He was interested in J-pop from a young age. Amber attended Drexel University, where he studied music industry.

== Career ==
In 2011, Amber moved to New York where he began working as an audio engineer and as an advertising and television composer. He composed and produced music for various television shows and commercials including The Voice, Dora and Friends: Into the City!, Butterbean's Café, Girl Code, National Geographic, Discovery Channel, Buick, JCPenney, and Macy's.

In 2012, SM Entertainment invited Amber to their concert in New York and suggested working together, starting his work in the K-pop market. He composed and produced Heo Young-saeng's "DraMagic!" In that same year, Amber moved to Los Angeles.

In 2016, he formed AmberSongs Production. He produced and composed Hyoyeon's "Mystery", which ranked 12th on the Billboard World Digital Song Sales chart. In 2017, Amber produced Twice's song "Heart Shaker" topping the Circle Chart and the K-Pop Hot 100. "Heart Shaker" ranked second on the Billboard global digital song sales, first on the Philippines Billboard Charts, and fourth in the Japanese Hot 100. In 2018, Amber and Andy Love composed Twice's "Yes or Yes", which reached No. 1 on the Gaon Chart, No. 5 on the Japan Hot 100, and received a Platinum Record from the Korea Music Copyright Association. In the same year, Amber worked on fromis_9's "Love Bomb", which was featured in the Billboard article "20 Best K-pop Songs of 2018".

Amber wrote songs including GFRIEND's "Love Bug", AOA's "DoDoDo", Oh My Girl's "Illusion", and EXO-CBX's "Ringa Ringa Ring". In 2018, he produced the song "Everyday Popstars" by JoJo Siwa, a singer-songwriter and dancer on YouTube. In 2019, he produced and featured in the song "Talk Talk" by YouTuber Wengie, and he worked on Astro's "Love Wheel", Luna's "Satellite", and NCT 127's "Blow My Mind".
