= List of Gaon Digital Chart number ones of 2017 =

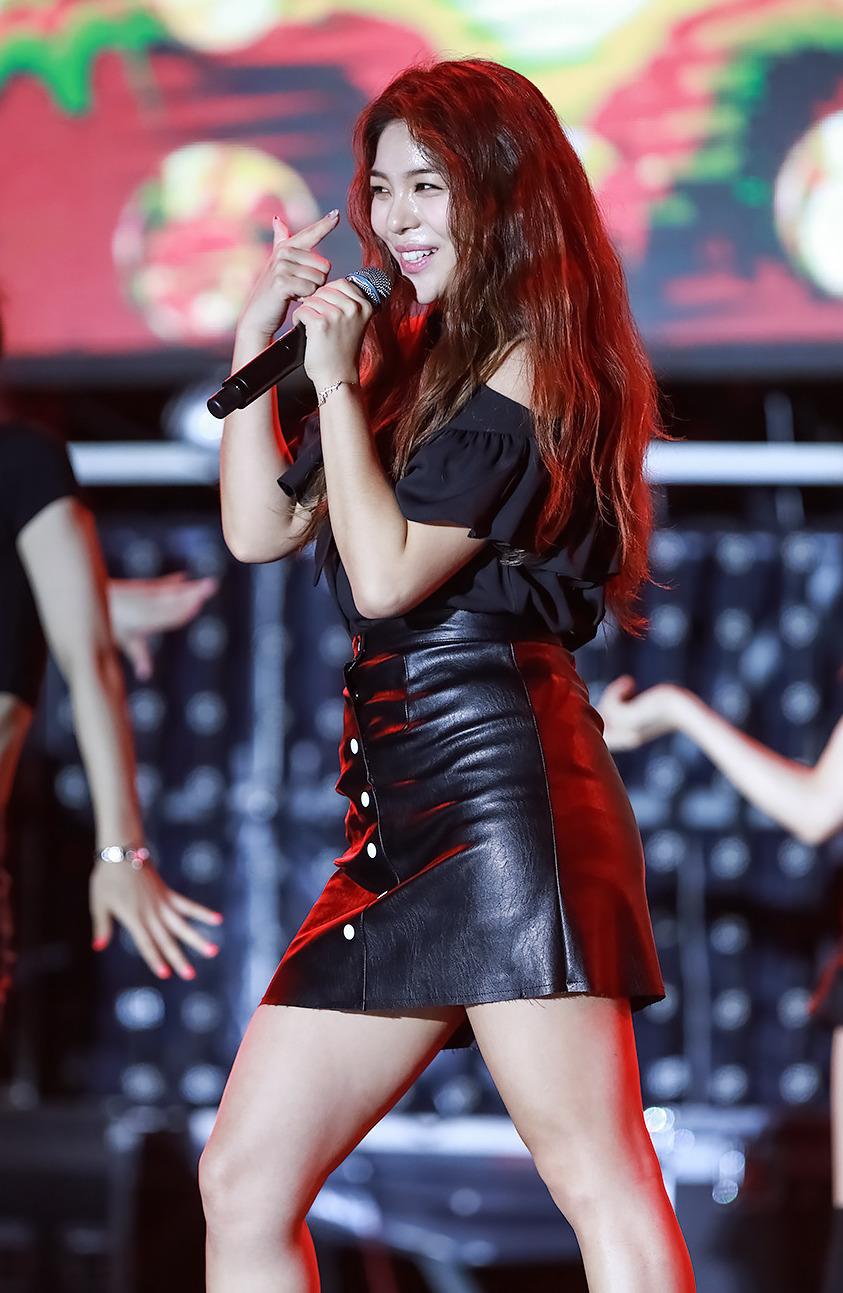
Ailee scored the best-performing song of 2017 with "I Will Go to You Like the First Snow"

The Gaon Digital Chart is a chart that ranks the best-performing singles in South Korea. Managed by the domestic Ministry of Culture, Sports and Tourism (MCST), its data is compiled by the Korea Music Content Industry Association and published by the Gaon Music Chart. The ranking is based collectively on each single's download sales, stream count, and background music use. In mid-2008, the Recording Industry Association of Korea ceased publishing music sales data. The MCST established a process to collect music sales in 2009, and began publishing its data with the introduction of the Gaon Music Chart the following February. With the creation of the Gaon Digital Chart, digital data for individual songs was provided in the country for the first time. Gaon provides weekly (listed from Sunday to Saturday), monthly and yearly charts. Below is a list of singles that topped the weekly and monthly charts.

== Weekly charts ==
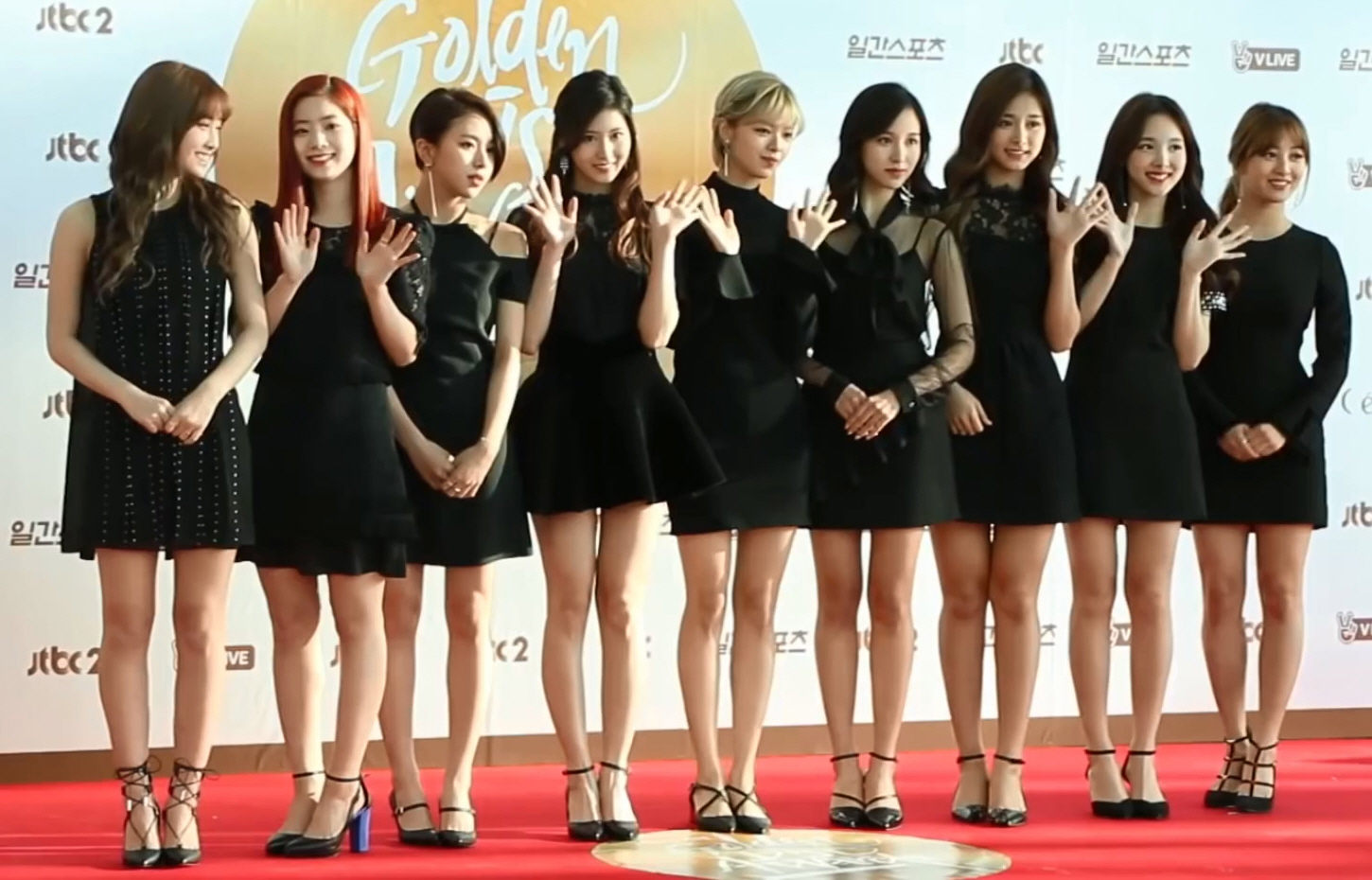
Twice scored four number-one singles in 2017—"Knock Knock", "Signal", "Likey" and "Heart Shaker".

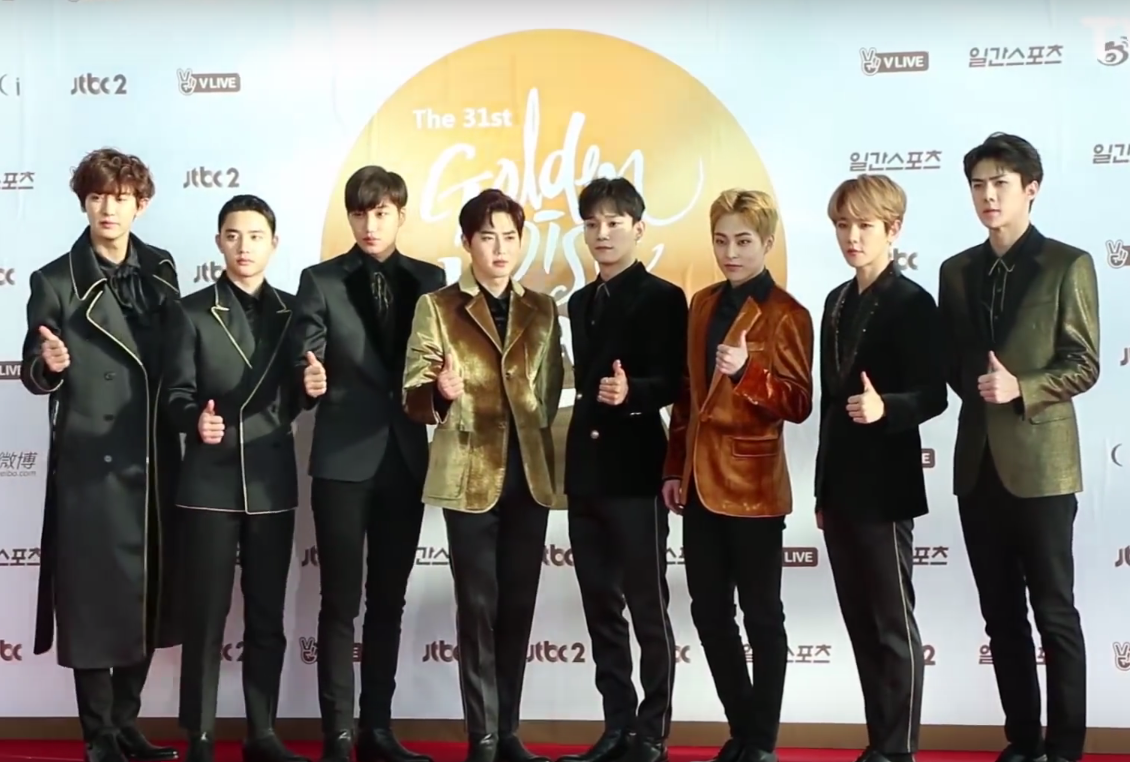
Exo's "Ko Ko Bop" topped the chart for four weeks and was the best-performing song of August.

Key
†	Indicates best-performing single of 2017

Week ending date	Song	Artist(s)	Ref.
January 7	"Your Night" (당신의 밤)	Hwang Kwanghee X Gaeko featuring Oh Hyuk	
January 14	"I Will Go to You like the First Snow" (첫눈처럼 너에게 가겠다) †	Ailee	
January 21	"I Will Go to You like the First Snow" (첫눈처럼 너에게 가겠다) †	Ailee	
January 28	"I Will Go to You like the First Snow" (첫눈처럼 너에게 가겠다) †	Ailee	
February 4	"The Song" (노래)	Zion.T	
February 11	"Yesterday"	Block B	
February 18	"Spring Day" (봄날)	BTS	
February 25	"Knock Knock"	Twice	
March 4	"Fine"	Taeyeon	
March 11	"Fine"	Taeyeon	
March 18	"Anymore" (부담이 돼)	Jung Key featuring Wheein	
March 25	"Plz Don't Be Sad" (얼굴 찌푸리지 말아요)	Highlight	
April 1	"Through the Night" (밤편지)	IU	
April 8	"Really Really"	Winner	
April 15	"Can't Love You Anymore" (사랑이 잘)	IU with Oh Hyuk	
April 22	"Palette" (팔레트)	IU featuring G-Dragon	
April 29	"Palette" (팔레트)	IU featuring G-Dragon	
May 6	"Be Well" (아프지 마요)	Sechs Kies	
May 13	"I Luv It"	Psy	
May 20	"Signal"	Twice	
May 27	"Signal"	Twice	
June 3	"Lonely"	Sistar	
June 10	"Untitled, 2014" (무제 (無題))	G-Dragon	
June 17	"We Loved" (남이 될 수 있을까)	Bolbbalgan4 and 20 Years of Age	
June 24	"We Loved" (남이 될 수 있을까)	Bolbbalgan4 and 20 Years of Age	
July 1	"Don't Know You" (널 너무 모르고)	Heize	
July 8	"You, Clouds, Rain" (비도 오고 그래서)	Heize featuring Shin Yong-jae	
July 15	"Red Flavor" (빨간 맛)	Red Velvet	
July 22	"Ko Ko Bop"	Exo	
July 29	"Ko Ko Bop"	Exo	
August 5	"Ko Ko Bop"	Exo	
August 12	"Energetic"	Wanna One	
August 19	"Ko Ko Bop"	Exo	
August 26	"Like It" (좋니)	Yoon Jong-shin	
September 2	"Gashina"	Sunmi	
September 9	"We Are" (시차)	Woo Won-jae featuring Loco and Gray	
September 16	"We Are" (시차)	Woo Won-jae featuring Loco and Gray	
September 23	"Autumn Morning" (가을 아침)	IU	
September 30	"Something Special" (특별해)	Sechs Kies	
October 7	"Some" (썸 탈꺼야)	Bolbbalgan4	
October 14	"Where You At"	NU'EST W	
October 21	"Something Special" (특별해)	Sechs Kies	
October 28	"Love Story" (연애소설)	Epik High featuring IU	
November 4	"Likey"	Twice	
November 11	"When We Were Two" (그때의 나, 그때의 우리)	Urban Zakapa	
November 18	"Beautiful"	Wanna One	
November 25	"Yes" (좋아)	Yoon Jong-shin and Minseo	
December 2	"Emptiness in Memory" (기억의 빈자리)	Naul	
December 9	"Snow" (눈)	Zion.T featuring Lee Moon-se	
December 16	"Heart Shaker"	Twice	
December 23	"Lonely"	Jonghyun featuring Taeyeon	
December 30	"Instagram"	Dean	

== Monthly charts ==
Month	Song	Artist(s)	Downloads – Streams	Ref.
January	"I Will Go to You like the First Snow" (첫눈처럼 너에게 가겠다) †	Ailee	615,858 – 25,996,361	
February	"I Will Go to You like the First Snow" (첫눈처럼 너에게 가겠다) †	Ailee	317,973 – 25,809,379	
March	"Fine"	Taeyeon	437,057 – 22,063,715	
April	"Can't Love You Anymore" (사랑이 잘)	IU with Oh Hyuk	561,450 – 24,564,126	
May	"I Luv It"	Psy	495,775 – 22,826,190	
June	"Untitled, 2014" (무제 (無題))	G-Dragon	555,587 – 22,262,836	
July	"You, Clouds, Rain" (비도 오고 그래서)	Heize featuring Shin Yong-jae	559,210 – 34,582,285	
August	"Ko Ko Bop"	Exo	411,635 – 16,268,825	
September	"We Are" (시차)	Woo Won-jae featuring Loco and Gray	511,542 – 28,649,846	
October	"Something Special" (특별해)	Sechs Kies	391,254 – 5,163,437	
November	"Gift" (선물)	MeloMance	349,010 – 31,002,949	
December	"Emptiness in Memory" (기억의 빈자리)	Naul	375,205 – 24,457,856	
