= Heart Shaker =

2017 single by Twice

- Galactika Holiday Remix cover

Single by Twice

from the album Merry & Happy
- Language: Korean
- Released: December 11, 2017
- Genre: Pop; dance
- Length: 3:08
- Label: JYP
- Composers: David Amber; Sean Alexander
- Lyricist: Galactika

Twice singles chronology
"Likey" (2017)	"Heart Shaker" (2017)	"Candy Pop" (2018)

Music video
- "Heart Shaker" on YouTube

"Heart Shaker" is a song recorded by South Korean girl group Twice. It was released by JYP Entertainment on December 11, 2017, as the lead single from Merry & Happy—the group's reissue of their first studio album, Twicetagram.

== Background and release ==
JYP Entertainment first teased "Heart Shaker" in the music video for "Likey". The words "Heart Shaker" were written on a street advertisement and an arch in the music video. The official Instagram post for "Likey" was also tagged with "#HeartShaker". On November 27, 2017, JYP Entertainment announced the release of the Christmas-inspired reissue of Twice's first full-length album Twicetagram, titled Merry & Happy, on December 11. The lead single "Heart Shaker" was revealed three days later. From December 4–11, several previews and teasers, including the song's lyrics, were released. The album, along with the music video for the lead single, was officially released on December 11. It was also released as a digital download on various music sites.

Twice's second compilation album #Twice2, released on March 6, 2019, includes both Korean and Japanese-language versions of "Heart Shaker". The Japanese lyrics were written by Risa Horie, Na.Zu.Na and Yu-ki Kokubo. On November 7, 2023, Twice released "Heart Shaker" (Galactika Holiday Remix) as part of the Amazon Music Originals holiday soundtrack.

== Composition ==
"Heart Shaker"
The chorus of "Heart Shaker" shows diverse voices of Nayeon, Tzuyu, Sana and Momo.

"Heart Shaker" is composed by David Amber and Sean Alexander, with lyrics by music production team Galactika (별들의전쟁). Tamar Herman from Billboard described the song as a "bright pop song [that] incorporates funky guitar riffs, twinkling synths, and soft harmonizing to create a vintage wintertime feel, but with an upbeat melody and impish delivery of the verses and the energetic chorus". Lyrically, the song is about a girl building up the courage to confess her love to the one who has "shaken" her heart.

== Commercial performance ==
The song debuted atop Gaon's Digital Chart and Billboard Korea's Kpop Hot 100. It also peaked at No. 2 and 4 on Billboard charts' World Digital Song Sales and Billboard Japan Hot 100, respectively. "Heart Shaker" surpassed 100 million streams in September 2019 and 2,500,000 downloads in March 2020 on Gaon Music Chart.

== Music video and promotion ==
A minute-long music video teaser for "Heart Shaker" was released on December 4, 2017. It features Twice in white long-sleeved T-shirts and jeans performing the chorus of the song on a set that looks like a store. Along with the album release, full version of the heart-themed music video was uploaded online on December 11. Unlike their previous Korean singles, it is heavily dance-oriented in variety of vibrant and retro-inspired sets. It ended with doubling the members in a finale dance sequence that offers up an eighteen-member Twice through mirrored choreography. On January 22, 2018, it surpassed 100 million views, 41 days after the video was uploaded on YouTube. It surpassed 200 million views on July 11, becoming Twice's fifth music video to achieve this. On December 10, 2021, the music had gained 400 million views on YouTube, becoming their seventh music video to do so.

On December 11, 2017, Twice had a live broadcast on Naver V Live to celebrate the album release. They also unveiled the full choreography of "Heart Shaker". Three days later, the group also attended SBS Love FM's Family Concert, where they performed the song live for the first time. Twice then performed "Heart Shaker" on music programs—Music Bank, Show! Music Core and Inkigayo on December 15, 16, 17, respectively.

== Accolades ==
Awards and nominations for "Heart Shaker"
Year	Award	Category	Result	Ref.
2017	Gaon Chart Music Awards	Artist of the Year – Digital Music (December)	Won	
2018	Melon Music Awards	Song of the Year	Nominated	
2018	Melon Music Awards	Best Dance – Female	Nominated	
2018	Korea Popular Music Awards	Best Digital Song	Won	
2019	Golden Disc Awards	Digital Daesang	Nominated	
2019	Golden Disc Awards	Digital Bonsang	Won	

Music program awards (9 total)
Program	Date	Ref.
M Countdown	December 21, 2017	
M Countdown	December 28, 2017	
Music Bank	December 22, 2017	
Music Bank	December 29, 2017	
Show! Music Core	December 23, 2017	
Show! Music Core	January 13, 2018	
Inkigayo	December 24, 2017	
Inkigayo	December 31, 2017	
Inkigayo	January 7, 2018	

== Charts ==
=== Weekly charts ===
Weekly chart performance
Chart (2017–2018)	Peak position
Japan (Japan Hot 100)	4
Japan Digital Singles (Oricon)	5
Philippines (Philippine Hot 100)	10
Philippines (BillboardPH K-pop Top 5)	1
South Korea (Gaon)	1
South Korea (Kpop Hot 100)	1
US World Digital Song Sales (Billboard)	2

=== Year-end charts ===
Year-end chart performance
Chart (2018)	Position
Japan (Japan Hot 100)	41
South Korean (Gaon)	38

== Certifications and sales ==
Certifications and sales
Region	Certification	Certified units/sales
South Korea	—	2,500,000
Streaming
Japan (RIAJ)	Platinum	100,000,000^{†}
South Korea	—	100,000,000
^{†} Streaming-only figures based on certification alone.

== See also ==
- List of Gaon Digital Chart number ones of 2017
- List of Kpop Hot 100 number ones
