= Jang Deok Cheol =

South Korean vocal group

- Origin: South Korea
- Genres: Pop ballad
- Years active: 2015–present
- Labels: Limez Entertainment
- Members: Jang Jung-hyeok (Jang); Kang Deok-in (Deok); Im Cheol (Cheol)

Jang Deok Cheol (Korean: 장덕철) is a South Korean vocal group consisting of members Jang Jung-hyeok, Kang Deok-in, and Im Cheol. While the group debuted in 2015, it did not achieve mainstream success until 2017, with the single, "Good Old Days". The single topped South Korean music charts at the beginning of 2018, drawing accusations that the group's label, Limez Entertainment, had manipulated chart rankings.

== Discography ==
=== Extended plays ===
Title	Album details	Peak chart positions	Sales
Title	Album details	KOR	Sales
Group	Released: July 6, 2018; Label: Limez Entertainment; Formats: CD, digital download; Track listing: 1. Kidult (키덜트); 2. Take A Picture (Deok & Cheol duet); 3. Beautiful (예쁘다) (Jang & Cheol duet); 4. Lateness (지각)	48	—

=== Singles ===
Title	Year	Peak chart positions		Sales (DL)	Album
Title	Year	KOR Gaon	KOR Hot 100	Sales (DL)	Album
"Our Old Selves" (그때, 우리로)	2015	—	—	KOR: 13,841+	Non-album singles
"The Unread Letter" (읽지못한편지)(反送)	2015	—	—	—	Non-album singles
"Dream" (꿈)	2015	—	—	—	Non-album singles
"Memoless" (기억)	2016	—	—	—	Non-album singles
"Good Old Days" (그날처럼)	2017	1	1	KOR: 98,534+	Non-album singles
"Lateness" (지각)	2018	41	45	—	Group
"If I Knew..." (알았다면)	2018	30	31	—	Non-album singles
"The Beginning" (시작됐나, 봄)	2019	47	51	—	Non-album singles
"See You Later" (있어줘요)	2019	5	—	—	Non-album singles
"You" (그대만이)	2020	76	—	—	Non-album singles

== Awards and nominations ==
=== Korea Popular Music Awards ===
Year	Category	Recipient	Result	Ref.
2018	Bonsang Award	Jang Deok Cheol	Won	
2018	Best Ballad	"Good Old Days"	Nominated	

=== MBC Plus X Genie Music Awards ===
Year	Category	Recipient	Result	Ref.
2018	Artist of the Year	Jang Deok Cheol	Nominated	
2018	Song of the Year	"Good Old Days"	Nominated	
2018	Vocal Track (Male)	"Good Old Days"	Nominated	
2018	Discovery Award	Jang Deok Cheol	Nominated	
2018	Genie Music Popularity Award	Jang Deok Cheol	Nominated	
