= Summer Nights (EP) =

2018 extended play by Twice

- Digital cover

EP (reissue) by Twice
- Released: July 9, 2018
- Studios: JYPE Studios (Seoul, South Korea)
- Genres: K-pop; dance
- Length: 29:44
- Languages: Korean; English
- Label: JYP
- Producer: J.Y. Park "The Asiansoul"

Twice chronology
What Is Love? (2018)	Summer Nights (2018)	BDZ (2018)

Singles from Summer Nights
- 1. "Dance the Night Away" Released: July 9, 2018

Summer Nights is the expanded reissue of What Is Love?, the fifth extended play release by South Korean girl group Twice. It was released on July 9, 2018, by JYP Entertainment.

== Background and release ==
On June 7, 2018, JYP Entertainment (JYPE) confirmed that Twice was scheduled to make a comeback in July and that the music video for the lead single was filmed in Japan. The title of the lead single, "Dance the Night Away", was revealed on June 18. Later that week, it was officially announced that Twice would release a special album titled Summer Nights, a reissue of their fifth extended play (EP) What Is Love?. The first group teaser photos were released on June 27. The next day, a partial track list was released, showing that singer Wheesung had written the lyrics for "Dance the Night Away". The full track list was released on June 30, revealing two more new songs: "Chillax" and "Shot Thru the Heart". The latter's lyrics were written by Twice's Japanese members Momo, Sana and Mina. A second set of group teaser images were released on July 1.

A short video preview of the three new songs was released on July 8. The album, along with the music video of "Dance the Night Away", was officially released the next day on various music portals.

== Promotion ==
On June 19, 2018, it was confirmed that Twice would guest on Idol Room, the group's first variety show for their comeback with Summer Nights.

== Track listing ==
No.	Title	Lyrics	Music	Arrangement	Length
1.	"Dance the Night Away"	Wheesung (Realslow)	Anne Judith Wik; Jonatan Gusmark (Moonshine), Ludvig Evers (Moonshine); Moa "Cazzi Opeia" Carlebecker; Seung-eun Oh; Andreas Baertels	Jonatan Gusmark & Ludvig Evers a.k.a. Moonshine	3:02
2.	"Chillax"	Star Wars (Galactika)	Lee Woo-min "collapsedone"; Valeria Del Prete	Lee Woo-min "collapsedone"	3:07
3.	"Shot Thru the Heart"	Momo; Sana; Mina	David Anthony Eames; Sophie White; Amy Richardson; Mayu Wakisaka	David Anthony Eames	3:26
4.	"What Is Love?"	J.Y. Park "The Asiansoul"	J.Y. Park "The Asiansoul"	Lee Woo-min "collapsedone"	3:29
5.	"Sweet Talker"	Jeongyeon; Chaeyoung	Erik Lidbom; MLC; Julie Yu	Erik Lidbom for Hitfire Production	3:29
6.	"Ho!"	Jihyo	Micky Blue; The Elev3n; Joren Van Der Voort	The Elev3n	3:10
7.	"Dejavu"	Chloe	Hayley Aitken; Jan Hallvard Larsen; Eirik Johansen; Anne Judith Wik; Ronny Vidar Svendsen; Nermin Harambašić	Aitken; Larsen; Johansen; Stokke Wik; Svendsen; Harambašić	3:17
8.	"Say Yes"	Lee Ju-hyeong (Monotree)	Lee Ju-hyeong (Monotree)	Lee Ju-hyeong (Monotree)	3:04
9.	"Stuck"	Star Wars (Galactika)	Frants; Valeria Del Prete; Sean Alexander	Frants; Avenue 52	3:35
Total length:					29:44

== Personnel ==
Credits adapted from album liner notes.

- J. Y. Park "The Asiansoul" – producer
- Lee Ji-young – direction and coordination (A&R)
- Jang Ha-na – music (A&R)
- Kim Yeo-joo (Jane Kim) – music (A&R)
- Kim Ji-hyeong – production (A&R)
- Cha Ji-yoon – production (A&R)
- Choi A-ra – production (A&R)
- Kim Bo-hyeon – design (A&R), album art direction and design
- Kim Tae-eun – design (A&R), album art direction and design, and web design
- Choi Jeong-eun – design (A&R) and album art direction and design
- Lee So-yeon – design (A&R), album art direction and design, and web design
- Seo Yeon-ah – design (A&R) and web design
- Choi Hye-jin – recording and mixing engineer, digital editor (on "Dance the Night Away")
- Lim Hong-jin – recording and mixing engineer
- Eom Se-hee – recording and mixing engineer
- No Min-ji – recording engineer
- Tony Maserati – mixing engineer
- James Krausse – mixing engineer
- Lee Tae-seop – mixing engineer
- Ko Hyeon-jeong – mixing engineer
- Master Key – mixing engineer
- Kwon Nam-woo – mastering engineer
- Naive Production – video director
- Kim Young-jo – video executive producer
- Yoo Seung-woo – video executive producer
- Kwak Gi-gon at TEO Agency – photographer
- Jung Nan-young at Lulu – hair director
- Son Eun-hee at Lulu – hair director
- Choi Ji-young at Lulu – hair director
- Jo Sang-ki at Lulu – makeup director
- Zia at Lulu – makeup director
- Jeon Dal-lae at Lulu – makeup director
- Won Jung-yo at Bit&Boot – makeup director
- Choi Su-ji at Bit&Boot – makeup director
- Oh Yu-ra – style director
- Shin Hyun-kuk – management and marketing director
- Kang Da-sol – choreographer
- Kim Sun-mi – choreographer
- Nana choreographer crew – choreographer
- Today Art – printing
- Moonshine – all instruments (on "Dance the Night Away")
- Wheesung (Realslow) – vocal director (on "Dance the Night Away")
- Kwon Seo-young – background vocals (on "Dance the Night Away")
- Jung Eun-kyung – digital editor (on "Dance the Night Away")
- Lee Woo-min "collapsedone" – all instruments, computer programming, guitar, and synths (on "Chillax" and "What Is Love?"), piano (on "What Is Love?")
- Friday of Galactika – vocal director (on "Chillax"), vocal producer and background vocals (on "What Is Love?" and "Stuck"), recording engineer (on "Stuck")
- E.Na – background vocals (on "Chillax", "What Is Love?" and "Stuck")
- David Anthony Eames – all instruments and computer programming (on "Shot Thru the Heart")
- Kevin Oppa – vocal director (on "Shot Thru the Heart")
- Park Sung-mi – background vocals (on "Shot Thru the Heart")
- Park Soo-min – background vocals (on "What Is Love?", "Sweet Talker" and "Ho!")
- Erik Lidbom – all instruments, computer programming, and digital editor (on "Sweet Talker")
- Armadillo – vocal director (on "Sweet Talker")
- Jiyoung Shin NYC – additional editor (on "Sweet Talker", "Ho!", and "Dejavu")
- The Elev3n – all instruments, computer programming, and digital editor (on "Ho!")
- Kim Seung-soo – vocal director (on "Ho!")
- Mental Audio (Eirik Johansen and Jan Hallvard Larsen) – all instruments and computer programming (on "Dejavu")
- Hayley Aitken – background vocals (on "Dejavu")
- Anne Judith Wik – background vocals (on "Dejavu")
- Jowul – vocal director (on "Dejavu")
- Lee Ju-hyeong – recording engineer, and vocal director, keyboard, Pro Tools operator, and digital editor (on "Say Yes")
- Jeon Jae-hee – background vocals (on "Say Yes")
- Jeok Jae – guitar (on "Say Yes")
- Kim Byeong-seok – bass (on "Say Yes")
- Frants – all instruments, computer programming, synth, bass, and drum (on "Stuck")
- Shane – guitar (on "Stuck")

=== Locations ===
Recording

- JYPE Studios, Seoul, South Korea

Mixing

- Mirrorball Studios, North Hollywood, California
- JYPE Studios, Seoul, South Korea
- Koko Sound, Seoul, South Korea
- 821 Sound, Seoul, South Korea

Mastering

- 821 Sound Mastering, Seoul, South Korea

== Charts ==
=== Weekly charts ===
Chart (2018)	Peak position
Japan Hot Albums (Billboard)	14
Japanese Albums (Oricon)	4
Japanese Digital Albums (Oricon)	6
South Korean Albums (Gaon)	1
US World Albums (Billboard)	4

=== Year-end charts ===
Chart (2018)	Position
Japanese Albums (Oricon)	55
South Korean Albums (Gaon)	16

== Certifications ==
Region	Certification	Certified units/sales
South Korea (KMCA)	2× Platinum	500,000^{^}
^{^} Shipments figures based on certification alone.

== Accolades ==
Year	Award	Category	Result	Ref.
2019	8th Gaon Chart Music Awards	Artist of the Year – Physical Album (3rd Quarter)	Nominated	

== Release history ==
Release dates and formats for Summer Nights
Region	Date	Format(s)	Label	Ref.
Various	July 9, 2018	Digital download; streaming	JYP	
South Korea	July 10, 2018	CD	JYP	
