= Twice2 =

2019 compilation album by Twice

#Twice2
- Standard edition cover

Compilation album by Twice
- Released: March 6, 2019
- Studio: JYPE
- Genres: J-pop; K-pop
- Length: 34:19
- Languages: Japanese; Korean; English
- Label: Warner Music Japan
- Producer: J.Y. Park "The Asiansoul"

Twice chronology
The Year of "Yes" (2018)	#Twice2 (2019)	Fancy You (2019)

Singles from #Twice2
- 1. "Likey (Japanese ver)" Released: January 10, 2019; 2. "What Is Love? (Japanese ver)" Released: February 7, 2019

#Twice2 (Hashtag Twice2) is the second Japanese compilation album by South Korean girl group Twice. It consists of both Korean and Japanese versions of "Likey", "Heart Shaker", "What Is Love?", "Dance the Night Away" and "Yes or Yes". It was released by Warner Music Japan on March 6, 2019.

== Background and release ==
In January 2019, JYP Entertainment announced that Twice would release their second Japanese compilation album on March 6, as well as embark on a dome tour in Japan later that month. "Likey (Japanese ver.)" was pre-released on January 10 as a digital single, along with an accompanying music video. "What Is Love? (Japanese ver.)" was pre-released as a digital single on February 7, also with an accompanying music video.

#Twice2 was officially released on March 6 in three versions: Standard Edition, First Press Limited Edition A (CD and photo book) and Limited Edition B (CD and DVD). It was also released as a digital download in EP format, containing only the five Japanese-language songs.

== Promotion ==
On March 8, 2019, Twice performed a medley of "Yes or Yes (Japanese ver.)", "Likey (Japanese ver.)" and "What Is Love? (Japanese ver.)" on Music Station.

== Commercial performance ==
The album debuted at number 1 on the daily ranking of Oricon Albums Chart with 95,825 units sold, breaking Twice's record of the highest first day album sales for K-pop girl groups in Japan. It was also reported that shipments of the album exceeded 250,000 copies. #Twice2 then topped the weekly Oricon Albums Chart with 200,846 units sold. It is the first album by a foreign female artist to sell more than 200,000 albums in the first week since Kara's Super Girl in 2011. On Oricon Digital Album Chart, it debuted at number 2 with 5,192 download count. It also topped the Billboard Japan Hot Albums chart, recording 211,406 copies sold.

== Track listing ==
#Twice2 — Standard edition
No.	Title	Lyrics	Music	Arrangement	Length
1.	"Likey" (Japanese version)	Black Eyed Pilseung; Jeon Goon; Mayu Wakisaka	Black Eyed Pilseung; Jeon Goon	Rado	3:29
2.	"Heart Shaker" (Japanese version)	Galactika; Risa Horie; Na.Zu.Na; Yu-ki Kokubo	David Amber; Sean Alexander	David Amber; Avenue 52	3:08
3.	"What Is Love?" (Japanese version)	J.Y. Park "The Asiansoul"; Risa Horie	J.Y. Park "The Asiansoul"	Min Lee "collapsedone"	3:30
4.	"Dance the Night Away" (Japanese version)	Wheesung (Realslow); Eri Osanai	Anne Judith Stokke Wik; Jonatan Gusmark & Ludvig Evers a.k.a. Moonshine; Moa Anna Carlebecker Forsell a.k.a. Cazzi Opeia; Seung-eun Oh; Andreas Baertels	Jonatan Gusmark & Ludvig Evers a.k.a. Moonshine	3:03
5.	"Yes or Yes" (Japanese version)	Sim Eun-jee; Yuka Matsumoto	David Amber; Andy Love	David Amber	4:01
6.	"Likey"	Black Eyed Pilseung; Jeon Goon	Black Eyed Pilseung; Jeon Goon	Rado	3:29
7.	"Heart Shaker"	Galactika	David Amber; Sean Alexander	David Amber; Avenue 52	3:08
8.	"What Is Love?"	J.Y. Park "The Asiansoul"	J.Y. Park "The Asiansoul"	Min Lee "collapsedone"	3:30
9.	"Dance the Night Away"	Wheesung (Realslow)	Anne Judith Stokke Wik; Jonatan Gusmark & Ludvig Evers a.k.a. Moonshine; Moa Anna Carlebecker Forsell a.k.a. Cazzi Opeia; Seung-eun Oh; Andreas Baertels	Jonatan Gusmark & Ludvig Evers a.k.a. Moonshine	3:03
10.	"Yes or Yes"	Sim Eun-jee	David Amber; Andy Love	David Amber	4:01
Total length:					34:19

#Twice2 — Limited edition bonus DVD
No.	Title	Length
1.	"Likey" (Japanese version) (Music video)
2.	"Heart Shaker" (Japanese version) (Music video)
3.	"What Is Love?" (Japanese version) (Music video)
4.	"Dance the Night Away" (Japanese version) (Music video)
5.	"Yes or Yes" (Japanese version) (Music video)
6.	"Likey" (Music video)
7.	"Heart Shaker" (Music video)
8.	"What Is Love?" (Music video)
9.	"Dance the Night Away" (Music video)
10.	"Yes or Yes" (Music video)
11.	"Likey" (Japanese version) (Music video making movie)
12.	"Heart Shaker" (Japanese version) (Music video making movie)
13.	"What Is Love?" (Japanese version) (Music video making movie)
14.	"Dance the Night Away" (Japanese version) (Music video making movie)
15.	"Yes or Yes" (Japanese version) (Music video making movie)
16.	"#Twice2" (Jacket shooting making movie)

== Charts ==
=== Weekly charts ===
Chart (2019)	Peak position
Japan Hot Albums (Billboard)	1
Japanese Albums (Oricon)	1
Japanese Digital Albums (Oricon)	2

=== Year-end charts ===
Chart (2019)	Position
Japan Hot Albums (Billboard)	13
Japanese Albums (Oricon)	6

== Certifications ==
Region	Certification	Certified units/sales
Japan (RIAJ)	Platinum	250,000^{^}
^{^} Shipments figures based on certification alone.

== Release history ==
Release dates and formats for #Twice2
Region	Date	Format(s)	Edition	Label	Ref.
Various	March 6, 2019	Digital download; streaming	Standard Edition	Warner Music Japan	
Japan	March 6, 2019	CD	Standard Edition	Warner Music Japan	
Japan	March 6, 2019	CD + Photo Book	Limited Edition A	Warner Music Japan	
Japan	March 6, 2019	CD + DVD	Limited Edition B	Warner Music Japan	
Japan	September 27, 2023	Vinyl	Limited Edition	Warner Music Japan	
