= Dance the Night Away (Twice song) =

2018 single by Twice

Single by Twice

from the EP Summer Nights
- Language: Korean
- Released: July 9, 2018
- Recorded: 2018
- Studio: JYPE Studios (Seoul)
- Genre: Pop; EDM
- Length: 3:02
- Label: JYP
- Composers: Anne Judith Stokke Wik; Moonshine; Cazzi Opeia; Seung-eun Oh; Andreas Baertels
- Lyricist: Wheesung

Twice singles chronology
"Wake Me Up" (2018)	"Dance the Night Away" (2018)	"BDZ" (2018)

Music video
- "Dance the Night Away" on YouTube

"Dance the Night Away" is a song recorded by South Korean girl group Twice. It was released by JYP Entertainment on July 9, 2018, as the lead single from the group's reissue of their fifth extended play, Summer Nights.

== Background and release ==
Twice's new release was first revealed on June 7, 2018. On June 18, it was officially announced by JYP Entertainment that the group would make a comeback with a new single titled "Dance the Night Away". It is the lead single of their album Summer Nights. Both song and the album were released on July 9 on various music portals. Twice's second compilation album #Twice2, released on March 6, 2019, includes both Korean and Japanese versions of the song. The Japanese lyrics were written by Eri Osanai.

== Composition ==
"Dance the Night Away" was composed by several music producers and has lyrics written by Wheesung. It was described as a "song that offers a fresh tune that suits the summer weather" and was meant to showcase the group's youthfulness. It is a vivacious electronic dance music track with an upbeat tempo. Tamar Herman from Billboard described the song as a "summery EDM and groovy pop track that bounces around over a beat of thumping bass, bright horns, and blaring synths."

== Music video and promotion ==
The music video of "Dance the Night Away" was filmed on an Okinawa beach in early June 2018. Two video teasers were first released on July 1 and 5. The full music video was uploaded online on July 9. It features the nine members of Twice as castaways who wash up on a beach. Two months after its release, the music video recorded 100 million views on YouTube. It also ranked seventh on the 2018 YouTube Rewind list in the category for the 10 Most Popular Music Videos in South Korea.

A few hours after the release of the song, Twice held a live broadcast on Naver V Live to commemorate their comeback, where they also performed the full choreography of the song for the first time. The group also performed "Dance the Night Away" for their comeback stages on Music Bank, Show! Music Core, Inkigayo, Show Champion and M Countdown on July 13, 14, 15, 18 and 19, respectively.

== Commercial performance ==
The song debuted atop the Gaon Digital Chart and Billboard Korea's Kpop Hot 100. It also peaked at number 2, 5 and 11 on Billboard charts' World Digital Song Sales, Billboard Japan Hot 100 and Oricon Digital Singles, respectively. "Dance the Night Away" surpassed 100 million streams in March 2019 and 2,500,000 downloads in September 2019, making it the group's first single to earn a Platinum certification in both streaming and downloads from the Korea Music Content Association (KMCA) since certifications were introduced in April 2018.

== Accolades ==
"Dance the Night Away" won 10 music program awards in South Korea, including triple crowns (or 3 awards) on Show! Music Core and Inkigayo. It received four consecutive Melon weekly popularity awards from July 23 to August 13 and was awarded Artist of the Year – Digital Music (July) at the 8th Gaon Chart Music Awards. In December 2018, it was named the 7th most viewed music video of 2018 in South Korea.

Music program awards
Program	Date	Ref.
Show Champion	July 18, 2018	
M Countdown	July 19, 2018	
Music Bank	July 20, 2018	
Music Bank	August 3, 2018	
Show! Music Core	July 21, 2018	
Show! Music Core	August 4, 2018	
Show! Music Core	August 11, 2018	
Inkigayo	July 22, 2018	
Inkigayo	July 29, 2018	
Inkigayo	August 5, 2018	

== Charts ==
=== Weekly charts ===
Weekly chart performance
Chart (2018)	Peak position
Japan (Japan Hot 100)	5
Japan Digital Singles (Oricon)	11
Singapore (RIAS)	13
South Korea (Gaon)	1
South Korea (K-pop Hot 100)	1
US World Digital Song Sales (Billboard)	2

=== Year-end charts ===
2018 year-end chart performance for "Dance the Night Away"
Chart (2018)	Position
Japan (Japan Hot 100)	90
South Korean (Gaon)	20

2019 year-end chart performance for "Dance the Night Away"
Chart (2019)	Position
South Korea (Gaon)	75

== Certifications ==
Certifications
Region	Certification	Certified units/sales
South Korea (KMCA)	Platinum	2,500,000^{*}
Streaming
Japan (RIAJ)	Platinum	100,000,000^{†}
South Korea (KMCA)	Platinum	100,000,000^{†}
^{*} Sales figures based on certification alone.^{†} Streaming-only figures based on certification alone.

== See also ==
- List of certified songs in South Korea
- List of Gaon Digital Chart number ones of 2018
- List of Kpop Hot 100 number ones
- List of M Countdown Chart winners (2018)
