= Likey =

2017 single by Twice

Single by Twice

from the album Twicetagram
- Language: Korean
- Released: October 30, 2017
- Genre: K-pop; electropop
- Length: 3:28
- Label: JYP
- Songwriters: Black Eyed Pilseung; Jeon Gun
- Producer: Rado

Twice singles chronology
"One More Time" (2017)	"Likey" (2017)	"Heart Shaker" (2017)

Music video
- "Likey" on YouTube

"Likey" (stylized in all caps) is a song recorded by South Korean girl group Twice. It was released by JYP Entertainment on October 30, 2017, as the lead single from their first studio album Twicetagram.

== Background and release ==
Twice's comeback with their first full-length album, along with the lead single "Likey", was officially announced on October 16, 2017. The two music video teasers for the song were uploaded online on October 28. "Likey" and its music video was released on the 30th as a digital download on various music sites. Twice's second compilation album #Twice2, released on March 6, 2019, includes both Korean and Japanese-language versions of "Likey". The Japanese lyrics were written by Mayu Wakisaka. "Likey (Japanese ver.)" was pre-released on January 10 as a digital single, along with an accompanying music video.

== Composition ==
"Likey"
The chorus part of "Likey" which describes as future electropop genre.

"Likey" was composed by Black Eyed Pilseung and Jeon Gun. It was Twice's fourth collaboration with Black Eyed Pilseung, after their hit singles "Like Ooh-Ahh", "Cheer Up" and "TT". The future electropop song opens with a synth-driven intro, and continues with children cheering, trumpeting horns, and old-school synthesizer samples throughout the track. Lyrically, it is about the agony of trying to elicit a social-media "like" from a crush, as well as the struggle of maintaining a beautiful social media image.

== Music video ==
Produced by Naive Creative Production for JYP Entertainment, the music video of "Likey" was directed by Kim Young-jo and Yoo Seung-woo. It was uploaded on October 30, 2017, at the official YouTube channel of JYP Entertainment. The music video was entirely filmed in Vancouver, British Columbia, Canada in early September 2017, showcasing some of the most iconic areas in the region. It was featured in CTV News Vancouver—stating that the video is expected to boost tourism of the city. Some parts of it were personally filmed by Twice leader Jihyo.

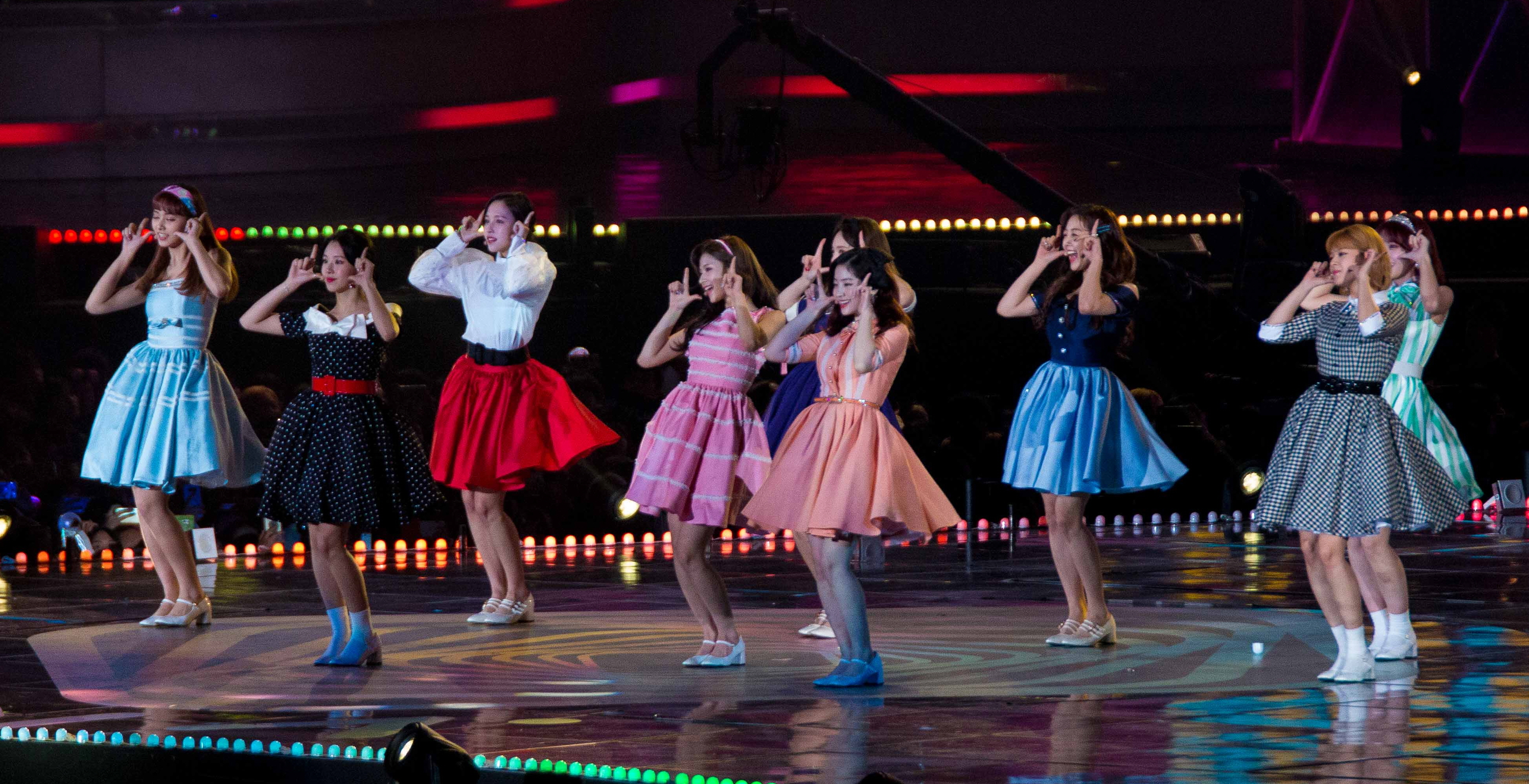
Twice performing "Likey" at the 2017 Melon Music Awards

Early on in the video, Twice is seen clowning around at the Sunset Beach roller hockey rink with views of the ocean and Granville Island behind them. They also gather in a gelato shop called Ocean Rock Cafe on Marine Drive in White Rock. Backdrops for the dance routine include Gastown alley and Maple Tree Square, Alley Oop (the colourful downtown backlane between Granville Street and Seymour streets) and Stanley Park's Hallelujah Point. In the mix, it also features the Gastown Steam Clock, Angel Hand-Painted Fashions store, White Rock Pier, Steveston's Marine Garage and the SkyTrain while riding an old Mark I train.

On December 3, 2017, it set a new record of the fastest K-pop girl group music video to reach 100 million views on YouTube within 33 days. It surpassed 500 million views in February 2021.

== Commercial performance ==
"Likey" debuted at number 1 and 2 on the Gaon Digital Chart and the Billboard Japan Hot 100, respectively. It charted on top spot of Billboard charts' World Digital Song Sales and K-pop Hot 100 for two consecutive weeks. It also topped Billboard Japan's Hot Buzz Song for four consecutive weeks. "Likey" surpassed 100 million streams in February 2019 and 2,500,000 downloads in March 2020 on the Gaon Music Chart. "Likey" was certified Silver for streaming by the Recording Industry Association of Japan (RIAJ) after they introduced streaming certifications in April 2020. The song was subsequently certified Gold in June 2021 and Platinum in December 2024.

== Accolades ==
"Likey" won 8 music program awards, including a triple crown (3 wins) on Inkigayo and two wins on M Countdown. It was voted Song of the Year at the 2017 Philippine K-pop Awards and was nominated for Artist of the Year – Digital Music (October) at the 2018 Gaon Chart Music Awards, losing to "Love Story" by Epik High featuring IU.

Music program awards
Program	Date	Ref.
Show Champion	November 8, 2017	
M Countdown	November 9, 2017	
M Countdown	November 16, 2017	
Music Bank	November 10, 2017	
Show! Music Core	November 11, 2017	
Inkigayo	November 12, 2017	
Inkigayo	November 19, 2017	
Inkigayo	November 26, 2017	

== Charts ==
=== Weekly charts ===
Weekly chart performance
Chart (2017)	Peak position
Japan (Japan Hot 100)	2
Philippines (Philippine Hot 100)	11
Philippines (K-pop Top 5)	1
South Korea (Gaon)	1
South Korea (K-pop Hot 100)	1
US World Digital Song Sales (Billboard)	1

=== Year-end charts ===
2017 year-end chart performance for "Likey"
Chart (2017)	Position
South Korean (Gaon)	89

2018 year-end chart performance for "Likey"
Chart (2018)	Position
Japan (Japan Hot 100)	30
South Korean (Gaon)	63

== Certifications and sales ==
Certifications and sales
Region	Certification	Certified units/sales
South Korea	—	2,500,000
Streaming
Japan (RIAJ)	Platinum	100,000,000^{†}
South Korea	—	100,000,000
^{†} Streaming-only figures based on certification alone.

== See also ==
- List of Gaon Digital Chart number ones of 2017
- List of Kpop Hot 100 number ones
