= Twicetagram =

2017 studio album by Twice

- Digital cover

Studio album by Twice
- Released: October 30, 2017
- Studio: JYPE Studios (Seoul)
- Genres: K-pop; dance
- Length: 44:16
- Languages: Korean; English
- Label: JYP
- Producer: J. Y. Park "The Asiansoul"

Twice chronology
#Twice (2017)	Twicetagram (2017)	Merry & Happy (2017)

Singles from Twicetagram
- 1. "Likey" Released: October 30, 2017

Twicetagram is the debut studio album by South Korean girl group Twice. It was released on October 30, 2017, by JYP Entertainment. The title Twicetagram refers to their official Instagram account of the same name.

The group's first full-length album features a total of 13 tracks, supported by its lead single "Likey" which was composed by Black Eyed Pilseung and Jeon Gun, marking the group's fourth collaboration with Black Eyed Pilseung. Several composers and songwriters participated in the album's production, including the Korean members of Twice as lyricists, and former Wonder Girls member Hyerim who co-wrote and co-composed the eighth track titled "Look at Me".

The album received positive reception from several critics, and was also a commercial success for the group, reaching sales of over 320,000 copies and becoming the best-selling Korean girl group album in 2017. With the album and its lead single both debuting atop the Billboard World Albums and World Digital Song Sales charts respectively, Twice became the first female K-pop act to simultaneously top both charts. A reissue of Twicetagram, titled Merry & Happy, was released on December 11, 2017.

== Background and release ==
On September 8, 2017, it was first reported by media outlets that Twice had begun shooting a music video for an upcoming song in Canada. JYP Entertainment confirmed the reports, but stated that the exact date for the group's comeback was still undecided. On September 25, the agency stated that Twice's comeback was slated for late October, though the exact date was still undecided.

On October 15, a surprise trailer video for the upcoming album was shown to fans during the second day of the group's two-day fan meeting titled "Once Begins"—a commemoration of the second anniversary of their debut. The same video was uploaded to Twice's V Live channel at midnight on October 16, announcing that the group's first full-length album, Twicetagram (and its lead single "Likey"), was scheduled for release on October 30. The album is inspired by social media, with the title being a reference to the group's official Instagram account.

Twice uploaded their first group image teaser for their album on October 19, with the image employing a concept reminiscent of an Instagram post. On October 20, the group held a live broadcast on V Live in celebration of their second anniversary since debut, with the members revealing more details about their upcoming album. The members stated that they participated in the songwriting process, and that a total of 13 tracks will be featured in the album. Additionally, they sang a snippet of the songs "Turtle" and "You in My Heart". On October 21, the album's track list was released, confirming the 13 featured songs and revealing that the lead single "Likey" was produced by Black Eyed Pilseung. It also revealed that "Missing U" was written by members Dahyun and Chaeyoung (with the latter also writing "Don't Give Up"), "24/7" was penned by Nayeon and Jihyo, and "Love Line" was written by Jeongyeon. The group's senior labelmate and former Wonder Girls member Hyerim was also confirmed to have participated in the writing and composition for the track "Look at Me".

Twice then posted a second group image teaser on October 23. On October 24, the group posted individual teaser images for each member. A second set of teasers featuring moving images for each member were uploaded on the same day. On October 25–27, individual teaser videos featuring each member were released. The group uploaded their first music video teaser for "Likey" on October 28. A second music video teaser was released later on the same day, which revealed a part of the song's point choreography. A highlight medley which featured audio snippets for all tracks in the album was uploaded on October 29. Before the official release of Twicetagram on October 30, the group released a photo revealing the full lyrics of "Likey." The album, along with the music video for the lead single, was officially released on October 30 as a digital download on various music sites while the physical album was released the following day.

== Composition ==
Twice's first full-length album features a total of 13 songs. The lead single "Likey" is produced by South Korean producing duo Black Eyed Pilseung, marking the group's fourth collaboration with the duo following "Like Ooh-Ahh", "Cheer Up", and "TT". The song was described to have a future pop nature, lyrically inspired by social media culture with the members singing about following ideal beauty standards in an effort to attract the "like" of their romantic interests.

"Turtle" is a track employing acoustic-pop for its sonic base, and is described as being "modeled to sound like a fandom-dedicated track". It lyrically describes the romantic concerns between two people, wherein the person who is unable to express their feelings towards the other is compared to a turtle. Members Dahyun and Chaeyoung wrote the rap for the song "Missing U", which notably employed the use of a guitar. It was also composed by Earattack, who had previously worked with groups including Got7 and BTS. "Wow" is produced by Pop Time who is notable for working with Block B and Zico, and is described as an uptempo track that has a jazz base while being infused with a dance beat. "FFW" is a pop song lyrically describing a girl's wish to turn the time and go to the future for their love interest. "Ding Dong" lyrically depicts a high school prom setting, with the subject expressing their belief that a bell rings in the ear when falling in love. "24/7" was jointly written by Nayeon and Jihyo, and lyrically talks about seeking excitement in the middle of a 'boring' and repetitive lifestyle.

Twice's senior labelmate Hyerim participated in the songwriting and composition for "Look At Me", and was described as an upbeat pop-dance track. "Rollin" marked British producer Fox Stevenson's first participation in a K-pop song, with the track being described as having retro inspirations that lyrically talks about one's distress towards a friend who shows a fickle feeling. "Love Line" is penned by member Jeongyeon which lyrically depicts a shy confession of love. "Don't Give Up" is a track talking about self-confidence which is written by Chaeyoung. "You in My Heart" features the usage of an electric guitar, piano, and synth music, while lyrically stating one's gratitude for receiving love. The album's closing track "Jaljayo Good Night" is described as an acoustic ballad song, and was composed for the group's fanbase to listen to at the end of their day.

== Promotion ==
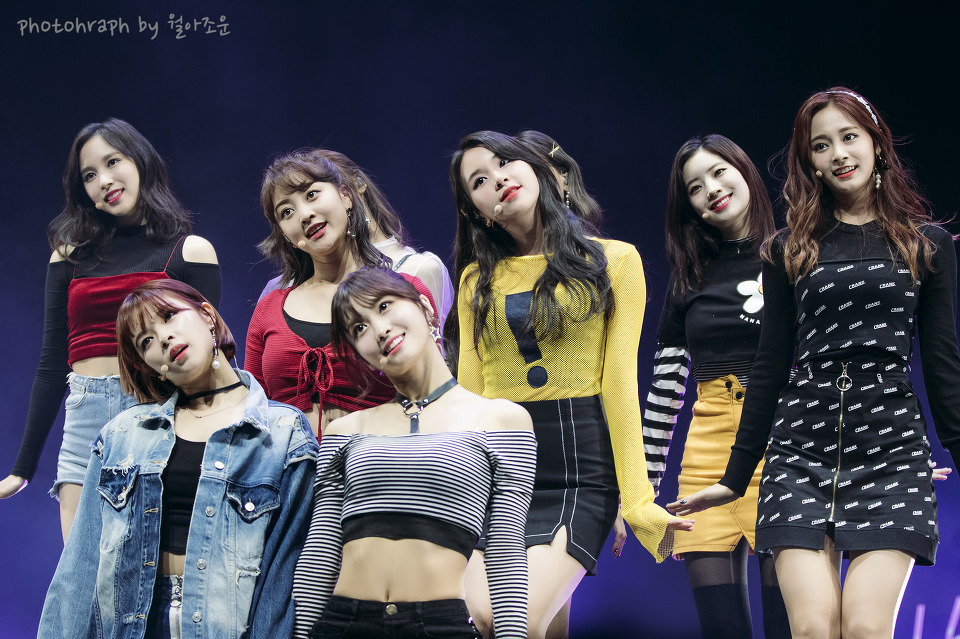
Twice performing "Knock Knock" during their showcase on October 30, 2017

On October 10, 2017, it was announced that Twice would film an episode of Weekly Idol as start of their full scale activities for the album. The group's appearance on the program was broadcast on November 1.

On the day of the album's release, Twice held a media showcase at the Yes24 Live Hall in Gwangjin-gu, Seoul. It was followed by a live showcase broadcast through Naver V Live, two hours after dropping the album online, where they performed "Likey" and "Turtle" for the first time, as well as hit songs from their previous albums including "Cheer Up", "TT", and "Knock Knock", among others.

The group promoted their album by performing on several South Korean music show programs, beginning with M Countdown on November 2. This was followed with performances on KBS2's Music Bank on November 3, SBS' Inkigayo on November 5, and on MBC M's Show Champion on November 8, among other performance dates. The album's lead single "Likey" earned a total of seven music show wins, gaining its last win on Inkigayo on November 26.

== Critical reception ==
Professional ratings
Review scores
Source	Rating
IZM	3/5 stars
The 405	8/10
The Kraze	9/10

Twicetagram was included on Billboard's "20 Best K-pop Albums of 2017: Critics' Picks" list. It placed at number 19 and was described as "an entire collection of incredible bubblegum hits". The album was also included in Affinity magazine's "Top 10 Best K-pop Albums of 2017" list, ranking at number 9. Writer Brianda Flores writes that the material shows "how much [Twice] improved from their first works". The Kraze magazine left a positive review for the album, giving it a rating of 9 out of 10 points, praising the production work and variety of genres featured in the material, citing the lead single "Likey" and the B-sides "Turtle", "Wow", and "Look At Me" to be the album's highlights.

Writing for IZM, critic Jo Hae-ram gave Twicetagram a rating of 3 out of 5 points, comparing the album to "having a bite of fresh fruit". The material was described to be a "fairly solid musical perfection", stating the album to be a clever work that manages to accurately focus on Twice's unique colors, but finding the group's 'immature' expressiveness as a regret. Jo cited the songs "Likey", "Turtle", "24/7", "Love Line", and "You in My Heart" to be the album's highlights, praising their production and composition, but having a mixed review for the track "Rollin", calling it to be 'awkward'.

Year-end lists
Publication	List	Rank	Ref.
Billboard	20 Best K-pop Albums of 2017: Critics' Picks	19	
Affinity	Top 10 Best K-pop Albums of 2017	9	

== Commercial performance ==
Twicetagram recorded over 330,000 stock pre-orders before its release, becoming Twice's best pre-order record until it was surpassed by their succeeding release, What Is Love?, in 2018. The album debuted atop the weekly Gaon Album Chart. The album and its lead single "Likey" also debuted atop both Billboard's World Albums and World Digital Song Sales respectively—the group's first number 1, making Twice the first female K-pop act to simultaneously lead on both charts. They also rose on Billboard's Heatseekers Albums chart as the album debuted at number 10, one position higher than Signal's peak at number 11.

It reached 100,000 unit sales within three days of its release, becoming the fastest-selling album by a K-pop girl group since 2002, with over 129,000 copies sold in its first week. (Note: S.E.S final studio album had sold 360,611 by the end of March 2002 and sold 78,740 during March 2002. Therefore, it sold 281,871 copies from its release date of February 14 through February 28, 2002.) The album became the second best-selling album on Gaon for the month of October, selling 276,575 physical copies. It is also the best-selling K-pop girl group album of 2017, which sold 320,389 copies at year-end.

== Track listing ==
Twicetagram
No.	Title	Lyrics	Music	Arrangement	Length
1.	"Likey"	Black Eyed Pilseung; Jeon Gun	Black Eyed Pilseung; Jeon Gun	Rado	3:28
2.	"Turtle" (거북이; Geobugi)	Jeong Ho-hyun (e.one)	Jeong Ho-hyun (e.one)	Jeong Ho-hyun (e.one)	3:18
3.	"Missing U"	Earattack; Dahyun; Chaeyoung	Earattack	Earattack; Yooki	3:00
4.	"Wow"	Mafly; Ponde; Lee Mi-so; Kako	Pop Time; Kriz	Pop Time	3:01
5.	"FFW"	Kiggen; Assbrass	Reign Write; NAOtheLAIZA	NAOtheLAIZA	3:46
6.	"Ding Dong"	Jowul	Risto Asikainen; Antti Hynninen	Antti Hynninen	3:32
7.	"24/7"	Nayeon; Jihyo	Daniel Caesar; Ludwig Lindell; Cazzi Opeia	Caesar & Loui	3:36
8.	"Look at Me" (날 바라바라봐; Nal barabarabwa)	Frants; Hyerim	Frants; Hyerim	Frants	3:13
9.	"Rollin'"	Earattack; Yooki	Earattack; Fox Stevenson	Fox Stevenson; Earattack	3:11
10.	"Love Line"	Jeongyeon	Darren Smith; Tammy Infusino	Darren "Baby Dee Beats" Smith	3:17
11.	"Don't Give Up" (힘내!; Himnae!)	Chaeyoung	Chris Wahle; Thomas Harsem; Andreas Ohrn	Chris Wahle	2:58
12.	"You in My Heart" (널 내게 담아; Neol naege dama)	Jeong Ho-hyun (e.one); Choi Hyun-jun (e.one)	Jeong Ho-hyun (e.one); Choi Hyun-jun (e.one)	Jeong Ho-hyun (e.one); Choi Hyun-jun (e.one)	3:29
13.	"Jaljayo Good Night" (잘자요 굿나잇; Jaljayo gunnait)	Kevin Oppa (mr. cho)	Kevin Oppa (mr. cho)	Kevin Oppa (mr. cho)	4:23
Total length:					44:16

Twicetagram – Thailand edition CD
No.	Title	Length
1.	"Heart Shaker"
2.	"Merry & Happy"
3.	"Likey"
4.	"Turtle"
5.	"Missing U"
6.	"Wow"
7.	"FFW"
8.	"Ding Dong"
9.	"24/7"
10.	"Look at Me"
11.	"Rollin'"
12.	"Love Line"
13.	"Don't Give Up"
14.	"You in My Heart"
15.	"Jaljayo Good Night"

Twicetagram – Thailand edition bonus DVD
No.	Title	Length
1.	"Likey" (Music video)
2.	"Heart Shaker" (Music video)
3.	"Merry & Happy" (Music video)
4.	"Likey" (Trailer)
5.	"Likey" (Music video teaser 1)
6.	"Likey" (Music video teaser 2)
7.	"Heart Shaker" (Music video teaser)
8.	"Heart Shaker" (Music video teaser (30s ver.))
9.	"Twice Hidden Film"
10.	"Likey" (Dance video (no CG ver.))
11.	"Heart Shaker" (Dance video (practice room ver.))
12.	"Heart Shaker" (Dance video (studio ver.))
13.	"Twicetagram" (Jacket behind)
14.	"Likey" (Music video behind)
15.	"Heart Shaker" (Music video behind)
16.	"Merry & Happy" (Music video behind)

== Personnel ==
Credits adapted from album liner notes.

- J. Y. Park "The Asiansoul" – producer
- Black Eyed Pilseung – co-producer
- Jeon Gun – co-producer
- Lee Eun-hee – album art directing and design (A&R)
- Choi Hye-jin – recording, mixing and assistant mixing engineer
- Eom Se-hee – recording and assistant mixing engineer
- Jang Han-soo – recording and assistant mixing engineer
- Jeong Ho-hyun – recording engineer, all instruments and keyboard (on "Turtle" and "You in My Heart")
- Earattack – recording engineer, and all instruments and computer programming (on "Missing U" and "Rollin'")
  - bass (on "Missing U"), background vocals (on "Rollin'") and director (on "Don't Give Up")
- Jeong Gyu-chang – recording engineer
- Kevin Oppa (mr. cho) – recording engineer, vocals producer (on "Love Line"), computer programming, piano and digital editing (on "Jaljayo Good Night")
- Frants – recording engineer, all instruments and computer programming (on "Look at Me")
- Lee Tae-seob – mixing engineer
- Lim Hong-jin – mixing and assistant mixing engineer
- Staytuned – mixing engineer
- Yoon Won-kwon – mixing engineer
- Jossi Ahjussi – mixing engineer
- Jeon Bu-yeon – assistant mixing engineer
- Bae So-yoon – assistant mixing engineer
- Chris Gehringer – mastering engineer
- Kwon Nam-woo – mastering engineer
- Naive Production – video director
- Kim Young-jo – video executive producer
- Yoo Seung-woo – video executive producer
- Choi Pyeong-gang – video co-producer
- Jeong Ji-eun at Agency VOTT – photographer
- Choi Hee-seon at F. Choi – style director
- Lim Ji-hyeon at F. Choi – style director
- Son Eun-hee at Lulu – hair director
- Jung Nan-young at Lulu – hair director
- Choi Ji-young at Lulu – hair director
- Jo Sang-ki at Lulu – makeup director
- Zia at Lulu – makeup director
- Jeon Dal-lae at Lulu – makeup director
- Today Art – printing
- Rado – all instruments, computer programming and background vocals (on "Likey")
- Jihyo of Twice – background vocals (on "Likey", "Ding Dong" and "Love Line")
- Nayeon of Twice – background vocals (on "Likey")
- Choi Hoon – bass (on "Turtle" and "You in My Heart")
- Yoon Tae-woong – guitar (on "Turtle" and "You in My Heart")
- Kim Yoon-ji – chorus (on "Turtle")
- Kim Jong-seong – guitar (on "Missing U")
- Nam Joo – background vocals (on "Missing U", "FFW" and "Rollin'")
- Jeong Yoo-ra at Cassette08 – digital editing (on "Missing U", "Rollin'" and "Don't Give Up")
- Jeong Dong-hwan & Park Ji-yong & Nusoul – keyboards (on "Wow")
- Kriz – background vocals (on "Wow")
- Park Gi-tae – guitar (on "Wow")
- NAOtheLAIZA – all instruments and computer programming (on "FFW")
- Antti Hynninen – all instruments and computer programming (on "Ding Dong")
- Caesar & Loui – all instruments and computer programming (on "24/7")
- Jowul – vocal director and background vocals (on "24/7")
- Oh Han-sol – background vocals (on "Look at Me")
- Hyerim – background vocals (on "Look at Me")
- Fox Stevenson – all instruments and computer programming (on "Rollin'")
- Bin – background vocals (on "Rollin'" and "Don't Give Up")
- Darren Smith – all instruments and computer programming (on "Love Line")
- Chris Wahle – all instruments and computer programming (on "Don't Give Up")
- Kim So-ri – chorus (on "You in My Heart")
- Kim Jun-soo – guitar (on "Jaljayo Good Night")
- Lee Da-jeong – background vocals (on "Jaljayo Good Night")

=== Locations ===
Recording

- JYPE Studios, Seoul, South Korea
- E.one Sound, Seoul, South Korea
- Heavymental Studios, Seoul, South Korea
- NUPLAY Studio, Seoul, South Korea
- Studio567, Seoul, South Korea
- Banzak Studio, Seoul, South Korea

Mixing

- JYPE Studios, Seoul, South Korea
- Studio Sean, Seoul, South Korea
- Cube Studio, Seoul, South Korea

Mastering

- Sterling Sound, New York City, New York
- 821 Sound Mastering, Seoul, South Korea

== Charts ==
=== Weekly charts ===
Weekly chart performance for Twicetagram
Chart (2017)	Peak position
French Download Albums (SNEP)	195
Japan Hot Albums (Billboard)	12
Japanese Albums (Oricon)	7
Japanese Digital Albums (Oricon)	3
South Korean Albums (Gaon)	1
US Heatseekers Albums (Billboard)	10
US World Albums (Billboard)	1

=== Year-end charts ===
Year-end chart performance for Twicetagram
Chart (2017–2018)	Position
Japanese Albums (Oricon)	63
South Korean Albums (Gaon)	12

== Accolades ==
Year	Award	Category	Result	Ref.
2018	32nd Golden Disc Awards	Album Daesang (Album of the Year)	Nominated	
2018	32nd Golden Disc Awards	Album Bonsang	Won	
2018	7th Gaon Chart Music Awards	Artist of the Year – Physical Album (4th Quarter)	Nominated	

== Release history ==
Release dates and formats for Twicetagram
Region	Date	Format(s)	Edition	Label	Ref.
Various	October 30, 2017	Digital download; streaming	Standard	JYP	
South Korea	October 31, 2017	CD	Standard	JYP	
Thailand	June 8, 2018	CD + DVD	Thailand	JYP; BEC-Tero Music	

== See also ==
- List of Gaon Album Chart number ones of 2017
