= Billboard Japan Year-End Hot 100 singles of 2018 =

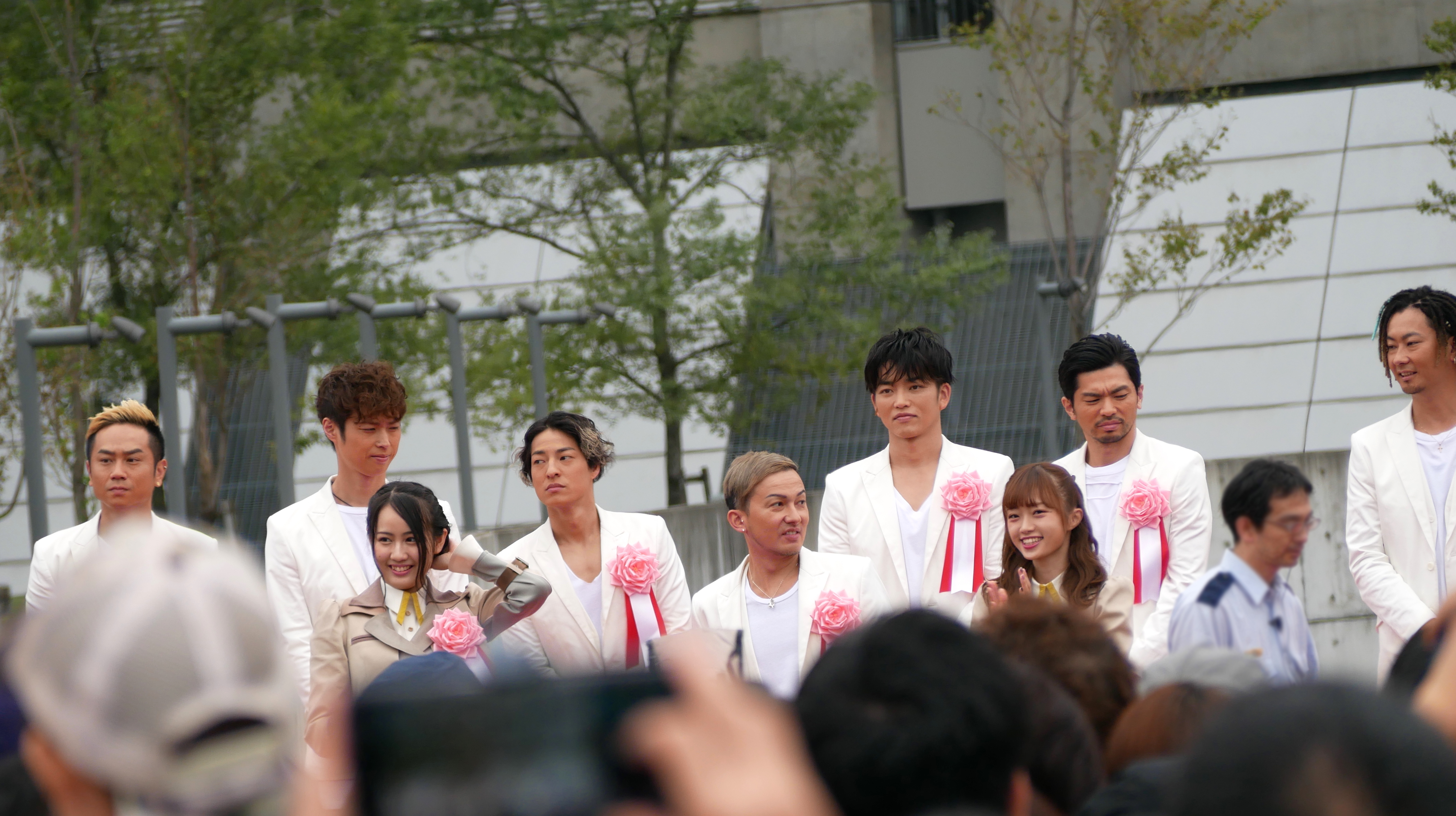
Da Pump (pictured) came in at second the top position of the Billboard Japan Hot 100 during 2018.

The Billboard Japan Hot 100 is a chart that ranks the best-performing singles in Japan. Published by Billboard Japan magazine and compiled by Nielsen SoundScan, it is based collectively on each single's weekly physical and digital sales, as well as airplay and streaming. The Billboard will publish an annual list of the 100 most successful songs throughout that year on the Hot 100 chart based on the information on performance. For 2018, the list was published on December 7, 2018.

== Year-end list ==
List of songs on Billboard Japan's 2018 Year-End Hot 100
No.	Title	Artist(s)
1	Lemon	Kenshi Yonezu
2	U.S.A	Da Pump
3	Glass wo Ware!	Keyakizaka46
4	Uchiage Hanabi	Daoko × Kenshi Yonezu
5	Doraemon	Gen Hoshino
6	Synchronicity	Nogizaka46
7	Jikochū de Ikō!	Nogizaka46
8	Candy Pop	Twice
9	Sayonara Elegy	Masaki Suda
10	Teacher Teacher	AKB48
11	Ambivalent	Keyakizaka46
12	Cinderella Girl	King & Prince
13	Fake Love	BTS
14	Shape of You	Ed Sheeran
15	Mabataki	Back Number
16	Loser	Kenshi Yonezu
17	Idea	Gen Hoshino
18	Wake Me Up	Twice
19	TT	Twice
20	Flamingo	Kenshi Yonezu
21	Kaerimichi wa Tōmawari Shitaku Naru	Nogizaka46
22	Natsu Hayate	Arashi
23	Dancing Hero	Yōko Oginome
24	DNA	BTS
25	Change	One Ok Rock
26	Hero	Namie Amuro
27	Ai no Katachi	Misia
28	Mic Drop	BTS Featuring Desiigner
29	What Is Love?	Twice
30	Likey	Twice
31	Peace Sign	Kenshi Yonezu
32	Sentimental Train	AKB48
33	Jabaja	AKB48
34	Haiiro to Ao (+ Masaki Suda)	Kenshi Yonezu
35	Find the Answer	Arashi
36	Hanabi	Mr. Children
37	Kaze ni Fukarete mo	Keyakizaka46
38	Ikinari Punch Line	SKE48
39	Dai Fuseikai	Back Number
40	Eine Kleine	Kenshi Yonezu
41	Heart Shaker	Twice
42	Memorial	King & Prince
43	Muishiki no Iro	SKE48
44	Kimi no Uta	Arashi
45	Anata	Hikaru Utada
46	Koi	Gen Hoshino
47	Silent Majority	Keyakizaka46
48	Marigold	Aimyon
49	Sazanka	Sekai no Owari
50	Fukyōwaon	Keyakizaka46
51	White Love	Hey! Say! JUMP
52	Daichi Miura	Daichi Miura
53	Blue	NEWS
54	Wherever You Are	One Ok Rock
55	Ikiro	NEWS
56	Mae Wo Muke	Hey! Say! JUMP
57	Ddu-Du Ddu-Du	Blackpink
58	Warota People	NMB48
59	Reboot	Toho Shinki
60	This Is Me	Keala Settle & The Greatest Showman Ensemble
61	Be the One	Pandora
62	Bboom Bboom	Momoland
63	Kanade	Sukima Switch
64	Topaz Love	KinKi Kids
65	Influencer	Nogizaka46
66	Havana	Camila Cabello ft.Young Thug
67	Ashita Mo	Shishamo
68	Kimi wa Rock o Kikanai	Aimyon
69	Ai o Tsutaetai Datoka	Aimyon
70	Hatsukoi	Hikaru Utada
71	Boku Datte Naichauyo	NMB48
72	Koko ni	Kanjani Eight
73	Cosmic Human	Hey! Say! JUMP
74	Shin Takarajima	Sakanaction
75	BDZ	Twice
76	Sign	Jejung
77	Rain	Sekai no Owari
78	Here Comes My Love	Mr. Children
79	I Love You	Kana Nishino
80	Hayaokuri Calendar	HKT48
81	Yokubomono	NMB48
82	Kimi.Boku.	Kis-My-Ft2
83	Ai o Komete Hanataba o	Superfly
84	Ao to Natsu	Mrs. Green Apple
85	Moshi Kimi o Yurusetara	Leo Ieiri
86	One More Time	Twice
87	Stay	Zedd and Alessia Cara
88	Sekai wa Anata ni Waraikakete Iru	Little Glee Monster
89	No Tears Left to Cry	Ariana Grande
90	Dance the Night Away	Twice
91	Orion	Kenshi Yonezu
92	Itsuka Dekiru kara Kyō Dekiru	Nogizaka46
93	Oldfashion	Back Number
94	No Doubt	Official Hige Dandism
95	I Want You Back	Twice
96	Don't Leave Me	BTS
97	Mugen Mirai	Perfume
98	Sekai wa Doko Made Aozora na no ka?	NGT48
99	L.O.V.E.	Kis-My-Ft2
100	J.S.B. Dream	Sandaime J Soul Brothers
