= List of Twice concert tours =

Twice concert tours
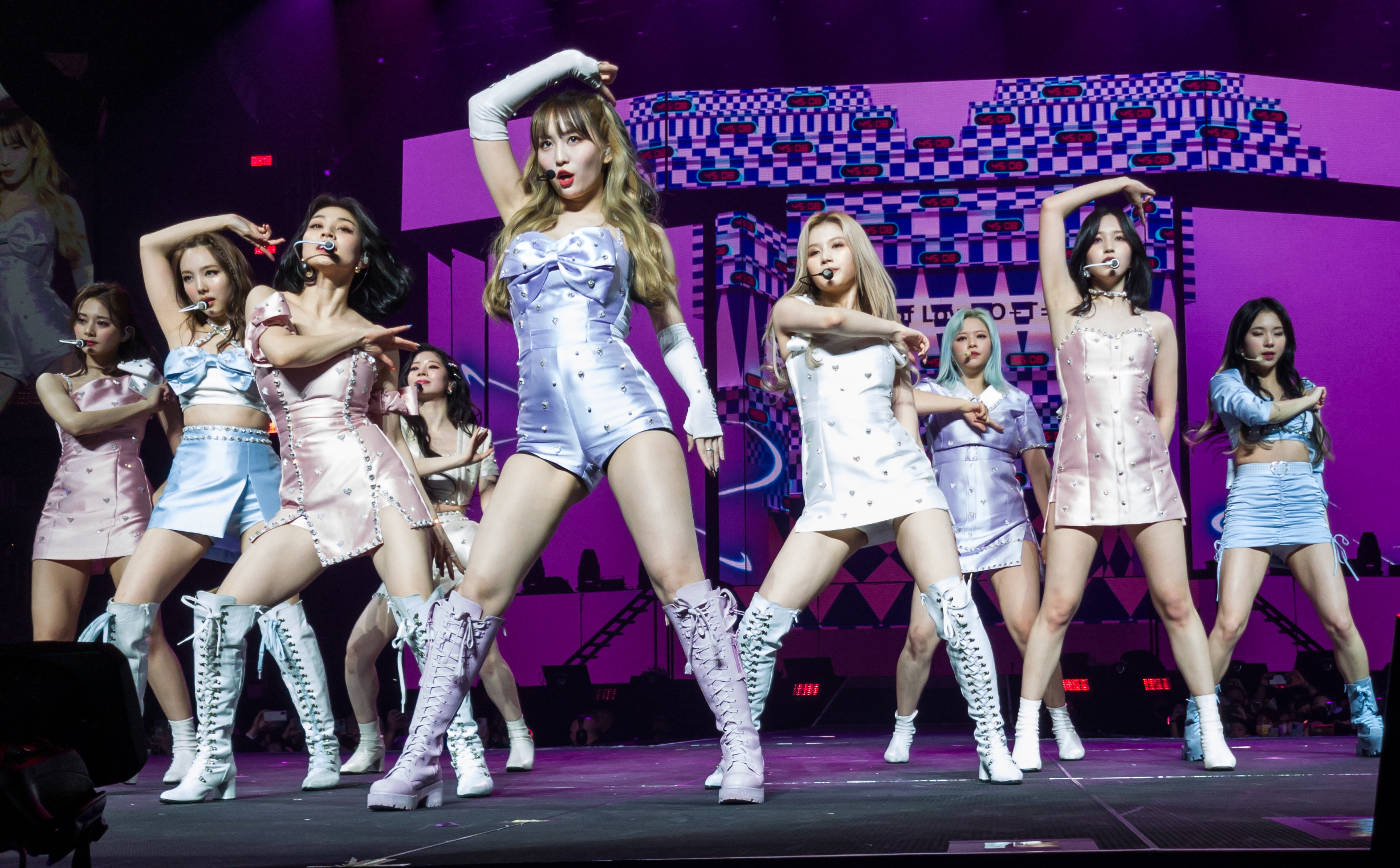
- Twice performing during their 4th World Tour "III" in February 2022.
- Concert tours: 6
- Regional tours: 2
- Online concerts: 2
- Showcases: 2

South Korean girl group Twice has performed in six concert tours, two regional tours, two online concerts, and two showcases since their debut in 2015. The group held their debut concert under the name Twice 1st Tour: Twiceland – The Opening at SK Olympic Handball Gymnasium in Seoul on February 17–19, 2017. This was followed by debut concerts in Bangkok and Singapore in April, and the tour concluded with an additional two concerts in Seoul in June. In July, they held their debut concert in Japan. They embarked on their first Japan tour in January 2018 under the name Twice Showcase Live Tour 2018 "Candy Pop".

In 2019, the Twicelights World Tour was announced, starting with a two-day concert at the KSPO Dome in May 2019. During the tour, the group ventured out of Asia for the first time, hosting four concerts in North America, three in the United States and one in Mexico. The tour was cut short in February 2020, with remaining concerts being canceled due to the COVID-19 pandemic.

Twice's fourth concert tour, "III", started with a two-day concert in Seoul in December 2021, and concluded in May 2022. The group's fifth concert tour, the Ready to Be World Tour, began in Seoul in April 2023 and concluded in July 2024. Their sixth concert tour, the This Is For World Tour, began in Incheon in July 2025 and concluded in July 2026.

== Concert tours ==
=== Twice 1st Tour: Twiceland – The Opening ===
Twice 1st Tour Twiceland – The Opening
- Asia tour by Twice
- Associated album: Twicecoaster: Lane 1 Twicecoaster: Lane 2
- Start date: February 17, 2017
- End date: June 18, 2017
- Legs: 1
- No. of shows: 5 in South Korea; 1 in Thailand; 1 in Singapore; 7 in total
- Attendance: 36,000

Twice concert chronology
- Twice 1st Tour: Twiceland – The Opening (2017); Twice Showcase Live Tour 2018 "Candy Pop" (2018)

Set list in Seoul, Bangkok and Singapore

Main Set
Opening
(VCR)

1. Touchdown
2. I'm Gonna Be a Star
3. Cheer Up

Ment 1

1. Going Crazy (미쳤나봐)
2. Truth
3. Like Ooh-Ahh (Ooh-Ahh하게)

Ment 2

1. 1 to 10
2. Tuk Tok (툭하면 톡)
3. My Headphones On (Headphone 써)

Intermission
(VCR 1)

1. 4 Minutes (Madonna cover) (Mina, Jihyo & Jeongyeon)
2. Yoncé (Beyoncé cover) (Nayeon, Momo, Sana & Chaeyoung)
3. Black Cat Nero (검은 고양이 네로) (Turbo cover) (Dahyun & Tzuyu)
4. Card Captor Sakura (카드 캡터 체리) (cover)
5. Moonlight Densetsu (from Sailor Moon - cover)
6. Ponytail

Ment 3

1. Candy Boy
2. Pit-A-Pat

Intermission
(VCR 2)

1. Next Page
2. Woohoo
3. Do It Again (다시 해줘)

Ment 4

1. Overdose (EXO cover)
2. Pretty U (Seventeen cover)

Ment 5

1. Precious Love (소중한 사랑)
2. Jelly Jelly
3. TT

Encore
Intermission
(VCR)

1. One in a Million
2. Like a Fool

Ending Ment

1. Like Ooh-Ahh (Ooh-Ahh하게)
2. Cheer Up
3. TT
Set list in Seoul (Encore)

Main Set
Opening
(VCR)

1. Touchdown
2. I'm Gonna Be a Star
3. Cheer Up

Ment 1

1. Going Crazy (미쳤나봐)
2. Only You (Only 너)
3. Like Ooh-Ahh (Ooh-Ahh하게)

Ment 2

1. 1 to 10
2. Tuk Tok (툭하면 톡)
3. My Headphones On (Headphone 써)

Intermission
(VCR 1)

1. Greedy (Ariana Grande cover) (Nayeon, Jihyo & Chaeyoung)
2. The Four Seasons (Antonio Vivaldi cover) (Mina & Momo)
3. Round and Round (빙글빙글) (Na-mi cover) (Tzuyu, Jeongyeon, Sana & Dahyun)
4. Card Captor Sakura (카드 캡터 체리) (cover)
5. Moonlight Densetsu (from Sailor Moon - cover)
6. Ponytail

Ment 3

1. Jelly Jelly
2. Knock Knock

Intermission
(VCR 2)

1. Next Page
2. Eye Eye Eyes
3. Do It Again (다시 해줘)

Ment 4

1. Someone Like Me
2. Ice Cream (녹아요)

Ment 5

1. Precious Love (소중한 사랑)
2. TT
3. Signal

Encore
Intermission
(VCR)

1. One in a Million
2. Like a Fool

Ending Ment

1. Like Ooh-Ahh (Ooh-Ahh하게)
2. Cheer Up
3. TT
Notes
- During the show in Bangkok and Singapore, "Tuk Tok" (툭하면 톡) and "Candy Boy" was removed from the original setlist and they performed "TT" instead, Twice added "Cha La La" (Maruko) to their cover song for performance after Ment 3 in Bangkok show. Twice also added "Knock Knock" for performance after Ment 5.
- During the show in Bangkok, "Truth" was removed and they performed "Like a Fool" instead. Twice also removed "One in a Million" from the setlist.
- During the show in Singapore, Twice removed "Woohoo" and "Like a Fool" from the setlist.
- After the show in Seoul, Day 3 (February 19), Twice performed "Knock Knock" (pre-premiered) hours before its release.
- Jihyo performed seated in Bangkok and Singapore due to knee injury.

Tour dates
Date	City	Country	Venue	Attendance
February 17, 2017	Seoul	South Korea	SK Olympic Handball Gymnasium	15,000
February 18, 2017	Seoul	South Korea	SK Olympic Handball Gymnasium	15,000
February 19, 2017	Seoul	South Korea	SK Olympic Handball Gymnasium	15,000
April 8, 2017	Bangkok	Thailand	Thunder Dome	4,000
April 29, 2017	Singapore		The Star Performing Arts Centre	5,000
Encore
June 17, 2017	Seoul	South Korea	Jamsil Arena	12,000
June 18, 2017	Seoul	South Korea	Jamsil Arena	12,000
Total				36,000

=== Twice 2nd Tour: Twiceland Zone 2 – Fantasy Park ===
Twice 2nd Tour Twiceland Zone 2 – Fantasy Park
- Asia tour by Twice
- Associated album: What Is Love?
- Start date: May 18, 2018
- End date: August 25, 2018
- Legs: 1
- No. of shows: 3 in South Korea; 4 in Japan; 1 in Singapore; 1 in Thailand; 1 in Indonesia; 10 in total
- Attendance: 90,000

Twice concert chronology
- Twice Showcase Live Tour 2018 "Candy Pop" (2018); Twice 2nd Tour: Twiceland Zone 2 – Fantasy Park (2018); Twice 1st Arena Tour 2018 "BDZ" (2018)

Set list in Seoul, Singapore, Bangkok and Jakarta

Main Set
Opening
(VCR)

1. You in My Heart (널 내게 담아)

(VCR 1)

1. Like Ooh-Ahh (Ooh-Ahh하게) (remix)
2. Ponytail
3. Cheer Up (remix)

Ment 1

1. Hold Me Tight
2. Likey (remix)
3. Look at Me (날 바라바라봐)

Ment 2

1. Someone Like Me
2. Turtle (거북이)
3. Stuck

Intermission
(VCR 2)

1. Touchdown
2. Signal (remix)
3. Valenti (BoA cover)
4. Rainism (Rain cover) (Dahyun)
5. End of Time (Beyoncé cover) (Jihyo, Momo & Tzuyu)
6. My Ear's Candy (내귀에 캔디) (Baek Ji-young feat. Ok Taec-yeon cover) (Nayeon & Jeongyeon)
7. Oppa (오빠) (Wax cover) (Sana, Chaeyoung & Mina)
8. Knock Knock (remix)

Ment 3

1. Sweet Talker
2. What Is Love?

Intermission
(VCR 3)

1. Missing U
2. Only You (Only 너)
3. Really Really (Winner cover)

Ment 4

1. FFW
2. TT
3. Heart Shaker

Encore

1. One in a Million
2. What Is Love? (Acoustic version)

Ending Ment
(Medley)

1. Like Ooh-Ahh (Ooh-Ahh하게)
2. Cheer Up
3. TT
4. Knock Knock
5. Signal
6. Likey
7. Heart Shaker
8. What Is Love?
Set list in Japan

Main Set
Opening
(VCR)

1. You in My Heart (널 내게 담아)

(VCR 1)

1. Like Ooh-Ahh (Ooh-Ahh하게) (remix)
2. Cheer Up (remix)

Ment 1

1. Turtle (거북이)
2. Likey (remix)
3. Brand New Girl
4. One More Time

Intermission
(VCR 2)

1. Touchdown
2. Signal (remix)
3. Valenti (BoA cover)
4. Rainism (Rain cover) (Dahyun)
5. End of Time (Beyoncé cover) (Jihyo, Momo & Tzuyu)
6. My Ear's Candy (내귀에 캔디) (Baek Ji-young feat. Ok Taec-yeon cover) (Nayeon & Jeongyeon)
7. Oppa (오빠) (Wax cover) (Sana, Chaeyoung & Mina)

Ment 2

1. Wake Me Up
2. Knock Knock (remix)
3. What Is Love?

Intermission
(VCR 3)

1. Missing U
2. Only You (Only 너)

Ment 3

1. Candy Pop
2. TT (Japanese version)
3. Heart Shaker

Encore

1. One in a Million
2. What Is Love? (Acoustic version)

Ending Ment
(Medley)

1. Like Ooh-Ahh (Ooh-Ahh하게)
2. Cheer Up
3. TT
4. Knock Knock
5. Signal
6. Likey
7. Heart Shaker
8. What Is Love?
Notes
- During the show in Bangkok and Jakarta, Twice removed "FFW" and added "Dance the Night Away" to the performance after Ment 4.

Tour dates
Date	City	Country	Venue	Attendance
May 18, 2018	Seoul	South Korea	Jamsil Arena	18,000
May 19, 2018	Seoul	South Korea	Jamsil Arena	18,000
May 20, 2018	Seoul	South Korea	Jamsil Arena	18,000
May 26, 2018	Saitama	Japan	Saitama Super Arena	36,000
May 27, 2018	Saitama	Japan	Saitama Super Arena	36,000
June 2, 2018	Osaka	Japan	Osaka-jō Hall	20,000
June 3, 2018	Osaka	Japan	Osaka-jō Hall	20,000
June 17, 2018	Singapore		Singapore Indoor Stadium	8,500
August 18, 2018	Bangkok	Thailand	Thunder Dome	—
August 25, 2018	Jakarta	Indonesia	Indonesia Convention Exhibition	—
Total				90,000

Cancelled dates
Date	City	Country	Venue	Reason
July 28, 2018	Kuala Lumpur	Malaysia	Malawati Stadium	Safety issues

== Regional tours ==
=== Twice 1st Arena Tour 2018 "BDZ" ===
Twice 1st Arena Tour 2018 "BDZ"
- Japan tour by Twice
- Associated album: BDZ
- Start date: September 29, 2018
- End date: October 17, 2018
- Legs: 1
- No. of shows: 1 in Chiba; 2 in Nagoya; 3 in Kobe; 2 in Tokyo; 8 in total
- Attendance: 70,000

Twice concert chronology
- Twice 2nd Tour: Twiceland Zone 2 – Fantasy Park (2018); Twice 1st Arena Tour 2018 "BDZ" (2018); Twice Dome Tour 2019 "#Dreamday" (2019)

Set list

Opening
(VCR)

1. Wake Me Up
2. I'm Gonna Be a Star
3. Say It Again
4. What Is Love?

Ment 1

1. Signal (Japanese version) (remix)
2. Luv Me
3. One More Time

Ment 2

1. BDZ

(VCR 1)

1. Pink Lemonade
2. L.O.V.E
3. Likey (remix)

Ment 3

1. Be as One
2. Stay by My Side

Ment 4

1. Cheer Up (Japanese version) (remix)
2. Candy Pop
3. Brand New Girl
4. Dance the Night Away (remix)

(VCR 2)

1. Wishing

Ending Ment

1. Knock Knock (Japanese version)
2. TT (Japanese version)
3. I Want You Back

Tour dates
Date	City	Country	Venue	Attendance
September 29, 2018	Chiba	Japan	Makuhari Messe	70,000
October 2, 2018	Nagoya	Japan	Nippon Gaishi Hall	70,000
October 3, 2018	Nagoya	Japan	Nippon Gaishi Hall	70,000
October 12, 2018	Kobe	Japan	World Memorial Hall	70,000
October 13, 2018	Kobe	Japan	World Memorial Hall	70,000
October 14, 2018	Kobe	Japan	World Memorial Hall	70,000
October 16, 2018	Tokyo	Japan	Musashino Forest Sports Plaza	70,000
October 17, 2018	Tokyo	Japan	Musashino Forest Sports Plaza	70,000

Cancelled dates
Date	City	Country	Venue	Reason
September 30, 2018	Chiba	Japan	Makuhari Messe	Typhoon Trami

=== Twice Dome Tour 2019 "#Dreamday" ===
Twice Dome Tour 2019 "#Dreamday"
- Japan tour by Twice
- Associated album: #Twice2
- Start date: March 20, 2019
- End date: April 6, 2019
- Legs: 1
- No. of shows: 2 in Osaka; 2 in Tokyo; 1 in Nagoya; 5 in total
- Attendance: 220,000

Twice concert chronology
- Twice 1st Arena Tour 2018 "BDZ" (2018); Twice Dome Tour 2019 "#Dreamday" (2019); Twicelights World Tour (2019–2020)

Set list

Opening
(VCR)

1. One More Time (remix)
2. Luv Me
3. Like Ooh-Ahh (Japanese version)

Ment 1

1. Brand New Girl
2. Signal (Japanese version)

(VCR 1)

1. Candy Pop
2. TT (Japanese version) (remix)
3. Wake Me Up (Dance break version)

Ment 2

1. Cheer Up (Japanese version)
2. Pink Lemonade
3. I Want You Back
4. What Is Love? (Japanese version)

(VCR 2)

1. BDZ
2. L.O.V.E
3. Sweet Talker
4. Say It Again

Ment 3

1. The Best Thing I Ever Did (올해 제일 잘한 일)
2. Only You (Only 너) (Acoustic remix)
3. Stay by My Side

Ment 4

1. Heart Shaker (Japanese version)

Ment 5

1. Knock Knock (Japanese version)
2. Likey (Japanese version)
3. Dance the Night Away (Japanese version) (remix)

(VCR 3)

1. Be as One
2. Wishing

Ending Ment
(Medley)

1. One More Time
2. Candy Pop
3. Wake Me Up
4. BDZ
5. Yes or Yes (Japanese version)

Tour dates
Date	City	Country	Venue	Attendance
March 20, 2019	Osaka	Japan	Kyocera Dome Osaka	220,000
March 21, 2019	Osaka	Japan	Kyocera Dome Osaka	220,000
March 29, 2019	Tokyo	Japan	Tokyo Dome	220,000
March 30, 2019	Tokyo	Japan	Tokyo Dome	220,000
April 6, 2019	Nagoya	Japan	Nagoya Dome	220,000

== Showcases ==
=== Twice Debut Showcase "Touchdown in Japan" ===
Twice Debut Showcase "Touchdown in Japan"
- Japan concert by Twice
- Associated album: #Twice
- Date: July 2, 2017
- No. of shows: 2
- Attendance: 15,000

Set list

Opening
(VCR)

1. Touchdown
2. Like Ooh-Ahh (Japanese version)
3. Cheer Up (Japanese version)

Ment 1

1. Jelly Jelly
2. Knock Knock (Japanese version)

(VCR)

1. One in a Million

Ment 2

1. Signal (Japanese version)
2. TT (Japanese version)

Encore
(Korean version medley)

1. Like Ooh-Ahh (Ooh-Ahh하게)
2. Cheer Up
3. TT
4. Knock Knock
5. Signal

Tour dates
Date	City	Country	Venue	Attendance
July 2, 2017 (Two shows)	Tokyo	Japan	Tokyo Metropolitan Gymnasium	15,000

=== Twice Showcase Live Tour 2018 "Candy Pop" ===
Twice Showcase Live Tour 2018 "Candy Pop"
- Japan tour by Twice
- Start date: January 19, 2018
- End date: February 1, 2018
- Legs: 1
- No. of shows: 1 in Seto; 1 in Fukuoka; 1 in Hiroshima; 2 in Osaka; 1 in Tokyo; 2 in Saitama; 8 in total
- Attendance: 20,000

Twice concert chronology
- Twice 1st Tour: Twiceland – The Opening (2017); Twice Showcase Live Tour 2018 "Candy Pop" (2018); Twice 2nd Tour: Twiceland Zone 2 – Fantasy Park (2018)

Set list

Opening
(VCR)

1. One More Time
2. Like Ooh-Ahh (Japanese version)
3. Touchdown

Ment

1. Luv Me
2. Heart Shaker
3. Cheer Up (Japanese version)

(Brand New Girl PV)

1. Candy Pop
2. Signal (Japanese version)

(Candy corner)

1. Likey
2. Knock Knock (Japanese version)
3. TT (Japanese version)
4. One in a Million

Ending Ment

1. Brand New Girl

Tour dates
Date	City	Country	Venue	Attendance
January 19, 2018	Seto	Japan	Seto City Cultural Center	20,000
January 22, 2018	Fukuoka	Japan	Fukuoka Sun Palace	20,000
January 23, 2018	Hiroshima	Japan	Ueno Gakuen Hall	20,000
January 25, 2018	Osaka	Japan	Grand Cube Osaka	20,000
January 26, 2018	Osaka	Japan	Grand Cube Osaka	20,000
January 29, 2018	Tokyo	Japan	NHK Hall	20,000
January 31, 2018	Saitama	Japan	Sonic City	20,000
February 1, 2018	Saitama	Japan	Sonic City	20,000

== Online concerts ==
=== Beyond Live – "Twice: World in a Day" ===
Twice: World in a Day
- Korean concert by Twice
- Associated album: Feel Special; More & More
- Date: August 9, 2020

Twice concert chronology
- Twicelights World Tour (2019–2020); Beyond Live – "Twice: World in a Day" (2020); NTT Docomo Connect Special Live – Twice in Wonderland (2021)

On August 9, 2020, Twice held their first online concert titled "Twice: World in a Day" in response to their "Twicelights World Tour Finale" which had been canceled earlier in the year. The group worked with the Beyond Live platform launched by SM Entertainment and Naver for the concert, becoming the first artist outside of SM Entertainment to host an online concert using the platform.

A replay VOD of the concert was uploaded on October 30 and multicam VODs were uploaded on November 30.

Setlist

Opening (VCR)

1. Stuck in My Head (Rock Version) (Multicam OFF)
2. Touchdown (Rock Version) (Multicam OFF)
3. Fancy (Rock Version) (Multicam ON)

Ment 1

1. Heart Shaker (Remix) (Multicam OFF)
2. Love Foolish (Multicam ON)

Ment 2

1. TT (Multicam OFF)
2. What Is Love? (Multicam ON)
3. Yes or Yes? (Multicam OFF)

(VCR)

1. Shadow (Multicam OFF)
2. Firework (Multicam ON)

Ment 3

1. Feel Special (Multicam OFF)
2. More & More (Multicam OFF)

Ending Ment

1. 21:29 (Multicam OFF)
2. Turn It Up (Multicam ON)
3. Cheer Up (Multicam OFF)
Exclusive Surprise Live, not included in VOD Service

==== Accolades ====
Awards and nominations for Twice: World in a Day
Year	Organization	Award	Result	Ref.
2021	Edaily Culture Awards (Note: The Edaily Culture Awards are a South Korean award ceremony established in 2013 to honor the year's best achievements in six categories: theatre, classical, dance, Korean music, musicals and concerts. Winners are selected by a panel of 54 judges who are professionals in each field.)	Best Concert Award	Won	

=== NTT Docomo Connect Special Live – Twice in Wonderland ===
Twice in Wonderland
- Japan concert by Twice
- Associated album: #Twice3; Eyes Wide Open
- Date: March 6, 2021

Twice concert chronology
- Beyond LIVE - "Twice: World in a Day" (2020); NTT Docomo Connect Special Live - Twice in Wonderland (2021); Twice 4th World Tour "III" (2021-2022)

On March 6, 2021, the group held their second online concert titled "Twice in Wonderland", which was first announced on January 14. The concert was held in partnership with NTT Docomo and was broadcast using augmented reality and mixed reality technologies. At the end of their online concert, Twice announced the release of the Japanese single "Kura Kura", which was released on May 12.

Set list

Opening (VCR)

1. Fanfare
2. More & More (Japanese ver.)

Ment 1

1. Dance the Night Away (Japanese ver.)
2. Happy Happy
3. Brand New Girl

Ment 2

1. Breakthrough
2. Fancy (Japanese ver.)
3. Fake & True

Ment 3

1. TT (Japanese ver.)
2. Heart Shaker (Japanese ver.)
3. I Can't Stop Me
4. Better

Ment 4
ONCE's Choice

1. Feel Special (Japanese ver.)

(VCR)

1. Polish
2. Pink Lemonade

Ending Ment

1. The Reason Why

(Japanese Title Track Medley)

1. One More Time
2. Candy Pop
3. Wake Me Up

FC ONCE Japan Limited Video (Bonus)

1. What Is Love? (Japanese ver.)
