= BDZ =

BDZ may refer to:

- BDZ (album), 2018, by Twice
  - "BDZ" (song)
- Benzodiazepines, a class of drugs
- Bulgarian State Railways (Bulgarian: Balgarski Darzhavni Zheleznitsi)
- Badeshi (ISO 639-3:bdz), spoken in Pakistan
