= Twice 4th World Tour III =

2021–2022 concert tour by Twice

Twice 4th World Tour "III"
- World tour by Twice
- Official poster
- Associated album: Formula of Love: O+T=<3
- Start date: December 25, 2021
- End date: May 15, 2022
- Legs: 4
- No. of shows: 14

Twice concert chronology
- Twice in Wonderland (2021); Twice 4th World Tour "III" (2021–2022); Twice 5th World Tour "Ready to Be" (2023–2024)

Twice 4th World Tour "III" (stylized in all caps), or simply, III (read as "three"), was the second worldwide concert tour and the fourth overall concert headlined by South Korean girl group Twice, in support of their third Korean studio album, Formula of Love: O+T=<3 (2021). The tour began on December 25, 2021, at the Olympic Gymnastics Arena in Seoul, and concluded on May 15, 2022, at the Banc of California Stadium in Los Angeles, comprising 14 shows.

== Background ==
On October 1, 2021, an unnamed upcoming world tour was announced through the music video of "The Feels", the group's first English-language single. The name of the tour, Twice 4th World Tour "III", was revealed on November 15, with the initial 8 tour dates being announced on the same day. Additional concerts in Los Angeles and New York were added not long after due to overwhelming demand. On December 16, JYP Entertainment announced that the first concert in Seoul that was scheduled to take place on Christmas Eve was canceled due to COVID-19 restrictions and venue operating hours restrictions. They also announced that Jeongyeon would not participate in the Seoul concerts due to health issues.

The second concert in Seoul on December 26 was broadcast live on Beyond Live (V Live+). After the concert, two tour dates at Japan's Tokyo Dome were announced, making it Twice's second time performing at the stadium since their 2019 Japan Dome tour named "#Dream Day". A third Tokyo Dome tour date was announced on March 7, 2022. On March 30, it was announced that Twice would return to Los Angeles for an encore performance at Banc of California Stadium. A second date was added after tickets sold out in one day.

== Commercial performance ==
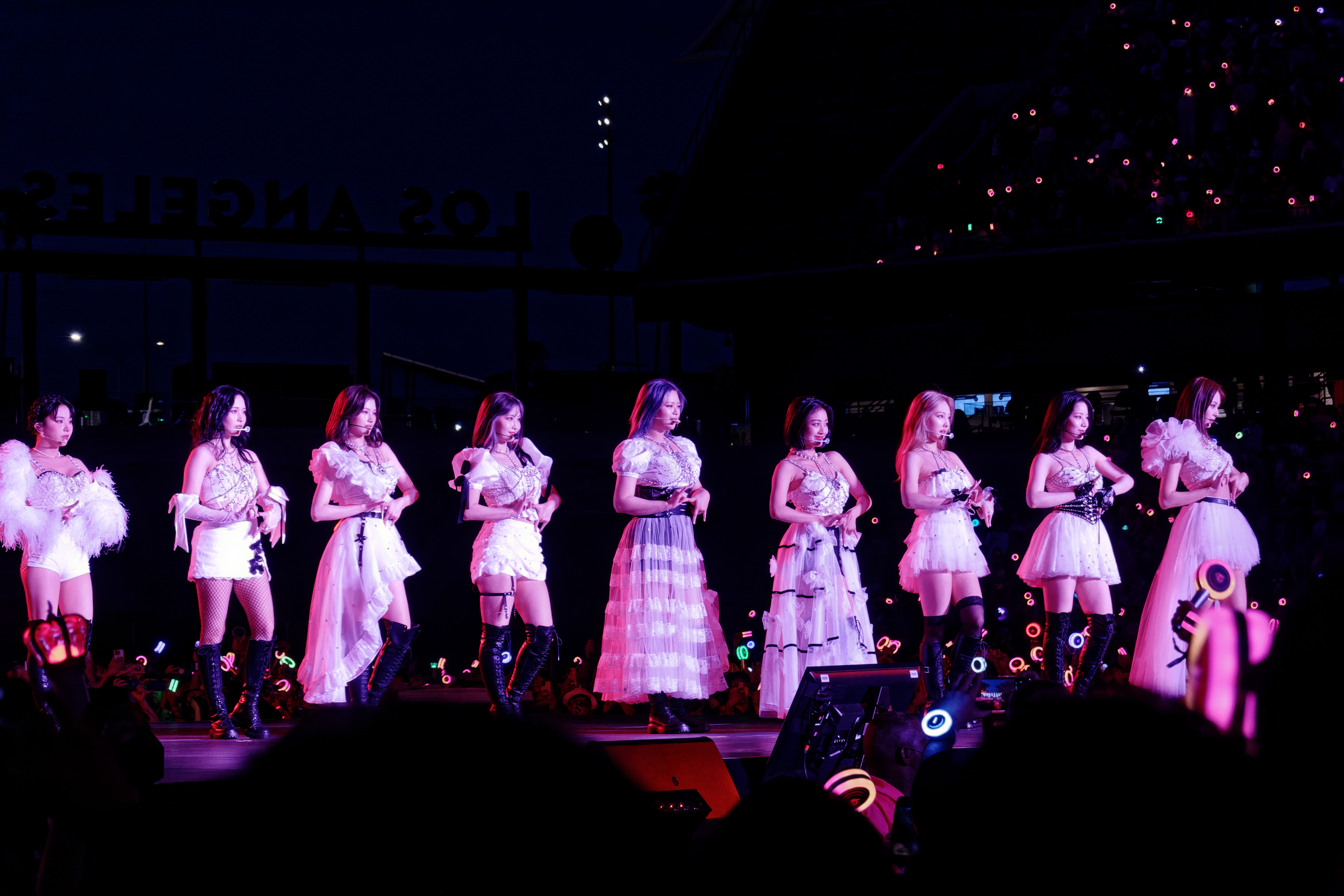
Twice performing "Fancy" at Banc of California Stadium on May 14, 2022

The tour debuted at number nine on the February 2022 issue of Billboard's Top Tours Boxscore chart with a total gross of US$11,175,207 and a total attendance of 76,762, from 6 shows.

=== Venue records ===
The arena North American leg of the tour wrapped up with an attendance of slightly over 100,000 attendees, making them the first girl group to achieve this attendance milestone, and joining BTS as the only K-Pop act to garner over 100k tickets sold on their North American tour. With the success of the tour, the 9-member group made history by announcing an encore stadium date in Los Angeles, with another being added shortly after the initial announcement. This makes Twice the first-ever K-pop girl group to hold stadium shows in North America, proving their global success. The Tokyo Dome concerts made Twice the first foreign female act to perform three consecutive nights at the stadium and the second female act to do so after the Japanese girl group AKB48.

== Set lists ==
Set list in Seoul

Main set

1. "Opening VCR 1
2. "The Feels"
3. "Feel Special"
4. "Up No More"
5. "Ment 1"
6. "Queen"
7. "Fancy"
8. "Turn It Up"
9. "VCR 2"
10. "Shot Clock"
11. "Get Loud"
12. "I Can't Stop Me"
13. "Ment 2"
14. "Espresso"
15. "Icon"
16. "Cry for Me"
17. "VCR 3"
18. "Scientist"
19. "Real You"
20. "Moonlight"
21. "Ment 3"
22. "Cactus" (선인장)
23. "Rewind" (알고 싶지 않아)
24. "Ment 4"
25. "What Is Love?"
26. "Knock Knock"
27. "More & More"
28. "Ment 5"
29. "Dance the Night Away" (remix)
30. "Alcohol-Free"
31. "Heart Shaker"
32. "VCR 4"
33. "Push & Pull" (Jihyo, Sana & Dahyun)
34. "Hello" (Nayeon, Momo & Chaeyoung)
35. "1, 3, 2" (Mina & Tzuyu)

Encore

1. "VCR 5"
2. "The Best Thing I Ever Did" (올해 제일 잘한 일) (Christmas remix)
3. "Merry & Happy"

December 25 (Day 1)

1. "TT" (TAK remix)
2. "Oxygen"

December 26 (Day 2)

1. "Baby Blue Love"
2. "TT" (TAK remix)
3. "I Love You More Than Anyone" (누구보다 널 사랑해)
4. "Rollin'"
5. "Say You Love Me"
6. "Do It Again" (다시 해줘)
7. "Precious Love" (소중한 사랑)
Set list in the US

Main set

1. "Opening VCR 1
2. "The Feels"
3. "Feel Special"
4. "Up No More"
5. "Ment 1"
6. "Queen"
7. "Fancy"
8. "Turn It Up"
9. "VCR 2"
10. "Shot Clock"
11. "Get Loud"
12. "I Can't Stop Me"
13. "Ment 2"
14. "Espresso"
15. "Icon"
16. "Cry for Me"
17. "VCR 3"
18. "Scientist"
19. "Real You"
20. "Moonlight"
21. "Ment 3"
22. "Cactus" (선인장)
23. "Rewind" (알고 싶지 않아)
24. "Ment 4"
25. "What Is Love?"
26. "Knock Knock"
27. "More & More"
28. "Ment 5"
29. "Dance the Night Away" (remix)
30. "Alcohol-Free"
31. "Heart Shaker"
32. "VCR 4"
33. "Push & Pull" (Jihyo, Sana & Dahyun)
34. "Hello" (Nayeon, Momo & Chaeyoung)
35. "1, 3, 2" (Jeongyeon, Mina & Tzuyu) (Extended)

Encore

1. "VCR 5"
2. "Candy"
3. "Likey"

February 15 – Los Angeles (Day 1)

1. "TT" (TAK remix)
2. "Cheer Up"
3. "Likey"

February 16 – Los Angeles (Day 2)

1. "Yes or Yes?"
2. "Signal"

February 18 – Oakland

1. "Believer"
2. "Rollin'"
3. "BDZ" (Korean ver.)
4. "TT"

February 22 – Fort Worth

1. "Cheer Up"
2. "BDZ" (Korean ver.)
3. "Love Foolish"
4. "SOS"
5. "Signal"

February 24 – Atlanta

1. "TT"
2. "SOS"
3. "Last Waltz"

February 26 – New York (Day 1)

1. "TT"
2. "Firework"
3. "Yes or Yes?"
4. "Like Ooh-Ahh" (Ooh-Ahh하게)
5. "Signal"

February 27 – New York (Day 2)

1. "BDZ" (Korean ver.)
2. "Rollin'"
3. "I'm Gonna Be a Star"
4. "Love Foolish"
5. "Baby Blue Love"
6. "TT"
7. "Signal"
Set list in Tokyo

Main set

1. "Opening VCR 1
2. "The Feels"
3. "Feel Special"
4. "Up No More"
5. "Ment 1"
6. "Queen"
7. "Fancy" (Japanese ver.)
8. "Turn It Up"
9. "VCR 2"
10. "Shot Clock"
11. "Get Loud"
12. "I Can't Stop Me" (Japanese ver.)
13. "Ment 2"
14. "Espresso"
15. "Icon"
16. "Cry for Me"
17. "VCR 3"
18. "Scientist" (Japanese ver.)
19. "Real You"
20. "Moonlight"
21. "Ment 3"
22. "Cactus" (선인장)
23. "Rewind" (알고 싶지 않아)
24. "Ment 4"
25. "What Is Love?" (Japanese ver.)
26. "Knock Knock"
27. "More & More"
28. "Ment 5"
29. "Dance the Night Away" (remix)
30. "Alcohol-Free"
31. "Heart Shaker"
32. "VCR 4"
33. "Push & Pull" (Jihyo, Sana & Dahyun)
34. "Hello" (Nayeon, Momo & Chaeyoung)
35. "1, 3, 2" (Jeongyeon, Mina & Tzuyu)

Encore

1. "VCR 5"
2. "Just Be Yourself"
3. "Perfect World"

April 23 (Day 1)

1. "Candy Pop"
2. "Changing!"
3. "Good at Love"
4. "Stay By My Side"

April 24 (Day 2)

1. "Fanfare"
2. "Happy Happy"
3. "Polish"
4. "Breakthrough"

April 25 (Day 3)

1. "Happy Happy"
2. "Fake & True"
3. "Luv Me"
4. "Kura Kura"
Set list in the US (Encore)

Main set

1. "Opening VCR 1
2. "The Feels"
3. "Feel Special"
4. "Up No More"
5. "Ment 1"
6. "Queen"
7. "Fancy"
8. "Turn It Up"
9. "VCR 2"
10. "Shot Clock"
11. "Get Loud"
12. "I Can't Stop Me"
13. "Ment 2"
14. "Espresso"
15. "Icon"
16. "Cry for Me"
17. "VCR 3"
18. "Scientist"
19. "Real You"
20. "Moonlight"
21. "Ment 3"
22. "Cactus" (선인장)
23. "Rewind" (알고 싶지 않아)
24. "Ment 4"
25. "What Is Love?"
26. "Knock Knock"
27. "More & More"
28. "Ment 5"
29. "Dance the Night Away" (remix)
30. "Alcohol-Free"
31. "Heart Shaker"
32. "VCR 4"
33. "Push & Pull" (Jihyo, Sana & Dahyun)
34. "Hello" (Nayeon, Momo & Chaeyoung)
35. "1, 3, 2" (Jeongyeon, Mina & Tzuyu) (Extended Mina Dancer)

Encore

1. "VCR 5"
2. "Candy"
3. "Yes or Yes?"

May 14 (Day 1)

1. "Sunset"
2. "TT"
3. "Touchdown"
4. "Dance the Night Away"

May 15 (Day 2)

1. "TT"
2. "You in My Heart"
3. "Cheer Up"
4. "Say Something"
5. "Dance the Night Away"
Notes
- For this tour, the encore songs were decided by a roulette wheel.
- Jeongyeon did not participate at the shows in Seoul due to health issues.
- During the show in Los Angeles (Day 1), Jeongyeon left the stage after "More & More" due to fatigue, but returned at "1, 3, 2".
- During the show in Los Angeles (Day 1), Twice performed "The Feels" (Benny Benassi remix) instead of "Likey" after "Candy".
- During the show in Los Angeles (Day 2), Once presented a sentimental video compilation of Twice and sang "Candy" from the Formula of Love: O+T=<3 album after the video.
- During the encore stadium shows in Los Angeles, fireworks were set off during the final song, "Dance the Night Away".

== Tour dates ==
List of concerts, showing date, city, country, venue, attendance and revenue
Date	City	Country	Venue	Attendance	Revenue
December 25, 2021	Seoul	South Korea	KSPO Dome; Beyond Live (Note: December 26 only.)	—N/a	—N/a
December 26, 2021	Seoul	South Korea	KSPO Dome; Beyond Live	—N/a	—N/a
February 15, 2022	Inglewood	United States	The Forum	100,000	$4,438,626
February 16, 2022	Inglewood	United States	The Forum	100,000	$4,438,626
February 18, 2022	Oakland	United States	Oakland Arena	100,000	—N/a
February 22, 2022	Fort Worth	United States	Dickies Arena	100,000	—N/a
February 24, 2022	Atlanta	United States	State Farm Arena	100,000	—N/a
February 26, 2022	Elmont	United States	UBS Arena	100,000	$4,044,882
February 27, 2022	Elmont	United States	UBS Arena	100,000	$4,044,882
April 23, 2022	Tokyo	Japan	Tokyo Dome	150,000	—N/a
April 24, 2022	Tokyo	Japan	Tokyo Dome	150,000	—N/a
April 25, 2022	Tokyo	Japan	Tokyo Dome	150,000	—N/a
May 14, 2022	Los Angeles (Note: Encore shows)	United States	Banc of California Stadium	44,000	—N/a
May 15, 2022	Los Angeles	United States	Banc of California Stadium	44,000	—N/a
Total				300,000	—

=== Canceled shows ===
Date	City	Country	Venue	Reason
December 24, 2021	Seoul	South Korea	KSPO Dome	New social distancing guidelines in Seoul

== See also ==
- List of Twice concert tours
