= 2018 Mnet Asian Music Awards =

Awards ceremony

- Date: December 10, 2018 (Premiere); December 12, 2018 (Fans' Choice); December 14, 2018 (Main Show)
- Location: South Korea, Japan, Hong Kong
- Hosted by: South Korea: Jung Hae-in; Japan: Park Bo-gum; Hong Kong: Song Joong-ki
- Most awards: BTS (9)
- Website: 2018mama.com

Television/radio coverage
- Network: Mnet, across CJ E&M channels and other international networks, YouTube, Vlive
- Runtime: Korea: 150 minutes (Main event); Japan: 90 minutes (Red Carpet), 220 (Main event); Hong Kong: 90 minutes (Red Carpet), 280 (Main event)

The 2018 Mnet Asian Music Awards ceremony, organized by CJ E&M through its music channel Mnet, took place from December 10 through December 14, 2018 (dubbed as "MAMA Week") in South Korea, Japan and Hong Kong. The ceremony was the first Mnet Asian Music Awards hosted in South Korea in nine years, the 20th ceremony in the show's history, (Note: Promotion of the show was called as the 10th MAMA) and the second ceremony which took place in three locations. This was also the first ceremony broadcast worldwide online via YouTube. The three days event generated over 50 million messages sent on Twitter.

Four Grand Prizes (Daesangs) were given throughout the ceremonies; The inaugural Worldwide Icon of the Year is given alongside Album of the Year, Song of the Year and Artist of the Year.

== Shows ==
"2018 MAMA Premiere in Korea" celebrated and honored new artists in both South Korea and other parts of Asia. "2018 MAMA Fans' Choice in Japan" awarded artists in fan voted categories and also announced the first Worldwide Icon of the Year. "2018 MAMA in Hong Kong" was the main event and the show's finale. The show gave awards to the artists that made great achievements in 2018.

Event	Date	Location	Host	Venue
2018 MAMA Premiere in Korea	December 10, 2018	Seoul, South Korea	Jung Hae-in	Dongdaemun Design Plaza
2018 MAMA Fans' Choice in Japan	December 12, 2018	Saitama, Japan	Park Bo-gum	Saitama Super Arena
2018 MAMA in Hong Kong	December 14, 2018	Hong Kong	Song Joong-ki	AsiaWorld–Expo, Arena

== Criteria ==
Division	Online Voting	MAMA Professional Panel (Local + Foreign)	Music Sales	Record Sales	Social Media Voting	Global M/V View Counts	Live Social Media Voting
Artist of the Year Award Category by Artist*	20%	30%	30%	20%	—	—	—
Song of the Year Award Category by Genre**	20%	40%	30%	10%	—	—	—
Album of the Year	—	40%	—	60%	—	—	—
Special Prize***	30%	70%	—	—	—	—	—
Worldwide Icon of the Year	60%	—	—	—	20%	20%	+10%
Global Top 10 Fans' Choice	60%	—	—	—	20%	20%	—
*Best New (M)ale/(F)emale Artist, Best M/F Artist, Best M/F Group; **Best Dance Performance (Solo/M/F Group), Best Vocal Performance (M/F/Group), Best HipHop & Urban Music, Best Band Performance, Best Collaboration, Best OST; ***Best Music Video

== Winners and nominees ==
Online voting opened on the official MAMA' website, the Mwave app, TikTok, and Twitter, on November 1, 2018, one hour after nominees were announced. Voting ended on December 9, 2018.

Winners are listed first and highlighted in boldface.

=== Main Award ===
Artist of the Year (Daesang)	Song of the Year (Daesang)
**BTS**; Blackpink; Twice; Wanna One; Mamamoo	**Twice – "What Is Love?"**; Blackpink – "Ddu-Du Ddu-Du"; iKon – "Love Scenario"; Mamamoo – "Starry Night"; BTS – "Fake Love"
Album of the Year (Daesang)	Worldwide Icon of the Year (Daesang)
**BTS – Love Yourself: Tear**; Twice – What Is Love?; Wanna One – 0+1=1 (I Promise You); Red Velvet – The Perfect Red Velvet; Seventeen – You Make My Day	**BTS**; Mamamoo; Twice; Wanna One; Got7; Blackpink; Seventeen; NCT 127; NU'EST W; Monsta X
Best Male Group	Best Female Group
**Wanna One**; Got7; NCT 127; NU'EST W; BTS; Seventeen	**Twice**; Blackpink; Red Velvet; Mamamoo; Momoland; GFriend
Best Male Artist	Best Female Artist
**Roy Kim**; Dean; Park Hyo-shin; Zico; Hwang Chi-yeul	**Sunmi**; IU; Chungha; Taeyeon; Heize
Best Dance Performance – Male Group	Best Dance Performance – Female Group
**Seventeen – "Oh My!"**; Wanna One – "Boomerang"; Got7 – "Lullaby"; Monsta X – "Shoot Out"; BTS – "Fake Love"; Pentagon – "Shine"	**Twice – "What Is Love?"**; AOA – "Bingle Bangle"; Blackpink – "Ddu-Du Ddu-Du"; Red Velvet – "Bad Boy"; Lovelyz – "That Day"; Oh My Girl – "Secret Garden"
Best Dance Performance – Solo	Best Vocal Performance – Solo
**Chungha – "Roller Coaster"**; Sunmi – "Siren"; Hyuna – "Lip & Hip"; Seungri – "1, 2, 3!"; Hyolyn – "Dally (feat. GRAY)"	**Heize – "Didn't Know Me"**; Roy Kim – "Only Then"; Park Hyo-shin – "Sound of Winter"; Im Chang-jung – "There Has Never Been A Day I Haven't Loved You"; Jung Seung-hwan – "The Snowman"
Best Vocal Performance – Group	Best Unit
**iKon – "Love Scenario"**; Mamamoo – "Starry Night"; BtoB – "Only One For Me"; MeloMance – "Tale"; Bolbbalgan4 – "Travel"	**Wanna One – Triple Position – "Kangaroo"**; Exo-CBX – "Blooming Day"; Gugudan SeMiNa – "SeMiNa"; Seventeen – BSS – "Just Do It"; Girls' Generation – Oh!GG – "Lil' Touch"
Best New Artist – Male	Best New Artist – Female
**Stray Kids**; Haon; Kim Dong-han; The Boyz; Vinxen; Hyeongseop X Euiwoong	**Iz*One**; Nature; GWSN; (G)I-dle; Loona; Fromis 9
Best OST	Best Band Performance
**Seventeen – "A-Teen" (A-Teen)**; NU'EST W – "And I" (Mr. Sunshine); Roy Kim – "No Longer Mine" (Familiar Wife); Park Hyo Shin – "The Day" (Mr. Sunshine); Paul Kim – "Every Day, Every Moment" (Should We Kiss First?)	**Hyukoh – "Love Ya!"**; Day6 – "Shoot Me"; F.T. Island – "Summer Night's Dream"; Guckkasten – "Stranger"; Kiha and the Faces – "Cho Shim"
TikTok Best Music Video	Best HipHop & Urban Music
**BTS – "Idol"**; Blackpink – "Ddu-Du Ddu-Du"; Twice – "What Is Love?"; Wanna One – "Beautiful"; Shinee – "Good Evening"	**Zico – "Soulmate (feat. IU)"**; Dean – "Instagram"; Jay Park – "Soju"; Crush – "Bittersweet"; Heize – "Jenga"

=== Favorite Award ===
Worldwide Fans' Choice Top 10	Mwave Global Fans' Choice
**Mamamoo**; **Twice**; **Wanna One**; **BTS**; **Got7**; **Blackpink**; **Seventeen**; **NCT 127**; **NU'EST W**; **Monsta X**	**BTS – "Fake Love"**; Wanna One – "Beautiful"; Monsta X – "Dramarama"; JBJ – "My Flower"; Got7 – "Look"; Got7 – "Lullaby"; Exo-CBX – "Blooming Day"; Seventeen – "Oh My!"; Stray Kids – "My Pace"
Favorite Music Video	Favorite Vocal Artist
**BTS – "Idol"**; Twice – "What Is Love?"; Wanna One – "Beautiful"	**Mamamoo**; iKon; BtoB
Favorite Dance Artist (Male)	Favorite Dance Artist (Female)
**BTS**; Got7; Wanna One	**Twice**; Blackpink; Red Velvet

=== Special awards ===
Event	Category		Winner
2018 MAMA Premiere in Korea	Best New Asian Artist	Japan	**Hiragana Keyakizaka46**
2018 MAMA Premiere in Korea	Best New Asian Artist	Indonesia	**Marion Jola**
2018 MAMA Premiere in Korea	Best New Asian Artist	Mandarin	**Dean Ting**
2018 MAMA Premiere in Korea	Best New Asian Artist	Vietnam	**Orange**
2018 MAMA Premiere in Korea	Best New Asian Artist	Thailand	**The Toys**
2018 MAMA Premiere in Korea	Best Engineer of the Year		**LalellmaNino & Java Finger**
2018 MAMA Premiere in Korea	Best Composer of the Year		**Deanfluenza (Dean)**
2018 MAMA Premiere in Korea	Best Producer of the Year		**Pdogg (BTS)**
2018 MAMA Premiere in Korea	Best Choreographer of the Year		**Son Sung-deuk (BTS)**
2018 MAMA Premiere in Korea	Best Art Director of the Year		**MU:E (BTS)**
2018 MAMA Premiere in Korea	Best Video Director of the Year		**Lo Ging-zim (aMEi)**
2018 MAMA Premiere in Korea	Best Executive Producer of the Year		**Bang Si-hyuk (BTS)**
2018 MAMA Premiere in Korea	Best of Next		**(G)I-dle**
2018 MAMA Premiere in Korea	'DDP' Best Trend		**Wanna One**
2018 MAMA Fans' Choice in Japan	'Kiss Me' Style in Music		**Monsta X**
2018 MAMA Fans' Choice in Japan	Favorite Dance Artist (Japan)		**Bullet Train**
2018 MAMA in Hong Kong	New Asian Artist		**Iz*One**
2018 MAMA in Hong Kong	Best Asian Artist	Japan	**Da Pump**
2018 MAMA in Hong Kong	Best Asian Artist	Indonesia	**Afgan**
2018 MAMA in Hong Kong	Best Asian Artist	Mandarin	**JJ Lin**
2018 MAMA in Hong Kong	Best Asian Artist	Vietnam	**Hương Tràm**
2018 MAMA in Hong Kong	Best Asian Artist	Thailand	**Peck Palitchoke**
2018 MAMA in Hong Kong	Best Asian Style		**BTS**
2018 MAMA in Hong Kong	Discovery of the Year		**Momoland**
2018 MAMA in Hong Kong	'TikTok' Most Popular Artist		**Got7**
2018 MAMA in Hong Kong	Inspiration Award		**Janet Jackson**

=== Multiple awards ===
The following artist(s) received three or more awards:

Awards	Artist(s)
9	BTS
5	Twice
4	Wanna One

=== Multiple nominations ===
The following artist(s) received seven or more nominations (excluding the special awards):

Nominations	Artist(s)
11	BTS
11	Wanna One
10	Twice
8	Blackpink
8	Seventeen
7	Got7
7	Mamamoo

== Performers ==
The following individuals and groups, listed in order of appearance, performed musical numbers.

=== MAMA Premiere in Korea ===
List of performances
Name(s)	Performance(s)	Notes
Sunwoo (The Boyz) & Soyeon ((G)I-dle)	"Supermagic" (orig. by Supreme Team)	"Rookie's Challenge" (Opening Act)
Hyeongseop x Euiwoong	"I Don't Care" (orig. by 2NE1)	"Rookie's Challenge" (Opening Act)
Fromis 9 (Gyuri, Nagyung & Hayoung)	"My Type" (orig. by iKon)	"Rookie's Challenge" (Opening Act)
Stray Kids	"Like Ooh-Ahh" (orig. by Twice)	"Rookie's Challenge" (Opening Act)
Iz*One	"Energetic" (orig. by Wanna One)	"Rookie's Challenge" (Opening Act)
Loona 1/3	"Love&Live"	"Run The World"
Loona Odd Eye Circle	"Girl Front"	"Run The World"
Loona yyxy	"love4eva"	"Run The World"
Loona	"Hi High"	"Run The World"
Hiragana Keyakizaka46	"Kitaishiteinai Jibun (The Me That Doesn't Expect)"	"Run The World"
Fromis 9	"Love Bomb"	"Boys And Girls In Wonderland"
Hyeongseop x Euiwoong	"Love Tint"	"Boys And Girls In Wonderland"
Fromis 9 & Hyeongseop x Euiwoong	"DKDK", "It Will Be Good"	"Boys And Girls In Wonderland"
Dean Ting	"I Miss You"	"Best New Asian Artist Performance"
Nature	"Allegro Cantabile", "Some (You'll Be Mine)"	"Girls' Revolution"
GWSN	"Puzzle Moon"	"Girls' Revolution"
Nature & GWSN	"Outro Performance"	"Girls' Revolution"
Marion Jola	"Jangan"	"Best New Asian Artist Performance"
Iz*One	"La Vie En Rose"	"Blossom Of Love"
Kim Dong Han	"Good Night Kiss"	"From Dusk 'Til Dawn"
(G)I-dle	"Hann (Alone)", "Latata"	"From Dusk 'Til Dawn"
The Toys	"ก่อนฤดูฝน (Before Rain)"	"Best New Asian Artist Performance"
Vinxen	"Yoo Jae Suk", "Barcode", "U Don't Even Know"	"Portrait: Vinxen"
Orange	"Người Lạ Ơi (Stranger Please)"	"Best New Asian Artist Performance"
The Boyz	"Boy", "Right Here"	"New Challenger"
Stray Kids	"My Pace"	"New Challenger"
Wanna One	"Hide And Seek", "Spring Breeze"	"Eternal Moment"

=== MAMA Fans' Choice in Japan ===
List of performances
Name(s)	Performance(s)	Notes
Wanna One	"Heartbeat" (orig. by 2PM)	"Passion: MAMA's Great Moments" (Opening Act)
Stray Kids	"Overdose" + "Growl" (orig. by Exo)	"Passion: MAMA's Great Moments" (Opening Act)
Wanna One (Jaehwan & Sungwoon); Mamamoo (Solar & Wheein); Monsta X (Jooheon)	"Eyes, Nose, Lips" (orig. by Taeyang)	"Passion: MAMA's Great Moments" (Opening Act)
Iz*One	"The Boys" (orig. by Girls' Generation)	"Passion: MAMA's Great Moments" (Opening Act)
Twice (Nayeon, Momo, Sana & Mina)	"Bad Girl Good Girl" (orig. by Miss A)	"Passion: MAMA's Great Moments" (Opening Act)
Monsta X (Wonho, Kihyun, Minhyuk & IM); Got7 (JB, Yugyeom & Jinyoung)	"Fantastic Baby" (orig. by BigBang)	"Passion: MAMA's Great Moments" (Opening Act)
Iz*One (Yena & Hitomi); Twice (Momo & Mina); Monsta X (Shownu & Hyungwon); Got7 (JB & Yugyeom)	"Bounce" (orig. by Cho Yong-pil)	"Passion: MAMA's Great Moments" (Opening Act)
Stray Kids	"P.A.C.E", "Hellevator", "District 9"	"The New Champion"
Bullet Train	"Need You"	"Japan's Most Representative Dance Group"
Monsta X	"Spark" (Jooheon), "Jealousy", "Shoot Out"	"Crime And Punishment"
Iz*One	"Dance Performance", "Memory", "La Vie En Rose", "Rumor"	"Dear My Friends"
NU'EST W	"Where You At", "Dejavu", "Help Me", "Shadow"	"Before The Dawn"
Twice	"Yes or Yes", "What Is Love?", "Dance the Night Away"	"The Greatest Twice Show"
Mamamoo	"Cleopatra" (Solar), "Easy" (Wheein), "Selfish" (Moonbyul ft. Chaewon), "Don't" (Hwasa), "Egotistic", "Starry Night"	"Born To Be Mamamoo"
Wanna One	"Light", "Boomerang", "I.P.U [I Promise You]"	"Destiny"
BTS	"Fake Love", "Anpanman"	"Birth Of A Hero"

=== 2018 MAMA in Hong Kong ===
List of performances
Name(s)	Performance(s)	Notes
BTS (RM)	Opening speech	"Icarus"
Tiger JK & SVT (Vernon)	"Double Up"	"09:18" (Opening Act)
Chungha	"I Want You (Dance Remix ver.)"	"09:18" (Opening Act)
Yoon Mi-rae & Tiger JK	"Timeless" + "For The People" + "Monster"	"09:18" (Opening Act)
Yoon Mi-rae, Tiger JK & Bizzy (MFBTY)	"Mantra"	"09:18" (Opening Act)
WJSN	"Save Me, Save You"	"Girl Gone Wild"
Oh My Girl	"Remember Me"	"Girl Gone Wild"
WJSN and Oh My Girl	"Girls on Top (MAMA ver.)" (orig. by BoA)	"Girl Gone Wild"
Roy Kim	"Only Then", "The Hardest Part"	"A Lonely Goodbye"
Momoland	"BAAM", "Bboom Bboom"	"Codename: M&M"
Mommy Son & Momoland	"Boy Jump"	"Codename: M&M"
Seventeen	"Oh My!", "Flower", "Bring It", "Getting Closer"	"Episode 17"
Heize	"Jenga", "First Sight"	"Winter Is Here"
Chungha	"Roller Coaster" + "Love U"	"Winter Is Here"
Sunmi	"Addict", "Siren"	"Winter Is Here"
Iz*One	"Colors", "La Vie en Rose"	"Colorize"
Nafla x Swings	"Wu" + "Bulldozer"	"Real Recognize Real"
The Quiett x Paloalto	"Prime Time" + "Good Day"	"Real Recognize Real"
Changmo x BewhY	"Maestro" + "Forever"	"Real Recognize Real"
E SENS	"Got To Know"	"Real Recognize Real"
Got7	"Lullaby (Ballad Ver.)"	"A Beautiful Nightmare"
Yugyeom	"Fine (Remix)"	"A Beautiful Nightmare"
Jackson x BamBam x Mark	"Nightmare"	"A Beautiful Nightmare"
Got7	"Lullaby (Dark Ver.)"	"A Beautiful Nightmare"
JJ Lin	"Little Big Us", "Twilight"	"Twilight"
JJ Lin x Kim Jong-Kook	"Hate That Happiness Came"	"Twilight"
Wanna One	"Burn It Up"	"One Love"
Kang Daniel	Solo performance	"One Love"
Wanna One	"Beautiful (MAMA Ver.)", "Spring Breeze", "Energetic"	"One Love"
BTS	Intro + "Airplane Pt.2", "O!RUL8,2? Love Yourself Remix", "Idol"	"Love Yourself +"

== Presenters ==
2018 Mnet Asian Music Awards hosts

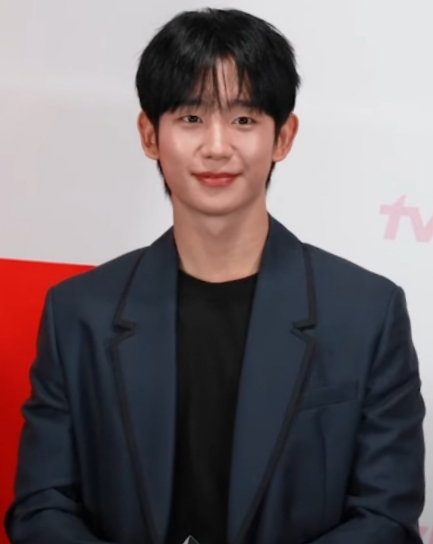
Jung Hae-in

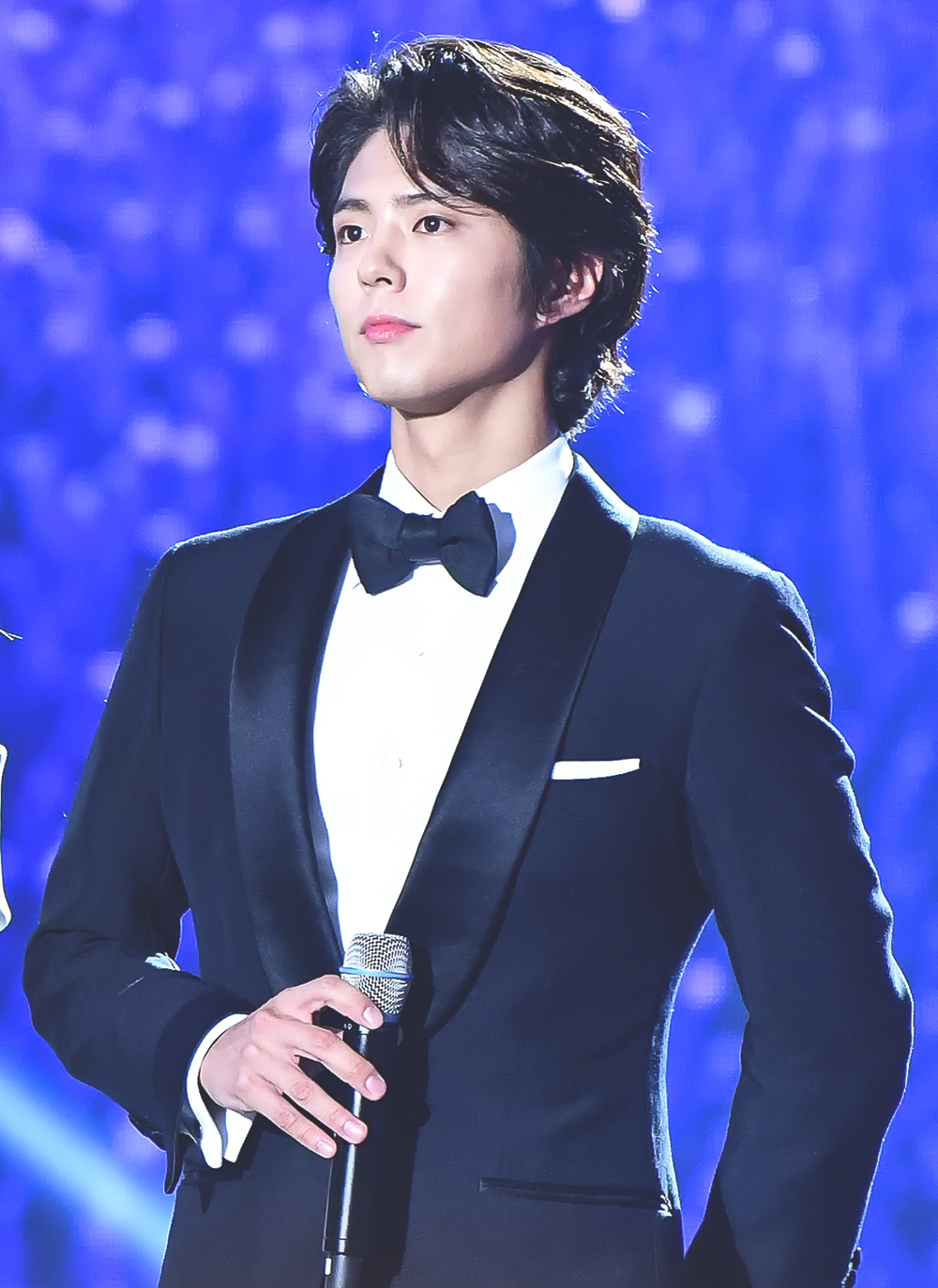
Park Bo-gum

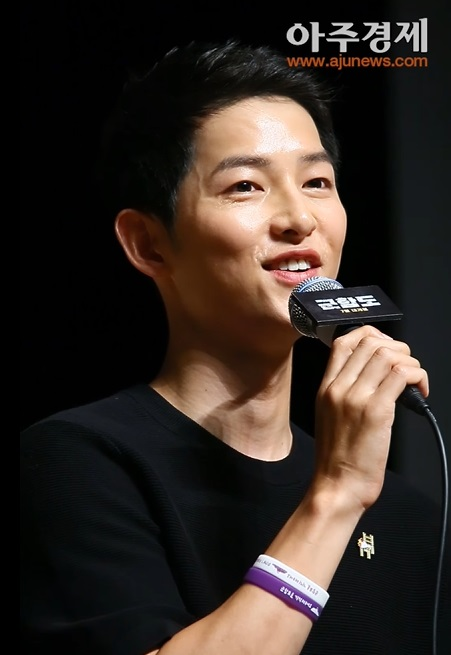
Song Joong-ki

Korea

- Jung Hae-in – main host
- Bae Yoon-young and Lee Ki-woo – presented Best New Asian Artist (Thailand & Vietnam)
- Jung Hae-in – presented Professional Categories
- Ji-soo and Jung Chae-yeon – presented Best New Asian Artist (China, Indonesia & Japan)
- Jung Hae-in – presented New Challenger Performance
- Kang Seung-hyun – presented Best of Next Award
- Kim Yu-ri and Hong Jong-hyun – presented Best New Artists
- Kim So-hyun – presented DDP Best Trend Award

Japan

- Park Bo-gum – main host
- Yoo Hyun-min and Lee Da-hee – presented Worldwide Fan Choice Award
- Minue – presented Favorite Dance Artist (Japan)
- Ha Seok-jin – presented Favorite Music Video
- Kwon Hyuk-soo – presented Worldwide Fans Choice Award
- Choi Tae-joon and Lee Sung-kyung – presented Worldwide Fan Choice Award
- Matsushige Yutaka and Shin Ah-young – presented Favorite Vocal Artist
- Yang Se-jong – presented Favorite Male Dance Artist
- Jung Il-woo and Jung So-min – presented Worldwide Fans Choice Award
- Ha Seok-jin and Choi Kang-hee – presented Favorite Female Dance Artist and Worldwide Fans Choice Award
- Jang Hyuk – presented Worldwide Icon of the Year

Hong Kong

- Song Joong-ki – main host
- Kim Dong-wook and Kim Da-mi – presented Best Unit
- Lee Yi-kyung and Moon Ga-bi – presented Best Vocal Performance Solo
- Yoon Jong-bin and Lee Sun-bin – presented Best OST
- In Gyo-jin and So Yi-hyun – presented New Asian Artist
- Kwon Hyuk-soo and Bae Jung-nam – presented Mwave Global Fan Choice
- Lee Jun-hyung and Seo Eun-su – presented Best Dance Performance – Female Group and TikTok Most Popular Artist
- Park Sung-woong – monologue
- Song Joong-ki, Jackson (Got7), Daehwi (Wanna One) and RM (BTS) – presented Janet Jackson Inspiration Award
- Park Sung-woong and Lee El – presented Best Asian Style and Discovery of the Year
- Ahn Jae-hyun & Kim Sa-rang – presented Best Male Artist & Best Dance Performance – Solo
- Lee Seung-chul and Lee Yo-won – presented Best Music Video
- Kim Jong-kook – presented Best Asian Artist (Mandarin)
- Seo Hyun-jin – presented Best Female Group
- Ahn Jae-hyun and Jung Rye-won – presented Best Dance Performance – Male Group
- Lee Jin-wook – presented Best Female Artist
- Kim Sung-ryung – presented Best Male Group
- Angelababy – presented Album of the Year
- Cha Seung-won – presented Song of the Year
- Hwang Jung-min – presented Artist of the Year

== Broadcast ==
The red carpet and ceremonies of the 2018 Mnet Asian Music Awards were broadcast worldwide via Mnet, across CJ E&M channels and other international networks and online via Mnet K-pop's YouTube account, V Live, and Mnet's official website.

Country	Network
South Korea	Mnet, OnStyle, O'live, XTM
Japan	Mnet Smart, Mnet Japan, VideoPass
United States	Mnet America, Kcon.tv
Hong Kong	ViuTV, ViuTVsix, tvN Asia
Macau	ViuTV, ViuTVsix, tvN Asia
Taiwan	ETTODAY, tvN Asia
Indonesia	JOOX, tvN Asia
Malaysia	JOOX, tvN Asia
Thailand	JOOX, tvN Asia
Philippines	Myx, KBO, tvN Asia
Cambodia	tvN Asia
Myanmar	tvN Asia
Sri Lanka	tvN Asia
Indonesia	Indosiar, Vidio, tvN Asia
Singapore	Mediacorp Toggle, tvN Asia
