= Wake Me Up (Twice song) =

2018 song by Twice

- Standard single cover

Single by Twice

from the album BDZ
- Language: Japanese
- B-side: "Pink Lemonade"
- Released: May 16, 2018
- Genre: J-pop; electropop
- Length: 3:31
- Label: Warner Music Japan
- Composers: Atsushi Shimada; Louise Frick Sveen; Albin Nordqvist
- Lyricist: Natsumi Watanabe

Twice singles chronology
"What Is Love?" (2018)	"Wake Me Up" (2018)	"Dance the Night Away" (2018)

Twice Japanese singles chronology
"Candy Pop" (2018)	"Wake Me Up" (2018)	"BDZ" (2018)

Music video
- "Wake Me Up" on YouTube

"Wake Me Up" is a song recorded by South Korean girl group Twice. It is the group's third Japanese maxi single, featuring three other tracks. The song was pre-released as a digital single on April 25, 2018, and the CD single was released on May 16 by Warner Music Japan.

The single surpassed 200,000 sales in its first week, making Twice the first foreign artist in Japan to achieve this for three consecutive releases. It exceeded 500,000 shipments by May 28 and became the first single by a foreign female artist to be certified Double Platinum by the Recording Industry Association of Japan (RIAJ).

== Background and release ==
On April 1, 2018, Twice announced the release of their third Japanese single titled "Wake Me Up", along with the news that Twice would appear in a television commercial for ABC-Mart and Nike Air Max. The commercial, featuring "Wake Me Up", began airing nationwide in Japan on April 5. The full song was first revealed on Tokyo FM's School of Lock! on April 24 and it was pre-released as a digital single on various online music portals the next day. The full music video was also released online on April 25.

== Composition ==
"Wake Me Up" was composed by Atsushi Shimada, Louise Frick Sveen, and Albin Nordqvist, with lyrics written by Natsumi Watanabe. It was described as an upbeat dance song that "encourages people not to give up and keep going forward".

== Music video ==
The full music video of "Wake Me Up" was uploaded online on April 24, 2018. It was directed by Jimmy of BS Pictures, the same team that produced Twice's previous music videos, "TT (Japanese ver.)" and "Brand New Girl". The music video ranked at No. 10 on 2018 YouTube's Top Trend Music Video in Japan, the third group's song on the list.

== Promotion ==
"Wake Me Up" was first performed on Music Station on May 25, 2018. It was also performed during Twice 2nd Tour: Twiceland Zone 2 – Fantasy Park in Saitama and Osaka. On August 3, it was performed on a Music Station 2-hour special episode.

== Commercial performance ==
The CD single debuted atop the daily ranking of the Oricon Singles Chart with 129,275 units sold on its release day, breaking Twice's record of the highest first day sales for Korean girl groups in Japan. It topped the weekly Oricon Singles Chart with 262,658 copies sold, while debuted at number 14 with 5,939 downloads on the Oricon Digital Singles Chart. It also topped the Billboard Japan Hot 100, recording 299,195 unit sales from May 14 to May 20, 2018. It was Twice's third consecutive release to surpass 200,000 sales in its first week, making the group the first foreign artist in Japan to achieve this.

It was also reported that "Wake Me Up" sold 471,438 copies in pre-orders, and it exceeded 500,000 shipments by May 28. On June 8, it became the first single by a foreign female artist to be certified Double Platinum by the RIAJ.

== Track listing ==
Digital download EP
No.	Title	Lyrics	Music	Arrangement	Length
1.	"Wake Me Up"	Natsumi Watanabe	Atsushi Shimada; Louise Frick Sveen; Albin Nordqvist	Atsushi Shimada	3:31
2.	"Pink Lemonade"	Lauren Kaori; Yu-ki Kokubo	Lauren Kaori; Kohei Yokono	Kohei Yokono	3:40
3.	"Wake Me Up" (Instrumental)		Atsushi Shimada; Louise Frick Sveen; Albin Nordqvist	Atsushi Shimada	3:31
4.	"Pink Lemonade" (Instrumental)		Lauren Kaori; Kohei Yokono	Kohei Yokono	3:40
Total length:					14:22

First press limited edition A DVD
No.	Title	Length
1.	"Wake Me Up" (Music video)
2.	"Wake Me Up" (Music video making movie)

First press limited edition B DVD
No.	Title	Length
1.	"Brand New Girl" (Music video)
2.	"Brand New Girl" (Music video making movie)
3.	"Jacket shooting making movie"

== Content production ==
Credits adapted from CD single liner notes.

=== Locations ===
Recording

- JYPE Studios, Seoul, South Korea

Mixing

- Mirrorball Studios, North Hollywood, California ("Wake Me Up")
- I to I Communications, Tokyo, Japan ("Pink Lemonade")

Mastering

- Sterling Sound, New York City, New York

=== Personnel ===
JYP Entertainment staff

- Song Ji-eun "Shannen" (JYP Entertainment Japan) – executive producer
- Jimmy Jeong (JYP Entertainment) – executive producer
- Cho Hae-sung (JYP Entertainment) – executive producer
- J. Y. Park "The Asiansoul" – producer
- Park Nam-yong (JYP Entertainment) – performance director
- Kim Hyung-woong (JYP Entertainment) – performance director
- Yun Hee-so (JYP Entertainment) – performance director
- Na Tae-hoon (JYP Entertainment) – performance director
- Yoo Kwang-yeol (JYP Entertainment) – performance director
- Kang Da-sol (JYP Entertainment) – performance director
- Lee Tae-sub (JYP Entertainment) – recording engineer
- Choi Hye-jin (JYP Entertainment) – recording engineer
- Eom Se-hee (JYP Entertainment) – recording engineer
- Lim Hong-jin (JYP Entertainment) – recording engineer
- Jang Han-soo (JYP Entertainment) – recording engineer

Warner Music Japan staff

- Kaz Kobayashi – executive producer
- Hayato Kajino – supervisor
- Rie Sawaoka – supervisor
- Naoki Takami – digital planning and marketing
- Masayo Kuroda – product coordination

Japanese recording staff

- Goei Ito (Obelisk) – music director
- Yu-ki Kokubo (Obelisk) – recording director
- Satoshi Sasamoto – Pro Tools operation

Design staff

- Toshiyuki Suzuki (United Lounge Tokyo) – art direction
- Yasuhiro Ueda (United Lounge Tokyo) – design
- Tommy – photography
- Choi Hee-sun (F. Choi) – style director
- Seo Ji-eun (F. Choi) – style director
- Lee Ga-young (F. Choi) – style director
- Lee Jin-young (F. Choi) – assistant stylist
- Jeong In-yung (F. Choi) – assistant stylist
- Park Soo-young (F. Choi) – assistant stylist
- Park Jin-hee (F. Choi) – assistant stylist
- Han Jin-joo (F. Choi) – assistant stylist
- Jung Nan-young (Lulu Hair Makeup Studio) – hair director
- Choi Ji-young (Lulu Hair Makeup Studio) – hair director
- Son Eun-hee (Lulu Hair Makeup Studio) – hair director
- Jo Sang-ki (Lulu Hair Makeup Studio) – makeup director
- Jeon Dallae (Lulu Hair Makeup Studio) – makeup director
- Zia (Lulu Hair Makeup Studio) – makeup director
- Won Jung-yo (Bit&Boot) – makeup director
- Choi Su-ji (Bit&Boot) – assistant makeup director

Movie staff

- Jimmy (BS Pictures) – music video director
- Han Gui-taek – music video making and jacket shooting making movie director
- Yu Yamaguchi (Warner Music Mastering) – DVD authoring

Other personnel

- Atsushi Shimada – all instruments (on "Wake Me Up")
- Kohei Yokono – all instruments (on "Pink Lemonade")
- Twice – background vocals
- Ikuko Tsutsumi – background vocals
- Tony Maserati – mixing engineer (on "Wake Me Up")
- Naoki Yamada – mixing engineer (on "Pink Lemonade")
- Chris Gehringer – mastering engineer

== Charts ==
=== Weekly charts ===
Weekly chart performance for "Wake Me Up"
Chart (2018)	Peak position
Japan (Japan Hot 100)	1
Japan (Oricon)	1
Japan Digital Singles (Oricon)	14

=== Year-end charts ===
Year-end chart performance for "Wake Me Up"
Chart (2018)	Position
Japan (Japan Hot 100)	18
Japan (Oricon)	19

== Certifications ==
Certifications for "Wake Me Up"
Region	Certification	Certified units/sales
Japan (RIAJ)	2× Platinum	500,000^{^}
^{^} Shipments figures based on certification alone.

== Accolades ==
Accolades for "Wake Me Up"
Year	Award	Category	Result	Ref.
2018	60th Japan Record Awards	Grand Prix	Nominated	
2018	60th Japan Record Awards	Best Song Award	Won	
