= What Is Love? (EP) =

2018 extended play by Twice

- Digital cover

EP by Twice
- Released: April 9, 2018
- Studios: JYPE Studios (Seoul, South Korea)
- Genres: K-pop; bubblegum pop; dance
- Length: 16:29 (digital version); 20:06 (physical version)
- Languages: Korean; English
- Label: JYP
- Producer: J.Y. Park "The Asiansoul"

Twice chronology
Merry & Happy (2017)	What Is Love? (2018)	Summer Nights (2018)

Singles from What Is Love?
- 1. "What Is Love?" Released: April 9, 2018

What Is Love? is the fifth extended play by South Korean girl group Twice. It was released on April 9, 2018, by JYP Entertainment. It includes the title track of the same name produced by Park Jin-young. Twice members Jeongyeon, Chaeyoung, and Jihyo also took part in writing lyrics for two songs on the EP.

Composed of six tracks overall, the EP received positive ratings from several music critics. It was also a commercial success for the group, reaching sales of over 340,000 copies. With this, Twice became the first Korean female act and the fifth music act overall to earn a Platinum certification from the Korea Music Content Association.

An expanded reissue of the EP titled Summer Nights was released on July 9, 2018.

== Background and release ==
On February 26, 2018, JYP Entertainment confirmed that Twice planned to release a new Korean album in April. On March 25, the agency announced that Twice would release their fifth EP titled What Is Love? on April 9. A promotion schedule for the EP was uploaded by the group on their official Twitter account. The first group image teaser was uploaded online the next day. On March 27, individual teaser photos featuring Nayeon, Jeongyeon, Momo, and Sana were released. On March 28, individual teaser photos featuring Jihyo, Mina, Dahyun, Chaeyoung, and Tzuyu were uploaded by the group. On the same day, JYP Entertainment confirmed that the album's lead single "What Is Love?" was written and produced by agency founder Park Jin-young, marking a year since Park last collaborated with Twice as a producer following the release of "Signal" in 2017. A part of the album's track list was later uploaded, revealing additional details crediting Lee Woo-min "collapsedone" for the arrangement of the lead single. On March 29, a second group image teaser was uploaded by the group. On the same day, a second teaser for the EP's track list was released, revealing two new tracks written by Twice members: "Sweet Talker" which was penned by Jeongyeon and Chaeyoung, and "Ho!" with lyrics written by Jihyo.

On March 30, a second set of individual teaser photos featuring Tzuyu, Chaeyoung, Dahyun, and Mina were uploaded. The full track list was also revealed by the group, announcing that the EP will feature six songs in total, with the sixth track "Stuck" being exclusive for the album's physical edition. On March 31, individual teaser photos featuring Jeongyeon, Momo, Sana, Jihyo, and Nayeon were uploaded. On April 1, the group uploaded an image containing the full lyrics for "What Is Love?". On the same day, member Nayeon uploaded a behind-the-scenes photo for the album in the group's official Instagram account, and also appeared at the 2018 KBO League to throw the ceremonial first pitch for the match between LG Twins and KIA Tigers.

On April 2, Twice released the first music video teaser for "What Is Love?" on JYP Entertainment's Youtube channel. On April 3, a second music video teaser clip featuring Chaeyoung, Dahyun, and Nayeon was released, revealing a part of the song's "question mark" point choreography. The following day, a third music video teaser clip featuring Momo, Sana, and Jeongyeon was uploaded. On April 5, a fourth music video teaser clip featuring Jihyo, Tzuyu, and Mina was released. On April 6, a fifth music video teaser clip featuring all Twice members was released, revealing a snippet of the title track. On April 7, the group uploaded an album highlight medley featuring snippets for all tracks. On April 8, Twice revealed the cover image for the album's digital release.

The EP was released as a digital download on various music sites on April 9 while the physical album was released the following day. "Stuck", which was initially a "CD-only" track on the physical album, was released digitally on April 30.

On July 9, the group released an expanded reissue for the EP titled Summer Nights, which was supported by the lead single "Dance The Night Away".

== Composition ==
What Is Love? is an EP consisting of six tracks overall. The title track "What Is Love?" is written and produced by Park Jin-young, is classified as a "hyper-pop" dance song that crosses over the trap genre, which lyrically talks about one's imaginations and curiosities regarding love, while ever only learning about it through books, movies, or television dramas. "Sweet Talker", written by members Jeongyeon and Chaeyoung, heavily features synth music mixed with percussions. "Ho!" is penned by Jihyo, and is described as a summer pop song that emphasizes a brass-driven band arrangement. "Deja Vu" is classified as a pop song that makes use of a "la la la"-worded hook and features a dubstep break. "Say Yes" is an acoustic-driven pop track with heavy influence from R&B while featuring the group's distinctive ballad sound.

The album's closing track, "Stuck", lyrically describes the feeling of falling in love. The track's lyricist took inspiration from the relationship between Twice and their fans.

== Promotion ==
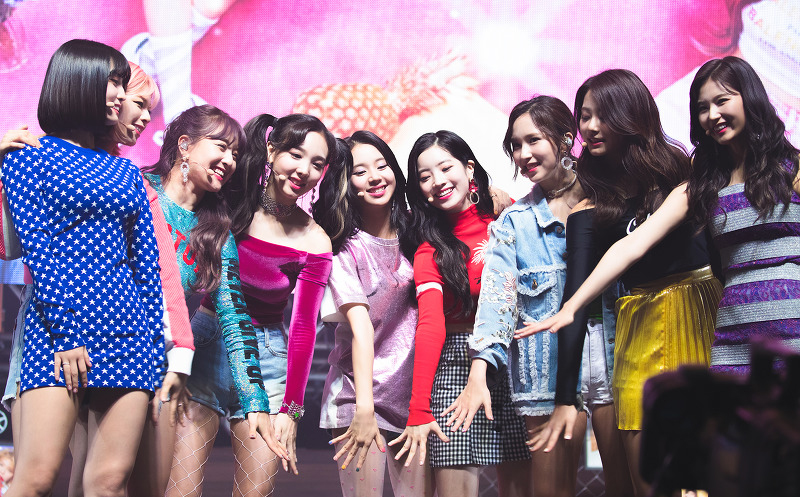
Twice in the live showcase for What Is Love? held on April 9, 2018

On the day of the album's release, Twice members Jeongyeon, Sana, and Tzuyu made an appearance on the KBS2 public talk show Hello Counselor, wherein they performed a part of the title track "What Is Love?" for the first time in live broadcast. Later that day, all members of the group then held a live showcase at the Yes24 Live Hall in Gwangjang-dong, Seoul wherein they performed the full song for the first time.

The group promoted their album in several South Korean music programs, starting with their appearance on M Countdown on April 12, 2018, where they performed "Say Yes" and "What Is Love?". They also made performances on Music Bank on April 13, Show! Music Core on April 14, Inkigayo on April 15, and on Show Champion on April 18 wherein the title track received its first music show win, among other performance dates. Music show promotions for What Is Love? ended on April 29. The title track achieved a total of 12 music show wins, with its last win being on Inkigayo in its episode aired on May 6.

Twice also made an appearance on You Hee-yeol's Sketchbook in its broadcast on April 15 wherein they performed "What Is Love?". They also performed the album's title track on a special broadcast of M Countdown for KCON Japan 2018 on April 19.

== Critical reception ==
Professional ratings
Review scores
Source	Rating
The Kraze	9.5/10
Popfection	8.6/10 stars
Vibes of Silence	6.5/10

Josh Shim of The Kraze magazine left a positive review for the EP, giving it a rating of 9.5 out of 10 points, stating that "What Is Love? may be Twice’s best mini-album since their glorious debut EP The Story Begins, and it’s because it shows the most growth among all the group’s releases so far." He further praised the production work for all the tracks, and described the album to be among the group's most cohesive releases overall. Music review site Popfection gave the EP a rating of 8.6 out of 10 points, describing it to be a "very solid release and comeback" from the group, while citing the title track alongside "Sweet Talker" and "Ho!" to be the album's highlights. Editor Nicole Moraleda of The South China Morning Post Youngpost described the album's track list as having "strong memorable hooks and cool soul-pop vibes", while further describing the EP to have dug further than conventional love songs.

Music review site Vibes of Silence gave a more lukewarm review for the EP, giving it a rating of 6.5 out of 10 points, praising the album's cohesiveness but pointing out the need for more versatility from the group.

== Commercial performance ==
On April 4, 2018, it was reported that pre-order sales for What Is Love? reached over 350,000 copies, surpassing the pre-order sales numbers achieved by Twice's full-length album Twicetagram which exceeded 330,000 pre-order copies. Upon release, the album debuted at number 2 on the Gaon Album Chart while the title track topped the Gaon Digital Chart. The album also entered both the Oricon Albums and Japan Digital Albums charts at numbers 2 and 3 respectively. The EP and its title track both entered the Billboard World Albums and World Digital Song Sales charts at number 3 respectively. What Is Love? was also Twice's first album to enter on the Billboard Independent Albums chart, ranking at number 35.

What Is Love? became the third best-selling album in South Korea for the month of April, selling 335,235 copies. With this, Twice became the first female artist—and the fifth overall act—to earn a Platinum certification from the Korea Music Content Association (KMCA) for reaching sales of over 250,000 copies since certifications began in 2018. By year-end, the EP became the tenth best-selling album in South Korea in 2018, reaching 348,797 copies sold. In March 2023, the album reached 500,000 copies sold and was certified Double Platinum by the KMCA.

== Track listing ==
No.	Title	Lyrics	Music	Arrangement	Length
1.	"What Is Love?"	J.Y. Park "The Asiansoul"	J.Y. Park "The Asiansoul"	Lee Woo-min "collapsedone"	3:28
2.	"Sweet Talker"	Jeongyeon; Chaeyoung	Erik Lidbom; MLC; Julie Yu	Erik Lidbom for Hitfire Production	3:27
3.	"Ho!"	Jihyo	Micky Blue; The Elev3n; Joren Van Der Voort	The Elev3n	3:09
4.	"Dejavu"	Chloe	Hayley Aitken; Jan Hallvard Larsen; Eirik Johansen; Anne Judith Stokke Wik; Ronny Vidar Svendsen; Nermin Harambašić	Aitken; Larsen; Johansen; Stokke Wik; Svendsen; Harambašić	3:16
5.	"Say Yes"	Lee Ju-hyeong (Monotree)	Lee Ju-hyeong (Monotree)	Lee Ju-hyeong (Monotree)	3:02
Total length:					16:29

Physical edition track
No.	Title	Lyrics	Music	Arrangement	Length
6.	"Stuck"	Star Wars (Galactika)	Frants; Valeria Del Prete; Sean Alexander	Frants; Avenue 52	3:38
Total length:					20:06

== Personnel ==
Credits adapted from album liner notes.

- J. Y. Park "The Asiansoul" – producer
- Lee Ji-young – direction and coordination (A&R)
- Jang Ha-na – music (A&R)
- Kim Yeo-joo (Jane Kim) – music (A&R)
- Kim Ji-hyeong – production (A&R)
- Cha Ji-yoon – production (A&R)
- Choi A-ra – production (A&R)
- Kim Je-na (Jenna Kim) – production (A&R)
- Kim Bo-hyeon – design (A&R), album art direction and design
- Kim Tae-eun – design (A&R), album art direction and design, and web design
- Choi Jeong-eun – design (A&R) and album art direction and design
- Lee So-yeon – design (A&R), album art direction and design, and web design
- Eom Se-hee – recording and mixing engineer
- Choi Hye-jin – recording and mixing engineer
- No Min-ji – recording engineer
- Lee Ju-hyeong – recording engineer, and vocal director, keyboard, Pro Tools operator, and digital editor (on "Say Yes")
- Friday of Galactika – recording engineer, and vocal producer and background vocals (on "What Is Love?" and "Stuck")
- Tony Maserati – mixing engineer
- James Krausse – mixing engineer
- Lim Hong-jin – mixing engineer
- Ko Hyeon-jeong – mixing engineer
- Master Key – mixing engineer
- Kwon Nam-woo – mastering engineer
- Naive Production – video director
- Kim Young-jo – video executive producer
- Yoo Seung-woo – video executive producer
- Choi Pyeong-gang – video co-producer
- Jang Deok-hwa at Agency PROD – photographer
- Seo Yeon-ah – web design
- Son Eun-hee at Lulu – hair and makeup director
- Jung Nan-young at Lulu – hair and makeup director
- Choi Ji-young at Lulu – hair and makeup director
- Jo Sang-ki at Lulu – hair and makeup director
- Zia at Lulu – hair and makeup director
- Jeon Dal-lae at Lulu – hair and makeup director
- Won Jung-yo at Bit&Boot – makeup director
- Choi Su-ji at Bit&Boot – makeup director
- Choi Hee-seon at F. Choi – style director
- Seo Ji-eun at F. Choi – style director
- Lee Ga-young at F. Choi – style director
- Lee Jin-young at F. Choi – style director
- Park Soo-young at F. Choi – style director
- Park Jin-hee at F. Choi – style director
- Han Jin-joo at F. Choi – style director
- Shin Hyun-kuk – management and marketing director
- Yoon Hee-so – choreographer
- Kang Da-sol – choreographer
- Kyle Hanagami – choreographer
- Freemind Choi Young-joon – choreographer
- Freemind Chae Da-som – choreographer
- Choi Nam-mi – choreographer
- Today Art – printing
- Lee Woo-min "collapsedone" – all instruments, computer programming, guitar, synths, and piano (on "What Is Love?")
- E.Na – background vocals (on "What Is Love?" and "Stuck")
- Park Soo-min – background vocals (on "What Is Love?", "Sweet Talker" and "Ho!")
- Erik Lidbom – all instruments, computer programming, and digital editor (on "Sweet Talker")
- Armadillo – vocal director (on "Sweet Talker")
- Jiyoung Shin NYC – additional editor (on "Sweet Talker", "Ho!", and "Dejavu")
- The Elev3n – all instruments, computer programming, and digital editor (on "Ho!")
- Kim Seung-soo – vocal director (on "Ho!")
- Mental Audio (Eirik Johansen and Jan Hallvard Larsen) – all instruments and computer programming (on "Dejavu")
- Hayley Aitken – background vocals (on "Dejavu")
- Anne Judith Wik – background vocals (on "Dejavu")
- Jowul – vocal director (on "Dejavu")
- Jeon Jae-hee – background vocals (on "Say Yes")
- Jeok Jae – guitar (on "Say Yes")
- Kim Byeong-seok – bass (on "Say Yes")
- Frants – all instruments, computer programming, synth, bass, and drum (on "Stuck")
- Shane – guitar (on "Stuck")

=== Locations ===
Recording

- JYPE Studios, Seoul, South Korea

Mixing

- Mirrorball Studios, North Hollywood, California
- JYPE Studios, Seoul, South Korea
- Koko Sound, Seoul, South Korea
- Studio Instinct, Seoul, South Korea
- 821 Sound, Seoul, South Korea

Mastering

- 821 Sound Mastering, Seoul, South Korea

Photography

- Imvely flagship store "Velyne", Seoul, South Korea

== Charts ==
=== Weekly charts ===
Chart (2018)	Peak position
Japan Hot Albums (Billboard)	10
Japanese Albums (Oricon)	2
Japanese Digital Albums (Oricon)	3
South Korean Albums (Gaon)	2
US Heatseekers Albums (Billboard)	13
US Independent Albums (Billboard)	35
US World Albums (Billboard)	3

=== Year-end charts ===
Chart (2018)	Position
Japanese Albums (Oricon)	58
South Korean Albums (Gaon)	10

Chart (2019)	Position
South Korean Albums (Gaon)	98

== Certifications ==
Region	Certification	Certified units/sales
South Korea (KMCA)	2× Platinum	500,000^{^}
^{^} Shipments figures based on certification alone.

== Accolades ==
Year	Award	Category	Result	Ref.
2018	20th Mnet Asian Music Awards	Album of the Year	Nominated	
2019	33rd Golden Disc Awards	Album Daesang (Album of the Year)	Nominated	
2019	33rd Golden Disc Awards	Album Bonsang	Won	
2019	8th Gaon Chart Music Awards	Artist of the Year – Physical Album (2nd Quarter)	Nominated	

== Release history ==
Release dates and formats for What Is Love?
Region	Date	Format(s)	Label	Ref.
Various	April 9, 2018	Digital download; streaming	JYP	
South Korea	April 10, 2018	CD	JYP	
