= BDZ (song) =

2018 song by Twice

Single by Twice

from the album BDZ
- Language: Japanese
- Released: August 17, 2018
- Genre: J-pop; electropop
- Length: 3:17
- Label: Warner Music Japan
- Composer: J. Y. Park "The Asiansoul"
- Lyricists: J. Y. Park; Shoko Fujibayashi; Yu Shimoji

Twice singles chronology
"Dance the Night Away" (2018)	"BDZ" (2018)	"Yes or Yes" (2018)

Twice Japanese singles chronology
"Wake Me Up" (2018)	"BDZ" (2018)	"Happy Happy" (2019)

Music video
- "BDZ" on YouTube

"BDZ" (an abbreviation for "bulldozer") is a song recorded by South Korean girl group Twice. Written and composed by J. Y. Park, it was released by Warner Music Japan on August 17, 2018, as a digital single from Twice's first Japanese studio album of the same name.

== Release and promotion ==
The song was pre-released as a digital single on August 17, 2018, along with an accompanying music video directed by Naive Creative Production, the team behind most of Twice's previous music videos. The song was officially released with the album of the same name on September 12.

On August 31, Twice performed "BDZ" for the first time on Music Station, and it was performed on the opening stage of Tokyo Girls Collection the next day. "BDZ" was also performed during Twice 1st Arena Tour 2018 "BDZ", starting on September 29 in Chiba.

== Composition ==
"BDZ", an electropop song, was composed by J. Y. Park, with the Japanese lyrics penned by Shoko Fujibayashi and Yu Shimoji. It is about "moving forward and pushing away obstacles like a bulldozer" and "conveys feelings of strength and starting anew." Park stated that it is "a song for fans and Twice to sing and enjoy together."

== Korean version ==
The Korean version of "BDZ" was released on November 5, 2018, as the seventh track of Twice's sixth extended play (EP) Yes or Yes. The group performed the song during their comeback showcase for the EP, as well as on South Korean music programs.

== Charts ==
=== Weekly charts ===
Weekly chart performance for "BDZ"
Chart (2018)	Peak position
Japan (Japan Hot 100)	7
US World Digital Songs (Billboard)	23

=== Year-end chart ===
Year-end chart performance for "BDZ"
Chart (2018)	Position
Japan (Japan Hot 100)	75

== Certifications ==
Streaming certifications for "BDZ"
Region	Certification	Certified units/sales
Japan (RIAJ)	Gold	50,000,000^{†}
^{†} Streaming-only figures based on certification alone.

== Release history ==
Release history and formats for "BDZ"
Region	Date	Version	Format	Label	Ref.
Various	August 17, 2018	Japanese	Digital download, streaming	JYP Entertainment; Warner Music Japan	
Various	November 5, 2018	Korean	Digital download, streaming	JYP Entertainment	
