= Candy Pop (Twice song) =

2018 single by Twice

- Standard single cover

Single by Twice

from the album BDZ
- Language: Japanese
- B-side: "Brand New Girl"
- Released: February 7, 2018
- Genre: J-pop; electropop
- Length: 3:22
- Label: Warner Music Japan
- Songwriters: Min Lee "collapsedone"; Mayu Wakisaka

Twice singles chronology
"Heart Shaker" (2017)	"Candy Pop" (2018)	"What Is Love?" (2018)

Twice Japanese singles chronology
"One More Time" (2017)	"Candy Pop" (2018)	"Wake Me Up" (2018)

Music video
- "Candy Pop" on YouTube

"Candy Pop" is a song recorded by South Korean girl group Twice. It is the group's second Japanese maxi single, featuring three other tracks. The song was pre-released as a digital single on January 12, 2018, and the CD single was released on February 7 by Warner Music Japan.

The single album recorded the highest number of copies sold on the first day of sales out of all Korean girl groups who debuted in Japan.

== Background and release ==
On December 22, 2017, Twice announced the release of their second Japanese single titled "Candy Pop", along with several teaser images for the new track. A sneak peek of its B-side track titled "Brand New Girl" was also released the same day, as it was selected as the commercial music for Line's Clova Friends smart speaker. On January 12, 2018, "Candy Pop" was pre-released as a digital single on various online music portals. On January 23, "Brand New Girl" was pre-released as a digital single on Line Music.

The CD single was officially released on February 7. "Candy Pop" and "Brand New Girl" were also digitally released on various South Korean music sites the same day.

== Composition ==
"Candy Pop"
Pre-chorus and chorus part of "Candy Pop" with electropop tune.

"Candy Pop" was composed by Woo Min Lee "collapsedone" and Mayu Wakisaka, who previously collaborated with Twice on "Knock Knock".

== Music video ==
The full music video of "Candy Pop" was uploaded online on January 12, 2018. The anime-style video was directed by Takahiko Kyōgoku, best known for his work as the director of anime television series Love Live!, in collaboration with Naive Creative Production, the team behind most of Twice's previous music videos. The story line was written by Park Jin-young. There are also hidden characters which were illustrated by member Chaeyoung.

It features the nine members as cartoon singers in a candy-coated realm, filming on set of a music video that a human girl is watching. They see the girl who looks lonely and sad, and want to encourage her. With the help of the animated character of Park Jin-young, Twice transforms into humans, escapes the candy land and heads to the human world in a candy car to meet the girl.

The music video ranked at No. 6 on 2018 YouTube's Top Trend Music Video in Japan, the group's second song on the list.

== Promotion ==
"Candy Pop" and "Brand New Girl" were first performed during Twice Showcase Live Tour 2018 "Candy Pop", which began on January 19, 2018, in Seto, Aichi. "Candy Pop" was also performed on Music Station on February 2. "Candy Pop" and "Brand New Girl" were also featured on TBS's Count Down TV on February 3 and 10, respectively.

== Commercial performance ==
The CD single debuted atop the daily ranking of the Oricon Singles Chart with 117,486 units sold on its release day. It recorded the highest number of copies sold on the first day of sales out of all Korean girl groups who debuted in Japan. The CD single topped the weekly Oricon Singles Chart with 265,758 copies sold. On the Oricon Digital Singles Chart, it debuted at number 14 with 7,517 downloads. It was also reported that it sold 333,633 copies in pre-orders, while Billboard Japan recorded 303,746 unit sales from February 5–11, 2018. On February 24, "Candy Pop" exceeded 400,000 shipments.

== Track listing ==
Digital download EP
No.	Title	Lyrics	Music	Arrangement	Length
1.	"Candy Pop"	Woo Min Lee "collapsedone"; Mayu Wakisaka	Woo Min Lee "collapsedone"; Mayu Wakisaka	Woo Min Lee "collapsedone"	3:22
2.	"Brand New Girl"	Na.Zu.Na; Yu-ki Kokubo	Na.Zu.Na; Michael Yano (M.I); Yu-ki Kokubo	Na.Zu.Na	3:33
3.	"Candy Pop" (Instrumental)		Woo Min Lee "collapsedone"; Mayu Wakisaka	Woo Min Lee "collapsedone"	3:22
4.	"Brand New Girl" (Instrumental)		Na.Zu.Na; Michael Yano (M.I); Yu-ki Kokubo	Na.Zu.Na	3:33
Total length:					13:50

First press limited edition A DVD
No.	Title	Length
1.	"Candy Pop" (Music video)
2.	"Candy Pop" (Music video making movie)

First press limited edition B DVD
No.	Title	Length
1.	"Candy Pop" (Music video dance ver.)
2.	"Jacket Shooting Making Movie"

== Content production ==
Credits adapted from CD single liner notes.

=== Locations ===
Recording

- JYPE Studios, Seoul, South Korea

Mixing

- Mirrorball Studios, North Hollywood, California ("Candy Pop")
- I to I Communications, Tokyo, Japan ("Brand New Girl")

Mastering

- Sterling Sound, New York City, New York

=== Personnel ===
JYP Entertainment staff

- Song Ji-eun "Shannen" (JYP Entertainment Japan) – executive producer
- Jimmy Jeong (JYP Entertainment) – executive producer
- Cho Hae-sung (JYP Entertainment) – executive producer
- J. Y. Park "The Asiansoul" – producer
- Jung Kyoung-hee (JYP Entertainment Japan) – administration
- Park Nam-yong (JYP Entertainment) – performance director
- Kim Hyung-woong (JYP Entertainment) – performance director
- Yun Hee-so (JYP Entertainment) – performance director
- Na Tae-hoon (JYP Entertainment) – performance director
- Yoo Kwang-yeol (JYP Entertainment) – performance director
- Kang Da-sol (JYP Entertainment) – performance director
- Lee Tae-sub (JYP Entertainment) – recording engineer
- Choi Hye-jin (JYP Entertainment) – recording engineer
- Eom Se-hee (JYP Entertainment) – recording engineer
- Lim Hong-jin (JYP Entertainment) – recording engineer
- Jang Han-soo (JYP Entertainment) – recording engineer
- Lee Jeong-yun "Lia" (JYP Publishing) – publishing
- Kim Min-ji (JYP Publishing) – publishing
- Shin Da-ye (JYP Publishing) – publishing
- Cho Hyun-woo (JYP Publishing) – publishing

Warner Music Japan staff

- Kaz Kobayashi – executive producer
- Hayato Kajino – supervisor
- Rie Sawaoka – supervisor

Japanese recording staff

- Goei Ito (Obelisk) – music director
- Yu-ki Kokubo (Obelisk) – recording director
- Satoshi Sasamoto – Pro Tools operation

Design staff

- Toshiyuki Suzuki (United Lounge Tokyo) – art direction
- Yasuhiro Uaeda (United Lounge Tokyo) – design
- Tommy – photography
- Masaaki Mitsuzono – jacket photo style director
- Choi Hee-sun (F. Choi) - music video style director
- Lim Ji-hyun (F. Choi) - music video style director
- F. Choi - music video style director
- Lee Jin-young (F. Choi) - music video assistant stylist
- Heo Su-yeon (F. Choi) - music video assistant stylist
- Jung Nan-young (Lulu Hair Makeup Studio) – hair director
- Choi Ji-young (Lulu Hair Makeup Studio) – hair director
- Son Eun-hee (Lulu Hair Makeup Studio) – hair director
- Jo Sang-ki (Lulu Hair Makeup Studio) – makeup director
- Jeon Dallae (Lulu Hair Makeup Studio) – makeup director
- Zia (Lulu Hair Makeup Studio) – makeup director
- Won Jung-yo – makeup director
- Choi Su-ji – assistant makeup director

Movie staff

- Kim Young-jo (Naive Production) – music video director
- Yoo Seung-woo (Naive Production) – music video director
- Takahiko Kyōgoku – music video animation director
- Hiroyuki Katō (OLM Team Kato) – music video animation producer
- Han Gui-taek – music video making and jacket shooting making movie director
- Yu Yamaguchi (Warner Music Mastering) – DVD authoring

Other personnel

- Min Lee "collapsedone" – all instruments and computer programming (on "Candy Pop")
- Na.Zu.Na – all instruments (on "Brand New Girl")
- Twice – background vocals
- Ikuko Tsutsumi – background vocals
- Mayu Wakisaka – background vocals and vocal recording director (on "Candy Pop")
- Tony Maserati – mixing engineer (on "Candy Pop")
- Naoki Yamada – mixing engineer (on "Brand New Girl")
- Ted Jensen at Sterling Sound – mastering engineer

== Charts ==
=== Weekly charts ===
Weekly chart performance for "Candy Pop"
Chart (2018)	Peak position
Japan (Japan Hot 100)	1
Japan (Oricon)	1
Japan Digital Singles (Oricon)	14
South Korea International (Gaon)	80

=== Year-end charts ===
Year-end chart performance for "Candy Pop"
Chart (2018)	Position
Japan (Japan Hot 100)	8
Japan (Oricon)	20

== Certifications ==
Certifications for "Candy Pop"
Region	Certification	Certified units/sales
Japan (RIAJ)	Platinum	250,000^{^}
Streaming
Japan (RIAJ)	Gold	50,000,000^{†}
^{^} Shipments figures based on certification alone.^{†} Streaming-only figures based on certification alone.

== Accolades ==
Accolades for "Candy Pop"
Year	Award	Category	Result	Ref.
2019	33rd Japan Gold Disc Award	Song of the Year by Download (Asia)	Won	
