= What Is Love? (Twice song) =

2018 single by Twice

Single by Twice

from the EP What Is Love?
- Language: Korean
- Released: April 9, 2018
- Genre: K-pop; electropop
- Length: 3:28
- Label: JYP
- Songwriters: J.Y. Park "The Asiansoul"; Lee Woo-min "collapsedone"
- Producer: J.Y. Park "The Asiansoul"

Twice singles chronology
"Candy Pop" (2018)	"What Is Love?" (2018)	"Wake Me Up" (2018)

Music video
- "What Is Love?" on YouTube

"What Is Love?" is a song recorded by South Korean girl group Twice. It was released by JYP Entertainment on April 9, 2018, as the lead single from their fifth extended play of the same name. The song earned the group their third consecutive Song of the Year award at the 2018 Mnet Asian Music Awards.

== Release ==
"What Is Love?" was released as the lead single from Twice's extended play of the same name on April 9, 2018. The group's second compilation album #Twice2, released in March 2019, includes both Korean and Japanese versions of the song. "What Is Love? (Japanese ver.)" was pre-released as a digital single on February 7, 2019, along with an accompanying music video. The Japanese lyrics were written by Risa Horie. It was first performed on Music Station Super Live on December 21, 2018.

== Composition ==
"What Is Love?" was written and composed by Park Jin-young, who previously produced "Signal", and it was arranged by Lee Woo-min "collapsedone", who co-produced "Knock Knock" and "Candy Pop". According to JYP Entertainment, the song is about "the love girls would dream about or imagine after learning about it through books, movies or dramas" and it has a bright melody and uptempo dance beat incorporating trap. Tamar Herman of Billboard described the song as having "retro electro-pop styling" and an "addictive choral hook", with "digital quirks, sparkling chimes, and staccato'd percussion over the bubblegum melody".

== Music video ==
Similar to the music video for "Cheer Up", the members of Twice portray characters from famous films in the "What Is Love" music video. Nayeon is Mia from The Princess Diaries, Jeongyeon and Sana are Molly and Sam from Ghost, Mina and Dahyun are Vic and Matthieu from La Boum, Sana and Tzuyu are Mia and Vincent from Pulp Fiction, Jeongyeon and Tzuyu are Romeo and Juliet from Romeo + Juliet, Jihyo and Jeongyeon are Itsuki/Hiroko and male Itsuki from Love Letter, Momo and Tzuyu are Mia and Sebastian from La La Land, and Dahyun and Chaeyoung are Léon and Mathilda from Léon: The Professional. The music video also has scenes showing the song's choreography, Twice at a sleepover watching the movies on TV, and Dahyun's "commercial break" that includes product placement for Acuvue contact lenses.

The music video was ranked fourth on the 2018 YouTube's Most Popular Music Videos list in South Korea. It also ranked at number 5 on the 2018 YouTube's Top Trend Music Videos in Japan. In February 2023, "What Is Love?" became Twice's first music video to reach 700 million views on the platform.

== Commercial performance ==
The song debuted atop Gaon's Digital Chart and Billboard Korea's Kpop Hot 100. It also peaked at No. 3 and 6 on Billboard charts' World Digital Song Sales and Billboard Japan Hot 100, respectively. The song placed at number 29 at Billboard Japan Hot 100 year-end chart, and placed at number 14 in Top Streaming Songs.

"What Is Love?" surpassed 100 million streams in October 2019, becoming Twice's third consecutive Platinum certification single for streaming from the Korea Music Content Association (KMCA). In April 2020, "What Is Love?" earned Silver streaming certification from the Recording Industry Association of Japan (RIAJ) for surpassing 30 million streams. In 2021, "What Is Love?" re-charted on several music streaming services after going viral on TikTok. Over 1 million videos on TikTok have used the song as their background music.

== Accolades ==
"What Is Love" received 12 first place awards on South Korean music programs.

Awards and nominations for "What Is Love?"
Award	Year	Category	Result	Ref.
Genie Music Awards	2018	Best Female Dance Performance	Nominated	
Mnet Asian Music Awards	2018	Song of the Year	Won	
Mnet Asian Music Awards	2018	Best Dance Performance – Female Group	Won	
Mnet Asian Music Awards	2018	Best Music Video	Nominated	
Gaon Chart Music Awards	2019	Artist of the Year – Digital Music (April)	Won	

Music program awards
Program	Date	Ref.
Show Champion	April 18, 2018	
Show Champion	April 25, 2018	
Show Champion	May 2, 2018	
M Countdown	April 19, 2018	
M Countdown	April 26, 2018	
Music Bank	April 20, 2018	
Music Bank	April 27, 2018	
Show! Music Core	April 21, 2018	
Show! Music Core	April 28, 2018	
Inkigayo	April 22, 2018	
Inkigayo	April 29, 2018	
Inkigayo	May 6, 2018	

== Charts ==
=== Weekly charts ===
2018 weekly chart performance for "What Is Love?"
Chart (2018)	Peak position
Japan (Japan Hot 100)	6
Japan Digital Singles (Oricon)	5
Malaysia (RIM)	13
Singapore (RIAS)	5
South Korea (Gaon)	1
South Korea (K-pop Hot 100)	1
US World Digital Song Sales (Billboard)	3

2025 weekly chart performance for "What Is Love?"
Chart (2025)	Peak position
Taiwan (Billboard)	10

=== Year-end charts ===
2018 year-end chart performance for "What Is Love?"
Chart (2018)	Position
Japan (Japan Hot 100)	29
South Korean (Gaon)	25

2019 year-end chart performance for "What Is Love?"
Chart (2019)	Position
Japan (Japan Hot 100)	79

== Certifications ==
Certifications
Region	Certification	Certified units/sales
New Zealand (RMNZ)	Gold	15,000^{‡}
South Korea (KMCA)	Platinum	2,500,000^{*}
Streaming
Japan (RIAJ)	Platinum	100,000,000^{†}
South Korea (KMCA)	Platinum	100,000,000^{†}
^{*} Sales figures based on certification alone.^{‡} Sales+streaming figures based on certification alone.^{†} Streaming-only figures based on certification alone.

== See also ==
- List of certified songs in South Korea
- List of Gaon Digital Chart number ones of 2018
- List of Inkigayo Chart winners (2018)
- List of K-pop Hot 100 number ones
- List of M Countdown Chart winners (2018)
- List of Music Bank Chart winners (2018)
