= One More Time (Twice song) =

2017 single by Twice

- Standard single cover

Single by Twice

from the album BDZ
- Language: Japanese
- B-side: "Luv Me"
- Released: October 18, 2017
- Genre: J-pop
- Length: 3:03
- Label: Warner Music Japan
- Composers: Na.Zu.Na; Yu-ki Kokubo; Yhanael
- Lyricists: Natsumi Watanabe; Yhanael

Twice singles chronology
| "Signal" (2017) | "One More Time" (2017) | "Likey" (2017) |

Twice Japanese singles chronology
| "One More Time" (2017) | "Candy Pop" (2018) |

Music video
- "One More Time" on YouTube

"One More Time" is a song recorded by South Korean girl group Twice. It is the group's first Japanese maxi single, featuring three other tracks. It was released on October 18, 2017, by Warner Music Japan.

The single achieved both the biggest first-day and first-week sales of any South Korean girl group release in Japan. With over 250,000 unit sales, it is the first Japanese single by a K-pop girl group to earn a Platinum certification by the Recording Industry Association of Japan (RIAJ).

== Release and promotion ==
On September 15, 2017, Twice announced the release of their first Japanese single titled "One More Time", along with several teaser images for the new track. The group had previously teased the single in August through a promotional video titled #Twice Spot Movie with the caption "One More Time…?" at the end of the video. The song was first revealed on Tokyo FM's School of Lock! on October 5.

On October 17, Twice performed "One More Time" for the first time on the television morning program Sukkiri on Nippon TV. Two days later, the group appeared as a guest on School of Lock!, their debut on-air radio broadcast in Japan. On October 22, they performed "One More Time", "Like Ooh-Ahh (Japanese ver.)" and "TT (Japanese ver.)" on Fuji TV's Mezamashi TV Presents T-Spook – Tokyo Halloween Party, one of the largest Halloween events in the country.

The CD single was released in four different versions: Standard Edition, Fanclub Edition (Halloween Version), First Press Limited Edition A (CD and DVD that contains the song's music video and its movie making) and First Press Limited Edition B (CD and DVD that contains music video dance version and jacket shooting making movie). On February 7, 2018, "One More Time" and "Luv Me" were digitally released on various South Korean music sites, along with the release of "Candy Pop".

== Composition ==
"One More Time"
The chorus and lead-up to second verse shows diverse voices of Nayeon, Tzuyu, Jihyo, Jeongyeon and Chaeyoung.

"One More Time" was composed by Na.Zu.Na, Yu-ki Kokubo and Yhanael, with lyrics written by Natsumi Watanabe and Yhanael. Caitlin Kelley, writing for Billboard, said the song "enlists some '90s electronica vibes that deviate from the EDM that's been taking over K-pop lately, with a combination of the blaring synths and loud bass that sounds like Sleigh Bells-meets-Eurodance".

== Music video ==
The music video teasers were released on September 25 and 29, 2017. Ahead of the single's official release, the full music video was uploaded online on October 6. It features Twice dressed in bright colors as the members are seen performing a variety of sports activities: Nayeon and Jihyo have a tennis match scene reminiscent of the anime The Prince of Tennis. Chaeyoung and Dahyun have a boxing face off refereed by Jeongyeon with Sana as the ring girl. Momo, Mina and Tzuyu are rhythmic gymnasts performing with hoop, ball and ribbon, respectively.

== Commercial performance ==
Prior to dropping the CD single, "One More Time" entered the Billboard Japan Hot 100 at number 57 and spent four weeks on the chart until it reached the top spot, one week after its official release. The song also debuted at number 15 on Billboard charts' World Digital Song Sales, then rose into the Top 10 at number 8 the following week.

The CD single debuted atop the daily ranking of the Oricon Singles Chart with 94,957 units sold, setting a new first-day sales record for South Korean girl groups. The record was previously held by Girls' Generation's debut Japanese album, Girls' Generation (2011), which sold 74,000 copies on its release day. On its second day, "One More Time" became the fastest-selling K-pop girl group release in Japan based on first week figures. The previous record holder was Kara's "Jet Coaster Love" (2011), which sold 122,820 copies during its first week.

It was reported that almost 300,000 copies of "One More Time" were shipped out in pre-orders, while Billboard Japan recorded 150,425 unit sales from October 16–18, 2017 only. It also became the first Japanese single by a South Korean girl group to receive a Platinum certification from the Recording Industry Association of Japan, making Twice the first South Korean girl group to earn a platinum certification in Japan for both a single and an album in the same year. 329,400 copies were shipped as of February 23, 2018.

== Track listing ==
Digital download EP
| No. | Title | Lyrics | Music | Arrangement | Length |
|---|---|---|---|---|---|
| 1. | "One More Time" | Natsumi Watanabe; Yhanael | Na.Zu.Na; Yu-ki Kokubo; Yhanael | Na.Zu.Na | 3:03 |
| 2. | "Luv Me" | Yuka Matsumoto | Albin Nordqvist; Malin Johansson; Susumu Kawaguchi | Albin Nordqvist | 3:29 |
| 3. | "One More Time" (Instrumental) | | Yhanael; Yu-ki Kokubo; Na.Zu.Na | Na.Zu.Na | 3:03 |
| 4. | "Luv Me" (Instrumental) | | Albin Nordqvist; Malin Johansson; Susumu Kawaguchi | Albin Nordqvist | 3:29 |
| Total length: | | | | | 13:04 |

First press limited edition A DVD
| No. | Title | Length |
|---|---|---|
| 1. | "One More Time" (Music video) |
| 2. | "One More Time" (Music video making movie) |

First press limited edition B DVD
| No. | Title | Length |
|---|---|---|
| 1. | "One More Time" (Music video dance ver.) |
| 2. | "Jacket Shooting Making Movie" |

== Content production ==
Credits adapted from CD single liner notes.

=== Locations ===
Recording

- JYPE Studios, Seoul, South Korea

Mixing

- Mirrorball Studios, North Hollywood, California ("One More Time")

Mastering

- Sterling Sound, New York City, New York

=== Personnel ===
JYP Entertainment staff

- Song Ji-eun "Shannen" (JYP Entertainment Japan) – executive producer
- Jimmy Jeong (JYP Entertainment) – executive producer
- J. Y. Park "The Asiansoul" – producer
- Park Nam-yong (JYP Entertainment) – choreographer
- Kim Hyung-woong (JYP Entertainment) – choreographer
- Yun Hee-soo (JYP Entertainment) – choreographer
- Na Tae-hoon (JYP Entertainment) – choreographer
- Yoo Kwang-yeol (JYP Entertainment) – choreographer
- Kang Da-sol (JYP Entertainment) – choreographer
- Lee Tae-sub (JYP Entertainment) – recording engineer
- Choi Hye-jin (JYP Entertainment) – recording engineer
- Eom Se-hee (JYP Entertainment) – recording engineer
- Lim Hong-jin (JYP Entertainment) – recording engineer
- Jang Han-soo (JYP Entertainment) – recording engineer

Warner Music Japan staff

- Kaz Kobayashi – executive producer

Japanese version recording staff

- Goei Ito (Obelisk) – music director
- Yu-ki Kokubo (Obelisk) – recording director
- Satoshi Sasamoto – Pro Tools operation

Design staff

- Toshiyuki Suzuki (United Lounge Tokyo) – art direction
- Yasuhiro Uaeda (United Lounge Tokyo) – design
- Tommy – photography
- Choi Hee-sun at F. Choi – style director
- Lim Ji-hyun at F. Choi – style director
- Lee Jin-young at F. Choi – assistant stylist
- Ju Young-suk at F. Choi – assistant stylist
- Heo Su-yeon at F. Choi – assistant stylist
- Park Nae-joo – hair director
- Kim Se-gyeong – hair director
- Han So-hee – assistant hair director
- Han Gwi-seon – assistant hair director
- Won Jung-yo – makeup director
- Choi Su-ji – assistant makeup director
- Jung You-jung – assistant makeup director

Movie staff

- Kim Young-jo (Naive Production) – music video director
- Yoo Seung-woo (Naive Production) – music video director
- Han Gui-taek – music video making and jacket shooting making movie director
- Yu Yamaguchi (Warner Music Mastering) – DVD authoring

Other personnel

- Na.Zu.Na – session instruments (on "One More Time")
- Jae-pil Jung – guitar (on "One More Time")
- Albin Nordqvist – session instruments (on "Luv Me")
- Twice – background vocals
- Ikuko Tsutsumi – background vocals
- Tony Maserati – mixing engineer (on "One More Time")
- Ryosuke Kataoka – mixing engineer (on "Luv Me")
- Chris Gehringer – mastering engineer

== Charts ==
=== Weekly charts ===
Weekly chart performance for "One More Time"
| Chart (2017) | Peak position |
|---|---|
| Japan (Japan Hot 100) | 1 |
| Japan (Oricon) | 1 |
| Philippines (Philippine Hot 100) | 93 |
| Philippines (BillboardPH K-pop Top 5) | 5 |
| US World Digital Song Sales (Billboard) | 8 |

=== Year-end charts ===
2017 year-end chart performance for "One More Time"
| Chart (2017) | Position |
|---|---|
| Japan (Japan Hot 100) | 31 |
| Japan (Oricon) | 24 |

2018 year-end chart performance for "One More Time"
| Chart (2018) | Position |
|---|---|
| Japan (Japan Hot 100) | 86 |

== Certifications ==
Certifications for "One More Time"
| Region | Certification | Certified units/sales |
|---|---|---|
| Japan (RIAJ) | Platinum | 250,000^{^} |
Streaming
| Japan (RIAJ) | Gold | 50,000,000^{†} |
^{^} Shipments figures based on certification alone.^{†} Streaming-only figures based on certification alone.
