= BDZ (album) =

2018 studio album by Twice

- Standard edition cover

Studio album by Twice
- Released: September 12, 2018
- Studios: JYPE Studios (Seoul, South Korea); U Production
- Genres: J-pop; electropop
- Length: 35:24
- Languages: Japanese; English
- Label: Warner Music Japan

Twice chronology
Summer Nights (2018)	BDZ (2018)	Yes or Yes (2018)

Singles from BDZ
- 1. "One More Time" Released: October 5, 2017; 2. "Candy Pop" Released: January 12, 2018; 3. "Wake Me Up" Released: April 24, 2018; 4. "BDZ" Released: August 17, 2018

BDZ (Repackage)
- Standard edition (repackage) cover

Professional ratings
Review scores
Source	Rating
IZM	3/5 stars

BDZ (an abbreviation for "bulldozer") is the debut Japanese studio album (second overall) by South Korean girl group Twice. It was released on September 12, 2018, by Warner Music Japan. The album contains five previously released songs and five new ones, including the title track of the same name produced by Park Jin-young. The title "symbolizes the members' wish to be tough and live strong".

A repackaged edition with one additional song was released on December 26, 2018.

== Background and release ==
On June 3, 2018, at Twice 2nd Tour: Twiceland Zone 2 – Fantasy Park in Osaka, it was announced that Twice would release their first Japanese album in the autumn. The title track "BDZ" was pre-released as a digital single on August 17, along with the accompanying music video. The full album was released on September 12, along with a "document video" of "Be as One" featuring behind-the-scenes footage of Twice's first year in Japan.

A repackage was released on December 26, 2018, containing "Stay by My Side", the theme song of the Japanese television drama Shinya no Dame Koi Zukan. "Stay by My Side" was released as a digital single on October 22 along with a "making" music video showing Twice recording the song.

== Promotion ==
"BDZ" was first performed on Music Station on August 31, 2018, and it was performed on the opening stage of Tokyo Girls Collection the next day. All songs from the album were performed during Twice 1st Arena Tour 2018 "BDZ", which began on September 29 in Chiba.

== Commercial performance ==
BDZ debuted at number 1 on the daily ranking of the Oricon Albums Chart with 89,721 units sold, setting a record for the highest first day sales of albums released by K-pop girl groups in Japan. It also topped the weekly ranking with 181,069 units sold, making Twice the fifth foreign female artist in Oricon history to top both the weekly singles and albums chart, after The Nolans, BoA, Kara, and Girls' Generation. On the Oricon Digital Album Chart, it debuted at number 1 with 3,103 downloads.

The album topped the Billboard Japan Hot Albums chart, selling 181,605 copies and 3,239 downloads from September 10–16, 2018. On September 15, it was reported that it sold more than 292,300 copies in pre-orders. It was certified Platinum by the RIAJ on October 11 – Twice's fifth consecutive platinum certification.

== Track listing ==
No.	Title	Lyrics	Music	Arrangement	Length
1.	"BDZ"	J.Y. Park "The Asiansoul"; Shoko Fujibayashi; Yu Shimoji	J.Y. Park "The Asiansoul"	J.Y. Park "The Asiansoul"; Hae Sol Lee	3:17
2.	"One More Time"	Natsumi Watanabe; Yhanael	Na.Zu.Na; Yu-ki Kokubo; Yhanael	Na.Zu.Na	3:05
3.	"Candy Pop"	Min Lee "collapsedone"; Mayu Wakisaka	Min Lee "collapsedone"; Mayu Wakisaka	Min Lee "collapsedone"	3:22
4.	"L.O.V.E"	Na.Zu.Na; Yu-ki Kokubo; Yhanael	Na.Zu.Na; Yu-ki Kokubo; Yhanael	Na.Zu.Na	3:23
5.	"Wishing"	Eri Osanai	Albi Albertsson; Kanata Okajima	Mussashi	4:32
6.	"Say It Again"	Min Lee "collapsedone"; Mayu Wakisaka	Min Lee "collapsedone"; Mayu Wakisaka	Min Lee "collapsedone"	3:23
7.	"Wake Me Up"	Natsumi Watanabe	Atsushi Shimada; Louise Frick Sveen; Albin Nordqvist	Atsushi Shimada	3:33
8.	"Brand New Girl"	Na.Zu.Na; Yu-ki Kokubo	Na.Zu.Na; Michael Yano (M.I); Yu-ki Kokubo	Na.Zu.Na	3:34
9.	"Be as One"	Risa Horie	Kim Seung-soo; Choi Hyun-jun	Kim Seung-soo; Choi Hyun-jun	3:51
10.	"I Want You Back"	The Corporation – (Berry Gordy; Freddie Perren; Alphonso Mizell; Deke Richards)	The Corporation – (Berry Gordy; Freddie Perren; Alphonso Mizell; Deke Richards)	Yuichi Ohno	3:24
Total length:					35:24

BDZ — Physical album bonus tracks
No.	Title	Lyrics	Music	Arrangement	Length
11.	"Luv Me"	Yuka Matsumoto	Albin Nordqvist; Malin Johansson; Susumu Kawaguchi	Albin Nordqvist	3:29
12.	"Pink Lemonade"	Lauren Kaori; Yu-ki Kokubo	Lauren Kaori; Kohei Yokono	Kohei Yokono	3:40
Total length:					42:33

First press limited edition A DVD
No.	Title	Length
1.	"Twice Showcase Live Tour 2018 "Candy Pop" at NHK Hall"

First press limited edition B DVD
No.	Title	Length
1.	"BDZ" (Music video)
2.	"BDZ" (Music video making movie)
3.	"I Want You Back" (Music video)
4.	"I Want You Back" (Music video making movie)
5.	"I Want You Back" (Music video – Sensei Kunshu × Twice version)
6.	"Jacket shooting making movie"

Repackage standard edition
No.	Title	Lyrics	Music	Arrangement	Length
1.	"Stay by My Side"	Fredrik "Figge" Boström; Lauren Kaori; Malin Johansson	Atsushi Shimada; Fredrik "Figge" Boström; Malin Johansson	Atsushi Shimada	3:57
2.	"BDZ"	J.Y. Park "The Asiansoul"; Shoko Fujibayashi; Yu Shimoji	J.Y. Park "The Asiansoul"	J.Y. Park "The Asiansoul"; Hae Sol Lee	3:17
3.	"One More Time"	Natsumi Watanabe; Yhanael	Na.Zu.Na; Yu-ki Kokubo; Yhanael	Na.Zu.Na	3:05
4.	"Candy Pop"	Min Lee "collapsedone"; Mayu Wakisaka	Min Lee "collapsedone"; Mayu Wakisaka	Min Lee "collapsedone"	3:22
5.	"L.O.V.E"	Na.Zu.Na; Yu-ki Kokubo; Yhanael	Na.Zu.Na; Yu-ki Kokubo; Yhanael	Na.Zu.Na	3:23
6.	"Wishing"	Eri Osanai	Albi Albertsson; Kanata Okajima	Mussashi	4:32
7.	"Say It Again"	Min Lee "collapsedone"; Mayu Wakisaka	Min Lee "collapsedone"; Mayu Wakisaka	Min Lee "collapsedone"	3:23
8.	"Wake Me Up"	Natsumi Watanabe	Atsushi Shimada; Louise Frick Sveen; Albin Nordqvist	Atsushi Shimada	3:33
9.	"Brand New Girl"	Na.Zu.Na; Yu-ki Kokubo	Na.Zu.Na; Michael Yano (M.I); Yu-ki Kokubo	Na.Zu.Na	3:34
10.	"Be as One"	Risa Horie	Kim Seung-soo; Choi Hyun-jun	Kim Seung-soo; Choi Hyun-jun	3:51
11.	"I Want You Back"	The Corporation – (Berry Gordy; Freddie Perren; Alphonso Mizell; Deke Richards)	The Corporation – (Berry Gordy; Freddie Perren; Alphonso Mizell; Deke Richards)	Yuichi Ohno	3:24
Total length:					39:21

Repackage album bonus tracks
No.	Title	Lyrics	Music	Arrangement	Length
12.	"Luv Me"	Yuka Matsumoto	Albin Nordqvist; Malin Johansson; Susumu Kawaguchi	Albin Nordqvist	3:29
13.	"Pink Lemonade"	Lauren Kaori; Yu-ki Kokubo	Lauren Kaori; Kohei Yokono	Kohei Yokono	3:40
Total length:					46:30

Repackage first press limited edition DVD
No.	Title	Length
1.	"Stay by My Side" (Making music video)
2.	"Jacket shooting making movie"
3.	"Twice Showcase Live Tour 2018 "Candy Pop"" (Making movie)

== Personnel ==
Credits adapted from CD album liner notes.

JYP Entertainment staff

- Song Ji-eun "Shannen" (JYP Entertainment Japan) – executive producer
- Jimmy Jeong (JYP Entertainment) – executive producer
- Cho Hae-sung (JYP Entertainment) – executive producer
- J. Y. Park "The Asiansoul" – producer
- Min Lee "collapsedone" – assistant producer
- Kim Seung-soo – assistant producer
- Park Nam-yong (JYP Entertainment) – performance director
- Kim Hyung-woong (JYP Entertainment) – performance director
- Yun Hee-so (JYP Entertainment) – performance director
- Na Tae-hoon (JYP Entertainment) – performance director
- Yoo Kwang-yeol (JYP Entertainment) – performance director
- Kang Da-sol (JYP Entertainment) – performance director
- Park Gyeong-seok (JYP Entertainment) – performance director
- Sim Kyu-jin (JYP Entertainment) – performance director
- Bock Mi-ran (JYP Entertainment) – performance director
- Lee Tae-sub (JYP Entertainment) – recording engineer
- Choi Hye-jin (JYP Entertainment) – recording engineer
- Eom Se-hee (JYP Entertainment) – recording engineer
- Lim Hong-jin (JYP Entertainment) – recording engineer
- Jang Han-soo (JYP Entertainment) – recording engineer
- No Min-ji (JYP Entertainment) – recording engineer
- Lee Sang-yeop (JYP Entertainment) – recording engineer

Japanese recording staff

- Goei Ito (Obelisk) – music director
- Yu-ki Kokubo (Obelisk) – recording director
- Satoshi Sasamoto – Pro Tools operation
- Manubu Ohta – Pro Tools operation

Design staff

- Toshiyuki Suzuki (United Lounge Tokyo) – art direction
- Yasuhiro Ueda (United Lounge Tokyo) – design
- Tommy – photography
- Choi Hee-sun (F. Choi) - style director
- Seo Ji-eun (F. Choi) - style director
- Lee Ga-young (F. Choi) - style director
- Lee Jin-young (F. Choi) - assistant stylist
- Noh Hee-ha (F. Choi) - assistant stylist
- Jung Nan-young (Lulu Hair Makeup Studio) – hair director
- Choi Ji-young (Lulu Hair Makeup Studio) – hair director
- Son Eun-hee (Lulu Hair Makeup Studio) – hair director
- Jo Sang-ki (Lulu Hair Makeup Studio) – makeup director
- Jeon Dallae (Lulu Hair Makeup Studio) – makeup director
- Zia (Lulu Hair Makeup Studio) – makeup director
- Won Jung-yo (Bit&Boot) – makeup director
- Choi Su-ji (Bit&Boot) – assistant makeup director
- Naoyuki Hashimoto (Magenta Wall Design Inc. Tokyo) – production designer
- Yuzo Morota – production manager

Other personnel

- J. Y. Park "The Asiansoul" – all instruments (on "BDZ")
- Hae Sol Lee – all instruments and computer programming (on "BDZ")
- Jaepil Jung – guitars (on "BDZ" and "One More Time")
- Twice – background vocals
- Ikuko Tsutsumi – background vocals
- Dr. Jo – vocal recording director (on "BDZ")
- Tony Maserati – mixing engineer (on "BDZ", "One More Time", "Candy Pop", "Wake Me Up")
- Chris Gehringer – mastering engineer
- Na.Zu.Na – all instruments (on "BDZ", "One More Time", "L.O.V.E", "Brand New Girl")
- Min Lee "collapsedone" – all instruments and computer programming (on "Candy Pop" and "Say it Again")
- Mayu Wakisaka – background vocals and vocal recording director (on "Candy Pop" and "Say it Again")
- Naoki Yamada – mixing engineer (on "L.O.V.E", "Wishing", "Brand New Girl", "I Want You Back")
- Mussashi (Albi Albertsson) – all instruments (on "Wishing")
- Brian – recording engineer (on "Wishing")
- Shin Bong-won – mixing engineer (on "Say it Again")
- Atsushi Shimada – all instruments (on "Wake Me Up")
- Kim Seung-soo – all instruments (on "Be as One")
- Choi Hyun-jun – all instruments and vocal recording director (on "Be as One")
- Chung Soo-wan – guitars (on "Be as One")
- Jo Jun-sung – mixing engineer (on "Be as One")
- Yuichi Ohno – all instruments except guitars (on "I Want You Back")
- Akitoshi Kuroda – guitars (on "I Want You Back")

=== Locations ===
Recording

- JYPE Studios, Seoul, South Korea (all songs except "Wishing")
- U Production Studio, Seoul, South Korea ("Wishing")

Mixing

- Mirrorball Studios, North Hollywood, California ("BDZ", "One More Time", "Candy Pop", "Wake Me Up")
- I to I Communications, Tokyo, Japan ("L.O.V.E", "Wishing", "Brand New Girl", "I Want You Back")
- MusicLab Busan Studios, Busan, South Korea ("Say it Again")
- WSound, Seoul, South Korea ("Be as One")

Mastering

- Sterling Sound, New York City, New York

== Charts ==
=== Weekly charts ===
Chart (2018)	Peak position
Japan Hot Albums (Billboard)	1
Japanese Albums (Oricon)	1
Japanese Digital Albums (Oricon)	1

=== Year-end charts ===
Chart (2018)	Position
Japan Hot Albums (Billboard)	12
Japanese Albums (Oricon)	8

Chart (2019)	Position
Japan Hot Albums (Billboard)	66
Japanese Albums (Oricon)	60

== Certifications ==
Region	Certification	Certified units/sales
Japan (RIAJ)	Platinum	250,000^{^}
^{^} Shipments figures based on certification alone.

== Accolades ==
Year	Award	Category	Result	Ref.
2019	33rd Japan Gold Disc Award	Best 3 Albums (Asia)	Won	
