= List of M Countdown Chart winners (2019) =

Winners of South Korean music program M Countdown

M Countdown Chart winners (2019)

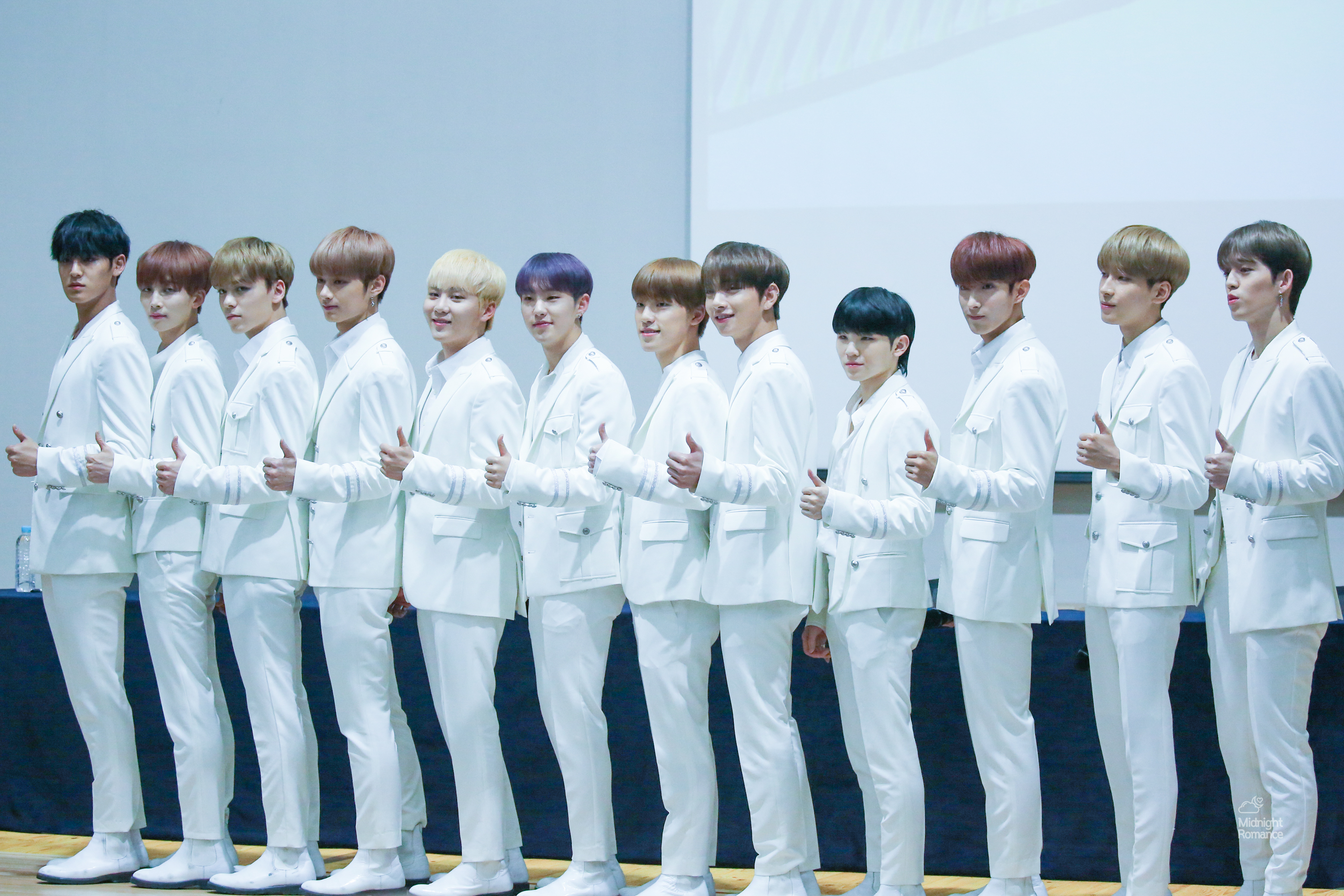
Seventeen achieved their first ever music show triple crown for "Home" on episode 606.

X1 won their first M Countdown trophy for their debut single "Flash", and achieved the second triple crown of the year, on episode 633.

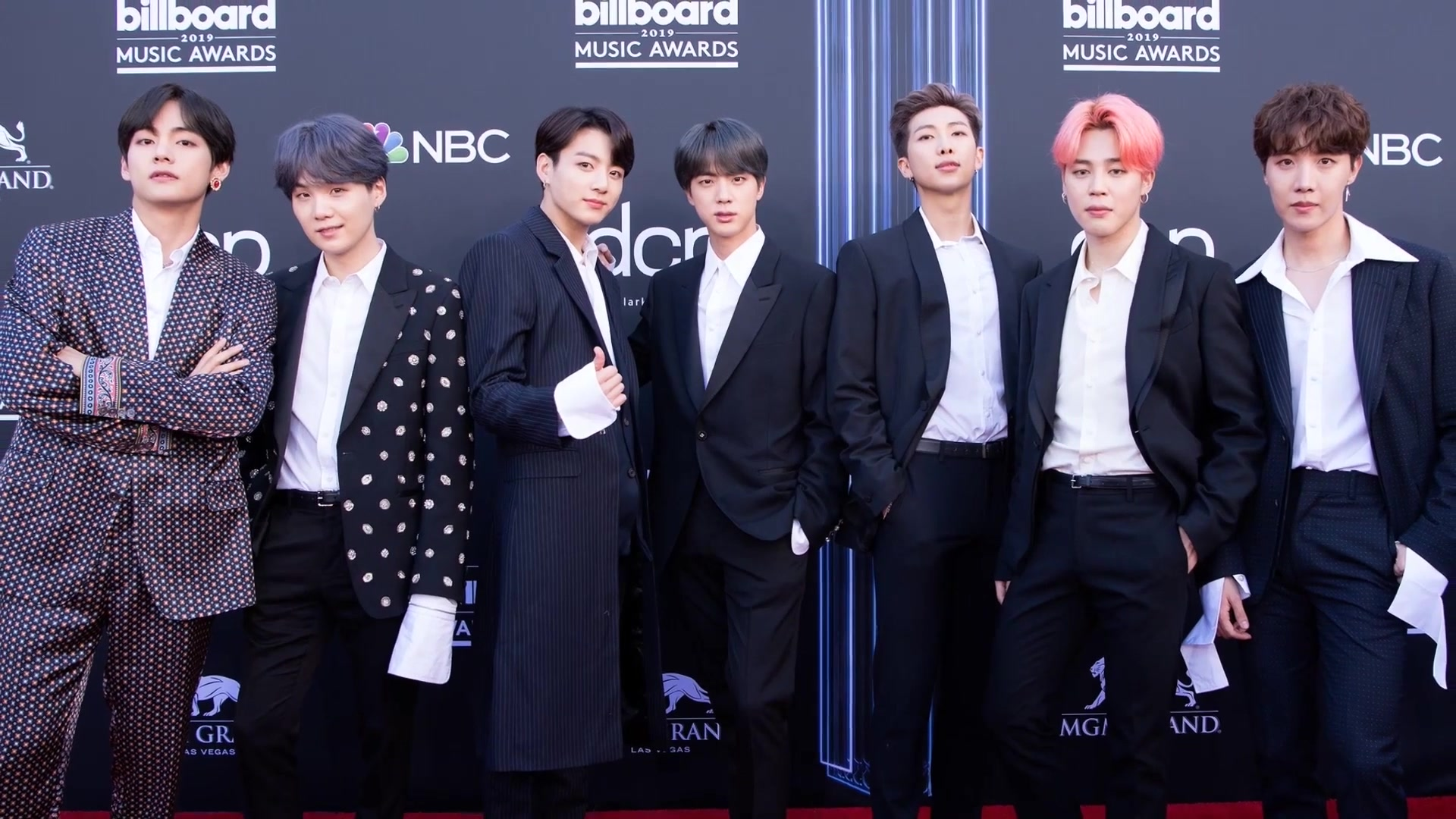
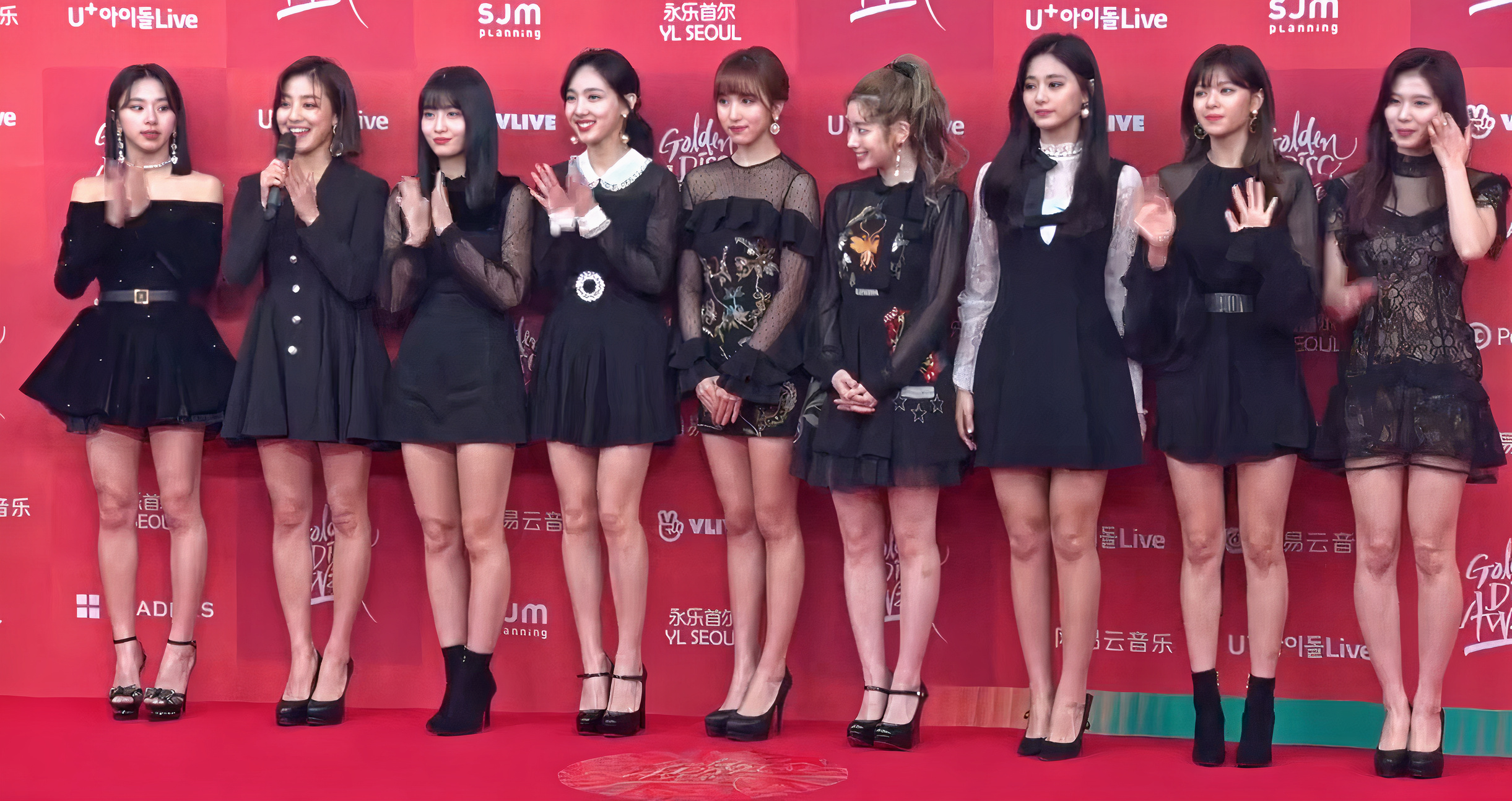
"Boy with Luv" by BTS (top) and "Fancy" by Twice (bottom) earned the first two perfect scores of the year, on episodes 616 and 617 respectively.

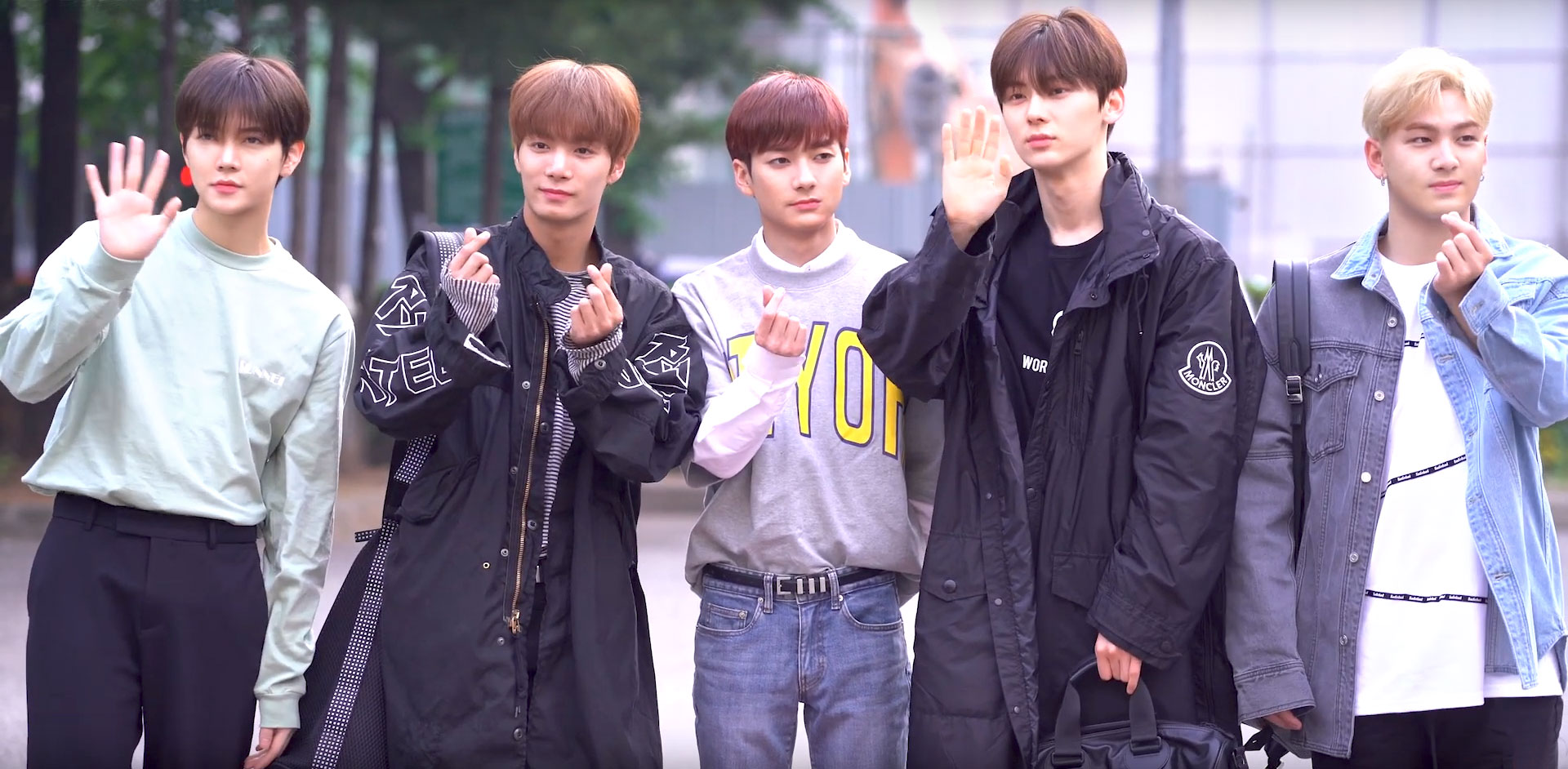
NU'EST won their first M Countdown trophy as a group for "Bet Bet", and earned the third perfect score of the year, on episode 618.

The M Countdown Chart is a record chart on the South Korean Mnet television music program M Countdown. Every week, the show awards the best-performing single on the chart in the country during its live broadcast.

In 2019, 36 singles ranked number one on the chart and 25 music acts were awarded first-place trophies. Two songs collected trophies for three weeks and achieved a triple crown: "Home" by Seventeen and "Flash" by X1. Of all releases for the year, only three songs earned a perfect score of 11,000 points: "Boy with Luv" by BTS, "Fancy" by Twice, and "Bet Bet" by NU'EST.

== Scoring system ==
Songs were judged based on a combination of digital music sales (45%), album sales (15%), social media performance (official YouTube music video views and SNS buzz: 20%), global fan votes (10%), Mnet's broadcast score (10%), and a live SMS vote (10%) that took place during the show.

== Chart history ==
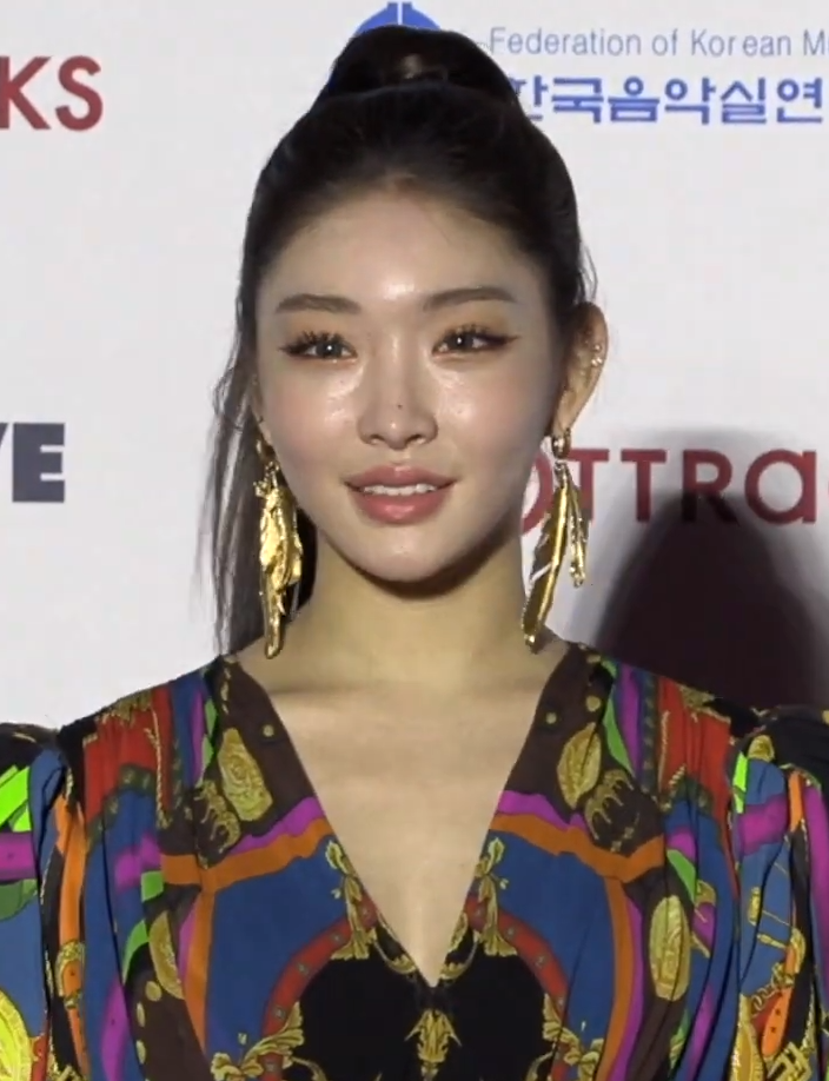
Chungha received her first M Countdown trophy as a soloist with "Gotta Go" on episode 601.

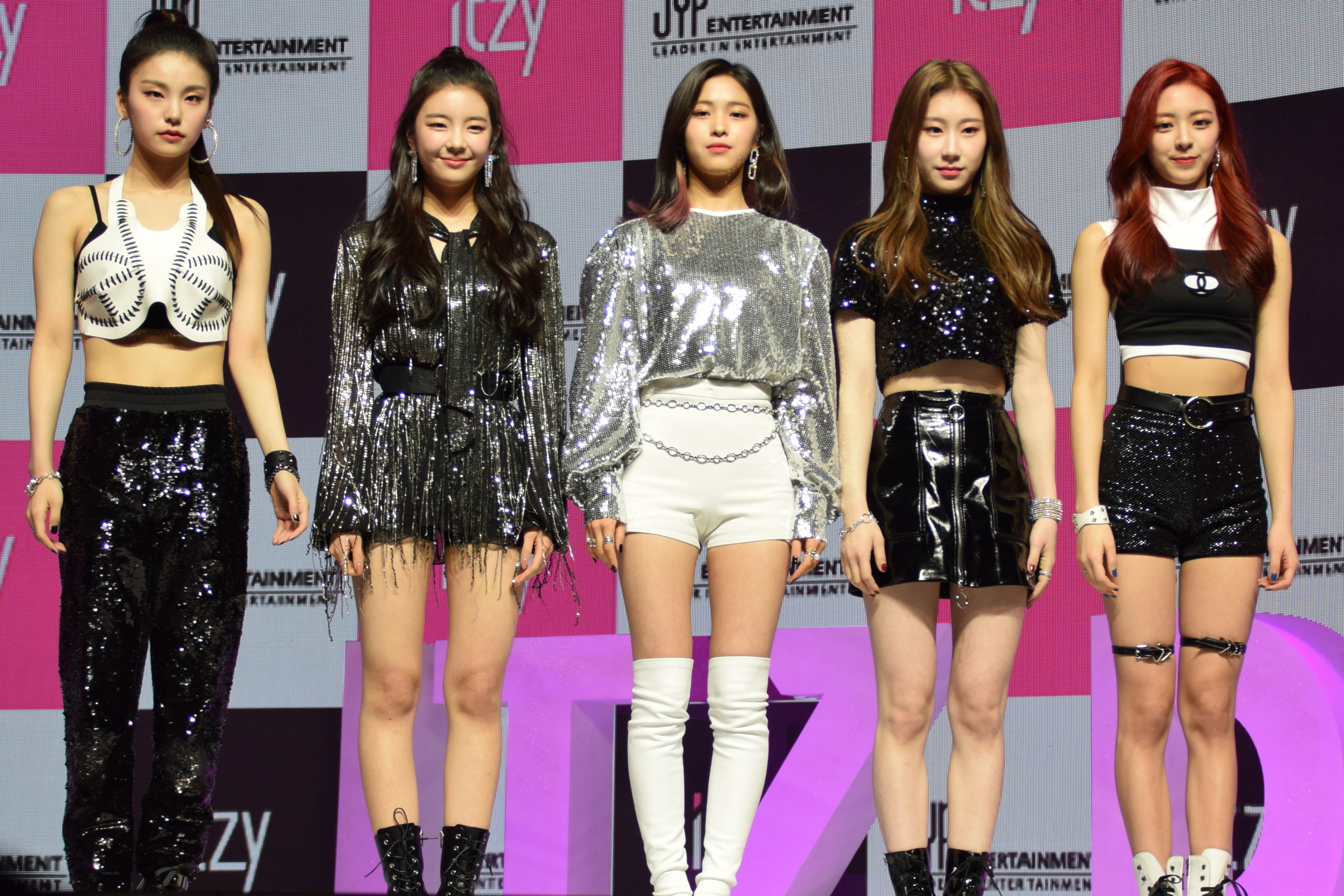
Itzy received their first ever music show win on M Countdown for their debut single "Dalla Dalla" on episode 607.

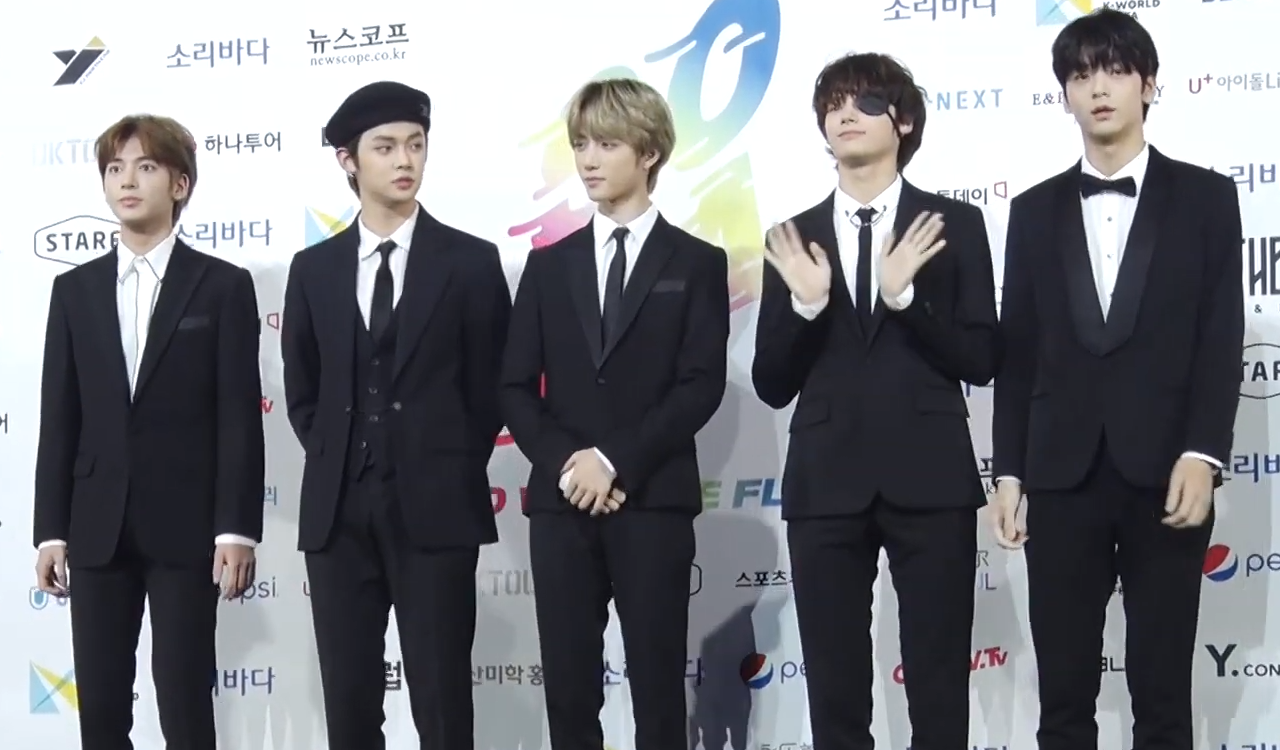
TXT received their first M Countdown trophy for their debut single "Crown" on episode 610.

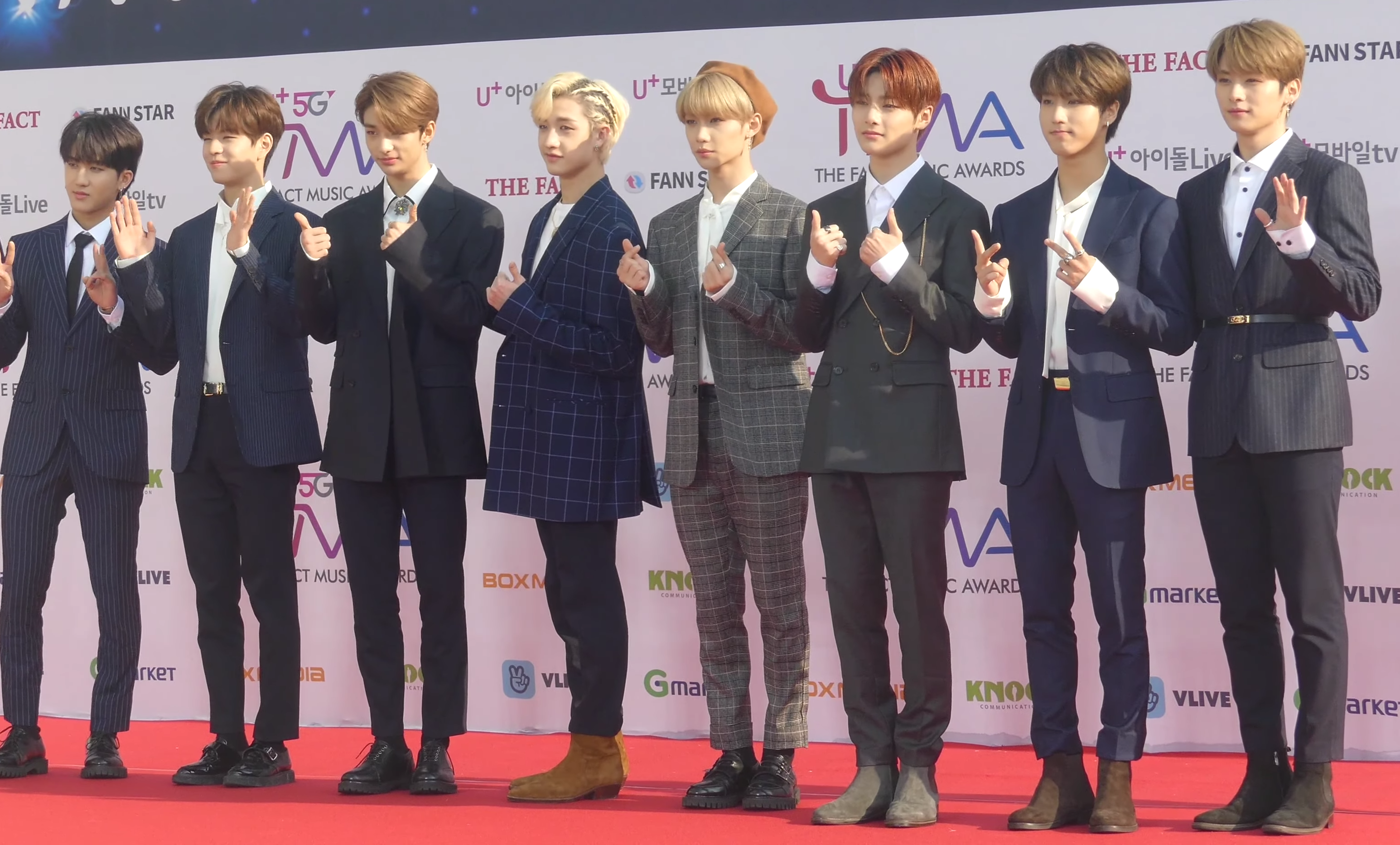
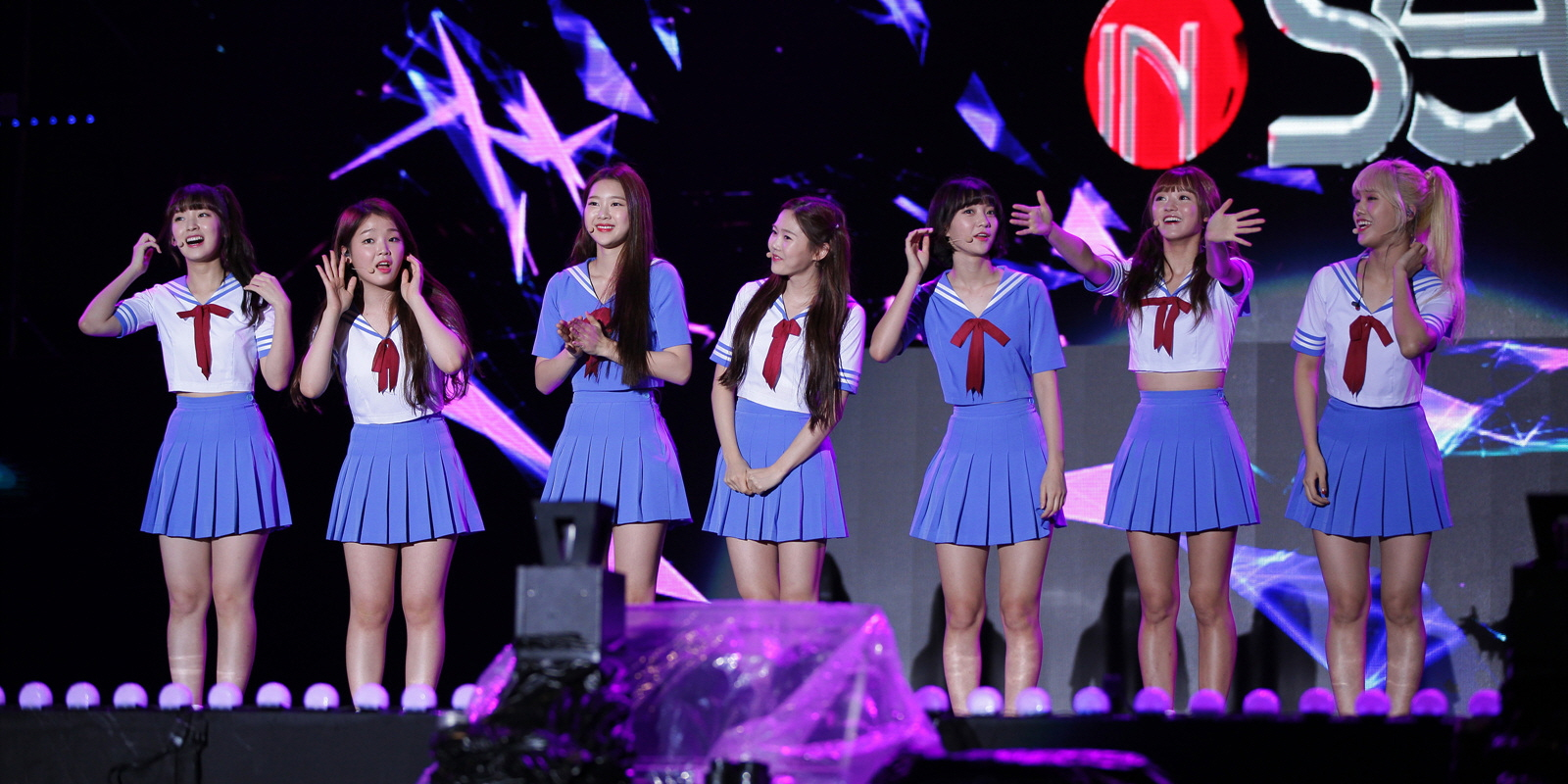
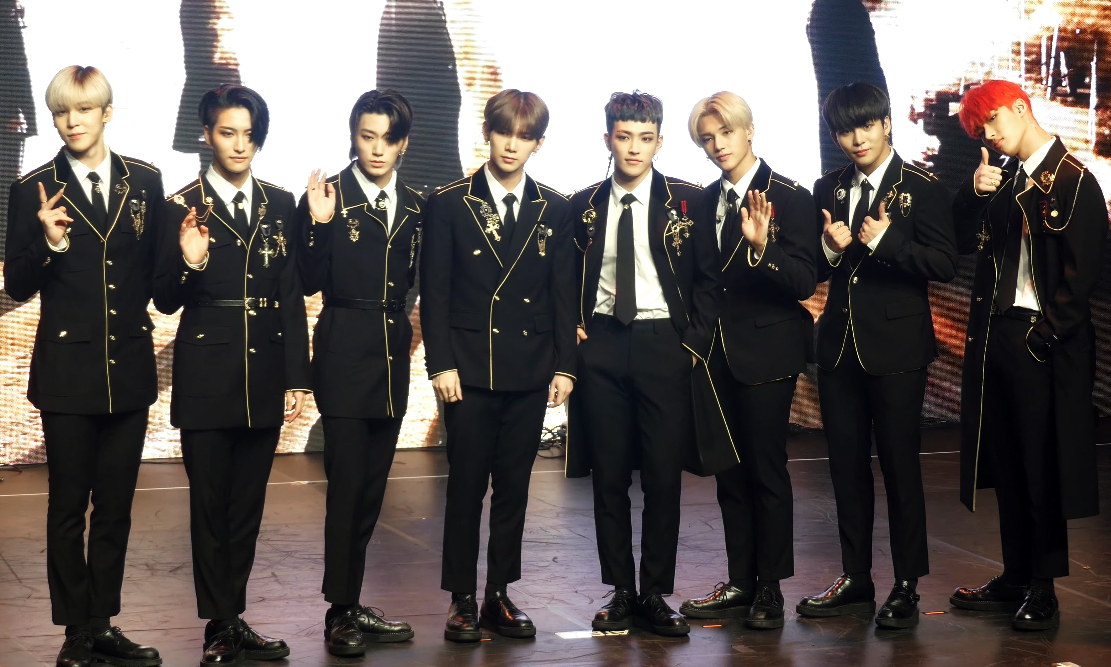
Stray Kids (top), Oh My Girl (centre), and Ateez (bottom) achieved their first-ever music show wins on M Countdown on episodes 613 with "Miroh", 619 with "The Fifth Season (SSFWL)", and 624 with "Wave" respectively.
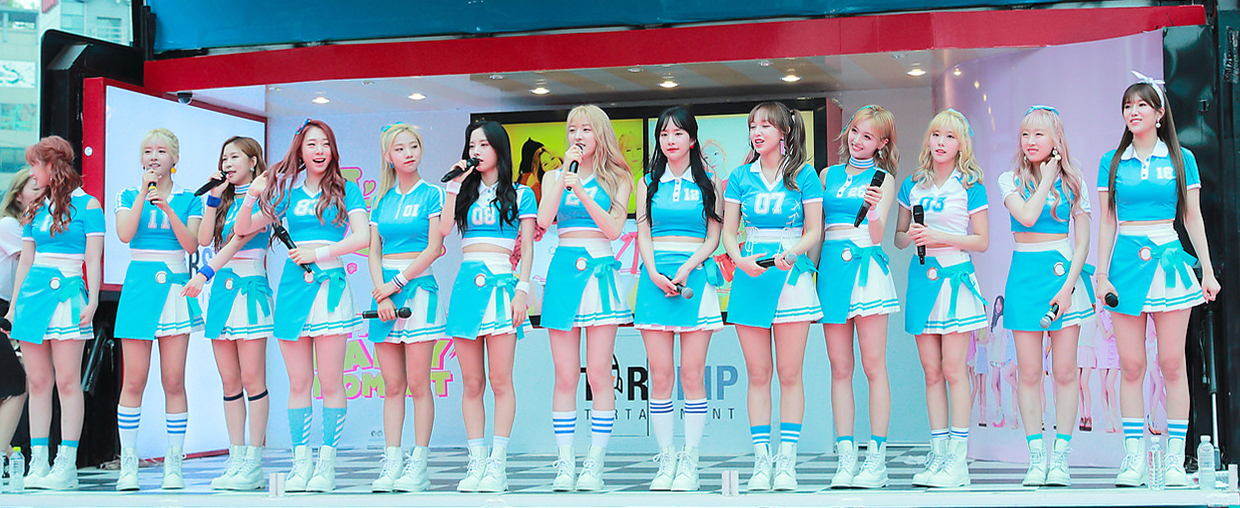
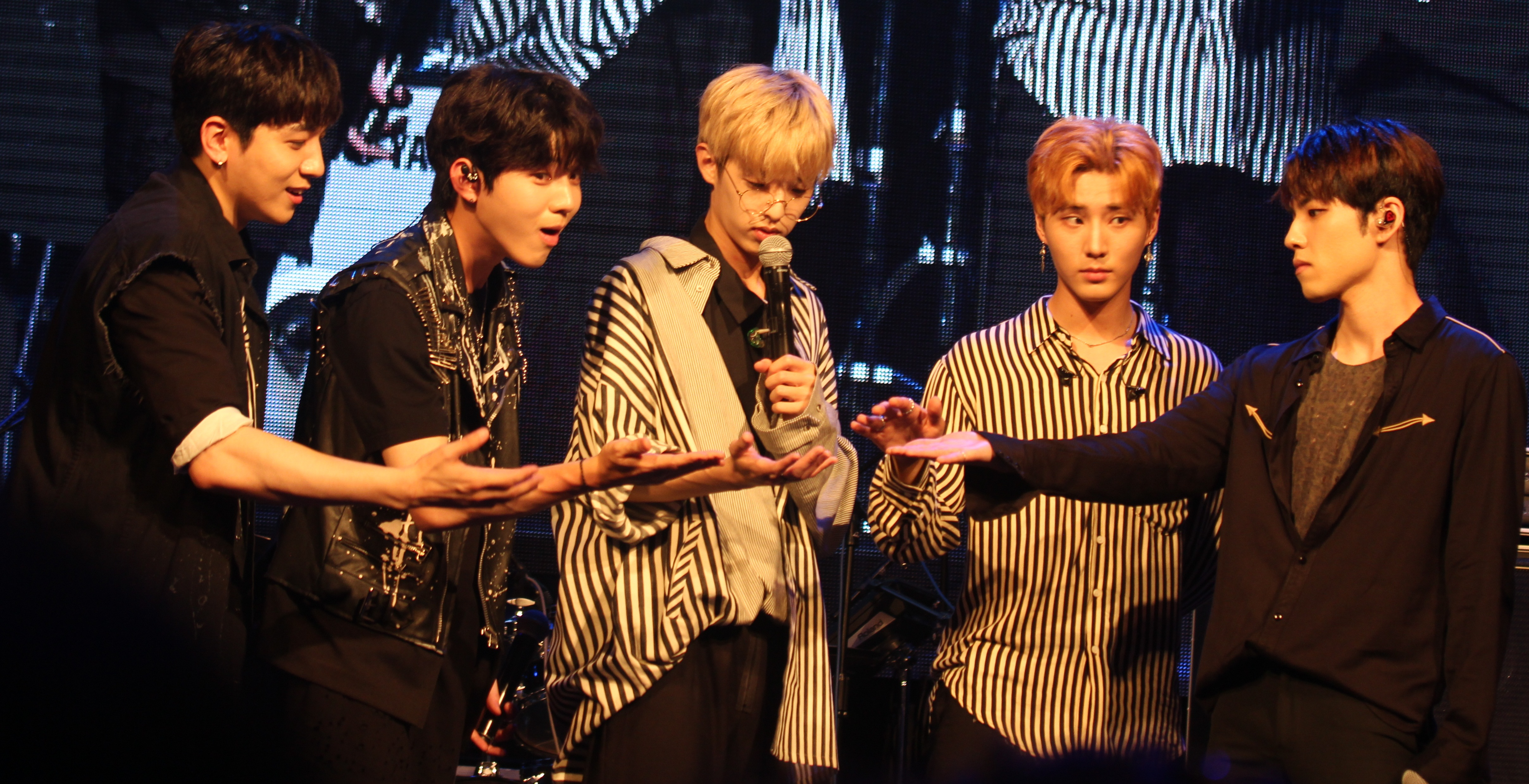
Cosmic Girls (top) and Day6 (bottom) each won for the first time on episodes 623 and 629 with "Boogie Up" and "Time of Our Life" respectively.
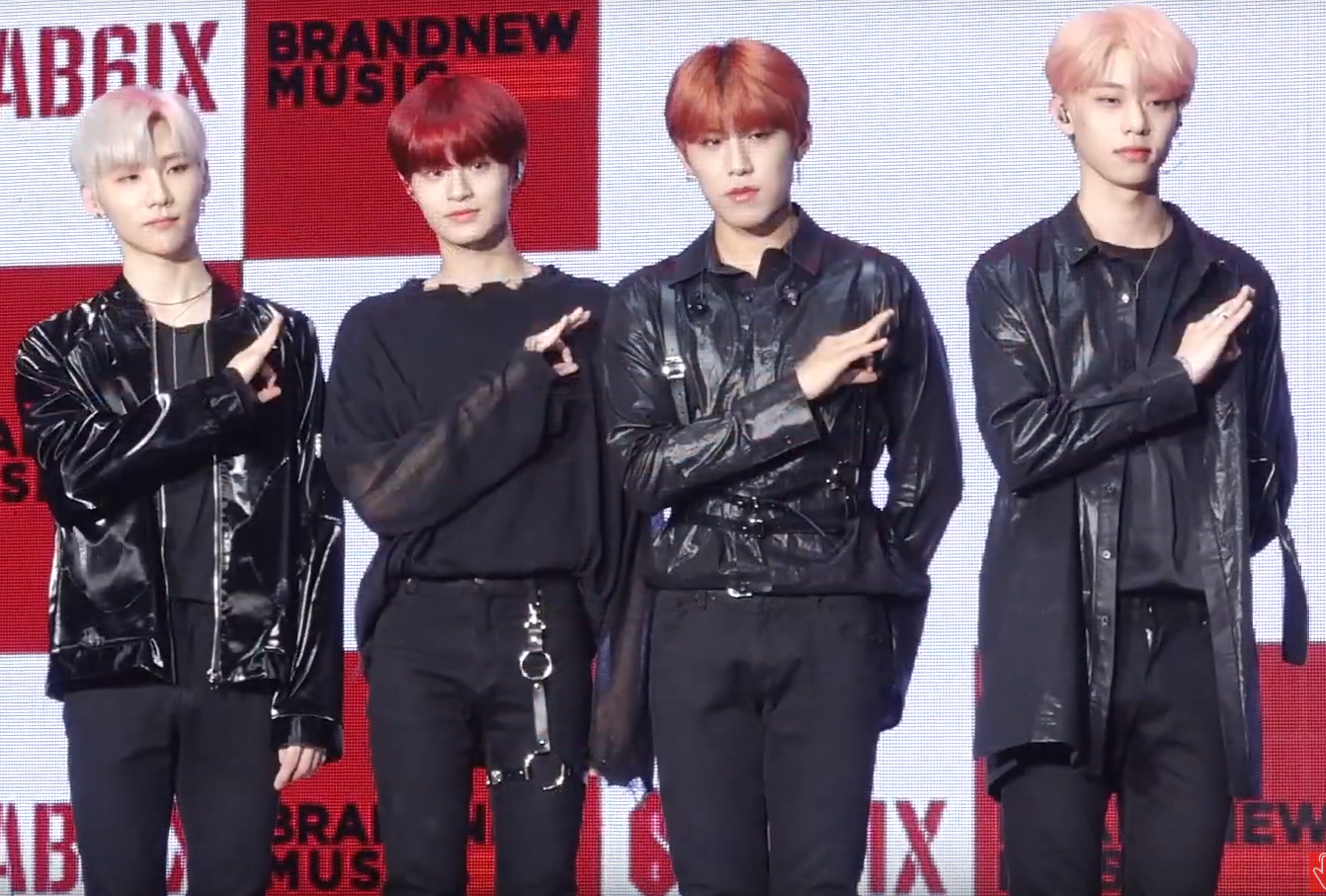
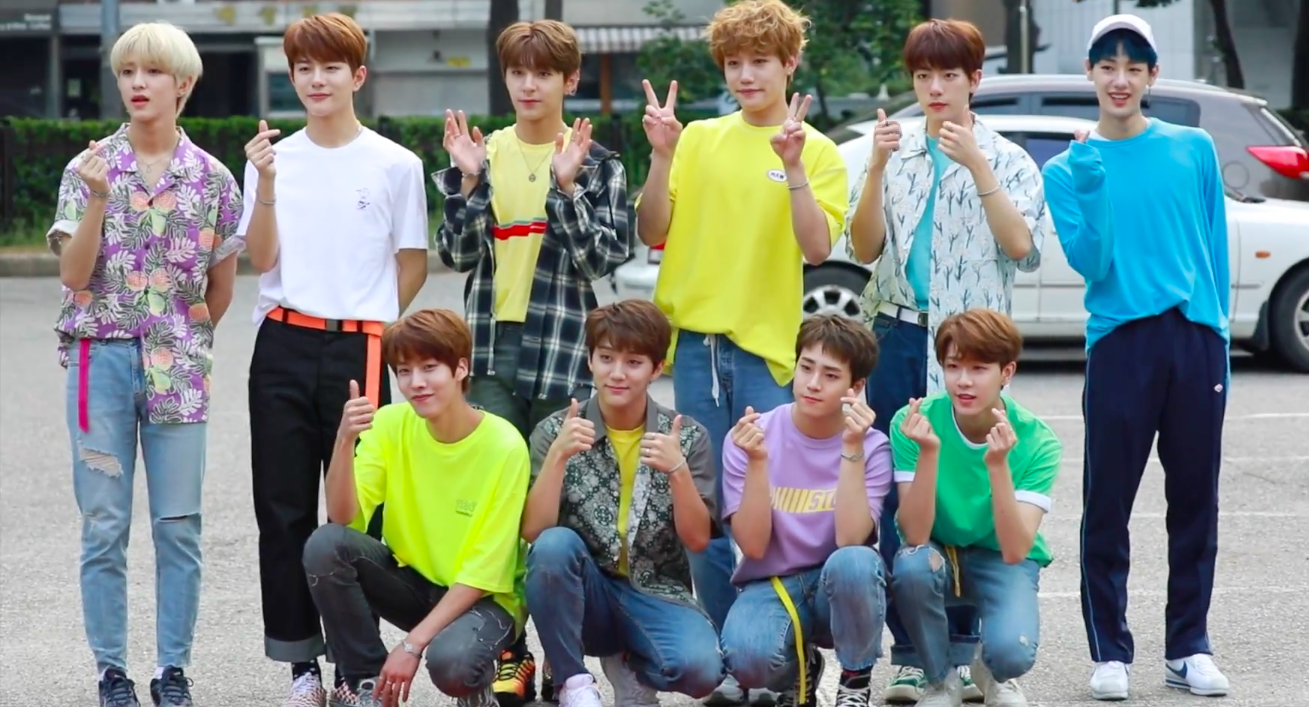
AB6IX (top) and Golden Child (bottom) received their first ever M Countdown trophies on episodes 639 and 646 with "Blind For Love" and "Wannabe" respectively.

Key
	Triple Crown
	Highest score of the year
—	No show was held

Episode	Date	Artist	Song	Points	Ref.
600	January 3	Winner	"Millions"	N/A	
601	January 10	Chungha	"Gotta Go"	9,389	
602	January 17	Apink	"%% (Eung Eung)"	7,829	
603	January 24	GFriend	"Sunrise"	7,653	
604	January 31	Seventeen	"Home"	9,676	
605	February 7	Seventeen	"Home"	N/A	
606	February 14	Seventeen	"Home"	6,669	
607	February 21	Itzy	"Dalla Dalla"	8,527	
608	February 28	Monsta X	"Alligator"	6,801	
609	March 7	Itzy	"Dalla Dalla"	6,800	
610	March 14	TXT	"Crown"	7,612	
611	March 21	Mamamoo	"Gogobebe"	9,386	
612	March 28	Mamamoo	"Gogobebe"	9,907	
613	April 4	Stray Kids	"Miroh"	5,870	
614	April 11	Iz*One	"Violeta"	10,775	
615	April 18	Iz*One	"Violeta"	10,446	
616	April 25	BTS	"Boy with Luv"	11,000	
617	May 2	Twice	"Fancy"	11,000	
618	May 9	NU'EST	"Bet Bet"	11,000	
619	May 16	Oh My Girl	"The Fifth Season (SSFWL)"	8,117	
620	May 23	Winner	"Ah Yeah"	9,245	
621	May 30	Got7	"Eclipse"	N/A	
622	June 6	Lee Hi	"No One"	6,663	
623	June 13	Cosmic Girls	"Boogie Up"	6,615	
624	June 20	Ateez	"Wave"	5,482	
625	June 27	Red Velvet	"Zimzalabim"	9,881	
626	July 4	Chungha	"Snapping"	9,025	
627	July 11	GFriend	"Fever"	7,890	
628	July 18	Chungha	"Snapping"	7,210	
629	July 25	Day6	"Time of Our Life"	N/A	
—	August 1	No Broadcast or Winner			
630	August 8	Itzy	"Icy"	8,087	
—	August 15	No Broadcast or Winner			
631	August 22	Itzy	"Icy"	7,356	
632	August 29	Red Velvet	"Umpah Umpah"	9,282	
633	September 5	X1	"Flash"	8,629	
634	September 12	X1	"Flash"	N/A	
635	September 19	X1	"Flash"	10,945	
636	September 26	Seventeen	"Fear"	10,800	
637	October 3	Twice	"Feel Special"	8,815	
638	October 10	Twice	"Feel Special"	9,222	
639	October 17	AB6IX	"Blind For Love"	N/A	
640	October 24	Super Junior	"Super Clap"	8,204	
641	October 31	NU'EST	"Love Me"	6,959	
642	November 7	Monsta X	"Follow"	6,427	
—	November 14	No Broadcast or Winner			
643	November 21	Mamamoo	"Hip"	N/A	
644	November 28	Mamamoo	"Hip"	N/A	
—	December 5	MAMA Special Broadcast, winners were not announced			
—	December 12	No Broadcast or Winner			
645	December 19	Stray Kids	"Levanter"	N/A	
646	December 26	Golden Child	"Wannabe"	N/A	
"—" denotes an episode did not air that week.
