= List of Project 7 contestants =

Project 7 is a South Korean survival reality television show. The show began with 100 contestants, and the public voted on which to include in a seven-member boy band.

== Contestants ==
The English names of contestants are presented in Eastern order in accordance with the official website.

The ages of all contestants are presented in accordance with the international age system as of Episode 1 (October 18, 2024).

Color key

Final members of Close Your Eyes
Contestants eliminated in the final episode (Ep. 12)
Contestants eliminated at the third assembly ceremony (Ep. 11)
Contestants eliminated at the second assembly ceremony (Ep. 8)
Contestants eliminated at the first assembly ceremony (Ep. 5)
Contestants that left the show
Top 7 contestants of the Episode

Company	Name	Age	Masters' evaluation	Ranking																								
Company	Name	Age	Masters' evaluation	Ep. 2 (Note: As of October 18, 2024, at 21:00 KST.)	Ep. 3 (Note: As of October 25, 2024, at 21:00 KST.)	Episode 5 (Note: A livestream entitled 1st Survivor Announcement Ceremony revealed the rankings of the surviving contestants of the first round.)				Ep. 6 (Note: As of November 15, 2024, at 21:00 KST.)	Episode 8 (Note: A livestream entitled 2nd Survivor Announcement Ceremony revealed the rankings of the surviving contestants of the second round.)				Ep. 9 (Note: As of December 6, 2024, at 21:00 KST.)	Episode 11 (Note: A livestream entitled 3rd Survivor Announcement Ceremony revealed the rankings of the surviving contestants of the third round.)				Interim (Note: As of December 24, 2024, at 10:00 KST.)	Episode 12							Final
Company	Name	Age	Ep. 2 (Note: Rank Test.)	#	#	#	Votes		Points	#	#	Votes		Points	#	#	Votes		Points	#	Votes		Live Bias Votes		Live Assemble Votes		Points	Final
Company	Name	Age	Ep. 2	#	#	#	Korean	Global	Points	#	#	Korean	Global	Points	#	#	Korean	Global	Points	#	Korean	Global	Korean	Global	Korean	Global	Points	Final
TNK Entertainment (TNK 엔터테인먼트)	Abe Yura (阿部由良) / (아베 유라) (Note: Abe Yura, Asaka Kotaro, Oh Tae-hwan and Yoo Hyeon-seung were contestant on Fan Pick.) (Note: Abe Yura, Asaka Kotaro and Yoo Hyeon-seung are members of PICKUS.)	19	B	34	22	21	361,087	559,022	920,109	18	19	386,711	601,342	1,008,053	Not Shown	26	216,588	296,569	513,157	Eliminated								26
Individual Trainee (개인 연습생)	Ahn Jun-won (안준원)	25	C	27	16	15	653,118	536,650	1,189,768	11	10	862,424	544,986	1,427,410	Not Shown	11	698,154	325,564	1,073,709	Not Shown	23,951	179,863	83,750	61,442	591,542	641,440	1,581,988	16
Mystic Story (미스틱스토리)	Andy (앤디)	17	S	60	17	19	258,786	727,593	986,379	22	18	316,670	695,000	1,041,670	Not Shown	15	286,626	495,013	859,803	Not Shown	85,679	84,527	14,450	51,042	436,722	830,888	1,503,308	19
Escrow Entertainment (에스크로엔터테인먼트)	Aom (ออม) / (어엄) (Note: Aom was a member of XI.)	20	A	72	65	68	85,756	82,571	168,327	45	48	146,327	149,217	305,545	Eliminated													48
TNK Entertainment (TNK 엔터테인먼트)	Asaka Kotaro (浅香光太郎) / (아사카 코타로)	21	C	29	35	29	168,161	207,342	375,503	35	28	211,460	232,276	483,736	Not Shown	35	141,491	134,795	276,286	Eliminated								35
Individual Trainees (개인 연습생)	Ayalon Adam (아야론 아담)	19	B	36	42	50	119,786	127,644	247,430	66	67	114,950	134,423	199,374	Eliminated													67
Individual Trainees (개인 연습생)	Baek Ji-ho (백지호)	20	C	53	48	55	113,975	104,830	218,805	70	57	170,567	147,490	253,056	Eliminated													57
Individual Trainees (개인 연습생)	Bing Hua (谢秉桦) / (빙화)	22	B	8	11	9	867,770	811,113	1,698,883	10	11	749,110	642,938	1,422,048	Not Shown	12	514,044	427,780	941,824	Not Shown	80,375	250,676	55,724	94,908	480,362	688,732	1,650,777	15
COMMAND THE-M Entertainment	Chae Hee-ju (채희주) (Note: Chae Hee-ju, Choi Byung-hoon and Lee No-yul are members of CMDM.)	21	B	42	45	43	144,707	124,509	289,216	41	31	262,392	153,664	466,056	Not Shown	28	351,197	121,022	472,219	Eliminated								28
Nature Space (자연 공간)	Cho Hyo-jin (조효진) (Note: Cho Hyo-jin was a member of Eight.) (Note: Cho Hyo-jin and Ha Seok-hee were contestant on Stars Awakening.) (Note: Cho Hyo-jin, Kim Young-hoon and Kwon Ye-ung are members of VI'ENX.)	27	S	59	62	58	146,696	50,495	197,191	60	49	192,724	128,793	301,517	Eliminated													49
COMMAND THE-M Entertainment	Choi Byung-hoon (최병훈) (Note: Choi Byung-hoon, Im Si-u and Kim Si-hun were contestant on Produce X 101.)	24	B	75	80	90	80,887	44,951	125,838	Eliminated																		90
Individual Trainee (개인 연습생)	Choi Ju-young (최주영)	15	B	66	50	52	174,025	63,275	237,300	49	58	202,836	99,401	247,237	Eliminated													58
TVB	Fong Atilla (方玉亨) / (팡아틸라) (Note: Fong Atilla was a contestant on Asia Super Young.)	16	S	37	12	13	582,702	998,129	1,580,831	20	22	341,059	551,025	842,048	24	24	208,896	349,159	558,055	Eliminated								24
Individual Trainees (개인 연습생)	Fukuyama Sota (후쿠야마 소타)	18	B	12	20	23	460,193	283,814	744,007	27	37	293,024	120,043	423,367	Eliminated													37
Individual Trainees (개인 연습생)	Ha Seok-hee (하석희) (Note: Ha Seok-hee was a member of Kairos.) (Note: Ha Seok-hee, Jeong Deun-haesol, Kang Hyun-woo, Kang Min-seo, Lee Han-bin and Oh Seung-chan were contestant on Fantasy Boys.) (Note: Ha Seok-hee is a member of Celest1a.)	24	B	26	43	41	215,961	81,992	317,953	29	38	306,782	144,039	420,821	Eliminated													38
TOV Entertainment (엔터테인먼트)	Hou Guanyi (侯冠一) / (허우관이)	25	B	46	59	69	113,032	52,537	163,569	50	62	165,064	95,189	220,254	Eliminated													62
Individual Trainees (개인 연습생)	Im Si-u (임시우)	25	C	47	56	60	157,010	36,069	193,079	53	55	225,885	86,187	262,072	Eliminated													55
Individual Trainees (개인 연습생)	Jang Hyeon-seok (장현석)	18	B	81	87	87	98,007	33,842	131,849	Eliminated																		87
Individual Trainees (개인 연습생)	Jang In-jae (장인재)	16	B	90	99	92	85,494	35,297	120,791	Eliminated																		92
Mystic Story (미스틱스토리)	Jang Yeo-jun (장여준) (Note: Jang Yeo-jun and Park Chan-yong were contestant on Extreme Debut: Wild Idol.) (Note: Jang Yeo-jun, Jung Se-yun and Ma Jingxiang were contestant on Boys Planet.)	19	A	15	6	6	977,033	1,221,266	2,218,299	4	4	1,256,570	1,245,725	2,542,295	Not Shown	7	974,447	901,431	1,875,878	8	455,726	753,352	209,322	244,250	1,122,014	1,242,574	4,027,238	6
PocketDol Studio (포켓돌스튜디오)	Jeon Min-wook (전민욱) (Note: Jeon Min-wook, Kim Hyun-woo, Park Jun-seo and Yoo Young-seo are members of BAE173.) (Note: Jeon Min-wook, Kim Hyun-jae, Kim Hyun-woo, Kim Si-hun, Park Jun-seo, Yoo Hee-do, Yoo Young-seo and Yu Ji-ahn were contestants on Peak Time.)	25	A	1	1	1	2,413,947	1,746,093	4,260,040	2	1	2,010,216	1,315,938	3,396,154	Not Shown	3	1,808,821	1,270,116	3,078,937	Not Shown	278,687	1,090,557	244,574	241,718	1,748,974	1,449,452	5,053,962	3
Individual Trainee (개인 연습생)	Jeong Deun-haesol (정든해솔)	17	A	45	68	62	121,985	42,187	184,172	59	68	173,466	87,910	190,497	Eliminated													68
Stardust Entertainment (砾子星尘文化传媒有限公司)	Jung Jo-han (高浚涵) / (정요한)	25	C	Left the show																								100
Hi-Hat Entertainment (하이헷 주식회사)	Jung Se-yun (정세윤)	17	A	14	19	17	587,571	543,847	1,131,418	19	21	492,367	441,995	874,362	Not Shown	19	431,356	258,411	758,744	Not Shown	34,239	47,226	21,456	18,840	645,160	742,188	1,509,109	18
JG Entertainment	Jung Seung-won (정승원)	20	C	73	53	57	181,145	35,261	216,406	54	40	287,896	48,833	386,729	Eliminated													40
ICE Entertainment	Kang Hee-min (강희민) (Note: Kang Hee-min is a member of Half&Half.)	23	B	88	79	80	122,404	25,995	148,399	Eliminated																		80
Individual Trainees (개인 연습생)	Kang Hyun-woo (강현우) (Note: Kang Hyun-woo, Kim Jeong-min and Kim Tae-sung were contestant on Loud.)	24	A	7	9	8	875,676	836,260	1,701,936	13	14	669,774	602,882	1,282,656	Not Shown	17	427,510	359,687	787,197	Not Shown	159,839	275,569	42,914	90,782	655,138	1,089,296	2,313,538	10
Individual Trainees (개인 연습생)	Kang Ji-min (강지민)	16	S	49	54	56	181,250	35,545	216,795	63	65	189,898	58,301	208,199	Eliminated													65
PocketDol Studio (포켓돌스튜디오)	Kang Min-seo (강민서) (Note: Kang Min-seo and Lee Han-bin are members of Fantasy Boys.)	23	S	6	10	10	1,137,447	498,574	1,636,021	12	15	848,073	422,141	1,240,214	Not Shown	22	528,618	177,923	706,541	Eliminated								22
MyPlan Entertainment	Kang Wang-seok (강왕석) (Note: Kang Wang-seok is a member of Plan B.)	23	B	55	57	65	121,409	54,109	175,518	57	51	176,143	76,658	292,801	Eliminated													51
Individual Trainees (개인 연습생)	Kim Dan-u (김단우)	19	A	93	77	77	93,295	38,017	151,312	Eliminated																		77
Individual Trainees (개인 연습생)	Kim Do-hun (김도훈)	20	S	91	29	30	155,387	300,100	455,487	40	50	161,495	197,158	293,653	Eliminated													50
Individual Trainees (개인 연습생)	Kim Eun-ho (김은호)	17	C	94	66	76	130,623	21,744	152,367	Eliminated																		76
Individual Trainees (개인 연습생)	Kim Hyun-jae (김현재) (Note: Kim Hyun-jae was a member of BLACK6IX.)	24	B	64	26	27	285,278	253,911	539,189	31	44	187,207	207,113	350,320	Eliminated													44
PocketDol Studio (포켓돌스튜디오)	Kim Hyun-woo (김현우)	23	A	10	15	16	619,454	529,463	1,148,917	15	13	667,544	563,295	1,290,839	Not Shown	21	449,978	289,336	739,314	Not Shown	223,496	167,334	25,726	31,870	745,926	1,005,216	2,199,568	11
Hi-Hat Entertainment (하이헷 주식회사)	Kim Jeong-min (김정민)	17	S	51	39	34	253,656	132,578	386,234	25	25	399,649	194,999	634,648	23	18	511,109	217,089	778,198	Not Shown	75,874	100,817	38,974	29,692	740,444	790,098	1,775,899	13
Individual Trainees (개인 연습생)	Kim Jeong-yun (김정윤)	16	C	78	92	93	106,697	12,957	119,654	Eliminated																		93
Individual Trainees (개인 연습생)	Kim Ji-hwan (김지환)	17	B	70	94	95	97,012	19,937	116,949	Eliminated																		95
Biscuit Entertainment (비스킷엔터테인먼트)	Kim Ji-min (김지민) (Note: Kim Ji-min and Yang Ju-ho are members of HAWW.)	22	B	62	61	64	110,205	66,185	176,390	56	56	180,902	127,549	258,450	Eliminated													56
Individual Trainees (개인 연습생)	Kim Joo-hyun (김주현)	18	A	17	24	26	395,535	146,547	542,082	30	29	362,918	121,057	473,975	Not Shown	25	439,047	74,755	513,802	Eliminated								25
Individual Trainees (개인 연습생)	Kim Joon-woo (김준우)	22	B	63	85	61	147,168	43,108	190,276	28	30	355,334	125,395	470,729	Not Shown	32	287,536	89,246	376,782	Eliminated								32
Individual Trainees (개인 연습생)	Kim Min-jun (김민준)	19	B	99	72	79	136,539	14,421	150,960	Eliminated																		79
Individual Trainees (개인 연습생)	Kim Si-hun (김시훈) (Note: Kim Si-hun is a member of BDC.)	25	A	3	3	4	1,443,091	1,078,012	2,521,103	9	9	874,098	758,673	1,612,771	Not Shown	8	1,041,954	774,383	1,816,337	Not Shown	467,193	581,346	179,982	200,184	742,416	939,954	3,111,075	8
Individual Trainees (개인 연습생)	Kim Si-yul (김시율)	16	B	74	74	84	115,807	21,179	136,986	Eliminated																		84
Individual Trainees (개인 연습생)	Kim Sung-jun (김성준)	18	A	48	73	81	110,624	36,390	147,014	Eliminated																		81
M Directors	Kim Sung-min (김성민)	18	S	4	5	3	1,647,115	917,289	2,564,404	5	6	1,279,821	684,056	2,013,677	9	4	1,180,150	776,284	2,152,473	7	399,356	618,575	210,854	227,994	1,234,072	915,802	3,656,653 (Note: Kim Sung-min received an additional 50,000 points due to Director Benefit.)	7
K-Tigers E&C (K타이거즈 E&C)	Kim Tae-sung (김태성)	20	C	87	98	78	108,111	42,919	151,030	Eliminated																		78
J-Star Entertainment (제이스타 엔터테인먼트)	Kim Tae-yu (김태유)	24	S	54	58	53	119,263	97,258	236,521	33	36	238,079	205,764	423,844	Eliminated													36
KPLUS (케이플러스)	Kim Yoon-sue (김윤수)	24	C	96	76	83	117,063	22,056	139,119	Eliminated																		83
Individual Trainees (개인 연습생)	Kim Young-hoon (김영훈) (Note: Kim Young-hoon was a member of Seven O'Clock and Black Level.)	27	B	39	47	45	77,113	202,977	280,090	55	53	187,445	86,866	284,310	Eliminated													53
Individual Trainees (개인 연습생)	Ko Min-sung (고민성)	17	A	77	83	82	125,754	17,317	143,071	Eliminated																		82
KPLUS	Kwon Yang-woo (권양우)	19	A	44	33	32	249,572	159,305	408,877	48	52	187,816	127,227	285,043	Eliminated													52
Nature Space (자연 공간)	Kwon Ye-ung (권예웅)	27	B	71	88	70	104,237	40,885	165,122	47	47	192,129	88,793	310,922	Eliminated													47
Individual Trainees (개인 연습생)	Kwon Yong-hyun (권용현) (Note: Kwon Yong-hyun was a member of TST and Xeed.)	27	B	13	18	20	643,956	304,094	948,050	23	23	497,721	225,122	792,843	Not Shown	29	305,147	160,218	465,365	Eliminated								29
Individual Trainees (개인 연습생)	Lee Do-kyeong (이도경)	30	C	67	86	96	90,939	23,361	114,300	Eliminated																		96
Individual Trainees (개인 연습생)	Lee Eun-suh (이은서)	25	B	57	64	63	130,048	32,315	182,363	62	64	155,770	87,910	213,680	Eliminated													64
ON1 Entertainment (온원 엔터테인먼트)	Lee Gun-woo (이건우)	19	B	43	60	47	199,888	47,021	266,909	32	32	347,750	129,172	456,922	Not Shown	27	354,031	131,304	485,335	Eliminated								27
PocketDol Studio (포켓돌스튜디오)	Lee Han-bin (이한빈)	22	A	20	30	29	300,670	174,543	475,213	24	24	433,182	259,466	722,648	22	23	425,991	270,444	696,435	Eliminated								23
Individual Trainees (개인 연습생)	Lee Hyo-bin (이효빈)	22	C	69	90	98	70,678	34,298	104,976	Eliminated																		98
Individual Trainees (개인 연습생)	Lee Ji-hoon (이지훈)	24	C	40	52	66	119,053	56,201	175,254	61	43	219,714	67,656	357,370	Eliminated													43
Individual Trainees (개인 연습생)	Lee Ju-chan (이주찬)	22	B	92	95	89	113,032	16,485	129,517	Eliminated																		89
Individual Trainees (개인 연습생)	Lee Jun-seon (이준선)	15	A	84	49	Left the show																						99
COMMAND THE-M Entertainment	Lee No-yul (이노율)	20	B	82	78	86	93,452	39,783	133,235	Eliminated																		86
Future Idol (퓨처아이돌)	Lee Yu-jun (이유준)	17	C	65	70	71	116,593	43,126	159,918	Eliminated																		71
Individual Trainees (개인 연습생)	Lim Hyun-woo (임현우)	13	B	79	97	97	80,782	25,164	105,946	Eliminated																		97
Individual Trainees (개인 연습생)	Lin Weichen (린웨이천)	17	C	89	89	74	99,630	35,243	154,873	Eliminated																		74
Individual Trainees (개인 연습생)	Lynn Lynn (린린)	20	A	38	51	48	127,116	114,502	261,618	46	35	198,002	195,239	433,241	Not Shown	16	479,633	311,290	790,923	Not Shown	39,544	95,534	11,384	33,796	512,158	795,446	1,487,862	20
Individual Trainees (개인 연습생)	Ma Jingxiang (马靖翔) / (마징시앙)	20	A	5	4	5	1,661,670	819,854	2,481,524	8	7	1,225,342	517,713	1,733,055	Not Shown	5	1,450,842	634,736	2,135,578	Not Shown	2,991,238	644,874	364,016	177,876	1,168,832	632,692	6,004,528 (Note: Ma Jingxiang received an additional 25,000 points due to Director Benefit.)	1
DNA Entertainment (디엔에이엔터테인먼트)	Manabe Jin (真鍋仁) / (마나베 진)	23	S	83	93	88	99,315	30,540	129,855	Eliminated																		88
Individual Trainees (개인 연습생)	Nam Ji-woon (남지운)	22	A	11	13	12	1,158,074	439,722	1,597,796	7	8	1,256,794	409,318	1,726,112	8	9	1,131,322	328,294	1,605,578	Not Shown	677,454	250,792	231,108	90,936	1,072,782	611,058	2,934,130	9
Individual Trainees (개인 연습생)	Obayashi Yusei (오바야시 유우세)	23	B	95	63	59	112,247	62,828	195,075	65	60	122,609	98,997	241,605	Eliminated													60
Individual Trainees (개인 연습생)	Oh Seung-chan (오승찬)	21	B	32	37	37	311,612	54,226	365,838	42	41	337,861	42,041	379,903	Eliminated													41
Individual Trainees (개인 연습생)	Oh Tae-hwan (오태환)	20	A	35	41	39	287,948	55,685	343,633	34	27	410,281	109,209	509,490	Not Shown	30	351,501	88,557	440,058	Eliminated								30
Individual Trainees (개인 연습생)	Oh Young-woong (오영웅)	20	B	86	81	54	189,522	33,517	223,039	64	70	162,685	74,026	166,711	Eliminated													70
Individual Trainees (개인 연습생)	Ok Chang-hyeon (옥창현)	21	A	52	46	42	268,105	25,783	293,888	69	61	223,357	61,934	225,291	Eliminated													61
Individual Trainees (개인 연습생)	Park Chan-yong (박찬용)	20	C	58	67	67	122,614	31,172	173,786	67	69	172,425	76,026	178,435	Eliminated													69
PocketDol Studio (포켓돌스튜디오)	Park Jun-seo (박준서) (Note: Park Jun-seo and Yu Ji-ahn were contestant on Boys24.)	22	S	21	21	18	571,446	361,397	1,052,843	16	17	611,704	509,155	1,110,859	Not Shown	20	409,191	348,312	757,503	Not Shown	28,935	102,951	14,998	27,920	489,682	611,488	1,300,974 (Note: Park Jun-seo received an additional 25,000 points due to Director Benefit.)	21
Individual Trainees (개인 연습생)	Park Jun-woo (박준우)	13	A	24	36	38	271,142	64,834	355,976	51	42	253,099	76,614	359,713	Eliminated													42
Individual Trainees (개인 연습생)	Petch (เพชร) / (펫) (Note: Petch was a contestant on 9low On Top.)	23	B	41	44	46	141,147	107,468	268,615	68	63	152,647	119,216	216,864	Eliminated													63
Individual Trainees (개인 연습생)	Sakurada Kenshin (桜田健信) / (사쿠라다 켄신)	16	S	2	2	2	2,154,793	1,988,001	4,162,794	1	2	1,899,207	1,424,329	3,393,536	Not Shown	1	1,685,345	1,525,283	3,531,691	4	411,466	1,108,546	171,990	358,186	1,504,680	1,552,930	5,107,798	2
KONGTHUP	Santa (แซนต้า) / (산타)	18	A	33	31	33	179,208	203,647	402,855	52	66	152,796	113,338	206,134	Eliminated													66
Individual Trainees (개인 연습생)	Seo Jin-won (서진원)	15	S	56	38	40	226,484	105,123	331,607	37	39	246,630	127,440	394,070	Eliminated													39
Individual Trainees (개인 연습생)	Seo Kyoung-bae (서경배)	16	A	19	7	7	1,183,885	1,013,381	2,197,266	3	3	1,343,267	1,193,437	2,596,704	Not Shown	2	1,334,653	1,558,976	3,182,992	Not Shown	511,185	771,974	194,980	287,488	1,256,112	1,263,734	4,285,473	4
Individual Trainees (개인 연습생)	Shin Jae-won (신재원) (Note: Shin Jae-won was a member of The Wind.)	20	A	31	25	25	337,160	226,918	564,078	26	26	325,072	194,051	529,123	Not Shown	34	180,153	138,596	318,749	Eliminated								34
SHORTT	Song Hyung-seok (송형석)	18	B	25	40	44	218,945	65,335	284,280	58	54	176,292	71,663	267,955	Eliminated													54
Hi-Hat Entertainment (하이헷 주식회사)	Song Seung-ho (송승호)	17	A	9	14	14	999,650	557,468	1,557,118	6	5	1,241,031	753,478	2,044,509	Not Shown	6	1,069,382	725,280	2,024,128	9	551,908	557,198	258,478	215,998	1,434,946	1,060,004	4,128,532 (Note: Song Seung-ho received an additional 50,000 points due to Director Benefit.)	5
Individual Trainees (개인 연습생)	Sviat (스비아트)	13	C	22	28	28	278,000	209,773	487,773	39	59	190,047	126,861	246,908	Eliminated													59
Individual Trainees (개인 연습생)	Tsujii Ryoma (츠지이 료마)	18	A	61	82	85	86,855	47,030	133,885	Eliminated																		85
Individual Trainees (개인 연습생)	Woo Ha-joon (우하준)	22	B	23	27	24	508,150	103,009	611,159	21	20	792,978	167,304	940,282	10	10	1,034,161	153,593	1,237,754	Not Shown	185,773	235,478	150,970	33,542	739,786	367,078	1,712,627	14
DNA Entertainment (디엔에이엔터테인먼트)	Wu Chenyu (吳宸宇) / (우첸유)	22	A	68	75	51	151,146	72,853	243,999	44	34	190,716	194,547	445,263	Not Shown	31	217,803	221,494	439,297	Eliminated								31
Individual Trainee (개인 연습생)	Yamaguchi Satoshi (山口悟史) / (야마구치 사토시)	21	B	80	91	94	80,834	36,409	117,243	Eliminated																		94
Biscuit Entertainment (비스킷엔터테인먼트)	Yang Ju-ho (양주호)	20	B	97	69	73	130,309	25,263	155,572	Eliminated																		73
ChoCo Entertainment (초코엔터테인먼트)	Yeom Ye-chan (염예찬)	16	A	50	55	49	151,356	104,170	255,526	36	45	210,717	165,799	336,517	Eliminated													45
Individual Trainee (개인 연습생)	Yi Chen (亦辰) / (이첸) (Note: Yi Chen was a contestant on Youth With You.)	26	S	16	8	11	938,187	669,047	1,607,234	14	12	737,213	541,709	1,328,922	Not Shown	13	497,446	397,458	894,904	Not Shown	365,009	103,514	72,254	89,208	572,464	606,856	1,809,305	12
Futore Company	Yoo Hee-do (유희도) (Note: Yoo Hee-do was a member of B.I.G.) (Note: Yoo Hee-do was a contestant on The Unit: Idol Rebooting Project.)	28	C	30	32	31	308,994	116,454	445,448	43	46	226,480	127,383	313,863	Eliminated													46
TNK Entertainment (TNK 엔터테인먼트)	Yoo Hyeon-seung (유현승)	20	B	76	71	72	100,258	57,660	157,572	Eliminated																		72
PocketDol Studio (포켓돌스튜디오)	Yoo Young-seo (유영서)	22	A	18	23	20	536,263	260,263	917,091	17	16	719,070	443,575	1,232,645	Not Shown	14	549,771	339,915	889,686	Not Shown	92,002	118,227	46,090	36,328	613,910	671,194	1,577,751	17
Individual Trainee (개인 연습생)	Yoon Ju-han (윤주한)	16	C	98	84	91	93,871	27,156	121,027	Eliminated																		91
First Entertainment	Yu Ji-ahn (유지안) (Note: Yu Ji-ahn is a member of Skye.)	32	A	28	34	35	196,485	159,120	375,605	38	33	243,432	152,041	455,473	Not Shown	33	233,490	132,839	366,329	Eliminated								33
Individual Trainee (개인 연습생)	Zhang Jinglong (张景龙) / (장경용)	24	B	85	96	75	86,018	47,246	153,264	Eliminated																		75

=== Prior to Project 7 ===
Prior to Project 7

== Zero Setting Test (Episode 1) ==
Out of the 200 starting trainees, 100 are to be picked to move onto the next round. Trainees can either be passed, deferred, or eliminated. Passed trainees are immediately able to move onto the next round, deferred trainees have to wait to be chosen following the Zero Setting Test performances, and the eliminated trainees are not able to move onto the next round at all. After the Zero Setting Test Performances, 70 trainees were passed, 68 were deferred, and 62 were eliminated. Out of the 68 deferred trainees, 30 trainees were selected to move onto the next round. Based on how well the trainees demonstrated comprehensive performance ability, potential, and the possibility of strengthening after assembly, the qualified candidates will be assigned a preliminary grade and matching outfits relative to the given grade; S - Yellow, A - Blue, B - Pink, C - Gray.

PROJECT 1: Zero Setting
Booth 1 (Moonbyul, Bada, Hwesung)			Booth 2 (Hui, Ryan, Yoomi)			Booth 3 (Miyeon, Sungwoon, Ryu D)			Booth 4 (Daehwi, Haein, Woohyun)		
Original artist(s)	Song	Contestant(s)	Original artist(s)	Song	Contestant(s)	Original artist(s)	Song	Contestant(s)	Original artist(s)	Song	Contestant(s)
The Boyz	Maverick	Ma Jingxiang	NCT U	Make A Wish	Lynn Lynn	Nowadays	OoWee	Lim Hyunwoo	Wanna One	Burn It Up	Seo Jinwon
NCT 127	Kick It	Tsujii Ryoma	NCT Dream	Beatbox	Yichen	GOT7	If You Do	Aom	Slate	Oh Little Girl	Song Hyungseok
NCT Dream	We Young	Park Junwoo	Enhypen	Fever	Woo Hajoon	Shinee	Replay	Sviat	Stray Kids	Maniac	Jang Yeojun
Ateez	The Real - Heung Version	Manabe Jin, Wu Chenyu	Taeyong	Tap	Jang Injae	BoyNextDoor	But Sometimes	Hou Guanyi	Taemin	Criminal	Binghua
Stray Kids	Chk Chk Boom	Seo Kyoungbae	NCT U	90's Love	Shin Jaewon	NCT U	Boss	Nam Jiwoon	Infinite	Man In Love	Lee Dokyeong
Baekhyun	Bambi	Lee Juchan	Taeyong	Shalala	Yeom Yechan	TXT	Crown	Fong Atilla	HOT	Candy	Yoon Juhan
Baekhyun	Candy	Oh Seungchan	B.I	Waterfall	Kim Hyunjae	TXT	9 and Three Quarters	Lee Jihoon	B1A4	What's Happening?	Jung Seungwon
EXO	Ko Ko Bop	Yoo Heedo	Jungkook	Seven	Lin Wei Chen	2PM	10 Out Of 10	Lee Gunwoo	GOT7	Girls Girls Girls	Santa, Petch
Taeyong	Tap	Andy	Shinhwa	Eusha! Eusha!	Lee Junseon	Monsta X	Trespass	Obayashi Yusei	Taeyang	Vibe	Ayalon Adam
B.I	Waterfall	Kim Taeyu	TXT	Crown	Baek Jiho	Key	Bad Love	Oh Youngwoong	Wanna One	Beautiful	Lee Hyobin
New Jeans	Hype Boy	Kim Sungmin	EXO	Love Me Right	Park Chanyong, Lee Yujun, Im Siu	Rain	Instead Of Saying Goodbye	Choi Juyoung	Infinite	Be Mine	Lee Noyul, Chae Heeju, Choi Byunghoon
BoyNextDoor	But Sometimes	Kim Jeongyun	SuperM	Jopping	Kim Hyunwoo, Park Junseo, Yoo Youngseo, Jeon Minwook	TXT	Deja Vu	Ha Seokhee	Jung Kook	Euphoria	Kang Heemin
Jung Kook	Euphoria	Kwon Yangwoo	Enhypen	Blessed-Cursed	Kim Younghoon	BoyNextDoor	One and Only	Jeong Deunhaeseol	Kai	Rover	Kim Jihwan
Crush	Hmm-Cheat	Kim Jeongmin, Song Seungho, Jung Seyun	BTS	Save Me	Kang Minseo, Lee Hanbin	HOT	Candy	Sakurada Kenshin, Fukuyama Sota	Shinee	Replay	Kim Siyul
Unknown Booth			NCT U	Baggy Jeans	Kang Jimin, Ko Minsung	NCT Dream	Beatbox	Yu Jiahn	New Jeans	Supernatural	Kim Sihun
BTS	DNA	Abe Yura, Asaka Kotaro, Yoo Hyeonseung	New Jeans	Supernatural	Kim Jimin, Yang Juho	2PM	My House	Ahn Junwon	NCT U	Baby Don't Stop	Kang Wangseok, Yamaguchi Satoshi
NCT Dream	Smoothie	Zhang Jinglong	Ateez	Wonderland	Kang Hyunwoo	EXO	Love Me Right	Kim Sungjun, Oh Taehwan, Jang Hyeonseok	Shinhwa	Perfect Man	Kwon Yonghyun
N/A	N/A	Jung Johan				EXO	Mama	Kim Dohun	Enhypen	Bite Me	Kim Eunho, Kim Joonwoo
						TXT	Crown	Kim Joohyun, Ok Changhyeon, Lee Eunsuh			
						Wanna One	Energetic	Kim Yoonsue			
						Taeyong	Tap	Kim Danu			
						NCT Dream	Smoothie	Kwon Yeung, Cho Hyojin			
						IVE	I Am	Kim Taesung			
						NCT U	Baggy Jeans	Kim Minjun			

== Signal Song Test (Episode 2-3) ==
In this mission, trainees are to divide themselves up into 5 groups of 20, which become their units for this mission. The trainees are to prepare the vocals and the choreography of the signal song of the show, 'Run (Up To You)'. After preparations, trainees are to film a video of themselves performing individually, and all the videos will be shown to the judges. Each trainee gets scored individually. Following all the trainees video scoring, all the scores for each unit are added together to determine the interim unit rankings. After the interim rankings, the directors reveal that there will be a team evaluation which will determine the final unit rankings. The unit rank determines where the members of each unit stand on the pyramid stage where they will perform and film the official video for the signal song. The highest ranking unit stand in the Tier 1 Zone, down to Tier 4 Zone onstage. The lowest ranking unit stands in the Shadow Zone, which situates on the floor underneath the Tier 4 Zone in the pyramid. The trainees in the Shadow Zone wouldn't have any singing parts, they would just have backup vocals and serve as support to the rest of the trainees. As a benefit for receiving the highest rank, one member from the unit with the highest rank will have the chance to become the center of the performance, getting to stand at the highest point of the pyramid, in the very center of everyone.

Color key

Leader
Winning Team
Center

PROJECT 2: Signal Song Test
Unit	Contestant	Individual Score	Contestant	Individual Score	Individual Score Sum	Interim Tier	Team Evaluation Score	Score	Tier
P1	Andy	Undisclosed	Kim Hyunwoo	6	208	3rd Tier	465	673	2nd Tier
P1	Cho Hyojin	Undisclosed	Kim Jeongmin	Undisclosed	208	3rd Tier	465	673	2nd Tier
P1	Jang Hyeonseok	9	Kwon Yonghyun	16	208	3rd Tier	465	673	2nd Tier
P1	Jang Injae	5	Lee Hanbin	5	208	3rd Tier	465	673	2nd Tier
P1	Jang Yeojun	9	Oh Taehwan	14	208	3rd Tier	465	673	2nd Tier
P1	Jeon Minwook	4	Park Junseo	17	208	3rd Tier	465	673	2nd Tier
P1	Jeong Deunhaesol	13	Park Junwoo	7	208	3rd Tier	465	673	2nd Tier
P1	Kang Hyunwoo	9	Woo Hajoon	6	208	3rd Tier	465	673	2nd Tier
P1	Kang Minseo	Undisclosed	Yoo Youngseo	18	208	3rd Tier	465	673	2nd Tier
P1	Kim Dohun	Undisclosed	Yu Jiahn	12	208	3rd Tier	465	673	2nd Tier
P2	Baek Jiho	7	Kim Taeyu	8	198	4th Tier	391	589	Shadow Zone
P2	Chae Heeju	17	Kim Younghoon	13	198	4th Tier	391	589	Shadow Zone
P2	Im Siu	11	Lee Dokyeong	7	198	4th Tier	391	589	Shadow Zone
P2	Jung Johan	4	Lee Hyobin	9	198	4th Tier	391	589	Shadow Zone
P2	Jung Seungwon	4	Lee Juchan	14	198	4th Tier	391	589	Shadow Zone
P2	Kim Danu	15	Lee Junseon	7	198	4th Tier	391	589	Shadow Zone
P2	Kim Eunho	4	Song Hyungseok	10	198	4th Tier	391	589	Shadow Zone
P2	Kim Hyunjae	11	Yamaguchi Satoshi	8	198	4th Tier	391	589	Shadow Zone
P2	Kim Joonwoo	18	Yoo Heedo	15	198	4th Tier	391	589	Shadow Zone
P2	Kim Sihun	12	Yoon Juhan	4	198	4th Tier	391	589	Shadow Zone
P3	Ahn Junwon	12	Lee Gunwoo	5	190	Shadow Zone	420	610	4th Tier
P3	Asaka Kotaro	11	Lee Noyul	15	190	Shadow Zone	420	610	4th Tier
P3	Choi Byunghoon	5	Lim Hyunwoo	9	190	Shadow Zone	420	610	4th Tier
P3	Fukuyama Sota	4	Manabe Jin	14	190	Shadow Zone	420	610	4th Tier
P3	Ha Seokhee	10	Nam Jiwoon	7	190	Shadow Zone	420	610	4th Tier
P3	Kang Heemin	7	Obayashi Yusei	9	190	Shadow Zone	420	610	4th Tier
P3	Kang Wangseok	11	Oh Seungchan	4	190	Shadow Zone	420	610	4th Tier
P3	Kim Jimin	18	Seo Kyoungbae	10	190	Shadow Zone	420	610	4th Tier
P3	Kim Minjun	12	Yang Juho	11	190	Shadow Zone	420	610	4th Tier
P3	Kwon Yeung	8	Yoo Hyeonseung	8	190	Shadow Zone	420	610	4th Tier
P4	Abe Yura	18	Kim Yoonsue	6	230	1st Tier	482	712	1st Tier
P4	Binghua	13	Ko Minsung	12	230	1st Tier	482	712	1st Tier
P4	Choi Juyoung	8	Lee Yujun	16	230	1st Tier	482	712	1st Tier
P4	Hou Guanyi	4	Ok Changhyeon	12	230	1st Tier	482	712	1st Tier
P4	Kim Jeongyun	6	Park Chanyong	16	230	1st Tier	482	712	1st Tier
P4	Kim Jihwan	7	Sakurada Kenshin	Undisclosed	230	1st Tier	482	712	1st Tier
P4	Kim Joohyun	12	Seo Jinwon	Undisclosed	230	1st Tier	482	712	1st Tier
P4	Kim Siyul	8	Shin Jaewon	14	230	1st Tier	482	712	1st Tier
P4	Kim Sungmin	Undisclosed	Yeom Yechan	15	230	1st Tier	482	712	1st Tier
P4	Kim Taesung	16	Zhang Jinglong	16	230	1st Tier	482	712	1st Tier
P5	Aom	8	Lynn Lynn	4	223	2nd Tier	398	621	3rd Tier
P5	Ayalon Adam	11	Ma Jingxiang	8	223	2nd Tier	398	621	3rd Tier
P5	Fong Atilla	Undisclosed	Oh Youngwoong	11	223	2nd Tier	398	621	3rd Tier
P5	Jung Seyun	16	Petch	17	223	2nd Tier	398	621	3rd Tier
P5	Kang Jimin	Undisclosed	Santa	8	223	2nd Tier	398	621	3rd Tier
P5	Kim Sungjun	9	Song Seungho	5	223	2nd Tier	398	621	3rd Tier
P5	Kwon Yangwoo	16	Sviat	18	223	2nd Tier	398	621	3rd Tier
P5	Lee Eunsuh	13	Tsujii Ryoma	13	223	2nd Tier	398	621	3rd Tier
P5	Lee Jihoon	4	Wu Chenyu	16	223	2nd Tier	398	621	3rd Tier
P5	Lin Weichen	10	Yichen	10	223	2nd Tier	398	621	3rd Tier

== Position Match (Episode 3–4) ==
In this mission, trainees are to divide themselves up into units of varying numbers. The trainees are presented with three positions with four songs each. Vocal has 'Love me or Leave Me' by Day6, 'Don't Go' by Exo, 'We Must Love' by ONF, & 'Love Wins All' by IU. Dance gets 'Kiwi' by Harry Styles, 'Closer' by The Chainsmokers, 'Pop' by NSYNC, & '3D' by Jungkook. Rap receives 'Shalala' by Taeyong, 'Crayon' by G-Dragon, 'Work' by Ateez, & Mommae by Jay Park. Each position also comes with their own specific challenge; Vocal teams must participate in the arrangement of the song, Dance teams must rechoreograph a certain section of their song, and Rap teams must write their own rap for a certain section of their song. The order in which the trainees head up to the area of choice is in of position revealed, trainees who wish to be vocalists go to Vocal, etc. for Dance, and then Rap, but this order is insignificant, as anyone can get dropped from anywhere immediately after. Speaking of, after the initial selection, any team with any amount of overflow members has to kick out as many overflows as necessary. Once the units are narrowed down to the appropriate number, the kicked out trainees would have to reorganize themselves into the remaining units that had leftover spots. The parts for this mission are decided by the trainees themselves, mainly for the Center position. Each trainee in a unit is to vote for another member of their unit to be the center and the recipient of the most votes would assume the role in most cases. Following the performances, the 500 World Assemblers present at the live show, as well as the five Directors would vote for the best performance out of each category, and the members of the recipient unit of the most votes would receive 20 000 points each to be added to their voting score. The 500 World Assemblers would also participate in a vote for the MVP of each position, voting for the contestant they think did the best per unit. The single contestant who received the most votes amongst everyone in the same position would receive 100 000 points to be added to their voting score.

Color key

Leader
Winning Team
Position MVP
Contestant unable to perform

PROJECT 3: Position Match
Performance			Team		Contestants					
#	Song	Original artist(s)	Name	Points	Position	Name			Rank	
Vocal
5	"Love me or Leave me"	Day6	럽미5와 줄리엣 (Love Me 5 and Juliet)	135	Center	Lee Hanbin			3	
5	"Love me or Leave me"	Day6	럽미5와 줄리엣 (Love Me 5 and Juliet)	135	Main Vocal	Kang Hyunwoo			4	
5	"Love me or Leave me"	Day6	럽미5와 줄리엣 (Love Me 5 and Juliet)	135	Sub Vocal 1	Kim Sihun			1	
5	"Love me or Leave me"	Day6	럽미5와 줄리엣 (Love Me 5 and Juliet)	135	Sub Vocal 2	Oh Youngwoong			5	
5	"Love me or Leave me"	Day6	럽미5와 줄리엣 (Love Me 5 and Juliet)	135	Sub Vocal 3	Oh Taehwan			2	
9	"Don't Go" (나비소녀)	Exo	꿀벌소년 (Honey Bee Boys)	132	Center	Nam Jiwoon			Undisclosed	
9	"Don't Go" (나비소녀)	Exo	꿀벌소년 (Honey Bee Boys)	132	Main Vocal	Kwon Yonghyun			2	
9	"Don't Go" (나비소녀)	Exo	꿀벌소년 (Honey Bee Boys)	132	Sub Vocal 1	Kim Sungmin			1	
9	"Don't Go" (나비소녀)	Exo	꿀벌소년 (Honey Bee Boys)	132	Sub Vocal 2	Baek Jiho			Undisclosed	
9	"Don't Go" (나비소녀)	Exo	꿀벌소년 (Honey Bee Boys)	132	Sub Vocal 3	Ahn Junwon			3	
9	"Don't Go" (나비소녀)	Exo	꿀벌소년 (Honey Bee Boys)	132	Sub Vocal 4	Jang Hyeonseok			Undisclosed	
10	"We Must Love" (사랑하게 될 거야)	ONF	요리조립 (Assemble Here and There)	47	Center	Lee Juchan			Undisclosed	
10	"We Must Love" (사랑하게 될 거야)	ONF	요리조립 (Assemble Here and There)	47	Main Vocal	Cho Hyojin			Undisclosed	
10	"We Must Love" (사랑하게 될 거야)	ONF	요리조립 (Assemble Here and There)	47	Sub Vocal 1	Kim Younghoon			Undisclosed	
10	"We Must Love" (사랑하게 될 거야)	ONF	요리조립 (Assemble Here and There)	47	Sub Vocal 2	Kim Jeongyun			Undisclosed	
10	"We Must Love" (사랑하게 될 거야)	ONF	요리조립 (Assemble Here and There)	47	Sub Vocal 3	Kim Joohyun			Undisclosed	
10	"We Must Love" (사랑하게 될 거야)	ONF	요리조립 (Assemble Here and There)	47	Sub Vocal 4	Lee Dokyeong			Undisclosed	
6	"Love Wins All"	IU	LOVE	163	Center	Binghua			4	
6	"Love Wins All"	IU	LOVE	163	Main Vocal	Wu Chenyu			3	
6	"Love Wins All"	IU	LOVE	163	Sub Vocal 1	Yoo Youngseo			1	
6	"Love Wins All"	IU	LOVE	163	Sub Vocal 2	Lee Eunsuh			5	
6	"Love Wins All"	IU	LOVE	163	Sub Vocal 3	Ha Seokhee			2	
Dance
Performance			Team		Contestants					
#	Song	Original artist(s)	Name	Points	Position	Name	Rank	Position	Name	Rank
11	"Kiwi"	Harry Styles	WE-KEY	46	Center; Main Dancer	Kim Joonwoo	1	Sub Dancer	Lim Hyunwoo	Undisclosed
11	"Kiwi"	Harry Styles	WE-KEY	46	Sub Dancer	Ayalon Adam	Undisclosed	Sub Dancer	Song Hyungseok	Undisclosed
11	"Kiwi"	Harry Styles	WE-KEY	46	Sub Dancer	Hou Guanyi	Undisclosed	Sub Dancer	Sviat	Undisclosed
11	"Kiwi"	Harry Styles	WE-KEY	46	Sub Dancer	Jang Injae	Undisclosed	Sub Dancer	Woo Hajoon	Undisclosed
11	"Kiwi"	Harry Styles	WE-KEY	46	Sub Dancer	Jung Seugwon	Undisclosed	Sub Dancer	Yamaguchi Satoshi	Undisclosed
11	"Kiwi"	Harry Styles	WE-KEY	46	Sub Dancer	Kim Yoonsue	Undisclosed	Sub Dancer	Yoon Juhan	Undisclosed
11	"Kiwi"	Harry Styles	WE-KEY	46	Sub Dancer	Kwon Yangwoo	Undisclosed	Sub Dancer	Kim Hyunwoo	N/A (Note: Kim Hyunwoo was unable to perform due to injury, but was still confirmed to be part of this team)
11	"Kiwi"	Harry Styles	WE-KEY	46	Sub Dancer	Lee Yujun	Undisclosed			
7	"Closer"	The Chainsmokers	YOUR 네잎클로버 (your Four Leaf Clover)	117	Center	Kang Minseo	1	Sub Dancer	Kim Dohun	Undisclosed
7	"Closer"	The Chainsmokers	YOUR 네잎클로버 (your Four Leaf Clover)	117	Main Dancer	Yang Juho	7	Sub Dancer	Kim Eunho	Undisclosed
7	"Closer"	The Chainsmokers	YOUR 네잎클로버 (your Four Leaf Clover)	117	Sub Dancer	Aom	Undisclosed	Sub Dancer	Kim Jimin	6
7	"Closer"	The Chainsmokers	YOUR 네잎클로버 (your Four Leaf Clover)	117	Sub Dancer	Asaka Kotaro	4	Sub Dancer	Lee Hyobin	Undisclosed
7	"Closer"	The Chainsmokers	YOUR 네잎클로버 (your Four Leaf Clover)	117	Sub Dancer	Choi Byunghoon	Undisclosed	Sub Dancer	Lee Noyul	Undisclosed
7	"Closer"	The Chainsmokers	YOUR 네잎클로버 (your Four Leaf Clover)	117	Sub Dancer	Im Siu	Undisclosed	Sub Dancer	Oh Seungchan	3
7	"Closer"	The Chainsmokers	YOUR 네잎클로버 (your Four Leaf Clover)	117	Sub Dancer	Kang Wangseok	5	Sub Dancer	Seo Kyoungbae	2
8	"Pop"	NSYNC	POP SHY	72	Center; Main Dancer	Abe Yura	Undisclosed	Sub Dancer	Kim Sungjun	Undisclosed
8	"Pop"	NSYNC	POP SHY	72	Sub Dancer	Andy	Undisclosed	Sub Dancer	Ko Minsung	Undisclosed
8	"Pop"	NSYNC	POP SHY	72	Sub Dancer	Fong Atilla	Undisclosed	Sub Dancer	Ma Jingxiang	1
8	"Pop"	NSYNC	POP SHY	72	Sub Dancer	Fukuyama Sota	Undisclosed	Sub Dancer	Manabe Jin	Undisclosed
8	"Pop"	NSYNC	POP SHY	72	Sub Dancer	Kang Jimin	Undisclosed	Sub Dancer	Ok Changhyeon	Undisclosed
8	"Pop"	NSYNC	POP SHY	72	Sub Dancer	Kim Jihwan	Undisclosed	Sub Dancer	Seo Jinwon	Undisclosed
8	"Pop"	NSYNC	POP SHY	72	Sub Dancer	Kim Minjun	Undisclosed	Sub Dancer	Yoo Hyeonseung	Undisclosed
8	"Pop"	NSYNC	POP SHY	72	Sub Dancer	Kim Siyul	Undisclosed			
12	"3D"	Jungkook	T.T	233	Center; Main Dancer	Jang Yeojun	3	Sub Dancer	Park Junseo	1
12	"3D"	Jungkook	T.T	233	Sub Dancer	Chae Heeju	Undisclosed	Sub Dancer	Park Junwoo	Undisclosed
12	"3D"	Jungkook	T.T	233	Sub Dancer	Jeong Deunhaesol	Undisclosed	Sub Dancer	Petch	Undisclosed
12	"3D"	Jungkook	T.T	233	Sub Dancer	Kim Danu	Undisclosed	Sub Dancer	Sakurada Kenshin	2
12	"3D"	Jungkook	T.T	233	Sub Dancer	Lee Junseon	Undisclosed	Sub Dancer	Santa	Undisclosed
12	"3D"	Jungkook	T.T	233	Sub Dancer	Lin Weichen	Undisclosed	Sub Dancer	Yu Jiahn	4
12	"3D"	Jungkook	T.T	233	Sub Dancer	Lynn Lynn	Undisclosed	Sub Dancer	Zhang Jinglong	Undisclosed
12	"3D"	Jungkook	T.T	233	Sub Dancer	Park Chanyong	Undisclosed			
Rap
Performance			Team		Contestants					
#	Song	Original artist(s)	Name	Points	Position	Name			Rank	
3	"Shalala"	Taeyong	샤랄라라 랜드 (Shalala Land)	47	Center	Tsujii Ryoma			4	
3	"Shalala"	Taeyong	샤랄라라 랜드 (Shalala Land)	47	Main Rapper	Song Seungho			1	
3	"Shalala"	Taeyong	샤랄라라 랜드 (Shalala Land)	47	Sub Rapper 1	Shin Jaewon			2	
3	"Shalala"	Taeyong	샤랄라라 랜드 (Shalala Land)	47	Sub Rapper 2	Lee Jihoon			3	
1	"Crayon" (크레용)	G-Dragon	아 그래용? (Oh, Really?)	192	Center	Lee Gunwoo			3	
1	"Crayon" (크레용)	G-Dragon	아 그래용? (Oh, Really?)	192	Main Rapper	Kim Taeyu			1	
1	"Crayon" (크레용)	G-Dragon	아 그래용? (Oh, Really?)	192	Sub Rapper 1	Kwon Yeung			4	
1	"Crayon" (크레용)	G-Dragon	아 그래용? (Oh, Really?)	192	Sub Rapper 2	Obayashi Yusei			5	
1	"Crayon" (크레용)	G-Dragon	아 그래용? (Oh, Really?)	192	Sub Rapper 3	Yoo Heedo			1	
4	"Work"	Ateez	work쟁이들 (work hustlers)	160	Center	Yeom Yechan			2	
4	"Work"	Ateez	work쟁이들 (work hustlers)	160	Main Rapper	Kim Jeongmin			Undisclosed	
4	"Work"	Ateez	work쟁이들 (work hustlers)	160	Sub Rapper 1	Kim Taesung			Undisclosed	
4	"Work"	Ateez	work쟁이들 (work hustlers)	160	Sub Rapper 2	Jeon Minwook			1	
4	"Work"	Ateez	work쟁이들 (work hustlers)	160	Sub Rapper 3	Choi Juyoung			Undisclosed	
2	"Mommae" (몸매)	Jay Park	맴매 (Mammae)	69	Center; Main Rapper	Yichen			1	
2	"Mommae" (몸매)	Jay Park	맴매 (Mammae)	69	Sub Rapper 1	Kang Heemin			4	
2	"Mommae" (몸매)	Jay Park	맴매 (Mammae)	69	Sub Rapper 2	Jung Seyun			2	
2	"Mommae" (몸매)	Jay Park	맴매 (Mammae)	69	Sub Rapper 3	Kim Hyunjae			3	

== Rival Match (Episode 6–7) ==
During the first assembly ceremony, surviving contestants were assembled into five teams, A1 through A5, based on the fans' assembly votes. The show initially hinted that each assembly would be a full team, but it is later revealed that each team will be divided in two, with each half competing against each other. The highest ranked contestant in each team (A1: Kwon Yonghyun, A2: Sakurada Kenshin, A3: Jeon Minwook, A4: Yichen, A5: Ok Changhyeon) picked his members to form their team (White Team), with the remaining members forming the other team (Black Team).

This mission had a unique benefit, never before seen on any survival show before. The winning team of each match will receive the steal benefit, allowing each member to steal points from the losing team's members. Based on the individual rank of the member in the audience vote, the members of the winning team will be able to steal from a range of 70,000 points (highest ranked member of the winning team will steal from the lowest ranked member of the losing team) to 10,000 points (lowest ranked member of the winning team will steal from the highest ranked member of the losing team).

Color key

Center
Leader
Leader and Center
Winning Team

PROJECT 4: Rival Match
Original Team	Performance			Black						Performance			White					
Original Team	Performance			Team		Contestants				Performance			Team		Contestants			
Original Team	#	Original artist(s)	Song	Name	Points	Rank	Points	Position	Name	#	Original artist(s)	Song	Name	Points	Rank	Points	Position	Name
A2	8	Monsta X	"Gambler"	잭팟 (Jackpot)	200	6	7	Main Vocal	Santa	7	Monsta X	"Jealousy"	그르렁 (Grumble)	324	7	7	Main Vocal	Shin Jaewon
A2	8	Monsta X	"Gambler"	잭팟 (Jackpot)	200	5	10	Sub Vocal 1	Fong Atilla	7	Monsta X	"Jealousy"	그르렁 (Grumble)	324	5	24	Sub Vocal 1	Lee Hanbin
A2	8	Monsta X	"Gambler"	잭팟 (Jackpot)	200	2	44	Sub Vocal 2	Woo Hajoon	7	Monsta X	"Jealousy"	그르렁 (Grumble)	324	4	29	Sub Vocal 2	Kim Jeongmin
A2	8	Monsta X	"Gambler"	잭팟 (Jackpot)	200	3	19	Sub Vocal 3	Oh Seungchan	7	Monsta X	"Jealousy"	그르렁 (Grumble)	324	3	57	Sub Vocal 3	Kim Sungmin
A2	8	Monsta X	"Gambler"	잭팟 (Jackpot)	200	7	4	Sub Vocal 4	Sviat	7	Monsta X	"Jealousy"	그르렁 (Grumble)	324	2	98	Sub Vocal 4	Kim Hyunwoo
A2	8	Monsta X	"Gambler"	잭팟 (Jackpot)	200	1	98	Rapper 1	Ma Jingxiang	7	Monsta X	"Jealousy"	그르렁 (Grumble)	324	6	9	Rapper 1	Seo Jinwon
A2	8	Monsta X	"Gambler"	잭팟 (Jackpot)	200	4	18	Rapper 2	Yeom Yechan	7	Monsta X	"Jealousy"	그르렁 (Grumble)	324	1	100	Rapper 2	Sakurada Kenshin
A4	1	NCT 127	"Touch"	마음s touch (hearts touch)	62	1	15	Main Vocal	Oh Taehwan	2	NCT U	"Make A Wish (Birthday Song)"	위시리스트 (Wishlist)	473	1	157	Main Vocal	Yoo Youngseo
A4	1	NCT 127	"Touch"	마음s touch (hearts touch)	62	3	12	Sub Vocal 1	Kwon Yangwoo	2	NCT U	"Make A Wish (Birthday Song)"	위시리스트 (Wishlist)	473	2	81	Sub Vocal 1	Nam Jiwoon
A4	1	NCT 127	"Touch"	마음s touch (hearts touch)	62	4	7	Sub Vocal 2	Hou Guanyi	2	NCT U	"Make A Wish (Birthday Song)"	위시리스트 (Wishlist)	473	4	66	Sub Vocal 2	Lynn Lynn
A4	1	NCT 127	"Touch"	마음s touch (hearts touch)	62	7	4	Sub Vocal 3	Jeong Deunhaesol	2	NCT U	"Make A Wish (Birthday Song)"	위시리스트 (Wishlist)	473	6	41	Sub Vocal 3	Ahn Junwon
A4	1	NCT 127	"Touch"	마음s touch (hearts touch)	62	5	5	Sub Vocal 4	Choi Juyoung	2	NCT U	"Make A Wish (Birthday Song)"	위시리스트 (Wishlist)	473	3	71	Main Rapper	Yichen
A4	1	NCT 127	"Touch"	마음s touch (hearts touch)	62	5	5	Sub Vocal 5	Petch	2	NCT U	"Make A Wish (Birthday Song)"	위시리스트 (Wishlist)	473	5	43	Sub Rapper 1	Andy
A4	1	NCT 127	"Touch"	마음s touch (hearts touch)	62	2	14	Rapper	Kim Taeyu	2	NCT U	"Make A Wish (Birthday Song)"	위시리스트 (Wishlist)	473	7	14	Sub Rapper 2	Fukuyama Sota
A3	10	Stray Kids	"Case 143"	Lover cops	176	2	40	Main Vocal	Kim Sihun	9	Stray Kids	"Lalalala"	와락	365	3	66	Main Rapper	Song Seungho
A3	10	Stray Kids	"Case 143"	Lover cops	176	3	33	Sub Vocal 1	Kang Minseo	9	Stray Kids	"Lalalala"	와락	365	4	63	Rapper 1	Jang Yeojun
A3	10	Stray Kids	"Case 143"	Lover cops	176	6	9	Sub Vocal 2	Jung Seyun	9	Stray Kids	"Lalalala"	와락	365	2	73	Rapper 2	Seo Kyoungbae
A3	10	Stray Kids	"Case 143"	Lover cops	176	5	18	Sub Vocal 3	Im Siu	9	Stray Kids	"Lalalala"	와락	365	1	101	Rapper 3	Jeon Minwook
A3	10	Stray Kids	"Case 143"	Lover cops	176	4	26	Rapper 1	Yoo Heedo	9	Stray Kids	"Lalalala"	와락	365	5	27	Sub Vocal 1	Binghua
A3	10	Stray Kids	"Case 143"	Lover cops	176	7	4	Rapper 2	Park Chanyong	9	Stray Kids	"Lalalala"	와락	365	6	23	Sub Vocal 2	Abe Yura
A3	10	Stray Kids	"Case 143"	Lover cops	176	1	46	Rapper 3	Park Junseo	9	Stray Kids	"Lalalala"	와락	365	7	12	Sub Vocal 3	Kang Hyunwoo
A5	6	TXT	"Deja Vu"	꼭 조립 Deja Vu~	300	2	64	Main Vocal	Wu Chenyu	5	TXT	"I'll See You; There Tomorrow"	조립해줘 기다릴게	253	2	61	Main Vocal	Cho Hyojin
A5	6	TXT	"Deja Vu"	꼭 조립 Deja Vu~	300	6	16	Lead Vocal	Obayashi Yusei	5	TXT	"I'll See You; There Tomorrow"	조립해줘 기다릴게	253	7	6	Lead Vocal	Oh Youngwoong
A5	6	TXT	"Deja Vu"	꼭 조립 Deja Vu~	300	1	100	Sub Vocal 1	Lee Jihoon	5	TXT	"I'll See You; There Tomorrow"	조립해줘 기다릴게	253	1	134	Sub Vocal 1	Kim Joonwoo
A5	6	TXT	"Deja Vu"	꼭 조립 Deja Vu~	300	5	25	Sub Vocal 2	Kwon Yeung	5	TXT	"I'll See You; There Tomorrow"	조립해줘 기다릴게	253	3	16	Sub Vocal 2	Lee Eunsuh
A5	6	TXT	"Deja Vu"	꼭 조립 Deja Vu~	300	4	37	Sub Vocal 3	Kang Wangseok	5	TXT	"I'll See You; There Tomorrow"	조립해줘 기다릴게	253	6	9	Sub Vocal 3	Ok Changhyeon
A5	6	TXT	"Deja Vu"	꼭 조립 Deja Vu~	300	3	46	Sub Vocal 4	Jung Seungwon	5	TXT	"I'll See You; There Tomorrow"	조립해줘 기다릴게	253	4	14	Sub Vocal 4	Kang Jimin
A5	6	TXT	"Deja Vu"	꼭 조립 Deja Vu~	300	7	12	Sub Vocal 5	Aom	5	TXT	"I'll See You; There Tomorrow"	조립해줘 기다릴게	253	5	13	Sub Vocal 5	Kim Jimin
A1	4	Riize	"Memories"	메모짱 (Memojjang)	251	6	4	Main Vocal	Kim Dohun	3	Riize	"Boom Boom Bass"	붐붐베이비 (Boom Boom Baby)	271	1	75	Main Vocal	Kwon Yonghyun
A1	4	Riize	"Memories"	메모짱 (Memojjang)	251	1	107	Lead Vocal	Kim Joohyun	3	Riize	"Boom Boom Bass"	붐붐베이비 (Boom Boom Baby)	271	2	65	Lead Vocal	Yu Jiahn
A1	4	Riize	"Memories"	메모짱 (Memojjang)	251	6	4	Sub Vocal 1	Baek Jiho	3	Riize	"Boom Boom Bass"	붐붐베이비 (Boom Boom Baby)	271	7	5	Sub Vocal 1	Kim Younghoon
A1	4	Riize	"Memories"	메모짱 (Memojjang)	251	3	40	Sub Vocal 2	Ha Seokhee	3	Riize	"Boom Boom Bass"	붐붐베이비 (Boom Boom Baby)	271	3	50	Sub Vocal 2	Chae Heeju
A1	4	Riize	"Memories"	메모짱 (Memojjang)	251	5	13	Sub Vocal 3	Ayalon Adam	3	Riize	"Boom Boom Bass"	붐붐베이비 (Boom Boom Baby)	271	5	27	Sub Vocal 3	Park Junwoo
A1	4	Riize	"Memories"	메모짱 (Memojjang)	251	4	15	Rapper 1	Kim Hyunjae	3	Riize	"Boom Boom Bass"	붐붐베이비 (Boom Boom Baby)	271	4	36	Sub Vocal 4	Asaka Kotaro
A1	4	Riize	"Memories"	메모짱 (Memojjang)	251	2	68	Rapper 2	Lee Gunwoo	3	Riize	"Boom Boom Bass"	붐붐베이비 (Boom Boom Baby)	271	6	13	Rapper	Song Hyungseok

== Originals Match (Episode 9–10) ==
During the second assembly ceremony, surviving contestants were assembled into five teams, A1 through A5, based on the fans' assembly votes. Each team would get an original song, options being Breaking News, Merry-Go-Round, Trigger, Kool-Aid, and Time After Time. By the end, A1 got Trigger, A2 got Merry-Go-Round, A3 got Kool-Aid, A4 got Time After Time, and A5 got Breaking News. The benefit for this mission is a little different compared to your usual benefit of a set number of vote points. Based on the live audience vote, the highest ranked contestant in each team will receive 50,000 points added to their total during the Third Assembly Ceremony. Alongside this, every member of the highest ranking team will receive 10% of their base vote points total re-added to their total. The first place contestant on the first place team will receive both benefits, 10% of their base points first, then the bonus 50,000 for getting first place in their team

Color key

Leader
Winning Team
First Place Contestant

PROJECT 5: Originals Match
Original Team	Performance				Team			Contestant		
Original Team	#	Concepts	Song	Production Credit (Note: Some contestants participated in the rap making and choreography production.)	Name	Rank	Points	Rank	Position	Name
A5	3	Neo & Urban	"Breaking News"	Lyrics & Composition: Ryan Jhun & Dwayne “Dem Jointz” Abernathy Jr.; Choreography: Bada Lee	속보 (Inside Scoop)	3	83	3	Main Rapper	Abe Yura
A5	3	Neo & Urban	"Breaking News"	Lyrics & Composition: Ryan Jhun & Dwayne “Dem Jointz” Abernathy Jr.; Choreography: Bada Lee	속보 (Inside Scoop)	3	83	1	Lead Rapper	Ahn Junwon
A5	3	Neo & Urban	"Breaking News"	Lyrics & Composition: Ryan Jhun & Dwayne “Dem Jointz” Abernathy Jr.; Choreography: Bada Lee	속보 (Inside Scoop)	3	83	2	Sub Rapper 1	Kang Minseo
A5	3	Neo & Urban	"Breaking News"	Lyrics & Composition: Ryan Jhun & Dwayne “Dem Jointz” Abernathy Jr.; Choreography: Bada Lee	속보 (Inside Scoop)	3	83	6	Sub Rapper 2	Yu Jiahn
A5	3	Neo & Urban	"Breaking News"	Lyrics & Composition: Ryan Jhun & Dwayne “Dem Jointz” Abernathy Jr.; Choreography: Bada Lee	속보 (Inside Scoop)	3	83	7	Vocal 1	Kang Hyunwoo
A5	3	Neo & Urban	"Breaking News"	Lyrics & Composition: Ryan Jhun & Dwayne “Dem Jointz” Abernathy Jr.; Choreography: Bada Lee	속보 (Inside Scoop)	3	83	4	Vocal 2	Kwon Yonghyun
A5	3	Neo & Urban	"Breaking News"	Lyrics & Composition: Ryan Jhun & Dwayne “Dem Jointz” Abernathy Jr.; Choreography: Bada Lee	속보 (Inside Scoop)	3	83	5	Vocal 3	Asaka Kotaro
A2	5	Fresh & Cool	"Merry-Go-Round"	Lyrics & Composition: Cho Wonsang & DINT; Choreography: Ryu D	부메랑 (Boomerang)	1	227	2	Main Vocal	Nam Jiwoon
A2	5	Fresh & Cool	"Merry-Go-Round"	Lyrics & Composition: Cho Wonsang & DINT; Choreography: Ryu D	부메랑 (Boomerang)	1	227	7	Lead Vocal 1	Andy
A2	5	Fresh & Cool	"Merry-Go-Round"	Lyrics & Composition: Cho Wonsang & DINT; Choreography: Ryu D	부메랑 (Boomerang)	1	227	5	Lead Vocal 2	Kim Sungmin
A2	5	Fresh & Cool	"Merry-Go-Round"	Lyrics & Composition: Cho Wonsang & DINT; Choreography: Ryu D	부메랑 (Boomerang)	1	227	4	Sub Vocal 1	Seo Kyoungbae
A2	5	Fresh & Cool	"Merry-Go-Round"	Lyrics & Composition: Cho Wonsang & DINT; Choreography: Ryu D	부메랑 (Boomerang)	1	227	6	Sub Vocal 2	Jung Seyun
A2	5	Fresh & Cool	"Merry-Go-Round"	Lyrics & Composition: Cho Wonsang & DINT; Choreography: Ryu D	부메랑 (Boomerang)	1	227	1	Rapper 1	Song Seungho
A2	5	Fresh & Cool	"Merry-Go-Round"	Lyrics & Composition: Cho Wonsang & DINT; Choreography: Ryu D	부메랑 (Boomerang)	1	227	3	Rapper 2	Sakurada Kenshin
A1	4	Sexy & Bad	"Trigger"	Lyrics & Composition: Park Seulgi & Roydo; Choreography: Ryu D	취향 저격 (Right Up Your Alley)	2	187	6	Main Vocal	Lynn Lynn
A1	4	Sexy & Bad	"Trigger"	Lyrics & Composition: Park Seulgi & Roydo; Choreography: Ryu D	취향 저격 (Right Up Your Alley)	2	187	5	Lead Vocal 1	Yichen
A1	4	Sexy & Bad	"Trigger"	Lyrics & Composition: Park Seulgi & Roydo; Choreography: Ryu D	취향 저격 (Right Up Your Alley)	2	187	2	Lead Vocal 2	Jang Yeojun
A1	4	Sexy & Bad	"Trigger"	Lyrics & Composition: Park Seulgi & Roydo; Choreography: Ryu D	취향 저격 (Right Up Your Alley)	2	187	7	Sub Vocal 1	Park Junseo
A1	4	Sexy & Bad	"Trigger"	Lyrics & Composition: Park Seulgi & Roydo; Choreography: Ryu D	취향 저격 (Right Up Your Alley)	2	187	1	Sub Vocal 2	Ma Jingxiang
A1	4	Sexy & Bad	"Trigger"	Lyrics & Composition: Park Seulgi & Roydo; Choreography: Ryu D	취향 저격 (Right Up Your Alley)	2	187	3	Rapper 1	Jeon Minwook
A1	4	Sexy & Bad	"Trigger"	Lyrics & Composition: Park Seulgi & Roydo; Choreography: Ryu D	취향 저격 (Right Up Your Alley)	2	187	4	Rapper 2	Kim Hyunwoo
A3	2	Old skool & Retro	"Kool-Aid"	Lyrics & Composition: Benjamin 55 & Young Chance; Choreography: Ryu D	쿨에이드 (Kool-Aid)	5	54	7	Main Vocal	Chae Heeju
A3	2	Old skool & Retro	"Kool-Aid"	Lyrics & Composition: Benjamin 55 & Young Chance; Choreography: Ryu D	쿨에이드 (Kool-Aid)	5	54	5	Lead Vocal	Fong Atilla
A3	2	Old skool & Retro	"Kool-Aid"	Lyrics & Composition: Benjamin 55 & Young Chance; Choreography: Ryu D	쿨에이드 (Kool-Aid)	5	54	2	Sub Vocal 1	Kim Joohyun
A3	2	Old skool & Retro	"Kool-Aid"	Lyrics & Composition: Benjamin 55 & Young Chance; Choreography: Ryu D	쿨에이드 (Kool-Aid)	5	54	3	Sub Vocal 2	Kim Joonwoo
A3	2	Old skool & Retro	"Kool-Aid"	Lyrics & Composition: Benjamin 55 & Young Chance; Choreography: Ryu D	쿨에이드 (Kool-Aid)	5	54	6	Sub Vocal 3	Lee Gunwoo
A3	2	Old skool & Retro	"Kool-Aid"	Lyrics & Composition: Benjamin 55 & Young Chance; Choreography: Ryu D	쿨에이드 (Kool-Aid)	5	54	1	Rapper 1	Kim Jeongmin
A3	2	Old skool & Retro	"Kool-Aid"	Lyrics & Composition: Benjamin 55 & Young Chance; Choreography: Ryu D	쿨에이드 (Kool-Aid)	5	54	4	Rapper 2	Kim Sihun
A4	1	Nostalgic & Sentimental	"Time After Time"	Lyrics & Composition: FRANTS; Choreography: Bada Lee	탐탐 (Time Time)	4	79	2	Main Vocal	Yoo Youngseo
A4	1	Nostalgic & Sentimental	"Time After Time"	Lyrics & Composition: FRANTS; Choreography: Bada Lee	탐탐 (Time Time)	4	79	4	Lead Vocal 1	Lee Hanbin (Note: Lee Hanbin and Binghua swapped the main lines of their part but still had the rest of their respective parts lines. (Meaning Hanbin took the rap, and Binghua took the intro))
A4	1	Nostalgic & Sentimental	"Time After Time"	Lyrics & Composition: FRANTS; Choreography: Bada Lee	탐탐 (Time Time)	4	79	7	Lead Vocal 2	Wu Chenyu
A4	1	Nostalgic & Sentimental	"Time After Time"	Lyrics & Composition: FRANTS; Choreography: Bada Lee	탐탐 (Time Time)	4	79	6	Sub Vocal 1	Shin Jaewon
A4	1	Nostalgic & Sentimental	"Time After Time"	Lyrics & Composition: FRANTS; Choreography: Bada Lee	탐탐 (Time Time)	4	79	5	Sub Vocal 2	Oh Taehwan
A4	1	Nostalgic & Sentimental	"Time After Time"	Lyrics & Composition: FRANTS; Choreography: Bada Lee	탐탐 (Time Time)	4	79	1	Sub Vocal 3	Woo Hajoon
A4	1	Nostalgic & Sentimental	"Time After Time"	Lyrics & Composition: FRANTS; Choreography: Bada Lee	탐탐 (Time Time)	4	79	3	Rapper	Binghua

== Final Match (Episode 11–12) ==
During the third assembly ceremony, surviving contestants were each assigned to one of three songs for the finale live show, being Psycho, Act Up, and Antidote, making teams based on the fans' assembly votes. Unlike most of the time when contestants decide on parts collectively as a group, this time the method of pushing others out of your desired position was used. Starting from Psycho, then Antidote, then Act Up, the lowest-ranked contestant would choose their desired part first. The next contestants in line would choose their desired part, but if it were to be already occupied by another contestant, the higher-ranked contestant would have the privilege to push them out of their desired part and relocate them to another part, also regardless of if that part already has someone else there. Lastly for parts, the killing part of each song will be decided by World Assemblers, given to the contestant with the most likes on their video cumulated across all official Project 7 SNS accounts within 24 hours post-airing of Episode 11.

Color key

Killing Part
Leader

PROJECT 6: Final Match
Performance			Contestant	
#	Song	Production Credit	Position	Name
3	"PSYCHO"	Lyrics & Composition: KENZIE; Choreography: Ryu D	Main Rapper	Sakurada Kenshin
3	"PSYCHO"	Lyrics & Composition: KENZIE; Choreography: Ryu D	Main Vocal	Kang Hyunwoo
3	"PSYCHO"	Lyrics & Composition: KENZIE; Choreography: Ryu D	All Rounder	Jeon Minwook
3	"PSYCHO"	Lyrics & Composition: KENZIE; Choreography: Ryu D	Sub Rapper 1	Kim Hyunwoo
3	"PSYCHO"	Lyrics & Composition: KENZIE; Choreography: Ryu D	Sub Rapper 2	Song Seungho
3	"PSYCHO"	Lyrics & Composition: KENZIE; Choreography: Ryu D	Sub Vocal 1	Kim Jeongmin
3	"PSYCHO"	Lyrics & Composition: KENZIE; Choreography: Ryu D	Sub Vocal 2	Jang Yeojun
1	"ACT UP"	Lyrics & Composition: JAYJAY & Young Chance; Choreography: Bada Lee	Main Vocal	Ahn Junwon
1	"ACT UP"	Lyrics & Composition: JAYJAY & Young Chance; Choreography: Bada Lee	Lead Vocal	Park Junseo
1	"ACT UP"	Lyrics & Composition: JAYJAY & Young Chance; Choreography: Bada Lee	Sub Vocal 1	Jung Seyun
1	"ACT UP"	Lyrics & Composition: JAYJAY & Young Chance; Choreography: Bada Lee	Sub Vocal 2	Andy
1	"ACT UP"	Lyrics & Composition: JAYJAY & Young Chance; Choreography: Bada Lee	Main Rapper	Ma Jingxiang
1	"ACT UP"	Lyrics & Composition: JAYJAY & Young Chance; Choreography: Bada Lee	Sub Rapper 1	Yichen
1	"ACT UP"	Lyrics & Composition: JAYJAY & Young Chance; Choreography: Bada Lee	Sub Rapper 2	Lynn Lynn
2	"Antidote"	Lyrics & Composition: FRANTS; Choreography: Bada Lee	Main Vocal	Kim Sihun
2	"Antidote"	Lyrics & Composition: FRANTS; Choreography: Bada Lee	Lead Vocal 1	Yoo Youngseo
2	"Antidote"	Lyrics & Composition: FRANTS; Choreography: Bada Lee	Lead Vocal 2	Nam Jiwoon
2	"Antidote"	Lyrics & Composition: FRANTS; Choreography: Bada Lee	Sub Vocal 1	Seo Kyoungbae
2	"Antidote"	Lyrics & Composition: FRANTS; Choreography: Bada Lee	Sub Vocal 2	Kim Sungmin
2	"Antidote"	Lyrics & Composition: FRANTS; Choreography: Bada Lee	Sub Vocal 3	Binghua
2	"Antidote"	Lyrics & Composition: FRANTS; Choreography: Bada Lee	Rapper	Woo Hajoon
