= Flash (X1 song) =

2019 debut single by X1

Single by X1

from the EP Emergency: Quantum Leap
- Language: Korean
- B-side: "Like Always"
- Released: August 27, 2019
- Recorded: 2019
- Genre: K-pop; Future bass
- Length: 3:33
- Label: Swing; Stone Music
- Songwriters: Score; Megatone; Onestar (Monotree); 88247

Music video
- "Flash" on YouTube

"Flash" (stylized as FLAϟH) is the debut single by South Korean boy band X1, released on August 27, 2019 by Swing Entertainment as the lead single from their debut extended play (EP) Emergency: Quantum Leap. It was released alongside its music video, and was made available as a digital single, which features "Like Always" as the B-side. The lyrics for the song was written by Score, Megatone and Onestar (Monotree).

== Composition ==
"Flash" was produced by 88247, Score, Megatone, Onestar (Monotree) and arranged by the latter three. The dynamic single flits between tempos, starting sleek before speeding up to vibrant pace, only to veer this way and that in the run up to the frenzied chorus and a dramatic beat drop. As much of a display of the members' vocals and rapping prowess as it is a performance-based song, "Flash" is a pure audio-visual experience meant to be simultaneously observed and listened to through the track's music video, during which X1's pristine, and aggressively impassioned, choreography takes center stage as they take a quantum leap towards the future of their career.

== Music video ==
On August 27, "Flash" was released along with its music video through various sites and music portals, including YouTube, Melon and Naver TV. The music video received 6,779,183 views on YouTube in the first 24 hours after being released, making it the third most viewed debut music video in the first 24 hours by a K-pop group at the time. It also became the fastest K-pop boy group debut music video to reach 100 million views, beating the record set by TXT's "Crown".

== Promotion ==
The group debuted on August 27, 2019, with a debut showcase at Gocheok Sky Dome.

The group had their first music show performance on Mnet's M! Countdown on August 29, 2019. They won their first music trophy on SBS MTV's The Show on September 3 and became the fastest boy group to receive a music show win taking only 5 days to do so beating the record set by WINNER's "Color Ring".

== Commercial performance ==
“Flash” debuted at number 4 on MelOn, Korea's largest music subscription service and peaked at number 1. It also peaked at number 1 on Naver and at number 4, 2 and 2 on Mnet, Bugs, and Soribada respectively and also peaked at number 6 on Genie and number 13 on Flo.

The single debut at number 26 and 1 on the Gaon Weekly Digital Chart and Gaon Weekly Download Chart respectively. It also debut at number 51 and 198 on the Gaon Weekly and Monthly Streaming Charts and peaked at number 37 and 47 respectively. On the Gaon Monthly Digital and Download Chart it peaked at number 46 and 25 respectively.

== Charts ==
=== Weekly charts ===
Chart (2019)	Peak position
South Korea (Gaon)	26

=== Monthly charts ===
Chart (2019)	Peak position
South Korea (Gaon)	46

== Accolades ==
=== Music program wins ===
Program	Date	Ref.
The Show (SBS MTV)	September 3, 2019	
The Show (SBS MTV)	September 10, 2019	
Show Champion (MBC Music)	September 4, 2019	
Show Champion (MBC Music)	September 18, 2019	
M Countdown (Mnet)	September 5, 2019	
M Countdown (Mnet)	September 12, 2019	
M Countdown (Mnet)	September 19, 2019	
Music Bank (KBS)	September 6, 2019	
Music Bank (KBS)	September 13, 2019	
Inkigayo (SBS)	September 8, 2019	
Inkigayo (SBS)	September 15, 2019	

== See also ==
- List of M Countdown Chart winners (2019)
