= The Dream Chapter: Star =

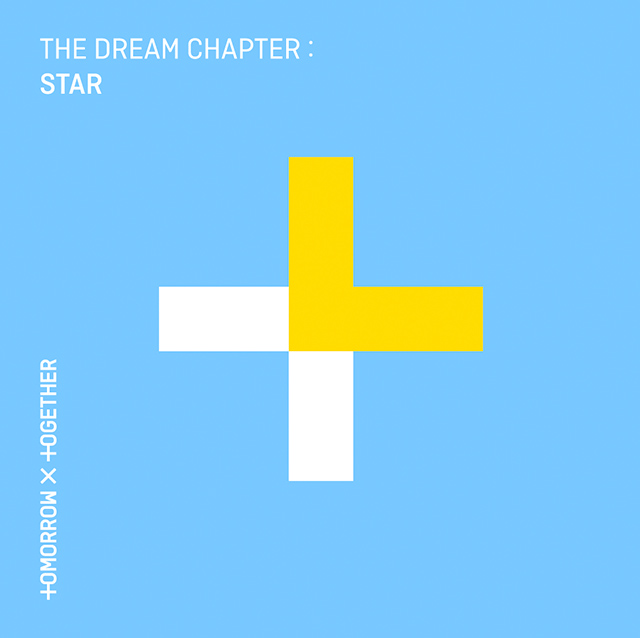
- Digital cover

EP by Tomorrow X Together
- Released: March 4, 2019
- Length: 17:28
- Languages: Korean; English
- Labels: Big Hit; Republic
- Producers: Slow Rabbit; The Futuristics; Daniel Celestin; Young Ho Bae

Tomorrow X Together chronology
The Dream Chapter: Star (2019)	The Dream Chapter: Magic (2019)

Singles from The Dream Chapter: Star
- 1. "Crown" Released: March 4, 2019; 2. "Cat & Dog" Released: May 3, 2019

The Dream Chapter: Star (stylized The Dream Chapter: STAR; Korean: 꿈의 장: Star; RR: Kkumui jang: Star) is the debut extended play by South Korean boy band Tomorrow X Together, released by Big Hit Entertainment and Republic Records, and distributed by iRiver Inc on March 4, 2019, in both digital and physical versions.

== Background ==
Tomorrow X Together was first announced in January through a series of videos revealing the members one by one. On February 22, the track list for the debut album was released. On March 4, the band held their debut stage on Mnet performing their debut single "어느날 머리에서 뿔이 자랐다 (Crown)", "Blue Orangeade" and "별의 낮잠 (Nap of a star)". On April 7, the lyric video of the promo single "Blue Orangeade" was published on Big Hit's YouTube Channel. Subsequently, a music video for the official follow-up second single "Cat & Dog" was released on April 25 at midnight KST on the same channel. The digital promo single "Our Summer (Acoustic Mix)" was announced and released on May 31, with a ten-hour notice from Big Hit Entertainment's official Twitter account. Without any prior announcement, on June 5 a music video for "Nap of a star" was released on Big Hit's YouTube channel.

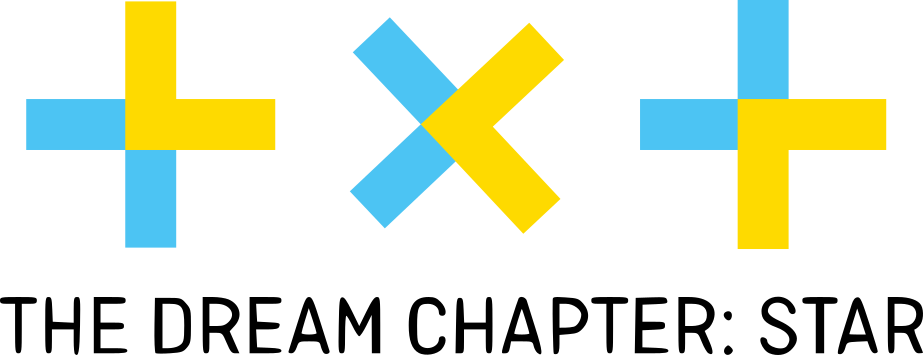
The band's modified logo used for promotional activities

== Track listing ==
Credits adapted from album's liner notes.

No.	Title	Writer(s)	Producer(s)	Length
1.	"Blue Orangeade"	Slow Rabbit; Jonatan Gusmark; Ludvig Evers; Cazzi Opeia; Ellen Berg; Supreme Boi	Slow Rabbit	3:06
2.	"Crown" (어느 날 머리에서 뿔이 자랐다; Eoneu nal meorieseo ppuri jaratda; 'One day, a horn grew from my head')	Slow Rabbit; Melanie Joy Fontana; Michel "Lindgren" Schulz; Supreme Boi; "Hitman" Bang; Mayu Wakisaka	Slow Rabbit	3:51
3.	"Our Summer"	Alex Schwartz; Joe Khajadourian; Delacey; Jesse Saint John; Shae Jacobs; "Hitman" Bang; Adora	The Futuristics	3:20
4.	"Cat & Dog"	Daniel "June Nawakii" Celestin; Supreme Boi; Darel "Bebe Da Rich" Ituta	June Nawakii; Supreme Boi^{[c]}	3:08
5.	"Nap of a Star" (별의 낮잠; Byeorui natjam; 'Nap of a star')	Lel; "Hitman" Bang; Slow Rabbit	Lel	4:03
Total length:				17:28

Notes

- ^[c] denotes an additional producer

== Personnel ==
Credits adapted from NetEase Music and Tidal.

- Tomorrow X Together – vocals, background vocals (track 1-2, 4), gang vocals (track 1)
- Adora – background vocals (track 1, 3), vocal arrangement (track 1), recording engineer (track 1, 3), digital editing (track 1, 3)
- Supreme Boi – background vocals (track 1, 4), gang vocals (track 1), vocal arrangement (track 1-2, 4), additional instrumentation and programming (track 4), recording engineer (track 4), digital editing (track 4)
- Jonatan Gusmark (Moonshine) – background vocals (track 1)
- Ludvig Evers (Moonshine) – background vocals (track 1)
- Melanie Joy Fontana – background vocals (track 2)
- Jung Myeong-hoon – background vocals (track 2)
- Collin' – background vocals (track 3)
- Kim Hyun-jung – gang vocals (track 1)
- Im Ji-yeon – gang vocals (track 1)
- Yang Hee-ju – gang vocals (track 1)
- Kim Ji-yeon – gang vocals (track 1), recording engineer (track 1, 3, 5)
- Slow Rabbit – vocal arrangement (track 1-3, 5), keyboard (track 1-2), synthesizer (track 1-2, 5), additional rhythm programming (track 5), recording engineer (track 1-3), digital editing (track 1-3, 5)
- El Capitxn – vocal arrangement (track 3), digital editing (track 1, 3-4), recording engineer (track 3)
- Lee Tae-wook – guitar (track 2)
- The Futuristics – all instrumentation and programming (track 3)
- Daniel "June Nawakii" Celestin – keyboard (track 4), synthesizer (track 4)
- Lel – synthesizer (track 5), background vocals (track 5), vocal arrangement (track 5), digital editing (track 5)
- Jung Jae-pil – guitar (track 5)
- Park Jin-se – recording engineer (track 1, 3-5), digital editing (track 5)
- Jung Woo-yeong – recording engineer (track 1-5), digital editing (track 5)
- Michel “Lindgren” Schulz – recording engineer (track 2)
- Phil Tan – mixer (track 1-2)
- Yang Ga – mixer (track 3)
- Jaycen Joshua – mixer (track 4)
- Hector Castillo – mixer (track 5)
- Bill Zimmerman – assistant mixer (track 1-2)
- Jacob Richards – assistant mixer (track 4)
- Mike Seaberg – assistant mixer (track 4)
- DJ Riggins – assistant mixer (track 4)
- Carlos Imperatori – assistant mixer (track 5)

== Charts ==
=== Weekly charts ===
Chart (2019)	Peak position
Belgian Albums (Ultratop Flanders)	59
Canadian Albums (Billboard)	100
French Digital Albums (SNEP)	11
Japanese Albums (Oricon)	3
Scottish Albums (Official Charts)	71
South Korean Albums (Gaon)	1
Spanish Albums (PROMUSICAE)	58
Swiss Albums (Schweizer Hitparade)	58
UK Album Downloads (Official Charts)	20
US Billboard 200	140
US World Albums (Billboard)	1

=== Year-end charts ===
Chart (2019)	Position
South Korea (Gaon)	26

== Accolades ==
Year-end lists
Critic/Publication	List	Song	Rank	Ref.
Refinery29	The Best K-Pop Songs Of 2019	"Crown"	1	
PopCrush	Best Songs Of 2019	"Crown"	9	

Decade-end lists
Publication	Accolade	Song	Rank / Year	Ref.
British GQ	Best K-Pop songs of the decade	"Crown"	Year of 2019	

=== Music program awards ===
Song	Program	Date	Ref.
"Crown"	The Show (SBS MTV)	March 12, 2019	
"Crown"	M Countdown (Mnet)	March 14, 2019	
"Crown"	Show Champion (MBC M)	March 20, 2019	

== Certifications and sales ==
Region	Certification	Certified units/sales
Japan	—	24,796
South Korea (KMCA)	Platinum	203,795
United States	—	4,000
