= Crown (Tomorrow X Together song) =

2019 single by Tomorrow X Together

Single by Tomorrow X Together

from the EP The Dream Chapter: Star
- Language: Korean
- Released: March 4, 2019
- Genre: Synth-pop
- Length: 3:51
- Label: Big Hit; Republic
- Songwriters: Slow Rabbit; Melanie Joy Fontana; Michel "Lindgren" Schulz; Supreme Boi; "Hitman" Bang; Mayu Wakisaka
- Producer: Slow Rabbit

Tomorrow X Together singles chronology
"Crown" (2019)	"Cat & Dog" (2019)

Music video
- "Crown" on YouTube

"Crown" (Korean: 어느 날 머리에서 뿔이 자랐다; RR: Eoneu nal meorieseo ppuri jaratda; lit. 'One day, a horn grew from my head') (stylized in all caps) is a song recorded by South Korean boy band Tomorrow X Together as the lead single from their debut Korean extended play (EP) The Dream Chapter: Star. It was released on March 4, 2019, through Big Hit Entertainment and Republic Records.

== Background and release ==
Tomorrow x Together was announced in January 2019 to be debuting as Big Hit's first group since BTS. Big Hit began posting teasers on YouTube in late February.

== Lyrics ==
The lyrics of the song describe a boy that wakes up one day with horns on his head and begins to hate himself and withdraw from other people. He then meets another character, who has wings on their back, and learns to love himself. The band has described the song as being about the growing pains of puberty and adolescence.

== Music video ==
The video for the song was released on March 4, 2019, and was directed by Oui Kim. It surpassed 14.4 million views in the first 24 hours, setting the record for the shortest time among rookies who debuted that year. A choreography version of the video was released on March 18, 2019.

== Reception ==
The song was praised for its "fresh and energetic" sound and meaningful lyrics. Additionally, the group broke a record for the fastest act to reach first place on the Billboard World Digital Songs Chart.

== Credits and personnel ==
Credits adapted from Tidal.

- Tomorrow X Together – primary vocals
- Slow Rabbit – production, songwriting
- "Hitman" Bang – songwriting
- Mayu Wakisaka – songwriting
- Melanie Joy Fontana – songwriting
- Michel "Lindgren" Schulz – songwriting
- Supreme Boi – songwriting
- Phil Tan – mix engineering
- Bill Zimmerman – assistant mix engineering

== Charts ==
Chart performance for "Crown"
Chart	Peak position
New Zealand Hot Singles (Recorded Music NZ)	29
South Korea (Gaon)	86
South Korea (K-pop Hot 100)	21
US World Digital Songs (Billboard)	1

== Certifications ==
Certifications for "Crown"
Region	Certification	Certified units/sales
Brazil (Pro-Música Brasil)	Gold	20,000^{‡}
^{‡} Sales+streaming figures based on certification alone.

== Accolades ==
Music program awards
Program	Date	Ref.
The Show	March 12, 2019	
M Countdown	March 14, 2019	
Show Champion	March 20, 2019	

== Release history ==
Release history for "Crown"
Region	Date	Format	Label
Various	March 4, 2019	Digital download; streaming	Big Hit; Republic
Japan	January 14, 2020	Digital download; streaming	UMJ
