= Leejung Lee =

South Korean choreographer and dancer

- 이이정
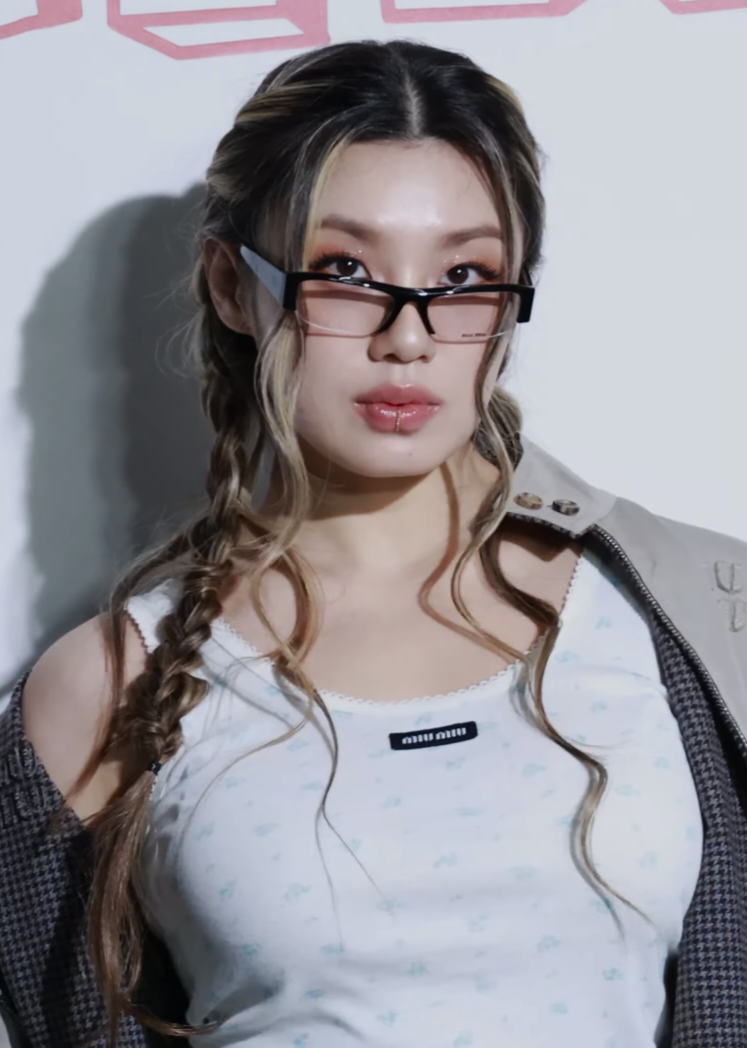
- Leejung in November 2025
- Born: Lee Leejung; August 9, 1998 (age 28); Seoul, South Korea
- Occupations: Choreographer; dancer
- Years active: 2014–present

Korean name
- Hangul: 이이정
- RR: I Ijeong
- MR: I Ijŏng

Stage name
- Hangul: 리정
- RR: Rijeong
- MR: Rijŏng

Leejung Lee (Korean: 이이정; born August 9, 1998) is a South Korean choreographer and dancer of The Black Label. She steadily gained recognition as the youngest and first female recruit of the "world-class" dance crew, Just Jerk, and propelled to domestic stardom following her appearance on Street Woman Fighter (2021). She choreographed the songs "Soda Pop" and "How It's Done" in the 2025 film KPop Demon Hunters.

== Life and career ==
=== 1998–2014: Early life ===
Lee Leejung was born on August 9, 1998, in Seoul, South Korea, as the youngest child after a brother. In childhood, Lee honed her athletic abilities since first grade of elementary school through swimming. Training for six consecutive years, she came to a halt as she felt her skills were not on par to an athlete after she deemed her co-peers "excessively good". Lee also trained in skiing and speed skating for one and two years, respectively, and enjoyed dancing to performances that appeared on television including "Into the New World" by Girls' Generation and "Tell Me" by Wonder Girls, whom she cited as artists from her generation. In the midst of third grade of elementary school, she participated in a talent show with "Tell Me" at her school. In this moment, she believed she was "born to dance" and recalled it as the first time she felt joy while dancing.

Her parents, however, believed dancing would serve as a distraction to her studies and were adamant on sending her abroad. Leejung was raised Christian and attended The King's Academy in Tennessee, United States for 4–5 years during sixth grade of elementary to end of middle school. Amidst her stay, her parents humorously proposed if she became the top student in her school, they'd allow her to receive dance lessons in South Korea during summer vacation. That same year, Leejung placed first in her entire school and was said to have an IQ of 150. Although they were rendered speechless, her parents allowed her to receive two months of lessons at age 16, her first formal experience to learn the art of dance. With plans set to return to US, Leejung had a change of heart and no longer wished to return.

While crying in the subway, she told her mother: "I think I'll be miserable If I return to the States". Her father yielded to her aspirations with an ultimatum, if she didn't show any result within the dance scenes within a year, she'll depart back to the States. Determined to pursue her dreams, 17-year-old Leejung auditioned to join the South Korean dance crew, Just Jerk Crew—whom she cited as the nation's top dance crew—during their first open recruitment. To this, she recalled: "I thought they'd never have an audition. So, when I heard they were having one, I thought I'd be so happy to dance with these guys". In October 2014, she was recruited as the first and only female addition to the crew and served as their youngest member until Kwak Yoon-young, their second female member, joined the following year through their second round of recruitments.

=== 2015–2019: Career beginnings and rising popularity ===
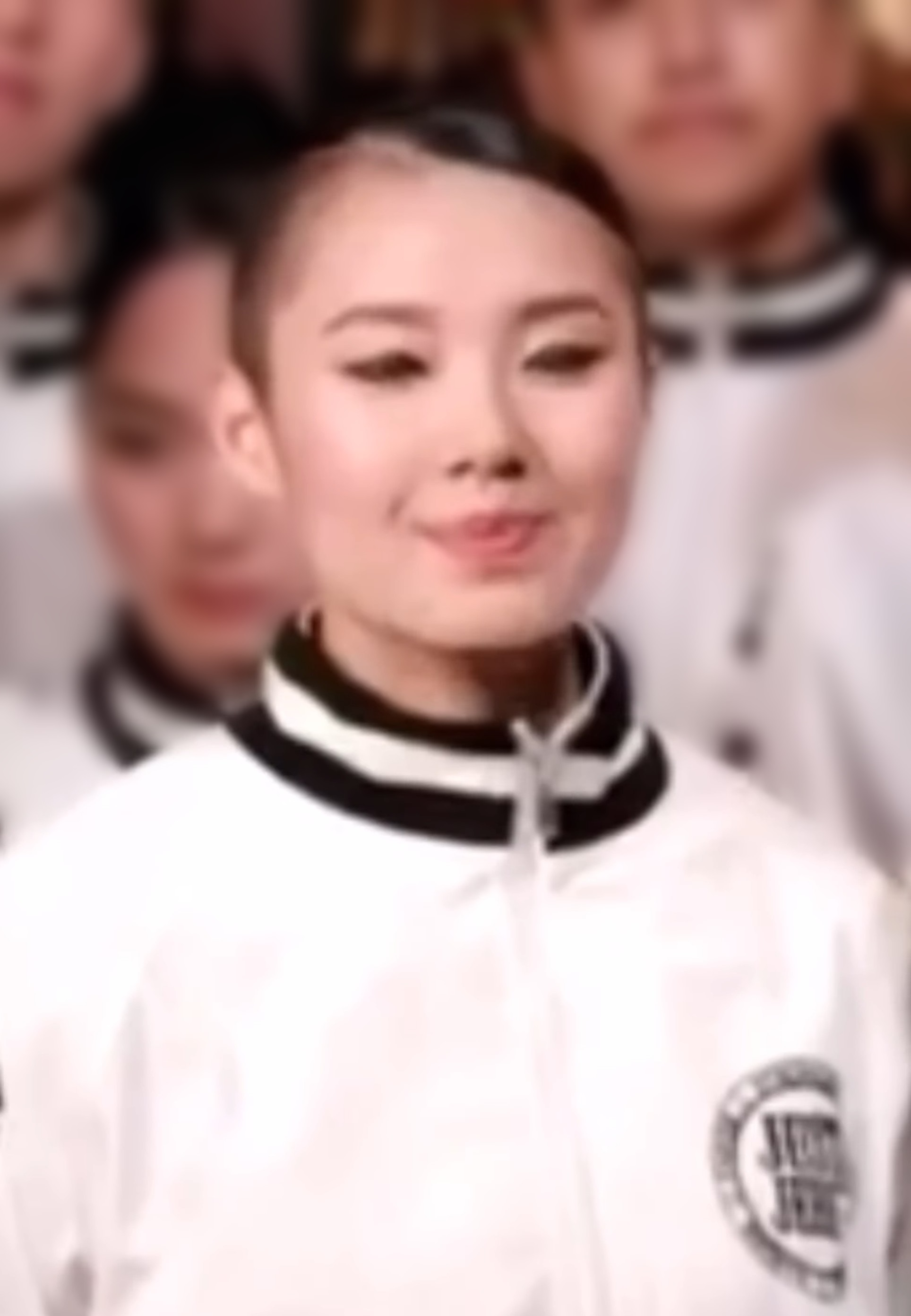
Leejung in 2017

In the time Leejung spent as part of Just Jerk, she participated in multiple dance competitions and also served as one of their English interpreters while abroad. Leejung received her first win at the 2016 Feedback 2Show under the duet category. That same year, Just Jerk placed first at the 2016 Body Rock Dance Competition in San Diego, California. As the sole representative of South Korea, they were the first from their country to win the title in its history. The achievement brought them wider recognition via YouTube with their performance spreading from word-of-mouth both at home and abroad. The video soon reached the attention of the production team behind America's Got Talent. Just Jerk received an invitation via phone call from the casting director to appear on the twelfth installation of their show that was scheduled for broadcast in 2017. With only a year of preparation, Leejung and her team salvaged and earned money for plane tickets, accommodation for one month, car rentals, and meals.

In its auditions Leejung and her crew were unanimously passed by all four judges, however, they failed to enter the finals and were eliminated in the quarter-finals. Their final stage became the team's most viewed performance, which was represented in Silla's Hwarang-style make-up and outfits. Their appearance on the show created a growth in views to their videos from the 2016 Body Rock Dance Competition. The crew were awarded "AAA Choice" at the 2017 Asia Artist Awards and were noticed by the organizers of the 2018 Pyeongchang Winter Olympics. They were formally invited to participate in the opening ceremony as performers. Together with Leejung, Just Jerk also placed runner-up at the 2019 Feedback Competition 7. Although she departed from her team shortly after, they still maintain a tight bond and express support and respect. Leejung still frequented the academy as a guest instructor and mentored their fourth generation recruit, Jo Na-in.

Leejung joined YGX Entertainment in 2019 under NWX, a choreographer division of the dance agency. Although her first work as a choreographer was a joint project with Kwak Yoon-young, Leejung's career advanced following her first solo work with "Fancy" by Twice. Her most notable work, the "shoulder dance" routine for "Wannabe" by Itzy became its point dance and was spread across the nation. Her credits include choreographing for Sunmi, Twice, (G)I-dle, Itzy, Jeon Somi and more. Leejung was also scouted to take on the role of a dance trainer for Nayeon and Momo of Twice, Rosé of Blackpink and Jeon Somi by their respective agencies.

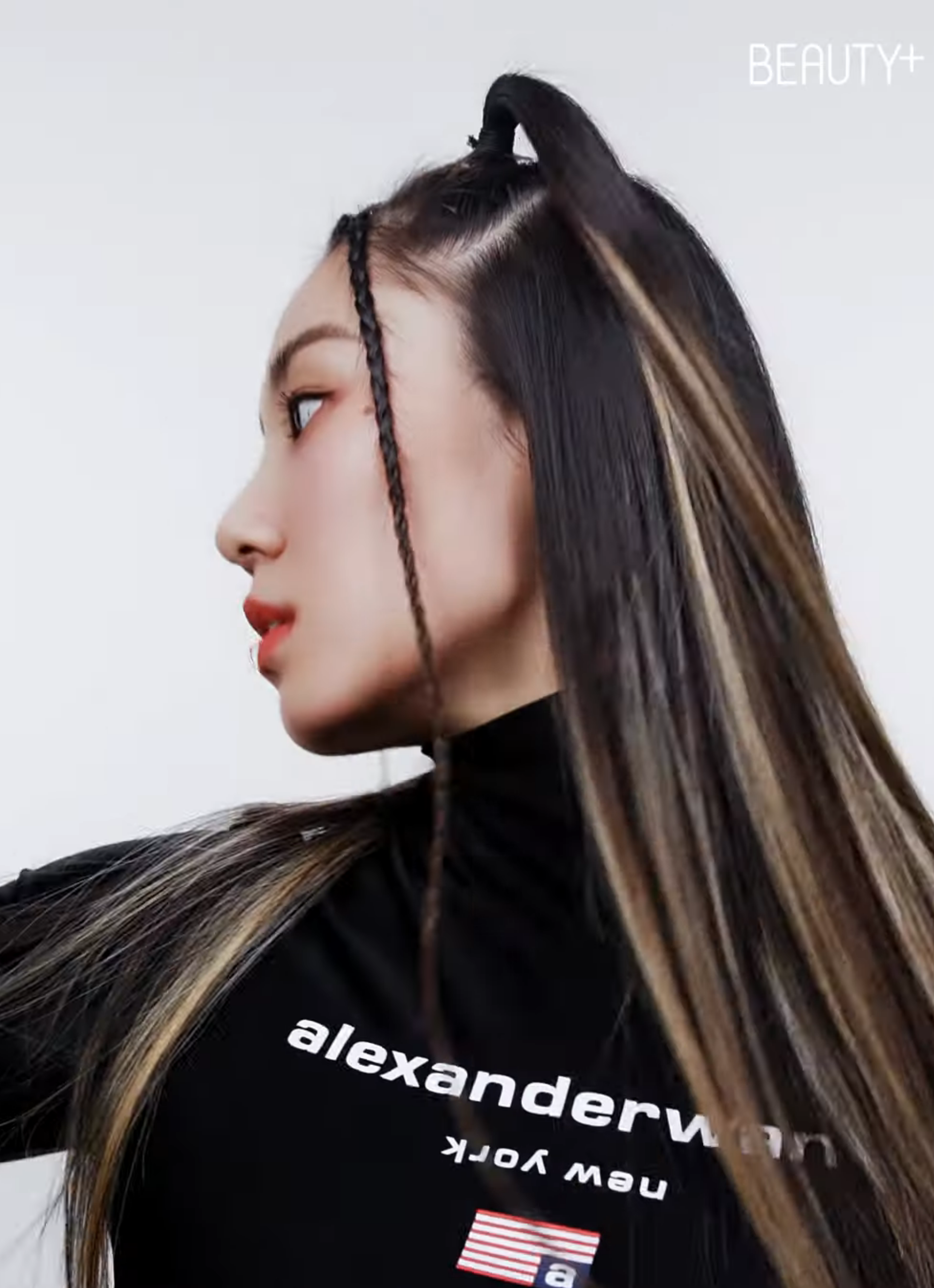
Leejung for Beauty+ in 2021

=== 2021–present: Breakthrough ===
In 2021, she received a casting offer via DM (Direct Message) from the casting director of Street Woman Fighter (2021). Without hesitation, she replied "yes" to their proposal. The head of her agency, however, advised instead of deciding on impulse, Leejung should have rationally pondered ahead of finalizing her decision. In the first meeting, she was told to recruit dancers and create a team. Hearing this, Leejung had four dancers in mind: "[...] I only gathered the people I wanted. Yeojin, who is small but dances with power has a lot in common with me. Jihyo's sexy and elegant dance, Isak's cool moves using her tall height and limbs, and B-girl Yell who not only breakdances but overall dances well. Each person was different, but it felt like we could work together. I thought it had to be us five." To her content, all four were interested and soon formed the project crew "YGX" with Leejung as its leader. She led her team to the semi-finals and finished the show in fifth place. Leejung reprised her role in Street Dance Girls Fighter (2021) as a "dance master" representing YGX. With Turns, her team finished the competition in first place. She did the choreograph for the songs "Soda Pop" and "How It's Done" in the 2025 film KPop Demon Hunters.

== Public image ==
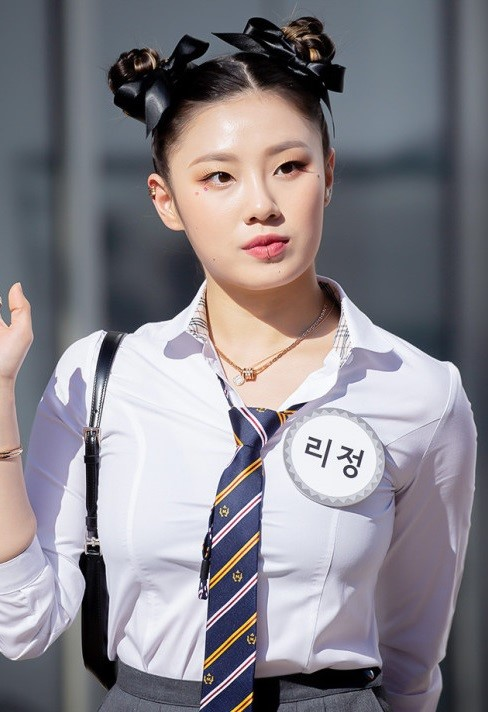
Leejung heading to film Knowing Bros in her "Pucca" hairstyle

Leejung was well known within the dance scene since her adolescent days due to her affiliations with the Just Jerk Crew. As the only female in the then-male dominated crew, she was put in the spotlight for her age, skills and gender and became a well-known figure for Generation MZ. Her line: "what did you do when you were 24 years old?" from Street Woman Fighter (2021) became viral and was perpetuated by celebrities and the general public. Despite its popularlity, Leejung confessed she regretted saying it and posted "everyone's twenty-four is precious". Leejung elaborated she spoke it in the heat of the competition to avoid any misunderstandings. Many identify Leejung by her signature "Pucca" hairstyle, lip ring and red lipstick and is often portrayed using these trademarks when re-enacting her, namely seen by Taeyeon of Girls' Generation, comedian Jo Se-ho and Aiki of Hook. Leejung is often referred to as "baby tiger", where she embodies complete seriousness when dancing in contrast to her often seen cheerfulness. Her work with various people resulted in Leejung being often cited as a "trendy choreographer".

== Artistry ==
=== Influence ===
Leejung cited her parents as to what created who she was today as an individual, referring to her father's perseverance and her mother's tenderness and delicacy. Her father's work ethics of loving his job has also influenced Leejung to love and enjoy her work.

== Other ventures ==
=== Endorsements ===
Leejung with the members of YGX—which include Yeojin, Jihyo, Isak and Yell—filmed promotional videos for the campaign "Unstoppable Joy" (2021) in collaboration with BMW Korea. Fashion shopping app Brandi announced, after the launch of its "One Day Delivery" campaign with YGX in November 2021, the amount of transaction had grown 130% compared to the previous month. The number of app downloads also increased by 170% compared to the same period of last year. Together with YGX, Leejung further collaborated with contemporary casual brand Plac and endorsed for Nike Korea's "Own the Floor" campaign, IM Bank of DGB Financial Group, and Intel Korea.

Leejung's first individual endorsement stemmed from "Descente Ground Main" by Descente Korea in 2017 alongside the female dancers of Just Jerk. With her appearance on Street Woman Fighter (2021), Leejung's brand value rose and was often sought out by the advertising industry. She endorsed for oral hygiene brand Toosty, Paris Baguette, Nike X Peaceminusone's Kwondo 1, TikTok Korea with Mino of Winner, and Part-timer Heaven with Jeon Somi.

== Choreography credits ==
2018–2020

Year	Artist	Song	Album	Ref.
2018	Wheein	"Easy"	Soar	
2018	Jennie	"Solo"	Solo	(Note: Leejung partook in the "dance break" portion of the choreography nearing the end of the single. She also choreographed for "Solo (live)", a remix of the song, which was performed at 2021 Blackpink: The Show and was released in Blackpink 2021 'The Show' Live on June 1, 2021.)
2019	Twice	"Fancy"	Fancy You	
2019	CIX	"Movie Star"	Hello Chapter 1: Hello, Stranger	
2019	Itzy	"Icy"	It'z Icy	
2019	Twice	"Breakthrough"	&Twice	
2019	Twice	"Feel Special"	Feel Special	
2020	Itzy	"Wannabe"	It'z Me	
2020	Twice	"More & More"	More & More	
2020	Sunmi	"Pporappippam" (보라빛 밤)	Non-album single	
2020	Jeon Somi	"What You Waiting For"	XOXO	
2020	(G)I-dle	"Dumdi Dumdi"	Dumdi Dumdi	
2020	Cignature	"Assa" (아싸)	Listen and Speak	
2020	Twice	"I Can't Stop Me"	Eyes Wide Open	
2020	Mino	"Ok Man" (featuring Bobby)	Take	
2020	Twice	"Cry for Me"	Non-album single	

2021–present

Year	Artist	Song	Album	Ref.
2021	Chungha	"Bicycle"	Querencia	
2021	Itzy	"In the Morning" (마.피.아. In the morning)	Guess Who	
2021	Twice	"Kura Kura"	Perfect World	
2021	Twice	"Alcohol-Free"	Taste of Love	
2021	iKon	"At Ease"	Kingdom Final: Who Is The King?	
2021	Jeon Somi	"Dumb Dumb"	XOXO	
2021	Sunmi	"Sunny"	1/6	
2021	Lisa	"Lalisa"	Lalisa	
2021	Lisa	"Money"	Lalisa	
2021	Itzy	"Loco"	Crazy in Love	
2021	Jessi	"Cold Blooded"	Non-album single	
2021	Jeon Somi	"XOXO"	XOXO	
2021	Cignature	"Boyfriend"	Dear Diary Moment	
2022	Blackpink	"Pink Venom"	Born Pink	
2022	Blackpink	"Shut Down"	Born Pink	
2023	Taeyong	"Shalala"	Shalala	
2023	Treasure (T5)	Move"	Reboot	

== Filmography ==
=== Television shows ===
Year	Title		Role	Notes	Ref.
Year	English	Korean	Role	Notes	Ref.
2017	America's Got Talent	—N/a	Contestant	Quarter-finalist (Just Jerk)	
2021	Street Woman Fighter	스트릿 우먼 파이터	Contestant	Fifth place (YGX)	
2021–2022	Street Dance Girls Fighter	스트릿댄스 걸스 파이터	Judge	Street Woman Fighter spin-off	
2022	Circle House	써클 하우스	Regular cast	—N/a	
2022	Be Mbitious	비 엠비셔스	Judge	Street Man Fighter prequel	
2022	Anybody Can Dance	뚝딱이의 역습	Regular cast	—N/a	
2022	Fly to the Dance	플라이 투 더 댄스	Regular cast	—N/a	
2023	HMLYCP	혜미리예채파	Regular cast	—N/a	

=== Music video appearances ===
Year	Title	Artist	Director	Length	Ref.
2021	"Cold Blooded" (with Street Woman Fighter)	Jessi	Highqualityfish	2:55	

== Tours ==
=== Concert participation ===
- Street Woman Fighter [On the Stage] (2021–2022)

== Accolades ==
=== Awards and nominations ===
Name of the award ceremony, year presented, award category, nominee(s) of the award, and the result of the nomination
Award ceremony	Year	Category	Nominee(s) / Work(s)	Result	Ref.
Mnet Asian Music Awards	2021	Best Choreographer of the Year	"Money"	Won	
MTV Video Music Awards	2023	Best Choreography	"Pink Venom" (with Kiel Tutin, Sienna Lalau, and Taryn Cheng)	Won	
Choreo Awards	2026	K-Pop Choreography Discovery Award	"Soda Pop" (with Ha Sung-jin)	Won	

=== State and cultural honours ===
Name of country or organization, award ceremony, year given, and name of honor
Country or organization	Award ceremony	Year	Honor	Ref.
South Korea	Korean Popular Culture and Arts Awards	2026	Minister of Culture, Sports and Tourism Commendation	

=== Listicles ===
Name of publisher, year listed, name of listicle, and placement
Publisher	Year	Listicle	Placement	Ref.
Forbes Asia	2026	30 Under 30	Placed	
