= 2019 Mnet Asian Music Awards =

Music awards annual ceremony

- Date: December 4, 2019
- Venue: Nagoya Dome, Nagoya, Japan
- Presented by: Cell Return
- Hosted by: Park Bo-gum
- Most awards: BTS (9)
- Website: 2019mama.com

Television/radio coverage
- Network: Mnet, across CJ E&M channels and other international networks, YouTube
- Runtime: 100 minutes (Red Carpet); 240 minutes (Main Ceremony)

The 2019 Mnet Asian Music Awards ceremony, organized by CJ E&M through its music channel Mnet, took place on December 4 at Nagoya Dome, Japan. It was the 21st ceremony and one of the largest in the show's history, with more than 40,000 people attending.

== Background ==
In August, Mnet responded to reports regarding the venues of the year's ceremony as Hong Kong, where it had been held in the past, was deemed unsafe due to political conflict in the city. On September 29, Mnet announced that the host location of 2019 MAMA will be at Nagoya, Japan, stating that cultural exchange must continue regardless of political matters.

All songs that are eligible to be nominated are songs released from November 3, 2018, to October 31, 2019.

== Criteria ==
Division	Online Voting	MAMA Professional Panel (Local + Foreign)	Music Sales	Record Sales	Social Media Voting	Global M/V View Counts
Artist of the Year Categories by Artist*	30%	30%	20%	20%	—	—
Song of the Year Categories by Genre**	20%	40%	30%	10%	—	—
Album of the Year	—	40%	—	60%	—	—
Special Prize***	—	70%	—	—	—	30%
Worldwide Icon of the Year Global Top 10 Fans' Choice	60%	—	—	—	20%	20%
*Best New (M)ale/(F)emale Artist, Best M/F Artist, Best M/F Group; **Best Dance Performance (Solo/M/F Group), Best Vocal Performance (M/F/Group), Best HipHop & Urban Music, Best Band Performance, Best Collaboration, Best OST; ***Best Music Video

== Performers ==
The following individuals and groups, listed in order of appearance, presented awards or performed musical numbers.

Artist(s)	Song(s)	Stage theme
Ateez	"Hala Hala", "Say My Name"	Red Carpet Special Stage
UNINE	"Set It Off"	Red Carpet Special Stage
Itzy	"Dalla Dalla", "Icy"	"It's ITZY"
TXT	"Intro, Run Away"	"The Next Dream Chapter"
Chungha	"Intro", "Blue Haze", "Gotta Go"	"The Genesis Of Time"
Monsta X	"Forever", "Never Die", "Intro", "Follow"	"Who Is Real?"
Hwasa	"New Rules"	"Make The New Rules"
Dua Lipa	"Don't Start Now"	"Make The New Rules"
Oneus; Ateez	Oneus: "Sherlock (Clue + Note)", "Something", "Don't Wanna Cry", "Rough", "Lit"; Ateez: "Wonderland", "Blood, Sweat & Tears", "View", "Good Bye Baby"	"Greatest Expectations"
WayV	"Intro", "Moonwalk", "Take Off"	"Pioneer: V"
Got7	"Eclipse", "You Calling My Name", "Crash & Burn"	"Phases Of The Moon"
Seventeen	"Intro", "Fear", "Hit"	"Alternate Universe #17"
Mamamoo; Park Jin-young	"Intro", "Twit", "Don't Leave Me", "Hip" (Remix ver.), "You're the One (Party ver.) + "Who's Your Mama?", "Yes I Am", "Fever"	"Glamorous Party"
Twice	"Intro", "Feel Special", "Fancy"	"Everything's all right"
BTS	"Intro", "N.O", "We Are Bulletproof Pt. 2", "Boy with Luv", "Mikrokosmos", "Dionysus"	"Map of the Soul: Journey to Myself"

== Presenters ==
2019 Mnet Asian Music Awards host

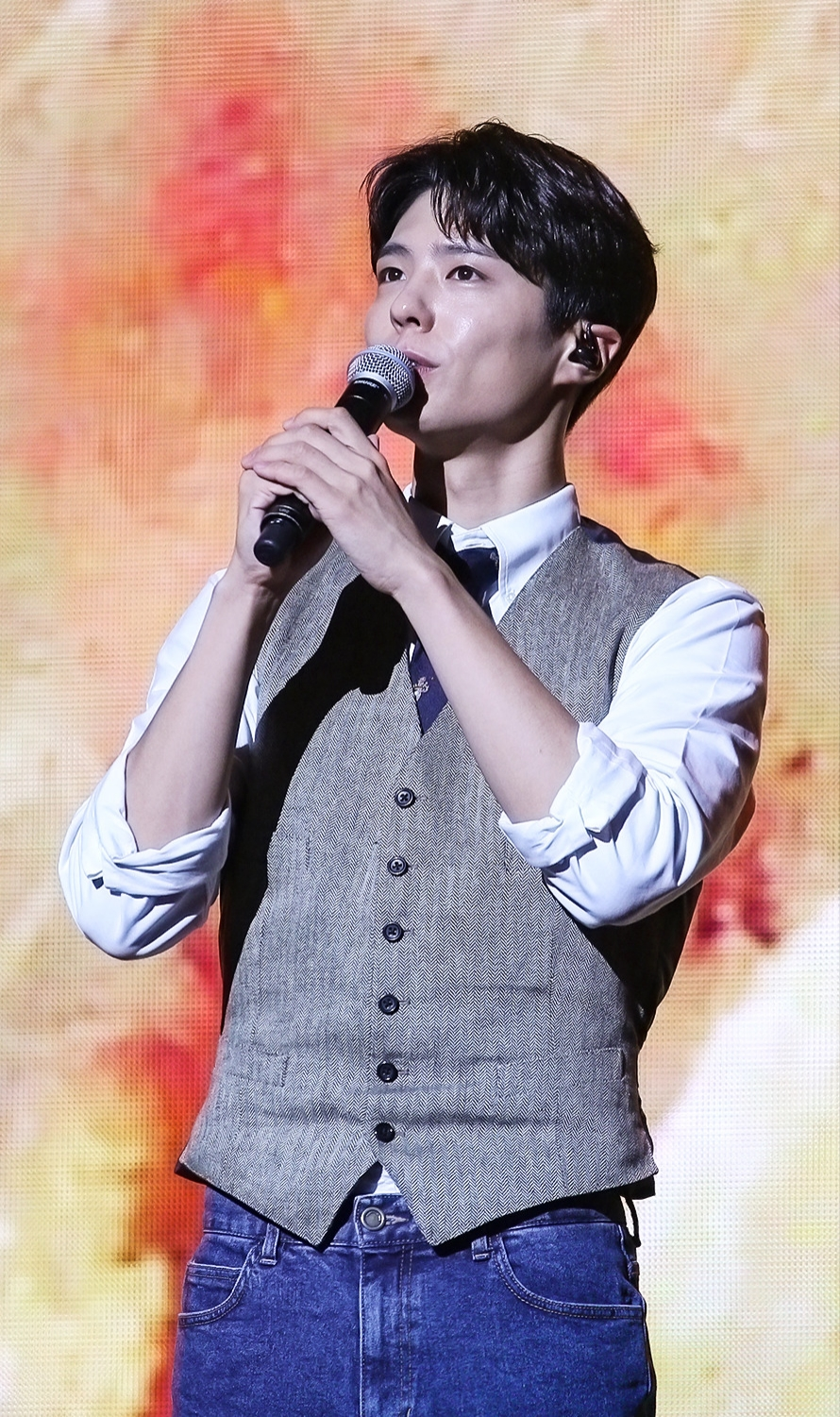
Park Bo-gum

- Park Bo-gum – host
- Lee Sang-yeob & Jung Hye-sung – presented Best Male & Female Group
- Kim Byung-hyun & Yoon Ji-ni – presented World Performer, Favorite Vocal & Dance Performance
- Shin A-young & Tsukasa Saito – presented Favorite Male & Female Artist
- Lee Yi-kyung & Karata Erika – presented Best New Male & Female Artist
- Jimmy Fallon (recorded at NBC Studios in NYC) – presented Album of the Year
- Kentaro Sakaguchi – presented Best Dance Performance – Male & Female Group
- Lee Sang-yeob & Lee Yu-bi – presented Worldwide Fans' Choice
- Ji Sook & Joo Woo-jae – presented Best Female Artist & Best New Asian Artist
- Lee Kwang-soo & Choi Yu-hwa – presented Worldwide Fans' Choice
- Chang Chen – presented Worldwide Icon of the Year
- Lee Soo-syuk & Gulnazar – presented Best Dance Solo Performance & Best Urban/Hip-Hop Music
- Park Tam-hee – presented Breakthrough Achievement Award
- Cha Sung-won – presented Song of the Year
- Shin Seung-hun – presented Artist of the Year

== Winners and nominees ==
Winners are listed first and highlighted in boldface. Online voting opened on the official MAMA website, Mwave app, and Twitter an hour after the announcement of nominees on October 22, 2019. Voting ended on December 4, 2019.

=== Main Awards ===
Artist of the Year (Daesang)	Song of the Year (Daesang)
**BTS**; Blackpink; Exo; Twice; Chungha	**BTS – "Boy with Luv"**; Blackpink – "Kill This Love"; Exo – "Tempo"; Twice – "Fancy"; Chungha – "Gotta Go"
Album of the Year (Daesang)	Worldwide Icon of the Year (Daesang)
**BTS – Map of the Soul: Persona**; Blackpink – Kill This Love; Exo – Don't Mess Up My Tempo; Twice – Fancy You; Seventeen – An Ode	**BTS**; Blackpink; Exo; Got7; Ateez; Monsta X; X1; Seventeen; Twice; TXT
Best Male Group	Best Female Group
**BTS**; Exo; NCT 127; Got7; Seventeen; Monsta X	**Twice**; Blackpink; Red Velvet; Mamamoo; Iz*One; GFriend
Best Male Artist	Best Female Artist
**Baekhyun**; Paul Kim; Taemin; Park Hyo Shin; Mino	**Chungha**; Jennie; Hwasa; Taeyeon; Heize
Best Dance Performance – Male Group	Best Dance Performance – Female Group
**BTS – "Boy with Luv"**; Exo – "Tempo"; Got7 – "Eclipse"; Monsta X – "Alligator"; NU'EST – "Bet Bet"; Seventeen – "Fear"	**Twice – "Fancy"**; Iz*One – "Violeta"; GFriend – "Sunrise"; Red Velvet – "Zimzalabim"; Blackpink – "Kill This Love"; (G)I-dle – "Senorita"
Best Dance Performance – Solo	Best Vocal Performance – Solo
**Chungha – "Gotta Go"**; Hwasa – "Twit"; Taemin – "Want"; Sunmi – "Lalalay"; Jennie – "Solo"	**Taeyeon – "Four Seasons"**; Ben – "180 Degree"; Chen – "Beautiful Goodbye"; Park Bom – "Spring"; Kim Jae Hwan – "Begin Again"; Jang Bum June – "Karaoke"
Best Vocal Performance – Group	Best Collaboration
**BOL4** **– "Bom"**; AKMU – "How Can I Love the Heartbreak, You're the One I Love"; Winner – "Millions"; Davichi – "Unspoken Words"; Mamamoo – "Gogobebe"; BtoB – "Beautiful Pain"	**Lee So-ra feat. Suga of BTS – "Song Request"**; Soyou & Ovan – "Rain Drop"; Jang Hye-jin & Yoon Min-soo – "Drunk on Love"; Chang Mo, Hash Swan, Ash Island & Kim Hyoeun – "Band"; Heize feat. Giriboy – "We Don't Talk Together"
Best New Male Artist	Best New Female Artist
**TXT**; AB6IX; Ateez; Kim Jae-hwan; X1; Kang Daniel	**Itzy**; Rocket Punch; Jeon Somi; Bvndit; Everglow; Cherry Bullet
Best OST	Best Band Performance
**Gummy – "Remember Me" (Hotel del Luna)**; Jannabi – "Take My Hand" (Romance Is a Bonus Book); Jang Beom-jun – "Your Shampoo Scent In The Flowers" (Be Melodramatic); Paul Kim – "So Long" (Hotel del Luna); Ha Jin – "We All Lie" (Sky Castle)	**Jannabi – "For Lovers Who Hesitate"**; Day6 – "Time of Our Life"; MC the Max – "After You've Gone"; Nell – "Let's Part"; N.Flying – "Rooftop"
Best HipHop & Urban Music	Best Music Video
**Heize – "She's Fine"**; Mino – "Fiancé"; Epik High feat. Crush and IU – "Love Drunk"; Woo Won-jae feat. Giriboy – "Taste"; Crush – "Nappa"	**BTS – "Boy with Luv"**

=== Favorite Awards ===
Worldwide Fans' Choice Top 10
**BTS**; **Blackpink**; **Exo**; **Seventeen**; **TXT**; **ATEEZ**; **Monsta X**; **GOT7**; **X1**; **Twice**
Qoo10 Favorite Male Artist	Qoo10 Favorite Female Artist
**BTS**	**Twice**
Favorite Dance Performance	Favorite Vocal Performance
**Got7**	**Mamamoo**

=== Special awards ===
Category		Winner
Best Asian Artist	Thailand	Nont Tanont
Best Asian Artist	Mandarin	Li Ronghao
Best Asian Artist	Vietnam	Hoàng Thùy Linh
Best Asian Artist	Japan	Aimyon
Best Asian Artist	Indonesia	Andmesh Kamaleng
Best New Asian Artist	Thailand	Wanyai
Best New Asian Artist	Taiwan	OSN
Best New Asian Artist	Vietnam	K-ICM & Jack
Best New Asian Artist	Japan	King Gnu
Best New Asian Artist	Indonesia	Stephanie Poetri
Best New Asian Artist	China	WayV
World Performer		Monsta X
International Favorite Artist		Dua Lipa
Breakthrough Achievement		Seventeen
Best Producer of the Year		Starr Chen, Howe Chen & RAZOR
Best Composer of the Year		Pdogg
Best Engineer of the Year		Kwon Nam Woo
Best Art Director of the Year		Yuni Yoshida
Best Video Director of the Year		Lumpens
Best Choreographer of the Year		Kiel Tutin
Best Executive Producer of the Year		Bang Si-hyuk

=== Multiple awards ===
The following artist(s) received three or more awards:

Awards	Artist(s)
9	BTS
4	Twice

== Broadcast ==
The red carpet and main ceremony of the 2019 Mnet Asian Music Awards was broadcast worldwide via Mnet, across CJ E&M channels and other international networks and online via Mnet K-pop's YouTube account and Mnet's official website. The Red Carpet was live streamed on the official Mnet MAMA Twitter page.

Country	Network	
Worldwide	YouTube, Mwave	
South Korea	Mnet, OnStyle, O'live, XtvN, TVING	
Japan	Mnet Smart, Mnet Japan, VideoPass	
United States	Mnet America, Kcon.tv	
Hong Kong	ViuTV, ViuTVsix	tvN Asia
Macau	ViuTV, ViuTVsix	tvN Asia
Taiwan	ETTODAY	tvN Asia
Philippines	Myx	tvN Asia
Singapore	Mediacorp Toggle	tvN Asia
Indonesia	Indosiar, Vidio, JOOX	tvN Asia
Malaysia	JOOX	tvN Asia
Thailand	JOOX	tvN Asia
Myanmar	JOOX	tvN Asia
Sri Lanka	tvN Asia	
Cambodia	MyTV	
Vietnam	FPT Play HD	

Restricted access on some countries due to broadcasting rights.
