= Feel Special =

2019 extended play by Twice

- Digital cover

EP by Twice
- Released: September 23, 2019
- Genre: Pop
- Length: 23:26
- Languages: Korean; English
- Label: JYP

Twice chronology
Fancy You (2019)	Feel Special (2019)	&Twice (2019)

Singles from Feel Special
- 1. "Feel Special" Released: September 23, 2019

Feel Special is the eighth extended play by South Korean girl group Twice. It was released by JYP Entertainment on September 23, 2019. Marketed as the group's eighth "mini album" release, it consists of seven tracks, including the lead single of the same name and the Korean version of their Japanese single "Breakthrough".

The EP features genres including EDM, hip hop, synth-pop and 90s music, and all members of Twice participated in the album's production as songwriters. Music critics complimented the album's catchy production, the variety of music genres present in the EP, and the group's creative control over the EP's lyrics. It was a commercial success, debuting at number one on Gaon Album Chart and selling over 500,000 copies. It was Twice's best-selling album until the release of their succeeding EP, More & More.

== Background ==
Following the release of Fancy You in April, and the ongoing success of Twice's Twicelights World Tour, JYP Entertainment first revealed details about the group's upcoming album titled Feel Special with the title track of the same name on September 9, 2019, with its release slated for September 23 at 6PM KST. A teaser clip starring Nayeon was first unveiled on the same day. The following day, a teaser clip starring Jeongyeon was revealed. The tracklist for their upcoming album was also posted, revealing the credits for the title track "Feel Special" and for the Korean version of Twice's Japanese single "Breakthrough". On September 11, the group posted a teaser clip starring Momo, alongside individual teaser images for Nayeon, Jeongyeon, and Momo. When Momo's teaser clip was revealed, she went viral on Twitter due to her change of hairstyle, with her name ranking higher on the US Twitter real-time trending list than #AppleEvent, leading to American businessman Jack Phan raising the question, "What is Momo?". On September 12, a teaser clip featuring Sana was released.

Following the release of Sana's teaser clip, the group shared full details for their comeback's track list, revealing that Nayeon wrote lyrics for "Rainbow", Jihyo participated in "Get Loud", Dahyun helped write lyrics for "Trick It", and Momo penned "Love Foolish", with all group members being credited for the lyrics of "21:29". On September 13, a teaser video starring Jihyo was uploaded, followed by a teaser video starring Mina which was uploaded on the following day. On September 14, teaser images for Sana, Jihyo, and Mina were posted. On September 15, a teaser clip featuring Dahyun was uploaded and on the following day, an individual teaser clip starring Chaeyoung was released. Tzuyu's individual teaser video was revealed on September 17. On the same day, individual teaser images for Dahyun, Chaeyoung, and Tzuyu were uploaded.

Teaser photos featuring all members of the group were unveiled on September 18. The first music video teaser was uploaded by the group on the following day, alongside another set of group teaser photos. On September 21, a highlight medley for the album was released by the group. On September 22, Twice unveiled the online cover for Feel Special.

On September 23, Twice released the final music video teaser for the album's eponymous title track. The EP was officially released on the same day, with the group holding a press conference at the Yes24 Live Hall in Gwangjang-dong, Seoul.

== Composition ==
Feel Special is an extended play consisting of seven tracks featuring genres from EDM, hip hop and 90s music. The members of Twice participated in the album production as songwriters. The eponymous title track is described as a party-pop song featuring the usage of synth music, written and composed by J. Y. Park, who stated that he based the lyrics on a conversation that he had with the members of Twice. "Rainbow" features a British garage beat, and is penned by Nayeon. The song lyrically talks about self-confidence and self-discovery. "Get Loud", written by Jihyo, is classified as a dance song and further described as a "girl power anthem". "Trick It", written by Dahyun, features a "sweet, delicate" melody coupled with a disco beat with the song depicting on how one tells white lies for the happiness of a certain person. "Love Foolish" is a track with EDM and synth-pop influences, penned by Momo. "21:29" is described as an amalgamation of retro soul, lounge, RNB and 90s hip hop, with all members being credited for the track's lyrics. The song was stated to be dedicated for the group's fanbase. The closing track, "Breakthrough", is a Korean version of the group's fifth Japanese single from their album, &Twice, that heavily features brass music.

== Promotion ==
On the day of the album's release, JYP Entertainment released an official statement revealing that while member Mina participated in the production for Feel Special as well as the filming for their music video, she would continue her health-related hiatus due to anxiety concerns and thus would not participate in the promotional activities for the EP. Additionally, when the group held their first promotional showcase for Feel Special at the Yes24 Live Hall in Gwangjang-dong, Jihyo performed without doing the choreography, with JYP Entertainment stating that she was receiving medical treatment for a minor neck injury.

Twice appeared on JTBC television program Idol Room on September 24, 2019. They began their music show promotions for Feel Special with a performance on M Countdown on September 26. They also performed on KBS2' Music Bank, MBC's Music Core, and SBS' Inkigayo, among others. On September 27, the group performed at the MBN Hero Concert 2019 held at the Jamsil Indoor Gymnasium in Seoul. Members Nayeon, Jihyo, and Chaeyoung appeared as guests on the tvN television program Amazing Saturday-DoReMi Market on September 28.

== Critical reception ==
Writing for Sound Digest, Amanda Lee noted that Feel Special is an "exceptional comeback" following Twice's increased international presence after the release of Fancy You, stating that the tracks from the group's latest album "[is a] pop perfection and showcases the girls’ increasing presence in crafting timely songs that are relatable and catchy." Tamar Herman of Billboard magazine praised the group's creative control over the EP, and described the material as "an unrelenting show of pop perfection from the girl group". Billboard also included Feel Special in its "25 Best K-pop Albums of 2019: Critics' Picks" list ranking at number 14, citing the group's distinctive pop production seen in "Feel Special" and "Rainbow", as well as their venture into maturity with "Love Foolish" and "21:29". Chris Gillet from South China Morning Post Youngpost complimented the variety of music genres present in the album and how the group was able to mix genres "in a way most other acts cannot".

Crystal Bell from MTV News included the B-side "Love Foolish" in her "Best K-pop B-sides of 2019" list, ranking the song at number 1 and calling it proof that "Twice are capable of so much more than cheery hooks." Bell further stated that every B-side from Feel Special was deserving of a spot on the list. BuzzFeed included the B-side "Trick It" in their "20 Best K-pop B-sides of 2019" list, ranking at number 12, stating that the track "still goes strong on even the 210th listen." Cho Eun-jae of Idology ranked Feel Special at number four in the website's "2019: Album of the Year" list, stating that the album is "full of more wild and charismatic sound than ever, with a danceable mood that is the traditional virtue of JYP." They then stated that Twice's album quality is increasing throughout the development of their career.

In a mixed review, Kim Do-heon of IZM gave the album a rating of 2.5 over 5 points, praising the overall production, but stated that Feel Special is "not a sufficient basis for the transition to [more] mature and refined concepts."

== Commercial performance ==
Upon the release of Feel Special, Twice broke their own first-week album sales record when they achieved sales of 154,000 copies on Hanteo on September 29, 2019. Their previous EP release, Fancy You, initially held the record for highest first-week sales volume for a Korean girl group with 151,000 copies sold. The EP debuted atop the weekly Gaon Album Chart. The album also charted on both the Japan Digital Albums chart and the Oricon Albums Chart, debuting at numbers 2 and 3 respectively. The album was then certified Platinum by Gaon upon reaching 250,000 copies sold. Feel Special ranked second on the Monthly Gaon Album Chart for the month of September, recording sales of 368,842 copies. On October 29, Gaon confirmed that Feel Special had reached 400,000 copies sold in shipments, becoming Twice's best-selling album until it was surpassed by their succeeding EP release, More & More, in 2020. The album received a 2× Platinum certification from the Korea Music Content Association on March 10, 2022.

== Track listing ==
No.	Title	Lyrics	Music	Arrangement	Length
1.	"Feel Special"	J. Y. Park "The Asiansoul"	Park; Ollipop; Hayley Aitken	Lee Woo-min "collapsedone"	3:27
2.	"Rainbow"	Nayeon	Alexander Karlsson (JeL); Alexej Viktorovitch (JeL); Mihaela Borislavova Marinova; Nikol Genadieva Kaneva	Karlsson; Viktorovitch	2:58
3.	"Get Loud"	Jihyo; JQ	Ryan Jhun; Miro Markus; Anna Timgren	Jhun; Markus	3:08
4.	"Trick It"	Dahyun; JQ	Melanie Fontana; GG Ramirez; Jurek Reunamäki; 72	Reunamäki	3:15
5.	"Love Foolish"	Shim Eun-ji; Momo	Shim; Versachoi; Louise Frick Sveen	Versachoi; Shim	3:12
6.	"21:29"	Twice	Lee Joo-hyoung (MonoTree); Sophia Pae	Lee	3:49
7.	"Breakthrough" (Korean version)	Yu Shimoji; Olivia Choi (Note: Signifies a translator.)	Jan Baars; Rajan Muse; Ronnie Icon	Baars; Muse; Icon	3:37
Total length:					23:26

== Personnel ==
Credits are adapted from the album's liner notes.

=== Musicians ===
- Twice – vocals (all tracks), background vocals (7)
- Lee Woo-min "collapsedone" – all instruments, computer programming, guitar, synthesizers (1)
- Kim Yeon-seo – background vocals (1–5), vocal director (2, 4)
- Shim Eun-ji – vocal director (1)
- JeL – all instruments and programming (2)
- Miro Markus – keyboards, guitars, programming (3)
- Anna Timgren – background vocals (3)
- Jurek Reunamäki – drum programming, bass programming, synthesizer programming, keyboard (4)
- Melanie Fontana – vocal arrangement (4)
- Versachoi – bass, keyboard, drum (5)
- Jeok Jae – guitar (6)
- Lee Joo-hyoung – keyboard, vocal director (6)
- Sophia Pae – background vocals, vocal director (6)
- Jan Baars – all instruments (7)
- Rajan Muse – all instruments (7)
- Ikuco Tsutsumi – background vocals (7)
- Perrie – background vocals (7)
- Armadillo – vocal director (7)

=== Technical ===
- Choi Hye-jin – recording (1–2, 5–6)
- Eom Se-hee – recording (1–7)
- Lee Sang-yeop – recording (1, 5)
- Woo Min-jeong – recording (1, 3–5)
- Tony Maserati – mixing (1, 7)
- James Kraussie – mix engineer (1)
- David Kim – assistant mix engineer (1, 7)
- Park Jeong-eon – mastering (1–6)
- JeL – recording, music production, post production (2)
- Jeong Yu-ra – digital editing (2, 4, 7)
- Im Hong-jin – recording, mixing (2)
- Ahn Young – digital editing (3)
- Hanif "Hitmanic" Sabzevari – mixing (3)
- Lee Tae-seop – mixing (4)
- Yoon Won-kwon – mixing (5)
- Kang Seon-young – digital editing, recording (6)
- Lee Joo-hyoung – recording (6)
- Gu Jong-pil – mixing (6)
- Chris Gehringer – mastering (7)

== Charts ==
=== Weekly charts ===
Weekly chart performance of Feel Special
Chart (2019)	Peak position
French Download Albums (SNEP)	35
Japanese Albums (Oricon)	3
Japanese Digital Albums (Oricon)	2
Japanese Hot Albums (Billboard Japan)	13
Scottish Albums (Official Charts)	66
South Korean Albums (Gaon)	1
Spanish Albums (PROMUSICAE)	47
UK Album Downloads (Official Charts)	42
US Heatseekers Albums (Billboard)	10
US Independent Albums (Billboard)	27
US World Albums (Billboard)	6

=== Year-end charts ===
Year-end chart performance of Feel Special
Chart (2019)	Position
Japanese Albums (Oricon)	50
South Korean Albums (Gaon)	10

Chart (2020)	Position
South Korean Albums (Gaon)	73

== Certifications ==
Region	Certification	Certified units/sales
South Korea (KMCA)	2× Platinum	500,000^{^}
^{^} Shipments figures based on certification alone.

== Accolades ==
Awards and nominations for Feel Special
Year	Award	Category	Result	Ref.
2020	34th Golden Disc Awards	Album Bonsang	Won	
2020	34th Golden Disc Awards	Album Daesang	Nominated	
2020	9th Gaon Chart Music Awards	Artist of the Year – Physical Album (3rd Quarter)	Nominated	

== Release history ==
Release dates and formats for Feel Special
Region	Date	Format(s)	Label	Ref.
Various	September 23, 2019	Digital download; streaming	JYP	
South Korea	September 23, 2019	CD	JYP	

== See also ==
- List of certified albums in South Korea
- List of Gaon Album Chart number ones of 2019
