= Bvndit, Be Ambitious! =

Single album by Bvndit
- Released: April 10, 2019
- Genre: K-pop
- Length: 8:11
- Language: Korean
- Labels: MNH; Stone
- Producers: MosPick; Woo Sang Park

Bvndit chronology
Bvndit, Be Ambitious! (2019)	Be! (2019)

Singles from Bvndit, Be Ambitious!
- 1. "Hocus Pocus" Released: April 10, 2019

Bvndit, Be Ambitious! is the debut single album by South Korean girl group Bvndit, released on April 10, 2019 by MNH Entertainment and distributed by Stone Music Entertainment.

== Background ==
On March 13, 2019, MNH Entertainment, announced they will debut their first girl group called BVNDIT. They launched the band official website and SNS. The group consists of 5 members: Yiyeon, Songhee, Jungwoo, Simyeong, Seungeun. On March 27, 2019 the company announced that the group will debut with their single album called: Bvndit, Be Ambitious!. The album contains three songs: Be ambitious, Hocus Pocus and My Error. Teasers featuring each of the members for their music video were released from March 27 to April 9, 2019. On April 10, the song's music video were released online and through the Naver V App.

== Promotion ==
The music video for the title track "Hocus Pocus", was released on April 10, 2019, in conjunction with the single album which accumulated over 1 million views in its first 24 hours.

Bvndit had their debut showcase on Yes24 Live Hall in Gwangjang-dong, Seoul before the release of the single album. They performed their title track "Hocus Pocus" as well as the intro song of the album "Be, Ambitious!".

The group held their debut stage on April 11 on M Countdown, followed by performances on April 13–14 on Music Bank, Show! Music Core and Inkigayo, respectively. For the performing, they perform also "Be Ambitious!" from their album.

On April 23, the group also made an appearance in Idol Radio to promote their album, receiving praise for being very professional performers after having only just debuted.

== Track listing ==
No.	Title	Lyrics	Music	Arrangement	Length
1.	"Be Ambitious!"	VICENZO, Fuxxy & Any Masingga	VICENZO, Fuxxy & Any Masingga	VICENZO	1:08
2.	"Hocus Pocus"	MosPick	MosPick	MosPick	3:29
3.	"My Error" (연애의 온도)	Park Woo Sang	Park Woo Sang	Park Woo Sang	3:34
Total length:					8:11

== Release history ==
Region	Date	Format	Label
Various	April 10, 2019	Digital download	MNH Entertainment, Stone Music Entertainment
