= Carnival (Bvndit EP) =

EP by Bvndit
- Released: May 13, 2020
- Genre: K-pop
- Length: 13:21
- Language: Korean
- Labels: MNH; Stone

Bvndit chronology
Be! (2019)	Carnival (2020)	Re-Original (2022)

Singles from Carnival
- 1. "Children" Released: April 20, 2020; 2. "Jungle" Released: May 13, 2020

Carnival is the second extended play (EP) by South Korean girl group Bvndit, released on May 13, 2020, by MNH Entertainment and distributed by Stone Music Entertainment.

== Background ==
On April 28, MNH Entertainment confirmed that Bvndit would make a comeback with their second EP. On May 3, MNH Entertainment released the group's first promotional poster. On May 5, the second promotional poster was released. The following day, MNH Entertainment unveiled the track listing to the EP on their official social media accounts, revealing "Jungle" as the lead single.

== Release ==
The EP was released on May 13 through many Korean online music services, including Melon. For the global market, the album was made available on iTunes and Spotify. It was also released in physical format. It was also released in physical format.

== Music video ==
On May 7, a first teaser for the music video of "Jungle" was released. On May 11, a second teaser for the music video was released. On May 13, the official music video of "Jungle" was released.

== Track listing ==
Credits adapted from track listing and Melon.

Carnival track listing
No.	Title	Lyrics	Music	Arrangement	Length
1.	"Carnival"	VINCENZO	VINCENZO	VINCENZO	1:03
2.	"Jungle"	MosPick	MosPick	MosPick	3:04
3.	"Come and Get It"	Kim Yeon-seo	Coach & Sendo; Kim Yeon-seo	Coach & Sendo	2:59
4.	"Cool"	Anna Timgren; VINCENZO; Any Masingga; Fuxxy	VINCENZO; Any Masingga, Fuxxy; Anna Timgren	Any Masingga; VINCENZO	3:12
5.	"Children"	Park Woo-sang	Park Woo-sang	Park Woo-sang	3:01
Total length:					13:21

== Charts ==
Weekly chart performance for Carnival
Chart (2020)	Peak position
South Korean Albums (Gaon)	19

== Release history ==
Region	Date	Format	Label
Worldwide	May 13, 2020	Digital download	MNH Entertainment, Stone Music Entertainment
South Korea	May 13, 2020	CD, music download	MNH Entertainment, Stone Music Entertainment
