= Bvndit =

South Korean girl group

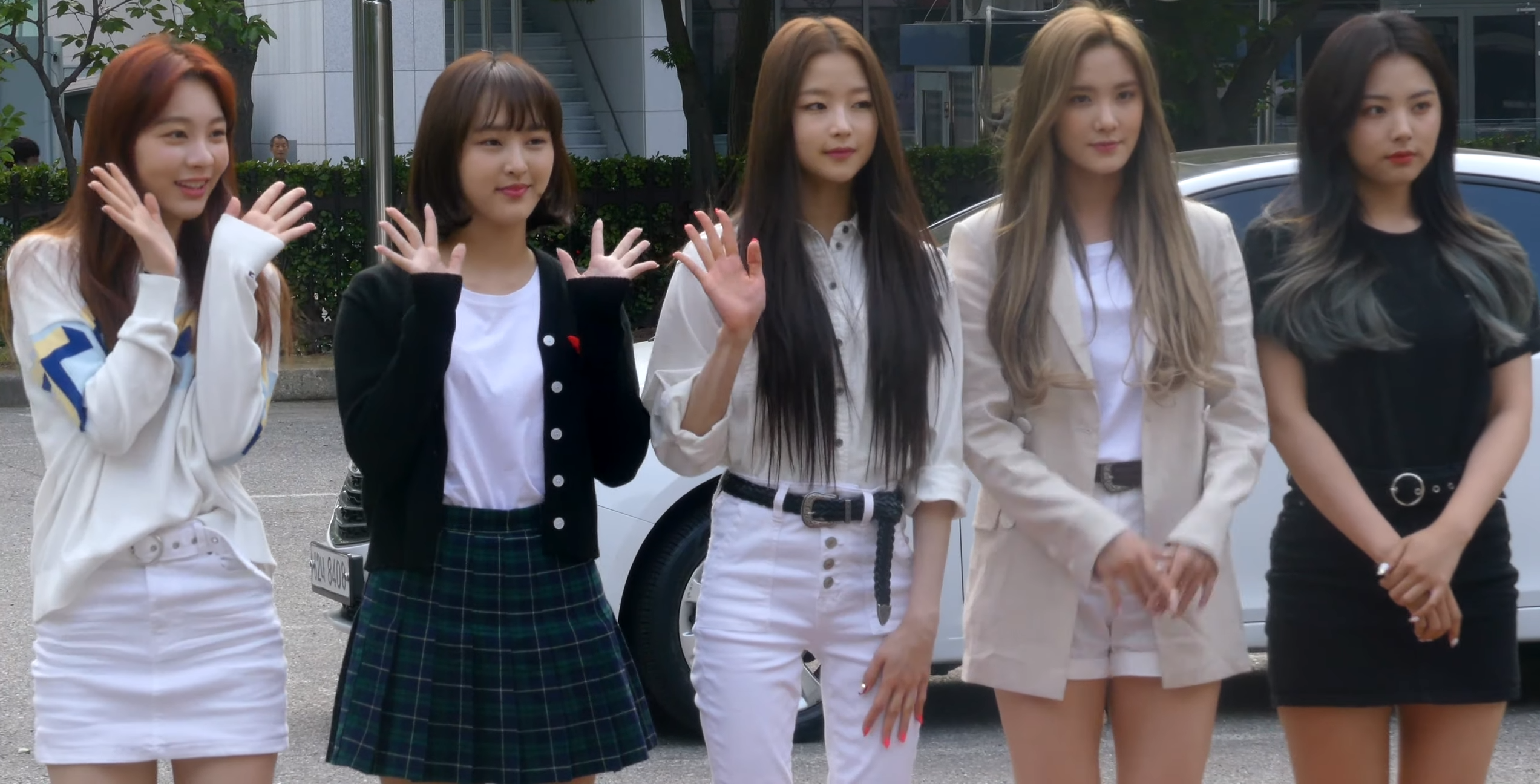
- Bvndit in May 2019; From left to right: Yiyeon, Jungwoo, Seungeun, Simyeong and Songhee

Background information
- Origin: Seoul, South Korea
- Genres: K-pop
- Years active: 2019–2022
- Labels: MNH
- Past members: Yiyeon; Songhee; Jungwoo; Simyeong; Seungeun

Bvndit (Korean: 밴디트; RR: Baenditeu; pronounced "Bandit"; acronym for Be Ambitious N Do It; stylized in all caps) was a South Korean girl group under MNH Entertainment. The group consisted of five members: Yiyeon, Songhee, Jungwoo, Simyeong, and Seungeun. They made their debut on April 10, 2019, with the single album Bvndit, Be Ambitious!, the group disbanded on November 11, 2022 as all the members terminated their exclusive contracts.

== History ==
=== 2019: Debut with Bvndit, Be Ambitious! and Be! ===
Bvndit became the first girl group ever formed by MNH Entertainment. The group made its debut on April 10 with the single "Hocus Pocus", which is the lead track for its debut digital single album Bvndit, Be Ambitious!. The single album consists of three songs, with the other two being "Be Ambitious!", serving as the introductory track, and "My Error". They made their official debut stage on April 11, 2019, on the music show M Countdown.

On May 15, Bvndit released their second digital single "Dramatic".

Bvndit released their first extended play Be! on November 5 with the lead track "Dumb".

=== 2020: Carnival ===
The group released a digital single "Cool" on February 6, 2020, as the first part of MNH Entertainment's new music project New.wav. On May 13, the group released their second EP Carnival.

=== 2021: Girls Planet 999 ===
From August to September 2021, member Seungeun appeared as a contestant on the Mnet survival show Girls Planet 999, but was eliminated in episode 5 and finished in 21st place in K-Group.

=== 2022: Re-Original and disbandment ===
After the group's third anniversary in April 2022, they announced that they will make their comeback in May. On May 3, MNH Entertainment announced Bvndit's first comeback in nearly two years, with the release of their third EP Re-Original, set to be released on May 25. On November 11, 2022, MNH announced that Bvndit has disbanded and all the members had terminated their contracts.

== Members ==
Adapted from their Naver profile.

- Yiyeon (이연) — Leader
- Songhee (송희)
- Jungwoo (정우)
- Simyeong (시명)
- Seungeun (승은)

== Discography ==
=== Extended plays ===
Title	Album details	Peak chart positions	Sales
Title	Album details	KOR	Sales
Be!	Released: November 5, 2019; Label: MNH Entertainment; Formats: CD, digital download	23	KOR: 3,242
Carnival	Released: May 13, 2020; Label: MNH Entertainment; Formats: CD, digital download	19	KOR: 4,273
Re-Original	Released: May 25, 2022; Label: MNH Entertainment; Formats: CD, digital download	32	N/A

=== Single album ===
Title	Album details
Bvndit, Be Ambitious!	Released: April 10, 2019; Label: MNH Entertainment; Formats: Digital download

=== Singles ===
List of singles, showing year released and album name
Title	Year	Peak chart positions	Album
Title	Year	KOR DL	Album
"Hocus Pocus"	2019	—	Bvndit, Be Ambitious!
"Dramatic" (드라마틱)	2019	—	Be!
"Dumb"	2019	—	Be!
"Cool"	2020	—	New.wav and Carnival
"Children"	2020	—	Carnival
"Jungle"	2020	—	Carnival
"Venom"	2022	173	Re-Original
"—" denotes releases that did not chart or were not released in that region.

== Filmography ==
=== Music videos ===
Year	Music video	Album	Director(s)	Ref.
2019	"Hocus Pocus"	Bvndit, Be Ambitious!	VISHOP (Vikings League)	
2019	"Dramatic (Performance Video)"	Be!	Unknown	—
2019	"Dumb"	Be!	Rima Yoon, Dongju Jang (Rigend Film)	
2020	"Cool"	Carnival	Keekanz	
2020	"Children"	Carnival	Keekanz	
2020	"Jungle"	Carnival	VISHOP (Vikings League)	
2022	"Venom"	Re-Original	Paradox Child	

== Awards and nominations ==
=== Genie Music Awards ===
Year	Category	Nominated work	Result	Ref.
2019	The Top Artist	—	Nominated	
2019	The Female New Artist	—	Nominated	
2019	Genie Music Popularity Award	—	Nominated	
2019	Global Popularity Award	—	Nominated	

=== Mnet Asian Music Awards ===
Year	Category	Nominated work	Result	Ref.
2019	Artist of the Year	—	Nominated	
2019	Best New Female Artist	—	Nominated	
2019	Worldwide Fans' Choice Top 10	—	Nominated	
2019	2019 Qoo10 Favorite Female Artist	—	Nominated	
