= Fake & True =

2019 single by Twice

Single by Twice

from the album &Twice
- Language: Japanese
- Released: October 18, 2019
- Genre: J-pop; synth-pop
- Length: 3:39
- Label: Warner Music Japan
- Composer: Kass
- Lyricist: Jam9

Twice singles chronology
"Feel Special" (2019)	"Fake & True" (2019)	"More & More" (2020)

Twice Japanese singles chronology
"Breakthrough" (2019)	"Fake & True" (2019)	"Fanfare" (2020)

Music video
- "Fake & True" on YouTube

"Fake & True" is a song recorded by South Korean girl group Twice. It was released by Warner Music Japan on October 18, 2019, as a digital single from their second Japanese studio album &Twice.

== Release and promotion ==
"Fake & True" was pre-released as a digital single on October 18, 2019, along with its accompanying music video, and was officially released with the album &Twice on November 19. It was first performed during the Twicelights World Tour's Japanese leg on October 23 in Sapporo. The song was also performed on a 2-hour special episode of Music Station on November 22.

== Composition ==
"Fake & True" was composed by Kass, and Jam9 wrote the lyrics. It was described as a retro-feeling synth-pop song that incorporates vibrant brass and deep house elements, and it's "meant to focus on the idea of being truthful to oneself in the pursuit of success and goals, rather than accepting the falsity of settling."

== Music video ==
On October 18, 2019, the song's music video was released on YouTube. It was directed by the production team Vikings League (Vishop).

The music video focused on the group's glamour and fashion sense, with the girls wearing high fashion outfits throughout the video. Visual effects of mirrors, virtual reality goggles, masks, glitchy realities, cameras, video screens, and a prominent lie detector were used throughout the music video to make the viewer question what is "Fake & True". Classical art and the biblical story of Adam and Eve also appeared to reinforce the theme. Mina was on hiatus due to an anxiety disorder when the music video was filmed, and she does not appear in the choreography scenes.

A new version of the "Fake & True" music video, "The Truth Game", was released on February 5, 2020, and is only available on the DVD of the &Twice repackage album. It is a re-edited version of the original video, featuring more close-up shots, lie detector scenes and fewer choreography clips.

== Charts ==
Chart performance for "Fake & True"
Chart (2019)	Peak position
Japan (Japan Hot 100)	19
