= Happy Happy =

2019 song by Twice

- Standard single cover

Single by Twice

from the album &Twice
- Language: Japanese
- B-side: "The Best Thing I Ever Did (Japanese ver.)"
- Released: July 17, 2019
- Genre: J-pop
- Length: 3:26
- Label: Warner Music Japan
- Composers: Lee Woo-min "collapsedone"; Val Del Prete; Eric Sanicola
- Lyricist: Yu Shimoji

Twice singles chronology
"Fancy" (2019)	"Happy Happy" (2019)	"Breakthrough" (2019)

Twice Japanese singles chronology
"BDZ" (2018)	"Happy Happy" (2019)	"Breakthrough" (2019)

Music video
- "Happy Happy" on YouTube

"Happy Happy" is a song recorded by South Korean girl group Twice. It is the group's fourth Japanese maxi single, featuring three other tracks. The song was pre-released digitally on June 12, 2019, and the CD single was later released on July 17 by Warner Music Japan.

== Background and release ==
On April 6, 2019, Twice announced the release of their fourth and fifth Japanese singles, titled "Happy Happy" and "Breakthrough", along with the news that Twice would appear in a television commercial for Qoo (a non-carbonated beverage from the Coca-Cola Company) on the 20th anniversary of the brand. The commercial, featuring "Happy Happy", began airing nationwide in Japan on April 8. On June 12, "Happy Happy" was pre-released as a digital single on various online music portals and the full music video was also released online on the same day. The CD single was officially released on July 17, alongside "Happy Happy Dance Making Video in Hawaii".

To commemorate the release of both new singles, the variety program Twice in Hawaii was aired on AbemaTV from July 19 to July 21. Twice members fulfilled requests from fans, who had been recruited in advance on SNS, on location in Hawaii. In mid-August, a collaboration project by Twice and Watabe Wedding was released, featuring Twice's surprise performance of "Happy Happy" at a wedding held at Ko Olina Aqua Marina Chapel in Hawaii. A special limited time collaboration, "Qoo & Twice Halloween", featuring Twice members in Halloween costumes, began airing nationwide in Japan on September 9.

== Composition ==
"Happy Happy" was composed by Collapsedone, Val Del Prete, and Eric Sanicola, with lyrics written by Yu Shimoji. Tamar Herman, writing for Billboard, said the song is "meant to represent the brightness of a summer day" and described it as "a bouncy dance track similar to many of Twice's past songs, with its euphoric choral repetition of the titular phrase and a clapping beat guiding much of the melody".

== Music video ==
The music video for the song was directed by Naive Creative Production and was released on June 11, 2019, on YouTube. It was released at the same time as the music video for "Breakthrough", Twice's fifth Japanese maxi single. Both music videos begin with a split-colored set, and the "Happy Happy" music video emphasizes brighter tones, in contrast to the darker-toned "Breakthrough". It features Twice dressed in colorful, sporty looks and backed by bright graphics as the members are seen playing around during summer days.

== Promotion ==
"Happy Happy" was first performed on a 2-hour special episode of Music Station on July 5, 2019. The single was also performed during the Japanese leg of Twicelights World Tour, which began on October 23 in Sapporo. On September 28, it was performed on NHK Shibuya Note Presents Twice Request Live, a spin-off project of the music program Shibuya Note. Twice performed live at NHK Hall with a set list based on requests from fans.

== Commercial performance ==
The CD single debuted at number 2 on the daily ranking of the Oricon Singles Chart with 114,905 units sold on its release day. It also ranked number 2 on the weekly Oricon Singles Chart with 247,032 copies sold, and debuted at number 19 with 5,653 downloads on the Oricon Digital Singles Chart. It also debuted at number 2 on the Billboard Japan Hot 100 with 302,963 unit sales and 1,586,047 streams recorded July 15–21, 2019.

== Track listing ==
CD single / digital download
No.	Title	Lyrics	Music	Arrangement	Length
1.	"Happy Happy"	Yu Shimoji	Lee Woo-min "collapsedone"; Val Del Prete; Eric Sanicola	Lee Woo-min "collapsedone"	3:26
2.	"The Best Thing I Ever Did" (Japanese version)	Natsumi Watanabe	J.Y. Park "The Asiansoul"; Park Ji-min; Jinri (Full8loom); Glory Face (영광의얼굴들) (Full8loom); Sophia Pae; Lee Woo-min "collapsedone"; Justin Reinstein	J.Y. Park "The Asiansoul"; Lee Hae-sol	3:32
3.	"Happy Happy" (collapsedone Remix)	Yu Shimoji	Lee Woo-min "collapsedone"; Val Del Prete; Eric Sanicola	Lee Woo-min "collapsedone"	3:32
4.	"Happy Happy" (Instrumental)		Lee Woo-min "collapsedone"; Val Del Prete; Eric Sanicola	Lee Woo-min "collapsedone"	3:27

First press limited edition A DVD
No.	Title	Length
1.	"Happy Happy" (Music video)
2.	"Happy Happy" (Music video making movie)

First press limited edition B DVD
No.	Title	Length
1.	"Happy Happy" (Music video Lip sync ver.)
2.	"Jacket Shooting Making Movie"

== Charts ==
=== Weekly charts ===
Weekly chart performance for "Happy Happy"
Chart (2019)	Peak position
Japan (Japan Hot 100)	2
Japan (Oricon)	2
Japan Digital Singles (Oricon)	19

=== Year-end charts ===
Year-end chart performance for "Happy Happy"
Chart (2019)	Position
Japan (Japan Hot 100)	39
Japan (Oricon)	19

== Certifications ==
Certifications for "Happy Happy"
Region	Certification	Certified units/sales
Japan (RIAJ)	Platinum	250,000^{^}
^{^} Shipments figures based on certification alone.
