= Fancy You =

2019 extended play by Twice

- Digital cover

EP by Twice
- Released: April 22, 2019
- Genres: K-pop; electropop
- Length: 18:50
- Languages: Korean; English
- Label: JYP

Twice chronology
#Twice2 (2019)	Fancy You (2019)	Feel Special (2019)

Singles from Fancy You
- 1. "Fancy" Released: April 22, 2019

Fancy You is the seventh extended play by the South Korean girl group Twice. It was released by JYP Entertainment on April 22, 2019, and features the lead single "Fancy". The group embarked on a world tour in support of the EP.

Consisting of six tracks heavily featuring pop dance and hip hop, members Momo, Jihyo, Sana, and Chaeyoung participated in the album as songwriters. Marking a change in musical concept for the group, the EP received generally favorable reviews from music critics. The EP also welcomed commercial success, holding the record for having the highest first-week sales for a Korean girl group album until it was surpassed by Twice's succeeding release, Feel Special.

== Background ==
On April 8, 2019, Twice revealed the first group teasers for their upcoming EP, announcing that it was titled Fancy You with the lead single "Fancy", which was slated for a release on April 22, 6PM KST. Simultaneously, the group also announced an upcoming world tour on the same day, with concert dates being confirmed for Seoul, Bangkok, Manila, Singapore, Los Angeles, Mexico City, Newark, Chicago, and Kuala Lumpur. On April 9, the group released individual teaser posters featuring Nayeon, Jeongyeon, and Momo. The credits for the lead single "Fancy" was also revealed, being composed by Black Eyed Pilseung and Jeon Gun. On April 10, individual teaser posters featuring Sana, Jihyo, and Mina were uploaded. A tracklist for the album was also unveiled, revealing six songs in total. On April 11, the final set of individual teaser posters featuring Dahyun, Chaeyoung, and Tzuyu were uploaded by the group. They also revealed the credits for the album's tracklist, showing that Jihyo wrote the lyrics for "Girls Like Us", Momo co-wrote lyrics for "Hot", Sana co-wrote lyrics for "Turn It Up", and Chaeyoung co-wrote lyrics for "Strawberry".

On April 12, Twice uploaded a new group teaser photo, and on the following day, a new set of individual teaser images for all nine members were released. On April 14, the group released a teaser video which featured a part of the music video set. On April 15, a "prelude" teaser video starring Jeongyeon was uploaded by the group. A third set of group teaser photos were uploaded on April 16. On April 18, Twice revealed photo cards featuring Jihyo and Chaeyoung, and a CD with a photo cover featuring Momo. On the same day, the group participated in an interview with Allure magazine detailing more about their upcoming comeback following their pictorial. On April 19, the group uploaded a choreography teaser on YouTube. They then uploaded a highlight medley for the album on April 20. On April 21, they unveiled a behind-the-scenes look at their photo shoot for the album. The final teaser for the group's upcoming music video release was uploaded on April 22, revealing the post-hook portion of "Fancy".

Fancy You and its corresponding single were officially released on April 22, 6PM KST. The group held a live showcase at the Yes24 Live Hall in Gwangjang-dong, Seoul.

== Composition ==
Fancy You consists of six tracks which heavily features the pop dance and hip hop genres. The songs featured in the album all have a common theme about boldly revealing one's romantic affections. The lead single "Fancy" is described as a "bouncing electro-pop track" that retains Twice's retro-inspired sonic base while featuring synth music. "Stuck In My Head" is classified as a hip hop track. "Girls Like Us" is a summer track which lyrically encourages women to "live out their best lives". Jihyo wrote the lyrics for "Girls Like Us" during a rough time when she was questioning whether or not she was a "good enough artist" and the lyrics are about "comforting and cheering people on when they are chasing after their dreams".

"Hot" is considered to be a pop song featuring distinct guitar riffs, lyrically describing the confidence of a woman who "everyone turns to look at her beauty and is mesmerized by her charisma." "Turn It Up" is a pop-dance track which talks about how one attempts to catch the attention of their romantic interest. The EP's closing track, "Strawberry", is described as a "soft pop" track wherein the members figuratively compare themselves to a "sweet strawberry with freckles". Chaeyoung, who co-wrote the lyrics, said the message of the song is that "you're great just as you are". She further explained, "Strawberries, like the fruit, tastes best when they're natural. When you have something that's strawberry-flavored, it’s not as good. That's how we are, too. We are the best version of ourselves when we are natural and present ourselves like we really are. When we try to be fake, or try to be something we aren't, the result isn't as great."

== Promotion ==
Twice held a live broadcast on V Live to commemorate their comeback, where they also performed the full choreography for "Fancy" for the first time. The group also promoted "Fancy" on several music programs in South Korea including M Countdown, Music Bank, Show! Music Core, Inkigayo and Show Champion, from April 25 until May 1, respectively.

Twice appeared on a two-episode special of JTBC's Idol Room on April 23 and 30. In support of their Fancy You album, the group embarked on their Twicelights World Tour beginning May 2019, visiting Seoul, Bangkok, Singapore, Los Angeles, and Manila, among other cities.

== Critical reception ==
Professional ratings
Review scores
Source	Rating
The 405	8/10
IZM	2/5 stars

Billboard magazine included Fancy You in its "25 Greatest K-Pop Albums of the 2010s: Staff List" decade-ender list, ranking at number 24. Writer Joshua Calixto described the EP as "a stylistic quantum leap from anything they’d done before, with heavier, darker undercurrents brought by producers like Charli XCX, MNEK, and K-pop superproducer Black Eyed Pilseung." He further compared the track "Strawberry" to both the attitude emulated by singer Ariana Grande and the simplicity of Selena Gomez's "Bad Liar", while also stating "Girls Like Us" and "Fancy" to be highlights. Overall, Calixto described Fancy You to be sonically different but still retaining Twice's notable features. Chase McMullen of The 405 magazine left a positive review for the album, giving it a rating of 8 out of 10 points. McMullen writes that Twice delivered an EP that is "dependable track after track", calling the album "another joyous, irresistible addition to an already impressive discography." Roxanne Wilson from The Kraze included the album in its April 2019 monthly column as Favorite Album, with Wilson praising the EP's production, stating that the "cohesive composition of the album in general makes it so that the first listen flows together perfectly."

In a more negative review, Cho Ji-hyun of IZM gave a 2 out of 5 rating for Fancy You, noting that the group's attempt to make their music style more mature was unsuccessful with the release of their EP. While he praised some aspects of song productions, Cho stated that rather than changing music styles completely, the group should have opted for a "skillful digestion" of the members' capabilities.

== Commercial performance ==
With the release of Fancy You, Twice became the first Korean girl group to surpass first week album sales of over 150,000 copies sold as recorded by Hanteo Chart, with the EP recording 151,051 copies sold in its first week. With this, Twice reached an accumulative number of 3.75 million albums sold in South Korea. Fancy You held the record for highest first-week Korean girl group album sales until it was surpassed by Twice's succeeding EP release later in 2019, Feel Special. The album also debuted at number 2 on the weekly Gaon Album Chart, while reaching a peak position atop Japan's weekly Oricon Albums Chart. Fancy You debuted at number 4 on the Billboard World Albums chart, garnering 1,000 copies sold in its first week. This was Twice's best one-week sales record in the US, and marked their ninth Top 10 entry on the World Albums chart. The album then debuted at number two on the monthly Gaon Album Chart for the month of April, recording 328,477 copies sold. In June, the album received a Platinum certification from the Korea Music Content Association for reaching sales of over 250,000 copies. The album was certified 2× Platinum in November 2022.

== Track listing ==
No.	Title	Lyrics	Music	Arrangement	Length
1.	"Fancy"	Black Eyed Pilseung; Jeon Gun	Black Eyed Pilseung; Jeon Gun	Rado	3:35
2.	"Stuck in My Head"	Lee Seu-ran	Matthew Tishler; Andrew Underberg; Philip Bentley	Tishler; Underberg	2:58
3.	"Girls Like Us"	Jihyo	Uzoechi Emenike; Dimitri Tikovoï; Maya von Doll; Charli XCX	MNEK; Tikovoï; von Doll; Charli XCX	2:40
4.	"Hot"	Momo; Kang Eun-jeong	Jonatan Gusmark & Ludvig Evers a.k.a. Moonshine; Moa "Cazzi Opeia" Carlebecker; Josefin Glenmark	Moonshine	2:59
5.	"Turn It Up"	Sana; Earattack	Earattack; Louise Frick Sveen	Earattack; Larmook	3:09
6.	"Strawberry"	Chaeyoung; Kim Eun-su	Ryan Jhun; Maestro the Baker; Jake Tench; Kloe	Ryan Jhun; Maestro the Baker; Tench	3:29
Total length:					18:50

== Personnel ==
Credits are adapted from the album's liner notes.

- Twice – vocals
  - Nayeon – background vocals (1)
- Rado – guitar, bass (1)
- Choi Hye-jin – recording (1–2, 4), mixing (2, 5)
- Tony Maserati – mixing (1)
- Kim Yeon-seo – vocal director (2), background vocals (2, 4, 6)
- Eom Se-hee – recording (2, 4–6), mixing (4)
- Kim Min-hee – recording (2–4, 6)
- Jiyoung Shin NYC – additional editing (2, 4)
- Lee Tae-seop – mixing (2–3, 5)
- Kwon Nam-woo – mastering (2–6)
- Sophia Pae – vocal director (3), background vocals (3, 5), recording (5)
- Jeong Yu-ra – additional editing (3, 5)
- Moonshine – all programming and instruments (4)
- Noday – vocal director (4)
- Im Hong-jin – mixing (4)
- Earattack – all instruments, computer programming, keyboard (5)
- Larmook – all instruments, computer programming, keyboard (5)
- Kim Jong-sung – guitar (5)
- Kim Chwa-young – bass (5)
- Jake Tench – guitar, programming (6)
- Maestro the Baker – programming, keyboard, piano (6)
- Ahn Young – digital editing (6)
- Hanif "Hitmanic" Sabzevari – mixing (6)

== Charts ==
=== Weekly charts ===
Chart (2019)	Peak position
Australian Digital Albums (ARIA)	22
French Download Albums (SNEP)	54
Japanese Albums (Oricon)	1
Japanese Digital Albums (Oricon)	2
Japanese Hot Albums (Billboard Japan)	11
South Korean Albums (Gaon)	2
Spanish Albums (PROMUSICAE)	88
UK Independent Albums (OCC)	34
US Heatseekers Albums (Billboard)	4
US Independent Albums (Billboard)	16
US World Albums (Billboard)	4

=== Year-end charts ===
Chart (2019)	Position
Japanese Albums (Oricon)	34
South Korean Albums (Gaon)	11

== Certifications ==
Region	Certification	Certified units/sales
South Korea (KMCA)	2× Platinum	500,000^{^}
^{^} Shipments figures based on certification alone.

== Accolades ==
Decade-end lists
Publication	Accolade	Rank / Year	Ref.
Billboard	The 25 Greatest K-Pop Albums of the 2010s: Staff List	24	

Awards and nominations
Year	Award	Category	Result	Ref.
2019	21st Mnet Asian Music Awards	Album of the Year	Nominated	
2020	9th Gaon Chart Music Awards	Artist of the Year – Physical Album (2nd Quarter)	Nominated	

== See also ==
- List of certified albums in South Korea
