= &Twice =

2019 studio album by Twice

- Standard edition cover

Studio album by Twice
- Released: November 20, 2019
- Genres: J-pop; EDM
- Length: 34:23
- Languages: Japanese; English
- Label: Warner Music Japan

Twice chronology
Feel Special (2019)	&Twice (2019)	More & More (2020)

Singles from &Twice
- 1. "Happy Happy" Released: June 12, 2019; 2. "Breakthrough" Released: June 12, 2019; 3. "Fake & True" Released: October 18, 2019

&Twice (Repackage)
- Standard edition (repackage) cover

&Twice (pronounced "and Twice") is the second Japanese studio album (third overall) by South Korean girl group Twice. It was released by Warner Music Japan on November 20, 2019. It features previously released singles "Happy Happy" and "Breakthrough", and the title track, "Fake & True". The group went on a tour in Japan to promote the album. A repackaged edition of the album, containing the new song "Swing", was released on February 5, 2020.

== Background and release ==
On September 6, 2019, through their website, it was announced that Twice would release their second Japanese album. The title track "Fake & True" was pre-released as a digital single on October 18, along with the accompanying music video.

A repackage was released on February 5, 2020, adding a new song titled "Swing" along with a new version of the "Fake & True" music video called "The Truth Game".

== Promotion ==
"Fake & True" was first performed during the Japanese leg of the Twicelights World Tour, which began on October 23, 2019, in Sapporo. It was also performed on a 2-hour special episode of Music Station on November 22, 2019.

== Commercial performance ==
&Twice debuted at number 1 on the daily ranking of Oricon Albums Chart with 80,563 copies sold, and topped the weekly Oricon Albums Chart with 124,197 copies sold. On Oricon Digital Album Chart, it debuted at number 5 with 1,912 download count. It also debuted atop the Billboard Japan Hot Albums chart, making it the group's third album to do so. Billboard Japan recorded 133,163 copies sold and 1,903 downloads of the album.

== Track listing ==
No.	Title	Lyrics	Music	Arrangement	Length
1.	"Fake & True"	Jam9	Kass	Kass	3:39
2.	"Stronger"	Eri Osanai	Masaki Iehara; SunHee	Masaki Iehara	3:14
3.	"Breakthrough"	Yu Shimoji	Jan Baars; Rajan Muse; Ronnie Icon	Jan Baars	3:37
4.	"Changing!"	Yu Shimoji	Secret Weapon; Red Anne; Maxx Song	Secret Weapon	3:42
5.	"Happy Happy"	Yu Shimoji	Lee Woo-min "collapsedone"; Val Del Prete; Eric Sanicola	Lee Woo-min "collapsedone"	3:26
6.	"What You Waiting For"	Mayu Wakisaka; Lee Woo-min "collapsedone"	Mayu Wakisaka; Lee Woo-min "collapsedone"	Lee Woo-min "collapsedone"	3:21
7.	"Be OK"	Shoko Fujibayashi	Benny Jansson; Ida Pihlgren	Benny Jansson	3:08
8.	"Polish"	Lauren Kaori; Yu-ki Kokubo	Julia Ross; Gannin Arnold	Gannin Arnold	3:01
9.	"How U Doin'"	Chaeyoung; Risa Horie	Frants; Chaeyoung	Frants	3:29
10.	"The Reason Why"	Natsumi Watanabe	Erik Lidbom; Fast Lane	Erik Lidbom	3:46
Total length:					34:23

&Twice — Physical album bonus tracks
No.	Title	Lyrics	Music	Arrangement	Length
11.	"Happy Happy" (collapsedone Remix)	Yu Shimoji	Lee Woo-min "collapsedone"; Val Del Prete; Eric Sanicola	Lee Woo-min "collapsedone"	3:32
12.	"Breakthrough" (taalthechoi Remix)	Yu Shimoji	Jan Baars; Rajan Muse; Ronnie Icon	Versachoi	3:22
Total length:					41:20

First press limited edition A DVD
No.	Title	Length
1.	"Twice 1st Arena Tour 2018 "BDZ" at Musashino Forest Sports Plaza"

First press limited edition B DVD
No.	Title	Length
1.	"Fake & True" (Music video)
2.	"Fake & True" (Music video making movie)
3.	"Happy Happy" (Dance Making Video in Hawaii)
4.	"Happy Happy" (Dance Practice Video in Hawaii)
5.	"Hawaii Shooting Making Movie"
6.	"Jacket Shooting Making Movie"

Repackage standard edition
No.	Title	Lyrics	Music	Arrangement	Length
1.	"Swing"	Yuka Matsumoto	Lee Woo-min "collapsedone"; Justin Reinstein	Lee Woo-min "collapsedone"; Justin Reinstein	3:22
2.	"Fake & True"	Jam9	Kass	Kass	3:39
3.	"Stronger"	Eri Osanai	Masaki Iehara; SunHee	Masaki Iehara	3:14
4.	"Breakthrough"	Yu Shimoji	Jan Baars; Rajan Muse; Ronnie Icon	Jan Baars	3:37
5.	"Changing!"	Yu Shimoji	Secret Weapon; Red Anne; Maxx Song	Secret Weapon	3:42
6.	"Happy Happy"	Yu Shimoji	Lee Woo-min "collapsedone"; Val Del Prete; Eric Sanicola	Lee Woo-min "collapsedone"	3:26
7.	"What You Waiting For"	Mayu Wakisaka; Lee Woo-min "collapsedone"	Mayu Wakisaka; Lee Woo-min "collapsedone"	Lee Woo-min "collapsedone"	3:21
8.	"Be OK"	Shoko Fujibayashi	Benny Jansson; Ida Pihlgren	Benny Jansson	3:08
9.	"Polish"	Lauren Kaori; Yu-ki Kokubo	Julia Ross; Gannin Arnold	Gannin Arnold	3:01
10.	"How U Doin'"	Chaeyoung; Risa Horie	Frants; Chaeyoung	Frants	3:29
11.	"The Reason Why"	Natsumi Watanabe	Erik Lidbom; Fast Lane	Erik Lidbom	3:46
Total length:					37:45

Repackage album bonus tracks
No.	Title	Lyrics	Music	Arrangement	Length
12.	"Happy Happy" (collapsedone Remix)	Yu Shimoji	Lee Woo-min "collapsedone"; Val Del Prete; Eric Sanicola	Lee Woo-min "collapsedone"	3:32
13.	"Breakthrough" (taalthechoi Remix)	Yu Shimoji	Jan Baars; Rajan Muse; Ronnie Icon	Versachoi	3:22
Total length:					44:40

Repackage first press limited edition DVD
No.	Title	Length
1.	"Fake & True" (Second music video "The Truth Game")
2.	"Jacket shooting making movie"
3.	"Twice 1st Arena Tour 2018 "BDZ" (Making Movie)

== Charts ==
=== Weekly charts ===
Chart (2019)	Peak position
Japan Hot Albums (Billboard)	1
Japanese Albums (Oricon)	1
Japanese Digital Albums (Oricon)	5

=== Year-end charts ===
Chart (2019)	Position
Japan Hot Albums (Billboard)	47
Japanese Albums (Oricon)	23

== Certifications ==
Region	Certification	Certified units/sales
Japan (RIAJ)	Platinum	250,000^{^}
^{^} Shipments figures based on certification alone.

== Release history ==
Release dates and formats for &Twice
Region	Date	Format(s)	Edition	Label	Ref.
Various	November 20, 2019	Digital download; streaming	Normal Edition	Warner Music Japan	
Japan	November 20, 2019	CD	Normal Edition	Warner Music Japan	
Japan	November 20, 2019	CD	Once Japan Limited Edition	Warner Music Japan	
Japan	November 20, 2019	CD + DVD	Limited Edition A	Warner Music Japan	
Japan	November 20, 2019	CD + DVD	Limited Edition B	Warner Music Japan	
Various	February 5, 2020	Digital download; streaming	Normal Edition (Repackage)	Warner Music Japan	
Japan	February 5, 2020	CD	Normal Edition (Repackage)	Warner Music Japan	
Japan	February 5, 2020	CD + DVD	Limited Edition (Repackage)	Warner Music Japan	
Japan	December 6, 2023	Vinyl	Limited Edition	Warner Music Japan	
