= Feel Special (song) =

2019 single by Twice

Single by Twice

from the EP Feel Special
- Language: Korean
- Released: September 23, 2019
- Recorded: JYP Studio; Vibe Studio
- Genre: Miami bass; house; pop; synth-pop
- Length: 3:27
- Label: JYP
- Composers: Hayley Aitken; J.Y. Park "The Asiansoul"; Min Lee "Collapsedone"; Ollipop
- Lyricist: J.Y. Park "The Asiansoul"

Twice singles chronology
"Breakthrough" (2019)	"Feel Special" (2019)	"Fake & True" (2019)

Music video
- "Feel Special" on YouTube

Audio sample
- file; help

"Feel Special" is a song recorded by South Korean girl group Twice. It serves as the lead single of the group's eighth EP Feel Special, released through JYP Entertainment on September 23, 2019, along with its music video. It was composed by Hayley Aitken, Min Lee "Collapsedone", Ollipop and Park Jin-young, the latter of whom also wrote the lyrics.

"Feel Special" was an instant hit, debuting at number one on both the Billboard Kpop Hot 100 and World Digital Song Sales. It also debuted in the top ten on South Korea's Gaon Digital Chart, New Zealand's Hot Singles and Japan's Hot 100. The song won seven trophies on several music programs in South Korea, including Inkigayo, M Countdown, and Show! Music Core. In April 2023, the song was certified 2× Platinum by the Recording Industry Association of Japan for surpassing 200 million streams.

== Background ==
Prior to the EP's release, the group released teasers on social media for the "Feel Special" music video, including individual clips for each member. On September 10, 2019, the day that Momo's clip was released, her name trended ahead of the Apple event on Twitter. Dahyun released a piano cover of the song on May 28, 2020, her 22nd birthday. She also performed vocals in the cover, however, she did not perform her rap part and instead played a piano solo. A Japanese version of "Feel Special" was included in the group's third Japanese language compilation album #Twice3, released on September 16, 2020.

== Music and lyrics ==
Due to our showbiz career, obviously there have been times when we found hectic schedules and the following outcomes challenging. But we were able to overcome all that thanks to the support from caring people around us, including the members and our fans. And that's what "Feel Special" is about. There are people around us who help us stand on our own two feet. [...] I hope more people will realize that there are helping hands around us and find comfort with our song.

— Nayeon on "Feel Special"

"Feel Special" is a pop, synth-pop, miami bass and house song written in the A-flat major key. Billboard's Tamar Herman described the song as "a vibrant, uplifting track", writing that the song "[opens] with quirky synths and [leads] into a groovy bass beat", slowly transitioning into "atmospheric verses and perky raps" and eventually enters "the boisterous, impactful chorus".

The lyrics of the song, written by Park Jin-young, were based on a conversation he had with members of Twice during dinner, in which they expressed the emotions they felt while dealing with the pressures of fame throughout the four years since their debut in 2015. In an interview with CNN Brazil, Park revealed more about what inspired the lyrics: "Back then, Sana was going through some struggle, and I was watching how the other members were supporting her, and it just touched my heart and I wrote the song for their friendship." Nayeon said Park expressed the members' feelings in the lyrics, and she called it one of the group's most memorable tracks. Members have regarded the song as being sincere and relatable with its personal and truthful lyrics. The key message of the song is "the shift from feeling insignificant to finding purpose".

In an interview with PopCrush, Chaeyoung said that the lyrics are meant to inspire fans to realize that they are not alone and appreciate the precious people around them during difficult times. Jeongyeon wants the song to serve as a motivation at times when people feel tired as life gets busy. Tzuyu said that the song "holds very true and sentimental lyrics" to their fans and the public, and noted that songs become tougher to perform as they get more relatable. She hopes that their fans can "find comfort in this song, and realize that they are not alone and it is awesome to love yourself". Mina has a solo verse in this song after the first chorus, towards the middle of the song. Kat Moon of Time pointed out that "the part she recorded for 'Feel Special' seems to echo the statements about her emotions toward performing". Dahyun stressed that the part after Mina's verse is the most important, which describes the sliver of hope appearing, and the progression "from nobody to somebody".

== Critical reception ==
Jeff Benjamin of the South China Morning Post included "Feel Special" in his "10 Best K-pop songs of 2019", ranking at number three and describing the song as a "stunning, synth-driven single that not only continued Twice’s string of pristine chart-toppers, but also had a deeper message about taking care of yourself." Kim Do-heon of IZM gave a mixed review for the song, calling its production "stylish but outdated", and noted that while the single successfully aimed for a more mature image, its "completeness and method of expression are the lowest among Twice's discography." Nevertheless, he stated that the entirety of Feel Special as a whole is worth listening due to "the well-placed urban and chic electropop [sound] under the lonely and calm atmosphere created by the title track."

== Commercial performance ==
"Feel Special" reached the top of both Billboard's Kpop Hot 100 and World Digital Song Sales. It also peaked at number 4 on Billboard's Japan Hot 100, number 8 on RMNZ Hot Singles, number 9 on Gaon Digital Chart, and number 13 on Oricon Digital Singles. The song also marks the group's first entry to Billboard's Canadian Hot 100, debuting at number 82. In May 2020, "Feel Special" received Silver streaming certification from the Recording Industry Association of Japan (RIAJ) for surpassing 30 million streams. In March 2021, the song was certified Platinum for surpassing 100 million streams. In April 2023, "Feel Special" became Twice's first song to be certified 2× Platinum by the RIAJ for surpassing 200 million streams.

== Music video and promotion ==
The music video was released at 6 pm KST on September 23, 2019. It was watched more than 11 million times on YouTube in less than 16 hours after its release. In the video, members of the group are dressed up in unique looks to showcase their individual personalities and distinct roles in the group. Eight members of the group formed four pairs. In each pair, we see the members reach out to one another. Chaeyoung, who is inside a white dome, meets Mina as she approaches the dome and it turns transparent. Momo encounters Tzuyu, who is a goddess doll residing in a dollhouse. Nayeon, whose face is displayed on numerous TV screens, offers a smile of support to Jihyo. Dahyun, carrying an umbrella featuring Twice's colors, reaches out to Sana, who is sitting alone and soaked by the rain. Jeongyeon, not paired with any member, is seen feeling alone initially until she envisions herself joining other members of the group, enjoying herself and having fun. In March 2024, the music video achieved 500 million views.

Twice promoted "Feel Special" on several music programs in South Korea, including Inkigayo, M Countdown, and Show! Music Core, from late-September to the middle of October. Mina did not participate, as she was on hiatus due to an anxiety disorder at the time. The group collected a total of seven wins for "Feel Special" throughout the course of its promotion. They also performed the song live during the Japanese leg of the Twicelights World Tour (2019–2020), with the first performance as a full group taking place in Fukuoka on February 11, 2020.

=== Accolades ===
Music program awards for "Feel Special"
Program	Date	Ref.
Show Champion	October 2, 2019	
Show Champion	October 9, 2019	
M Countdown	October 3, 2019	
M Countdown	October 10, 2019	
Music Bank	October 4, 2019	
Inkigayo	October 6, 2019	
Inkigayo	October 13, 2019	

== Usage in media ==
"Feel Special" was included in the Ubisoft dance rhythm game Just Dance 2021, which was released on November 12, 2020. On December 12, Joysound revealed the single to be the most popular K-pop song in Japanese karaoke for the year 2020, topping the "2020 Joysound Annual Ranking" list, and Twice having the most entries in the Top 20 with 4 songs. Joysound stated that Karaoke song rankings are an indicator to the kind of songs enjoyed by the Japanese general public, as opposed to album sales where fandom influence is inevitable.

== Credits and personnel ==
Credits adapted from Melon.

Studios

- JYP Studio – recording
- Vibe Studio – recording
- Mirrorball Studio – mixing
- Honey Butter Studio – mastering

Song credits

- Twice – vocals
- Yeonseo Kim – background vocals
- Eunji Shim – vocal director
- Park Jin-young – executive producer, lyricist, composition
- Hayley Aitken – composition
- Ollipop – composition
- Min Lee "Collapsedone" – composition, arrangement, all instruments, guitar, synth, programming
- Hyejin Choi – recording
- Saehee Um – recording
- Sangyeop Lee – recording
- Minjeong Woo – recording
- Tony Maserati – mixing
- James Krausse – mixing engineer
- David Kim – assistant mixing engineer
- Jeongeon Park – mastering

== Charts ==
=== Weekly charts ===
Weekly chart performance
Chart (2019)	Peak position
Canada (Canadian Hot 100)	82
Global Excl. US (Billboard)	190
Japan (Japan Hot 100)	4
Japan Digital Singles (Oricon)	13
New Zealand Hot Singles (RMNZ)	8
Singapore (RIAS)	3
South Korea (Gaon)	9
South Korea (Kpop Hot 100)	1
US World Digital Song Sales (Billboard)	1

=== Monthly charts ===
Monthly chart performance
Chart (2019)	Position
South Korea (Gaon)	14

=== Year-end charts ===
2019 year-end chart performance for "Feel Special"
Chart (2019)	Position
South Korea (Gaon)	126

2020 year-end chart performance for "Feel Special"
Chart (2020)	Position
South Korea (Gaon)	142

== Certifications ==
Certifications for "Feel Special"
Region	Certification	Certified units/sales
New Zealand (RMNZ)	Gold	15,000^{‡}
Streaming
Japan (RIAJ)	3× Platinum	300,000,000^{†}
^{‡} Sales+streaming figures based on certification alone.^{†} Streaming-only figures based on certification alone.

== See also ==
- List of Inkigayo Chart winners (2019)
- List of K-pop Hot 100 number ones
- List of M Countdown Chart winners (2019)
- List of Music Bank Chart winners (2019)
