= Fancy (Twice song) =

Single by Twice

from the EP Fancy You
- Language: Korean
- Released: April 22, 2019
- Genre: Electropop
- Length: 3:34
- Label: JYP
- Songwriters: Black Eyed Pilseung; Jeon Goon

Twice singles chronology
"The Best Thing I Ever Did" (2018)	"Fancy" (2019)	"Happy Happy" (2019)

Music video
- "Fancy" on YouTube

"Fancy" (stylized in all caps) is a song by South Korean girl group Twice. It was released by JYP Entertainment on April 22, 2019, as the lead single from the group's seventh extended play, Fancy You. Written by Black Eyed Pilseung and Jeon Goon, "Fancy" is a retro-inspired electropop track. The accompanying music video represented a stylistic shift in a more mature direction compared to Twice's previous releases.

The song was a commercial success in both South Korea and Japan. It peaked at number 3 on the Gaon Digital Chart and number 4 on the Billboard Japan Hot 100, and was certified platinum for streaming in both countries. It won trophies on three music programs in South Korea, and won the MAMA Award for Best Dance Performance at the 2019 Mnet Asian Music Awards.

== Background and composition ==
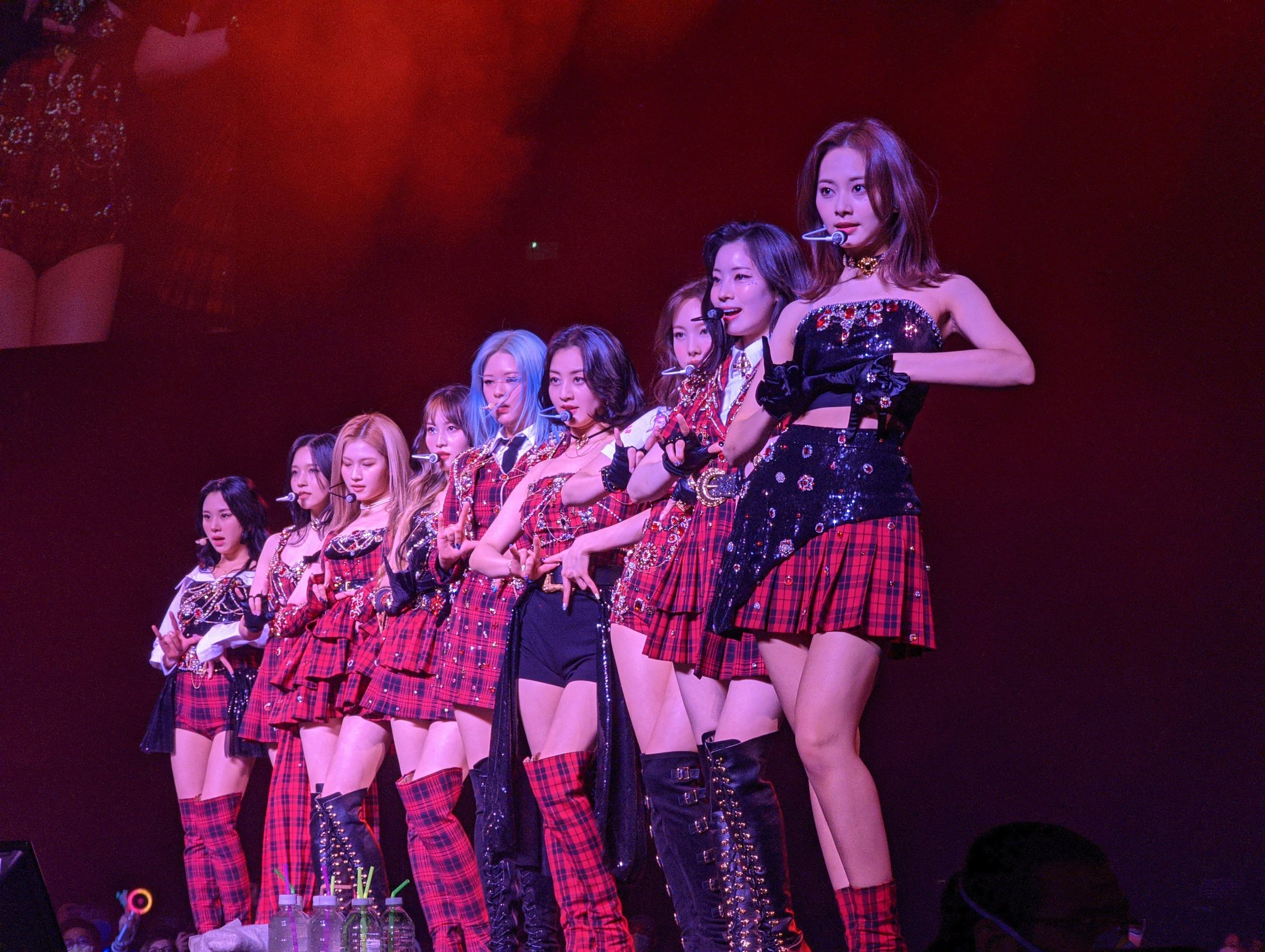
Twice performing "Fancy" at The Forum in Inglewood, California on February 15, 2022

"Fancy" was co-written by Black Eyed Pilseung, who wrote Twice's previous singles "Like Ooh-Ahh", "Cheer Up", "TT", and "Likey". The songwriting duo, which consists of Rado and Choi Kyu-sung, are credited alongside Jeon Goon. Hong Dam-young of The Korea Herald, reporting from the press showcase, described "Fancy" as a "dramatic and dynamic song that features Twice in a totally new light". Hong continued, "While keeping the group's previous quirky festive tone that has defined a majority of its hits, 'Fancy' blends mellow mood pop electro beats with the members' sophisticated, strong melodies. Singing about love, the bandmates boldly express their emotions with lines like 'I won't ever let you go' and 'It doesn't matter who liked who first'".

Tamar Herman from Billboard described the song as a "bouncing electro-pop track that keeps the group's quintessentially retro-inspired, addicting sound while turning to a bit of a bolder styling that revels in dynamic synths and playful digital quirks". According to Herman, "The group's vocals take on a bit more of a mature, sultry tone during the verses, but Twice maintains their exuberant, upbeat energy for the song's chorus."

== Reception ==
"Fancy" debuted at number 3 on both the Gaon Digital Chart and K-pop Hot 100. It also peaked at number 4 on Billboard's World Digital Song Sales chart and the Billboard Japan Hot 100, number 8 on the Oricon Digital Singles chart, and number 17 on RMNZ Hot Singles. In May 2021, "Fancy" surpassed 100 million streams and was certified Platinum by the Korea Music Content Association. When the Recording Industry Association of Japan introduced streaming certifications in April 2020, "Fancy" was certified Silver for surpassing 30 million streams. The song was subsequently certified Gold in September 2020, Platinum in February 2022, and 2× Platinum in April 2026. The song ranked at number 5 on Dazed's 20 Best K-pop Songs of 2019. Billboard also included "Fancy" in their best K-pop songs of the 2010s list.

"Fancy" on critic lists and polls
Critic/Publication	List	Rank	Ref.
Billboard	The 25 Best K-pop Songs of 2019	14	
Billboard	The 100 Greatest K-Pop Songs of the 2010s	93	
Bugs!	2019 Year End Top 100	21	
BuzzFeed	Best K-pop Music Videos of 2019	4	
Dazed	The 20 best K-pop songs of 2019	5	
Gallup Korea	The Best Songs in 2019	6	
Refinery29	The Best K-Pop Songs Of 2019	7	

== Music video and promotion ==
The music video of "Fancy", directed by Kim Young-jo and Yoo Seung-woo of Naive, was uploaded online on April 22, 2019. The music video was ranked third place on 2019 YouTube's Most Popular Music Video in South Korea. It also ranked at No. 10 on 2019 YouTube's Top Trend Music Video in Japan.

The "Fancy" music video is more mature and sophisticated compared to Twice's previous music videos. It features vivid CGI backdrops, with the members alternating between stylish black and colorful outfits. The song's powerful choreography was choreographed by Bock Mi-ran, Kang Da-sol, Kiel Tutin, and Leejung Lee.

Twice held a live broadcast on V Live to commemorate their comeback, where they also performed the full choreography of the song for the first time. The group also promoted "Fancy" on several music programs in South Korea including M Countdown, Music Bank, Show! Music Core, Inkigayo and Show Champion, on April 25, 26, 27, 28, and May 1, respectively.

== Japanese version ==
The Japanese version of "Fancy" was released on July 24, 2019, as a B-side of Twice's 5th maxi single, "Breakthrough"'. The Japanese lyrics were written by Eri Osanai as well as Black Eyed Pilseung and Jeon Goon, who also wrote the original Korean lyrics.

== Accolades ==
Awards and nominations for "Fancy"
Year	Award ceremony	Category	Result	Ref.
2019	11th Melon Music Awards	Best Dance – Female	Nominated	
2019	21st Mnet Asian Music Awards	Song of the Year	Nominated	
2019	21st Mnet Asian Music Awards	Best Dance Performance – Female Group	Won	
2020	9th Gaon Chart Music Awards	Artist of the Year – Digital Music (April)	Nominated	

Music program awards for "Fancy"
Program	Date	Ref.
Show Champion	May 1, 2019	
M Countdown	May 2, 2019	
Inkigayo	May 5, 2019	

== Charts ==
=== Weekly charts ===
Weekly chart performance
Chart (2019)	Peak position
Japan (Japan Hot 100)	4
Japan Digital Singles (Oricon)	8
Malaysia (RIM)	5
New Zealand Hot Singles (RMNZ)	17
South Korea (Gaon)	3
South Korea (Kpop Hot 100)	3
US World Digital Song Sales (Billboard)	4

=== Monthly charts ===
Monthly chart performance
Chart (2019)	Position
South Korea (Gaon)	4

=== Year-end charts ===
2019 year-end chart performance for "Fancy"
Chart (2019)	Position
Japan (Japan Hot 100)	34
South Korea (Gaon)	29

2020 year-end chart performance for "Fancy"
Chart (2020)	Position
South Korea (Gaon)	191

== Certifications ==
Certifications
Region	Certification	Certified units/sales
Brazil (Pro-Música Brasil)	Gold	20,000^{‡}
New Zealand (RMNZ)	Gold	15,000^{‡}
Streaming
Japan (RIAJ)	2× Platinum	200,000,000^{†}
South Korea (KMCA)	Platinum	100,000,000^{†}
^{‡} Sales+streaming figures based on certification alone.^{†} Streaming-only figures based on certification alone.

== See also ==
- List of Inkigayo Chart winners (2019)
- List of M Countdown Chart winners (2019)
