= Breakthrough (Twice song) =

2019 song by Twice

- Standard single cover

Single by Twice

from the album &Twice
- Language: Japanese
- B-side: "Fancy (Japanese ver.)"
- Released: July 24, 2019
- Genre: J-pop; electropop
- Length: 3:38
- Label: Warner Music Japan
- Composers: Jan Baars; Ronnie Icon; Rajan Muse
- Lyricist: Yu Shimoji

Twice singles chronology
"Happy Happy" (2019)	"Breakthrough" (2019)	"Feel Special" (2019)

Twice Japanese singles chronology
"Happy Happy" (2019)	"Breakthrough" (2019)	"Fake & True" (2019)

Music video
- "Breakthrough" on YouTube

"Breakthrough" is a song recorded by South Korean girl group Twice. It is the group's fifth Japanese maxi single, featuring three other tracks. The song was pre-released digitally on June 12, 2019, and the CD single was later released on July 24 by Warner Music Japan.

== Background and release ==
On April 6, 2019, Twice announced the release of their fourth and fifth Japanese singles, titled "Happy Happy" and "Breakthrough". On June 12, "Breakthrough" was pre-released as a digital single on various online music portals and the full music video was also released online on the same day. The single physically released on July 24, along with the news that Twice would appear in a commercial for cosmetic brand Aube, featuring "Breakthrough" as the commercial song. To commemorate the release of both new singles, the variety program Twice in Hawaii was aired on AbemaTV on July 19–21. Twice members fulfilled requests from fans, who had been recruited in advance on SNS, on location in Hawaii.

== Composition ==
"Breakthrough" was composed by Jan Baars, Rajan Muse, and Ronnie Icon, with lyrics written by Yu Shimoji. Tamar Herman, writing for Billboard, said the song is "meant to evoke the feelings of a cool summer night" and "offers up a dramatic, brassier electro-pop sound that puts the nonet's silky smooth vocals front and center".

== Music video ==
The music video for the song was directed by Naive Creative Production and was released on June 11, 2019, on YouTube. The music video begins with the same split-colored set as "Happy Happy" and features neon signs with the titles of both singles. "Breakthrough" features darker tones (in contrast to the brighter-toned "Happy Happy"), and the group is seen dancing at night in "sensual black outfits" and "imposing white power suits". By May 2021, the video had received over 100 million views on YouTube, earning Twice a record for having "the most music videos with more than 100 million views on YouTube among girl groups in the world".

== Promotion ==
On July 5, 2019, Twice performed "Breakthrough" for the first time on a 2-hour special episode of Music Station. It was also performed during the Japanese leg of Twicelights World Tour, which began on October 23 in Sapporo. On September 28, they performed "Breakthrough" on NHK Shibuya Note Presents Twice Request Live, a spin-off project of the music program Shibuya Note.

== Commercial performance ==
The CD single debuted at number 2 on the daily ranking of the Oricon Singles Chart with 128,525 units sold on its release day. It also ranked number 2 on the weekly Oricon Singles Chart with 229,326 copies sold. It topped the Billboard Japan Hot 100 with 288,502 copies sold, 3,451 downloads, and 2,213,588 streams recorded from July 22–28, 2019.

== Track listing ==
Digital download EP
No.	Title	Lyrics	Music	Arrangement	Length
1.	"Breakthrough"	Yu Shimoji	Jan Baars; Rajan Muse; Ronnie Icon	Jan Baars	3:37
2.	"Fancy" (Japanese version)	Eri Osanai	Black Eyed Pilseung; Jeon Gun	Rado	3:36
3.	"Breakthrough" (taalthechoi Remix)	Yu Shimoji	Jan Baars; Rajan Muse; Ronnie Icon	Versachoi	3:22
4.	"Breakthrough" (Instrumental)		Jan Baars; Rajan Muse; Ronnie Icon	Jan Baars	3:37
Total length:					13:32

First press limited edition A DVD
No.	Title	Length
1.	"Breakthrough" (Music video)
2.	"Breakthrough" (Music video making movie)

First press limited edition B DVD
No.	Title	Length
1.	"Breakthrough" (Music video Lip sync ver.)
2.	"Jacket Shooting Making Movie"

== Korean version ==
The Korean version of "Breakthrough" was released on September 23, 2019, as the seventh track of Twice's eighth extended play (EP) Feel Special as a special gift for fans. The Korean lyrics were written by Olivia Choi.

== Charts ==
=== Weekly charts ===
Weekly chart performance for "Breakthrough"
Chart (2019)	Peak position
Japan (Japan Hot 100)	1
Japan (Oricon)	2
South Korea (Kpop Hot 100)	99 (Note: Peak chart position of "Breakthrough (Korean ver.)" on Billboard Korea K-Pop 100.)
US World Digital Song Sales (Billboard)	11 (Note: Peak chart position of "Breakthrough (Korean ver.)" on World Digital Song Sales Chart)

=== Year-end charts ===
Year-end chart performance for "Breakthrough"
Chart (2019)	Position
Japan (Japan Hot 100)	28
Japan (Oricon)	17

== Certifications ==
Certifications for "Breakthrough"
Region	Certification	Certified units/sales
Japan (RIAJ)	Platinum	250,000^{^}
Streaming
Japan (RIAJ)	Gold	50,000,000^{†}
^{^} Shipments figures based on certification alone.^{†} Streaming-only figures based on certification alone.

== Release history ==
Release history and formats for "Breakthrough"
Region	Date	Version	Format	Label	Ref.
Various	July 24, 2019	Japanese	Digital download, streaming	JYP Entertainment, Warner Music Japan	
Japan	July 24, 2019	Japanese	CD Single	JYP Entertainment, Warner Music Japan	
Various	September 23, 2019	Korean	Digital download, streaming	JYP Entertainment	
