= Twicelights World Tour =

2019–20 concert tour by Twice

- World tour by Twice
- Associated album: Fancy You
- Start date: May 25, 2019
- End date: February 23, 2020
- Legs: 3
- No. of shows: 21 in Asia; 4 in North America; 25 in total

Twice concert chronology
- #Dreamday Dome Tour (2019); Twicelights World Tour (2019–20); Twice: World in a Day (2020)

The Twicelights World Tour was the first world tour by South Korean girl group Twice. The tour began in Seoul, South Korea on May 25, 2019, and concluded in Shizuoka, Japan on February 23, 2020, with 25 concerts held in 16 cities across Asia and North America. Four encore shows in Seoul and Tokyo that were originally scheduled for early 2020 were cancelled following the outbreak of the COVID-19 pandemic.

== Background ==
On April 8, 2019, JYP Entertainment announced that Twice would hold their first world tour in nine cities including Seoul, Bangkok, Manila, Los Angeles, and Chicago starting from May 25. On July 17, seven cities in Japan including Hokkaido, Chiba, and Osaka were adding to the tour schedule. Member Mina was unable to participate in the Singapore, North American, and Kuala Lumpur concerts as she was struggling with "extreme anxiety" at the time.

On October 18, it was announced that Twice would hold additional concerts in Tokyo on March 3 and 4, 2020; additional concerts in Seoul for March 7 and 8 were added a month later. However, on February 24, 2020, JYP Entertainment announced that the final shows in Seoul had been cancelled due to the impact of the COVID-19 pandemic in South Korea; this was followed by the announcement of the cancellation of the Tokyo shows two days later.

== Set lists ==
Set list in Seoul

Main Set

1. Stuck in My Head (Rock remix)
2. Cheer Up (Rock remix)
3. Touchdown (Rock remix)
4. BDZ (Korean version)
5. Yes or Yes (remix)
6. Like Ooh-Ahh (Ooh-Ahh하게) (remix)
7. I Want You Back (remix)
8. Knock Knock (remix)
9. Dance The Night Away (Dance intro version)
10. After Moon
11. You in My Heart (널 내게 담아)
12. Be as One (Korean version)
13. Sunset
14. Heart Shaker (Ballad remix)
15. Heart Shaker (remix)
16. Strawberry
17. Woohoo (remix)
18. Dance for You (Beyoncé cover) (Sana, Dahyun & Tzuyu)
19. Goodbye (Taemin cover) (Momo & Jihyo)
20. Born This Way (Lady Gaga cover) (Nayeon, Jeongyeon, Mina & Chaeyoung)
21. Likey
22. What Is Love?
23. Ho!
24. Signal
25. TT
26. Fancy (remix)

Encore

1. Heart Shaker
2. Title track medley
3. Stuck
Set list in Japan

Main Set

1. Stuck in My Head (Rock remix)
2. Touchdown (Rock remix)
3. BDZ
4. Yes or Yes (remix)
5. I Want You Back (remix)
6. Dance The Night Away (Dance intro version)
7. Breakthrough
8. The Reason Why
9. Wishing
10. What You Waiting For
11. Heart Shaker (Ballad remix)
12. Heart Shaker (remix)
13. Strawberry
14. Woohoo (remix)
15. Dance for You (Beyoncé cover) (Sana, Dahyun & Tzuyu)
16. Goodbye (Taemin cover) (Momo & Jihyo)
17. Born This Way (Lady Gaga cover) (Nayeon, Jeongyeon, Mina & Chaeyoung)
18. Likey
19. What Is Love?
20. Feel Special
21. TT
22. Fancy (remix)
23. Fake & True

Encore

1. Happy Happy

(Japanese Title Track Medley)

1. One More Time
2. Candy Pop
3. Wake Me Up
4. Stay by My Side
Set list in Singapore, USA & Kuala Lumpur

Main Set

1. Stuck in My Head (Rock remix)
2. Cheer Up (Rock remix)
3. Touchdown (Rock remix)
4. BDZ
5. Yes or Yes (remix)
6. I Want You Back (remix)
7. Dance The Night Away (Dance intro version)
8. After Moon
9. You in My Heart
10. Sunset
11. Heart Shaker (Ballad remix)
12. Heart Shaker (remix)
13. Strawberry
14. Woohoo (remix)
15. Dance for You (Beyoncé cover) (Sana, Dahyun & Tzuyu)
16. Goodbye (Taemin cover) (Momo & Jihyo)
17. Born This Way (Lady Gaga cover) (Nayeon, Jeongyeon & Chaeyoung)
18. Likey
19. What Is Love?
20. Like Ooh-Ahh
21. TT
22. Fancy (remix)

Encore

1. Signal
2. Knock Knock
3. Stuck
Notes
- During the show in Bangkok and Manila, "Like OOH-AHH" (Ooh-Ahh하게) was removed after "Yes or Yes". Twice also removed "Be as One" (Korean version) after Ment 2. They also removed "Ho!" and "Signal" and performed "Like OOH-AHH" (Ooh-Ahh하게) instead after Ment 3. For the Encore in Bangkok and Manila they removed "Heart Shaker" and performed "Knock Knock" instead.
- During the show in Bangkok, Twice removed from the encore "Medley" and they performed "Signal" (remix) instead after the ending ment.
- Mina didn't participate in the Singapore, USA, Mexico & Malaysia dates due to health issues.
- Chaeyoung didn't participate in the Sapporo concert or the final Nagoya concert due to health issues.

== Tour dates ==
List of concert dates
Date	City	Country	Venue	Attendance
May 25, 2019	Seoul	South Korea	KSPO Dome	20,000
May 26, 2019	Seoul	South Korea	KSPO Dome	20,000
June 15, 2019	Bangkok	Thailand	Impact Arena	8,000
June 29, 2019	Manila	Philippines	Mall of Asia Arena	10,000
July 13, 2019	Singapore		Singapore Indoor Stadium	10,000
July 17, 2019	Inglewood	United States	The Forum	11,827
July 19, 2019	Mexico City	Mexico	Palacio de los Deportes	8,000
July 21, 2019	Newark	United States	Prudential Center	10,000
July 23, 2019	Chicago	United States	Wintrust Arena	5,911
August 17, 2019	Kuala Lumpur	Malaysia	Axiata Arena	8,000
October 23, 2019	Sapporo	Japan	Makomanai Sekisui Heim Ice Arena	—N/a
October 27, 2019	Chiba	Japan	Makuhari Messe	—N/a
October 29, 2019	Chiba	Japan	Makuhari Messe	—N/a
October 30, 2019	Chiba	Japan	Makuhari Messe	—N/a
November 6, 2019	Osaka	Japan	Osaka-jō Hall	—N/a
November 7, 2019	Osaka	Japan	Osaka-jō Hall	—N/a
November 16, 2019	Miyagi	Japan	Sekisui Heim Super Arena	—N/a
November 17, 2019	Miyagi	Japan	Sekisui Heim Super Arena	—N/a
November 29, 2019	Nagoya	Japan	Nagoya International Exhibition Hall	—N/a
November 30, 2019	Nagoya	Japan	Nagoya International Exhibition Hall	—N/a
December 1, 2019	Nagoya	Japan	Nagoya International Exhibition Hall	—N/a
February 11, 2020	Fukuoka	Japan	Marine Messe Fukuoka	—N/a
February 12, 2020	Fukuoka	Japan	Marine Messe Fukuoka	—N/a
February 22, 2020	Shizuoka	Japan	Ecopa Arena	—N/a
February 23, 2020	Shizuoka	Japan	Ecopa Arena	—N/a
Total				N/A

=== Cancelled dates ===
List of cancelled concerts, showing date, city, country, venue and reason for cancellation
Date	City	Country	Venue	Reason
March 7, 2020	Seoul	South Korea	KSPO Dome	COVID-19 pandemic
March 8, 2020	Seoul	South Korea	KSPO Dome	COVID-19 pandemic
April 15, 2020 (March 3, 2020)	Tokyo	Japan	Tokyo Dome	COVID-19 pandemic
April 16, 2020 (March 4, 2020)	Tokyo	Japan	Tokyo Dome	COVID-19 pandemic

=== Boxscore ===
List of shows with boxscore data
Date	City	Tickets Sold / Available	Gross Revenue
July 17, 2019	Inglewood, California	11,827 / 11,827 (100%)	$1,388,228
July 23, 2019	Chicago, Illinois	5,911 / 6,045 (97.7%)	$781,922

== See also ==
- List of Twice concert tours
