= Gwangjang-dong =

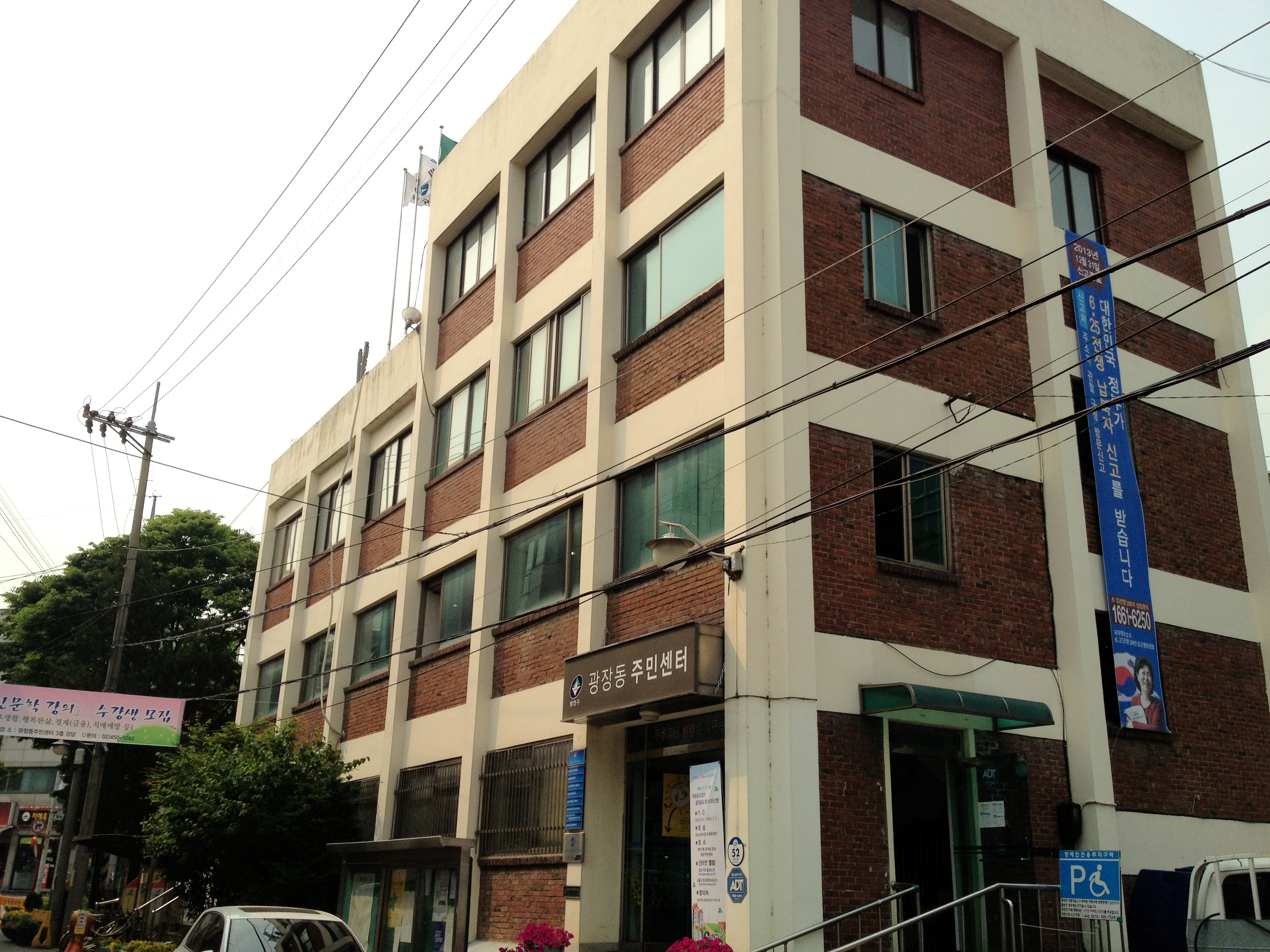
- Gwangjin Gwangjang-dong Community Service Center
- Interactive map of Gwangjang-dong
- Country: South Korea

Area
  - Total: 2.36 km^{2} (0.91 sq mi)

Population (2001)
  - Total: 34,179
  - Density: 14,500/km^{2} (37,500/sq mi)

Korean name
- Hangul: 광장동
- Hanja: 廣壯洞
- RR: Gwangjang-dong
- MR: Kwangjang-dong

Gwangjang-dong (Korean: 광장동) is a dong (neighborhood) of Gwangjin District, Seoul, South Korea.

== Name origin ==
The name Gwangjang-dong was derived from the character "광" in Gwangjin-ri, a natural village from the Joseon period, and the character "장" in Jangui-dong.

== Attractions ==
- AX Hall
- Sheraton Walkerhill Hotel
- Achasan
- Hangang
- Gwangjin Library

== See also ==
- Administrative divisions of South Korea
