= TripleS discography =

South Korean girl group discography

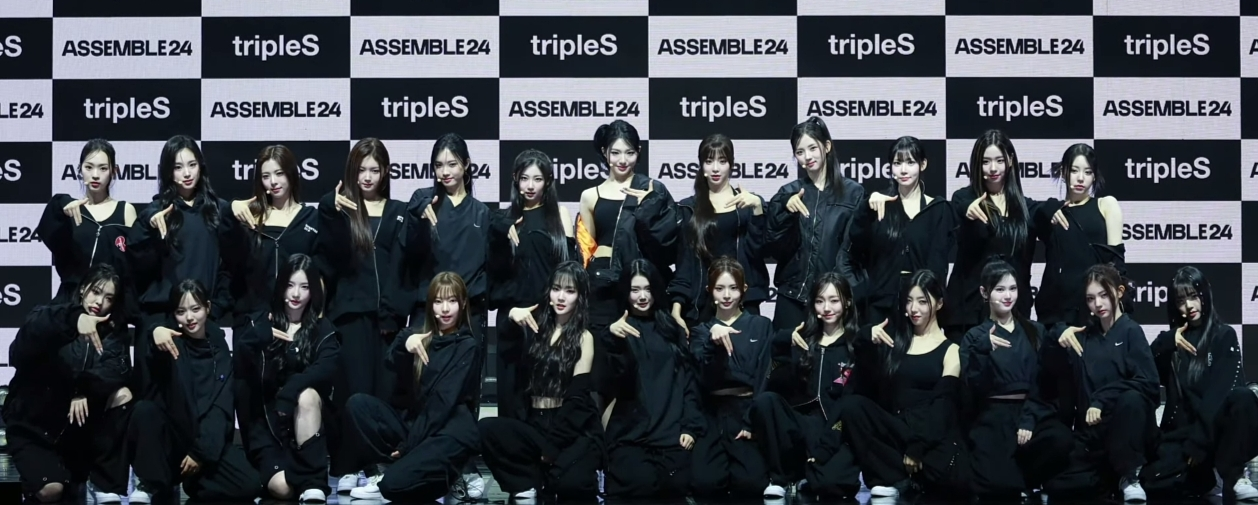
- TripleS in 2024
- Studio albums: 3
- EPs: 8
- Single albums: 2
- Compilation albums: 3
- Singles: 25

TripleS is a South Korean girl group with 24 members that rotate through various sub-units. As of August 2026, TripleS have released three studio albums, eight extended plays, three compilation albums, three single albums, and twenty-five singles across all sub-units. The group made their debut in October 2022 when their first sub-unit, Acid Angel from Asia, released the EP Access and debut single "Generation". The EP debuted at number nine on South Korea's Circle Album Chart. In February 2023 the group as a whole released their first EP with Assemble, and its lead single "Rising". The band's second sub-unit, Krystal Eyes, debuted in May of that year with the EP Aesthetic, followed in June by the group's first single album, Cherry Gene, which was a combined released by the Acid Angel from Asia and Krystal Eyes subunits under the name Acid Eyes. In the second half of 2023, the band released two additional EPs: Muhan under the Lovelution sub-unit in August, followed by Mujuk under the Evolution sub-unit in October. The band ended 2023 by releasing "Just Do It" in December, the first digital single by seventh sub-unit NXT.

2024 saw additional growth, kicking off in January with the release of the group's second single album, Structure of Sadness, this time as the Aria sub-unit. The group made their debut as a completed 24-member ensemble with their first studio album Assemble24 and its lead single "Girls Never Die". The album peaked at number three on the Circle Album Chart, TripleS's highest position to date. In June, an additional single, "Inner Dance", was released under the Glow sub-unit, followed by another studio album, Performante, by the Visionary Vision sub-unit.

In November 2024, TripleS debuted their first Japanese sub-unit, ∞! (Hatchi), with the single "Untitled".

== TripleS ==
=== Studio albums ===
List of TripleS studio albums, showing selected details, selected chart positions, sales figures, and certifications
Title	Details	Peak chart positions	Sales	Certifications
Title	Details	KOR	Sales	Certifications
Assemble24	Released: May 8, 2024; Label: Modhaus; Formats: CD, digital download, streaming	3	KOR: 211,609	
Assemble25	Released: May 12, 2025; Label: Modhaus; Formats: CD, digital download, streaming	3	KOR: 461,413	KMCA: Platinum (Cosmo)
Love & Pop Pt. 3	Scheduled: January 27, 2027; Label: Modhaus, SM Entertainment Japan, Sony Music; Formats: CD, digital download, streaming	To be released		

=== Extended plays ===
List of TripleS extended plays, showing selected details, selected chart positions, sales figures, and certifications
Title	Details	Peak chart positions	Sales	Certifications
Title	Details	KOR	Sales	Certifications
Assemble	Released: February 13, 2023; Label: Modhaus; Formats: CD, digital download, streaming	6	KOR: 54,857	
Love & Pop Pt. 1	Released: June 1, 2026; Label: Modhaus, The Orchard; Formats: CD, digital download, streaming; Track listing: 1. "Sad Girls Schemin'"; 2. "Peer"; 3. "Baby Flower"; 4. "Type of Girl"; 5. "Sleek"; 6. "I Like That"; 7. "Me Myself Mode"	2	KOR: 518,253	KMCA: Platinum (Cosmo)

=== Compilation albums ===
List of compilation albums, showing selected details
Title	Details
4study4work4inst Vol.1	Released: February 2, 2024; Label: Modhaus; Formats: Digital download, streaming; Track listing: 1. "Generation" (inst.); 2. "Rolex" (inst.); 3. "Charla" (inst.); 4. "Dimension" (AAA ver.; inst.); 5. "Beam" (inst.); 6. "Rising" (inst.); 7. "Colorful" (inst.); 8. "The Baddest" (inst.); 9. "New Look" (inst.); 10. "Cherry Talk" (inst.); 11. "Touch" (inst.); 12. "Hide & Seek" (inst.); 13. "Deja-Vu" (inst.); 14. "Dimension" (KRE ver.; inst.); 15. "Touch+" (inst.); 16. "Girls' Capitalism" (inst.); 17. "Complexity" (inst.); 18. "Black Soul Dress" (inst.); 19. "Seoul Sonyo Sound" (inst.); 20. "Cry Baby" (inst.); 21. "Speed Love" (inst.); 22. "Invincible" (inst.); 23. "Rhodanthe" (inst.); 24. "Heavy Metal Wings" (inst.); 25. "37.5 Celsius" (inst.); 26. "Moto Princess" (inst.); 27. "Oui" (inst.); 28. "Enhanced Flower" (inst.); 29. "Just Do It" (inst.); 30. "Door" (inst.); 31. "Farewell My First" (inst.)
4study4work4inst Vol.2	Released: February 2, 2025; Label: Modhaus; Formats: Digital download, streaming; Track listing: 1. "Girls Never Die" (inst.); 2. "Heart Raider" (inst.); 3. "Midnight Flower" (inst.); 4. "White Soul Sneakers" (inst.); 5. "Chiyu" (inst.); 6. "24" (inst.); 7. "Beyond the Beyond" (inst.); 8. "Non Scale" (inst.); 9. "Dimension" (inst.); 10. "Inner Dance" (inst.); 11. "Hit the Floor" (inst.); 12. "Choom" (inst.); 13. "Éclair" (inst.); 14. "Love Soseol" (inst.); 15. "Atmosphere" (VV ver.; inst.); 16. "12 Rings" (inst.); 17. "Vision" (inst.); 18. "Bionic Power" (inst.)
4study4work4inst Vol.3	Released: February 2, 2026; Label: Modhaus; Formats: Digital download, streaming; Track listing: 1. "Are You Alive" (inst.); 2. "Detective Soseol" (inst.); 3. "Firework Diary" (inst.); 4. "Love Child" (inst.); 5. "Persona" (inst.); 6. "Too Hot" (inst.); 7. "Diablo" (inst.); 8. "Friend Zone" (inst.); 9. "Love2Love" (inst.); 10. "Fly Up" (inst.); 11. "Cameo Love" (inst.); 12. "Bubble Gum Girl" (inst.); 13. "Q&A" (inst.); 14. "Christmas Alone" (inst.)

=== Singles ===
==== Korean singles ====
List of TripleS Korean singles, showing year released, selected chart positions, and name of the album
Title	Year	Recorded by	Peak chart positions	Album
Title	Year	Recorded by	KOR	Album
"Rising"	2023	Kim Yoo-yeon, Kim Na-kyoung, Seo Da-hyun, Yoon Seo-yeon, Kim Chae-yeon, Gong Yu-bin, Lee Ji-woo, Kaede, Jeong Hye-rin, Kim Soo-min	110	Assemble
"Girls Never Die"	2024	TripleS	27	Assemble24
"Are You Alive" (깨어)	2025	TripleS	130	Assemble25
"Christmas Alone"	2025	TripleS	— (Note: "Christmas Alone" did not enter the Circle Digital Chart, but peaked at number 28 on the Circle Download Chart.)	Beyond Beauty
"Baby Flower" (Note: The Japanese version of "Baby Flower" was released on June 3, 2026.)	2026	TripleS	153	Love & Pop Pt.1
"Andless" (Note: "Andless" was released as the lead track of the digital single "Love & Pop Pt. 2".)	2026	TripleS	— (Note: "Andless" did not enter the Circle Digital Chart, but peaked at number 74 on the Circle Download Chart.)	Non-album singles
"I Want You To Know"	2026	TripleS	— (Note: "I Want You To Know" did not enter the Circle Digital Chart, but peaked at number 91 on the Circle Download Chart.)	Non-album singles

==== Japanese singles ====
List of TripleS Japanese singles, showing year released, and name of the album
Title	Year	Recorded by	Album
"###" (Hash) (Note: "###" was released as part of TripleS ∞!'s first Japanese maxi single "Untitled".)	2024	TripleS	SecretHimitsuBimil
"Rising" (Note: The Japanese version of "Rising" and "Girls Never Die" were released on April 12, 2025.)	2025	TripleS	SecretHimitsuBimil
"Girls Never Die"	2025	TripleS	SecretHimitsuBimil

=== Soundtrack appearances ===
List of soundtrack appearances, showing year released and name of the album
Title	Year	Recorded by	Album
"Paindrop"	2025	Park So-hyun, Yoon Seo-yeon, Gong Yu-bin, Lee Ji-woo	Friendly Rivalry OST Part.4

=== Promotional singles ===
List of promotional singles, showing year released and name of the album
Title	Year	Recorded by	Album
"Polaroid"	2024	Mayu, Kim Na-kyoung, Park Shi-on, Kim Chae-won	Non-album singles
"Dreaming"	2024	Kim Yoo-yeon, Seo Da-hyun, Gong Yu-bin, Park Shi-on	Non-album singles
"PinkPower"	2025	Yoon Seo-yeon, Gong Yu-bin, Park Shi-on, Jeong Hye-rin	Non-album singles
"World Wild Women"	2026	TripleS	Non-album singles

=== Other charted songs ===
List of other charted TripleS songs, showing year released, selected chart positions, and name of the album
Title	Year	Recorded by	Peak chart positions	Album
Title	Year	Recorded by	KOR DL	Album
"Before the Rise"	2023	Kim Na-kyoung	149	Assemble
"Beam"	2023	Kim Yoo-yeon, Kim Na-kyoung, Seo Da-hyun, Yoon Seo-yeon, Kim Chae-yeon, Gong Yu-bin, Lee Ji-woo, Kaede, Jeong Hye-rin, Kim Soo-min	111	Assemble
"Colorful"	2023	Kim Yoo-yeon, Kim Na-kyoung, Seo Da-hyun, Yoon Seo-yeon, Kim Chae-yeon, Gong Yu-bin, Lee Ji-woo, Kaede, Jeong Hye-rin, Kim Soo-min	96	Assemble
"The Baddest"	2023	Kim Yoo-yeon, Kim Na-kyoung, Seo Da-hyun, Yoon Seo-yeon, Kim Chae-yeon, Gong Yu-bin, Lee Ji-woo, Kaede, Jeong Hye-rin, Kim Soo-min	134	Assemble
"New Look"	2023	Kim Yoo-yeon, Kim Na-kyoung, Seo Da-hyun, Yoon Seo-yeon, Kim Chae-yeon, Gong Yu-bin, Lee Ji-woo, Kaede, Jeong Hye-rin, Kim Soo-min	109	Assemble
"Chowall" (초월)	2023	Kim Na-kyoung, Yoon Seo-yeon	158	Assemble
"S"	2024	Xinyu, Nien, Yoon Seo-yeon	130	Assemble24
"Heart Raider" (가시권)	2024	TripleS	102	Assemble24
"Midnight Flower"	2024	TripleS	103	Assemble24
"White Soul Sneakers"	2024	TripleS	112	Assemble24
"Chiyu" (치유)	2024	TripleS	110	Assemble24
"24"	2024	TripleS	90	Assemble24
"Beyond the Beyond" (이면의 이면)	2024	TripleS	113	Assemble24
"Non Scale"	2024	TripleS	107	Assemble24
"Dimension"	2024	TripleS	108	Assemble24
"@% (Alpha Percent)"	2025	Yoon Seo-yeon	80	Assemble25
"Detective Soseol" (추리소설)	2025	TripleS	59	Assemble25
"Firework Diary" (어제 우리 불꽃놀이)	2025	TripleS	63	Assemble25
"Love Child"	2025	TripleS	69	Assemble25
"Persona"	2025	TripleS	68	Assemble25
"Too Hot"	2025	TripleS	67	Assemble25
"Diablo"	2025	TripleS	62	Assemble25
"Friend Zone"	2025	TripleS	72	Assemble25
"Love2Love"	2025	TripleS	66	Assemble25
"Sad Girls Schemin'"	2026	TripleS	60	Love & Pop Pt.1
"Peer"	2026	Yoon Seo-yeon	75	Love & Pop Pt.1
"Type of Girl"	2026	TripleS	67	Love & Pop Pt.1
"Sleek"	2026	TripleS	65	Love & Pop Pt.1
"I Like That"	2026	TripleS	64	Love & Pop Pt.1
"Me Myself Mode"	2026	TripleS	61	Love & Pop Pt.1

== Acid Angel from Asia ==
=== Extended plays ===
List of AAA extended plays, showing selected details, and sales figures
Title	Details	Peak chart positions	Sales
Title	Details	KOR	Sales
Access	Released: October 28, 2022; Label: Modhaus; Formats: CD, digital download, streaming	9	KOR: 32,946

=== Singles ===
List of AAA singles, showing year released, selected chart positions, and name of the album
Title	Year	Recorded by	Peak chart positions		Album
Title	Year	Recorded by	KOR	NZ Hot	Album
"Generation"	2022	Kim Yoo-yeon, Kim Na-kyoung, Gong Yu-bin, Jeong Hye-rin	194	34	Access

== Krystal Eyes ==
=== Extended plays ===
List of Krystal Eyes extended plays, showing selected details, and sales figures
Title	Details	Peak chart positions	Sales
Title	Details	KOR	Sales
Aesthetic	Released: May 4, 2023; Label: Modhaus; Formats: CD, digital download, streaming	8	KOR: 55,229

=== Singles ===
List of Krystal Eyes singles, showing year released, selected chart positions, and name of the album
Title	Year	Recorded by	Peak chart positions	Album
Title	Year	Recorded by	KOR DL	Album
"Cherry Talk"	2023	Yoon Seo-yeon, Kim Chae-yeon, Lee Ji-woo, Kim Soo-min	93	Aesthetic
"Touch+"	2023	Park So-hyun, Yoon Seo-yeon, Kim Chae-yeon, Lee Ji-woo, Kim Soo-min	—	Non-album single
"—" denotes releases that did not chart or were not released in that region.

== Acid Eyes ==
=== Single albums ===
List of Acid Eyes single albums, showing selected details
Title	Details
Cherry Gene	Released: June 6, 2023; Label: Modhaus; Formats: Digital download, streaming; Track listing: 1. "Cherry Gene" (Baddest mix); 2. "Cherry Gene" (Hy-Fluid mix); 3. "Cherry Gene" (Testarossa mix)

=== Singles ===
List of Acid Eyes singles, showing year released, and name of the album
Title	Year	Recorded by	Album
"Cherry Gene" (Baddest mix)	2023	Kim Yoo-yeon, Kim Na-kyoung, Yoon Seo-yeon, Kim Chae-yeon, Gong Yu-bin, Lee Ji-woo, Jeong Hye-rin, Kim Soo-min	Cherry Gene

== Lovelution ==
=== Extended plays ===
List of Lovelution extended plays, showing selected details, and sales figures
Title	Details	Peak chart positions	Sales
Title	Details	KOR	Sales
Muhan	Released: August 17, 2023; Label: Modhaus; Formats: CD, digital download, streaming	14	KOR: 36,144

=== Singles ===
List of Lovelution singles, showing year released, selected chart positions, and name of the album
Title	Year	Recorded by	Peak chart positions	Album
Title	Year	Recorded by	KOR DL	Album
"Girls' Capitalism"	2023	Xinyu, Park So-hyun, Seo Da-hyun, Nien, Yoon Seo-yeon, Gong Yu-bin, Kaede, Jeong Hye-rin	43	Muhan

=== Other charted songs ===
List of other charted Lovelution songs, showing year released, selected chart positions, and name of the album
Title	Year	Recorded by	Peak chart positions	Album
Title	Year	Recorded by	KOR DL	Album
"Complexity" (복합성)	2023	Xinyu, Park So-hyun, Seo Da-hyun, Nien, Yoon Seo-yeon, Gong Yu-bin, Kaede, Jeong Hye-rin	166	Muhan
"Black Soul Dress"	2023	Xinyu, Park So-hyun, Seo Da-hyun, Nien, Yoon Seo-yeon, Gong Yu-bin, Kaede, Jeong Hye-rin	162	Muhan
"Seoul Sonyo Sound"	2023	Xinyu, Park So-hyun, Seo Da-hyun, Nien, Yoon Seo-yeon, Gong Yu-bin, Kaede, Jeong Hye-rin	182	Muhan
"Cry Baby"	2023	Xinyu, Park So-hyun, Seo Da-hyun, Nien, Yoon Seo-yeon, Gong Yu-bin, Kaede, Jeong Hye-rin	158	Muhan
"Speed Love"	2023	Xinyu, Park So-hyun, Seo Da-hyun, Nien, Yoon Seo-yeon, Gong Yu-bin, Kaede, Jeong Hye-rin	167	Muhan

== Evolution ==
=== Extended plays ===
List of Evolution extended plays, showing selected details, and sales figures
Title	Details	Peak chart positions	Sales
Title	Details	KOR	Sales
Mujuk	Released: October 11, 2023; Label: Modhaus; Formats: CD, digital download, streaming	12	KOR: 35,162

=== Singles ===
List of Evolution singles, showing year released, selected chart positions, and name of the album
Title	Year	Recorded by	Peak chart positions	Album
Title	Year	Recorded by	KOR DL	Album
"Invincible"	2023	Kim Yoo-yeon, Mayu, Kim Na-kyoung, Kotone, Kim Chae-yeon, Lee Ji-woo, Kim Soo-min, Kwak Yeon-ji	52	Mujuk

=== Other charted songs ===
List of other charted Evolution songs, showing year released, selected chart positions, and name of the album
Title	Year	Recorded by	Peak chart positions	Album
Title	Year	Recorded by	KOR DL	Album
"Rhodanthe"	2023	Kim Yoo-yeon, Mayu, Kim Na-kyoung, Kotone, Kim Chae-yeon, Lee Ji-woo, Kim Soo-min, Kwak Yeon-ji	195	Mujuk

== NXT ==
=== Singles ===
List of NXT singles, showing year released, selected chart positions, and name of the album
Title	Year	Recorded by	Peak chart positions	Album
Title	Year	Recorded by	KOR DL	Album
"Just Do It"	2023	Park Shi-on, Lynn, Jeong Ha-yeon, Joobin	114	Non-album single

== Aria ==
=== Single albums ===
List of Aria single albums, showing selected details
Title	Details
Structure of Sadness	Released: January 15, 2024; Label: Modhaus; Formats: Digital download, streaming; Track listing: 1. "Door"; 2. "Farewell My First" (첫 이별)

=== Singles ===
List of Aria singles, showing year released, selected chart positions, and name of the album
Title	Year	Recorded by	Peak chart positions	Album
Title	Year	Recorded by	KOR DL	Album
"Door"	2024	Seo Da-hyun, Nien, Kim Chae-yeon, Lee Ji-woo, Kaede	70	Structure of Sadness

== Glow ==
=== Singles ===
List of Glow singles, showing year released, selected chart positions, and name of the album
Title	Year	Recorded by	Peak chart positions	Album
Title	Year	Recorded by	KOR DL	Album
"Inner Dance" (내적 댄스)	2024	Jiyeon, Sullin, Kim Chae-won, Seoah	79	Non-album single

== Visionary Vision ==
=== Studio albums ===
List of VV studio albums, showing selected details, selected chart positions, sales figures, and certifications
Title	Details	Peak chart positions	Sales	Certifications
Title	Details	KOR	Sales	Certifications
Performante	Released: October 23, 2024; Label: Modhaus; Formats: CD, digital download, streaming	3	KOR: 337,203	KMCA: Platinum (Cosmo)

=== Singles ===
List of VV singles, showing year released, selected chart positions, and name of the album
Title	Year	Recorded by	Peak chart positions	Album
Title	Year	Recorded by	KOR DL	Album
"Hit the Floor"	2024	Kim Yoo-yeon, Xinyu, Kim Na-kyoung, Park So-hyun, Nien, Jiyeon, Kotone, Gong Yu-bin, Kaede, Lynn, Jeong Hye-rin, Kwak Yeon-ji	52	Performante

=== Other charted songs ===
List of other charted VV songs, showing year released, selected chart positions, and name of the album
Title	Year	Recorded by	Peak chart positions	Album
Title	Year	Recorded by	KOR DL	Album
"Visual Virtue"	2024	Kim Yoo-yeon, Xinyu, Kim Na-kyoung, Park So-hyun, Nien, Ji-yeon, Kotone, Gong Yu-bin, Kaede, Lynn, Jeong Hye-rin, Kwak Yeon-ji	118	Performante
"Choom"	2024	Kim Yoo-yeon, Xinyu, Kim Na-kyoung, Park So-hyun, Nien, Ji-yeon, Kotone, Gong Yu-bin, Kaede, Lynn, Jeong Hye-rin, Kwak Yeon-ji	111	Performante
"Éclair"	2024	Kim Yoo-yeon, Xinyu, Kim Na-kyoung, Park So-hyun, Nien, Ji-yeon, Kotone, Gong Yu-bin, Kaede, Lynn, Jeong Hye-rin, Kwak Yeon-ji	116	Performante
"Love Soseol" (연애소설)	2024	Kim Yoo-yeon, Xinyu, Kim Na-kyoung, Park So-hyun, Nien, Ji-yeon, Kotone, Gong Yu-bin, Kaede, Lynn, Jeong Hye-rin, Kwak Yeon-ji	113	Performante
"Atmosphere (VV ver.)"	2024	Kim Yoo-yeon, Xinyu, Kim Na-kyoung, Park So-hyun, Nien, Ji-yeon, Kotone, Gong Yu-bin, Kaede, Lynn, Jeong Hye-rin, Kwak Yeon-ji	117	Performante
"12 Rings"	2024	Kim Yoo-yeon, Xinyu, Kim Na-kyoung, Park So-hyun, Nien, Ji-yeon, Kotone, Gong Yu-bin, Kaede, Lynn, Jeong Hye-rin, Kwak Yeon-ji	123	Performante
"Vision"	2024	Kim Yoo-yeon, Xinyu, Kim Na-kyoung, Park So-hyun, Nien, Ji-yeon, Kotone, Gong Yu-bin, Kaede, Lynn, Jeong Hye-rin, Kwak Yeon-ji	119	Performante
"Bionic Power"	2024	Kim Yoo-yeon, Xinyu, Kim Na-kyoung, Park So-hyun, Nien, Ji-yeon, Kotone, Gong Yu-bin, Kaede, Lynn, Jeong Hye-rin, Kwak Yeon-ji	125	Performante
"Visionary Vision"	2024	Kim Yoo-yeon, Xinyu, Kim Na-kyoung, Park So-hyun, Nien, Ji-yeon, Kotone, Gong Yu-bin, Kaede, Lynn, Jeong Hye-rin, Kwak Yeon-ji	131	Performante

== ∞! (Hatchi) ==
=== Extended plays ===
List of Hatchi extended plays, showing selected details, and sales figures
Title	Details	Peak chart positions	Sales
Title	Details	JPN	Sales
SecretHimitsuBimil	Released: October 1, 2025; Label: Modhaus; Formats: CD, digital download, streaming; Track listing: 1. "Password"; 2. "Headphones" (ヘッドフォン); 3. "Tokimetique" (トキメティック); 4. "Tokyo"; 5. "Oshare"; 6. "Untitled" (アンタイトル); 7. "###" (Hash) (Hatchi Ver.); 8. "Girls Never Die" (Japanese Ver.); 9. "Rising" (Japanese Ver.)	15	JPN: 7,586

=== Singles ===
List of Hatchi singles, showing year released, selected chart positions, sales figures, and name of the album
Title	Year	Recorded by	Peak chart positions	Sales	Album
Title	Year	Recorded by	JPN	Sales	Album
"Untitled" (アンタイトル)	2024	Kim Yoo-yeon, Mayu, Kotone, Kim Chae-yeon, Lee Ji-woo, Park Shi-on, Kim Chae-won, Kim Soo-min	4	JPN: 10,765	SecretHimitsuBimil
"Password"	2025	Kim Yoo-yeon, Mayu, Kotone, Kim Chae-yeon, Lee Ji-woo, Park Shi-on, Kim Chae-won, Kim Soo-min	—	—N/a	SecretHimitsuBimil
"—" denotes releases that did not chart or were not released in that region.

== MSNZ ==
=== Extended plays ===
List of MSNZ extended plays, showing selected details, selected chart positions, sales figures, and certifications
Title	Details	Peak chart positions	Sales	Certifications
Title	Details	KOR	Sales	Certifications
Beyond Beauty	Released: November 24, 2025; Label: Modhaus; Formats: CD, digital download, streaming; Track listing: 1. "Magic Shine New Zone"; 2. "Fly Up"; 3. "Cameo Love"; 4. "Bubble Gum Girl"; 5. "Q&A"; 6. "Christmas Alone"	2	KOR: 352,610	KMCA: Platinum (Cosmo)

=== Singles ===
==== Korean singles ====
List of MSNZ Korean singles, showing year released, selected chart positions, and name of the album
Title	Year	Recorded by	Peak chart positions	Album
Title	Year	Recorded by	KOR DL	Album
"Fly Up"	2025	Neptune (Kim Na-kyoung, Seo Da-hyun, Nien, Yoon Seo-yeon, Kotone, Seoah)	48	Beyond Beauty
"Cameo Love"	2025	Moon (Park So-hyun, Jiyeon, Kaede, Park Shi-on, Lynn, Sullin)	49	Beyond Beauty
"Bubble Gum Girl"	2025	Sun (Kim Yoo-yeon, Mayu, Xinyu, Kim Chae-yeon, Jeong Hye-rin, Kim Chae-won)	59	Beyond Beauty
"Q&A"	2025	Zenith (Gong Yu-bin, Lee Ji-woo, Jeong Ha-yeon, Kim Soo-min, Kwak Yeon-ji, Joobin)	58	Beyond Beauty

==== Japanese singles ====
List of MSNZ Japanese singles, showing year released, and name of the album
Title	Year	Recorded by	Album
"Dream Dress"	2026	Moon	Love & Pop Pt.3
"DNA (Dream N Access)"	2026	Sun	Love & Pop Pt.3
"Welcome to Heaven"	2026	Neptune	Love & Pop Pt.3
"See You"	2026	Zenith	Love & Pop Pt.3

=== Other charted songs ===
List of other charted MSNZ songs, showing year released, selected chart positions, and name of the album
Title	Year	Recorded by	Peak chart positions	Album
Title	Year	Recorded by	KOR DL	Album
"Magic Shine New Zone"	2025	Xinyu, Yoon Seo-yeon, Jiyeon, Kaede	73	Beyond Beauty

== Videography ==
=== Music videos ===
Title	Year	Director(s)	Ref.
"Generation"	2022	Oh Ji-won (Undermood Film)	
"Rising"	2023	Oh Ji-won (Undermood Film)	
"Cherry Talk"	2023	Oh Ji-won (Undermood Film)	
"Touch+"	2023	Unknown	
"Girls' Capitalism"	2023	Oh Ji-won (Undermood Film)	
"Invincible"	2023	Ha Junghoon, Lee Hyesung (Hattrick)	
"Door"	2024	Unknown	
"Girls Never Die"	2024	Oh Ji-won (Undermood Film)	
"Hit the Floor"	2024	Oh Ji-won (Undermood Film)	
"Untitled"	2024	Sunny Visual	
"Are You Alive" (깨어)	2025	Yunah Sheep	
"Password"	2025	Ziyong Kim (Fantazylab)	
"Fly Up"	2025	Ziyong Kim (Fantazylab)	
"Cameo Love"	2025	Ziyong Kim (Fantazylab)	
"Q&A"	2025	Eom Tae Jun	
"Bubble Gum Girl"	2025	Eom Tae Jun	
"Baby Flower" (Japanese version)	2026	Jooyeong Yun (Earthluk)	
"Andless"	2026	Unknown	

=== Other videos ===
Title	Year	Ref.
"thesis"	2022	
"We are S"	2022	
"signalis"	2022	
"YoonSeoYeon.SSS"	2022	
"JeongHyeRin.SSS"	2022	
"LeeJiWoo.SSS"	2022	
"KimChaeYeon.SSS"	2022	
"KimYooYeon.SSS"	2022	
"objekt"	2022	
"KimSooMin.SSS"	2022	
"KimNaKyoung.SSS"	2022	
"GongYuBin.SSS"	2022	
"Kaede.SSS"	2022	
"SeoDaHyun.SSS"	2022	
"Kotone.SSS"	2023	
"KwakYeonJi.SSS"	2023	
"Nien.SSS"	2023	
"ParkSoHyun.SSS"	2023	
"Xinyu.SSS"	2023	
"Mayu.SSS"	2023	
"Lynn.SSS"	2023	
"JooBin.SSS"	2023	
"JeongHaYeon.SSS"	2023	
"ParkShiOn.SSS"	2023	
"Just Do It (Performance)"	2023	
"KimChaeWon.SSS"	2024	
"Sullin.SSS"	2024	
"SeoAh.SSS"	2024	
"JiYeon.SSS"	2024	
"the system"	2024	
"Inner Dance" (내적 댄스) Official Reels Compilation	2024	
"Non Scale" Official Stage Dance	2024	
"Christmas Alone" Special Clip	2025	
