= Love & Pop (series) =

2026–2027 musical releases by TripleS

Assemble26 'Love & Pop' (stylized as <LOVE&POP>) is a three-part series of releases by South Korean girl group tripleS. It is composed of the EP Love & Pop Pt. 1 released on June 1, 2026, the single album Love & Pop Pt. 2 released on October 16, 2026, and the Japanese-language studio album Love & Pop Pt. 3 which is set to release on January 27, 2027. Pt. 1 and Pt. 2 were released by Modhaus and distributed by Kakao Entertainment, while Pt. 3 will be released by SMEJ Holdings and distributed by Sony Music Entertainment Japan.

== Background ==
On January 26, 2026, tripleS announced the multi-part series Assemble26 'Love & Pop' as the group's first full group release since 2025's Assemble25. They stated that the series' first part would release in the first half of 2026 and would emphasize the series' "Love Side", and the second part would emphasize its "Pop Side". On May 1, a teaser was posted to tripleS' official YouTube channel announcing that the series would have a third part which would release in January 2027.

== Love & Pop Pt. 1 ==
Love & Pop Pt. 1
- Digital cover

EP by TripleS
- Released: June 1, 2026
- Recorded: 2026
- Genre: K-pop
- Length: 17:06
- Languages: Korean; English
- Labels: Modhaus; Kakao

TripleS chronology
Beyond Beauty (2025)	Love & Pop Pt. 1 (2026)	Love & Pop Pt. 3 (2027)

Singles from Love & Pop Pt. 1
- 1. "Baby Flower" Released: June 1, 2026

Love & Pop Pt. 1 (stylized as <LOVE&POP> pt.1) is the second extended play by South Korean girl group tripleS. It is the first of three parts in the Love & Pop series. It was released on June 1, 2026 by Modhaus and distributed by Kakao Entertainment.

It is composed of six tracks, including lead single "Baby Flower". Unlike previous releases by tripleS, the EP's lead single was chosen by tripleS' company, Modhaus, rather than by a fan vote.

=== Release and promotion ===
From May 6, 2026, to May 9, 2026, tripleS released concept photos showing members of sub-units "Moon", "Sun", "Neptune", and "Zenith" respectively, collectively titled "Local Perspective". A concept photo of the full group for Pt. 1 was released on May 10. According to Jang Eun-ji of Sports Donga:

The image evokes the feeling of catching a glimpse into the everyday lives of the girls, set in a space filled with comic books, trinkets, and snacks.

Concept photos showing the members of the sub-units with a similar theme were released each day from May 11 to 14. The following day, photos of the full group were published showing an alternate "wallflower" concept, followed by similar sub-unit photos released daily from May 16 to 19. On May 22, the track listing for Pt. 1 was revealed. A highlight medley for Pt. 1's tracks was released on May 27, followed by a music video teaser for the EP's lead single "Baby Flower" on May 29.

tripleS at the Baby Flower Showcase

tripleS officially released Love & Pop Pt. 1 on June 1, 2026. On the day of the EP's release, tripleS held a showcase at Blue Square Woori WON Banking Hall in Yongsan District, Seoul, South Korea. On June 3, the Japanese version of "Baby Flower" was released along with an alternate music video.

On June 4, The music show promotional cycle for "Baby Flower" began with a performance on M Countdown, followed by Music Bank on June 5, Show! Music Core on June 6, Inkigayo on June 7, Show Champion on June 10, Music Bank on June 12, and Inkigayo on June 14. They also performed the EP's first track "Sad Girls Schemin'" on June 7, 10, and 12.

On the June 10, 2026 episode of Show Champion, "Baby Flower" received a first-place award. It won another first-place award on the June 12, 2026 episode of Music Bank.

==== Baby Flower City Remixes ====
On June 8, 2026, tripleS released Baby Flower City Remixes, a remix EP containing four remixes of "Baby Flower", each named after a different city: "Seoul Remix" by Vendors, "Bangkok Remix" by Kurtz, "Taipei Remix" by ntrophy, and "Tokyo Remix" by Full8loom.

=== Composition and theme ===
"Baby Flower"
"Baby Flower" is the lead single and third track of Love & Pop Pt. 1. In the words of Top Star News' Han Seo-yeong, the song's message can be described as: "You aren't the only one who feels this way; we're all in the same boat, so let's bloom like flowers".

Love & Pop Pt. 1 focuses on themes of coming of age, discovering your own potential, and overcoming self-doubt shared with previous full-group releases by tripleS such as Assemble24 and Assemble25. According to group member Jiyeon:

We refer to those who have realized their dreams as "big S's" and those who have yet to achieve their dreams as "little s's". We were all little s's once too; that's why we poured so much extra effort into this album—to give energy to those who are still on their journey.

Member Shion noted that the album has a brighter tone than tripleS' previous releases, with Yoon Seo-yeon adding that this makes the EP easier for anyone to enjoy.

Park So-hyun is credited for songwriting on the EP's fifth track, "Sleek". She initially wrote it with the image of a fashion model in mind, inspired by how modelling highlights one's unique personality.

=== Commercial performance ===
Domestically, Love & Pop Pt. 1 was a commercial success. Upon its release, it entered the weekly Circle Chart at its peak of number two, later being ranked as the sixth-best-selling album on June's monthly chart before exiting the following month. Within its first three days, Love & Pop Pt. 1 had sold approximately 475,000 copies, making it the sixth-best-selling release by a K-pop girl group in 2026 at that point, behind only Deadline by Blackpink, Lemonade by Aespa, Revive+ by Ive, Choom by Babymonster, and Pureflow Pt. 1 by Le Sserafim. In the week after its release, the EP received over 567,600 total sales, surpassing Assemble25 as tripleS' most successful release in terms of first week sales.

The music video for the EP's lead single, "Baby Flower", received more than 3,300,000 views on YouTube within its first 24 hours, as well as over 32 million views by June 15, 2026.

=== Track listing ===
Credits adapted from Spotify.

Track listing for Love & Pop Pt. 1
No.	Title	Music	Length
1.	"Sad Girls Schemin'"	Kurtz, bby Nasdaqüe, gyuahh, Sungwoo Kim, XD, ynghardy, niü	2:42
2.	"Peer"	Jaden Jeong, BADD	1:01
3.	"Baby Flower"	Jaden Jeong, EL CAPITXN, Vendors (KAYTZ, Zenur, Kyaku, Louis), jongsoo Kim	3:08
4.	"Type of Girl"	Dino Medanhodzic, Ellen Berg, YNGA, Nirob Islam, 153/Joombas (서용원, 하다원, 라경민, 엄세정, 강지혜), Jaden Jeon	3:09
5.	"Sleek"	Jaden Jeong, Park So-hyun, MonoTree (GDLO, YELO)	2:31
6.	"I Like That"	BADD, MonoTree (G-High), Sophiya	2:16
7.	"Me Myself Mode"	Jaden Jeong, BADD, MonoTree (GDLO), HOUZY, 주우영	2:19
Total length:			17:06

All music is composed by Jaden Jeong, EL CAPITXN, Vendors (KAYTZ, Zenur, Kyaku, Louis), and jongsoo Kim.

Track listing for Baby Flower City Remixes
No.	Title	Music	Length
1.	"Baby Flower (Seoul Remix: Vendors)"		3:08
2.	"Baby Flower (Bangkok Remix: Kurtz)"	Kurtz, J.DOOR, Seo9	3:15
3.	"Baby Flower (Taipei Remix: ntrophy)"	imsuho, N!ko, Naasim	3:11
4.	"Baby Flower (Tokyo Remix: Full8loom)"	Full8loom (allblend, 방건우)	3:14
Total length:			12:49

=== Charts ===
==== Weekly charts ====
Weekly chart performance for Love & Pop Pt. 1
Chart (2026)	Peak position
South Korean Albums (Circle)	2

==== Monthly charts ====
Monthly chart performance for Love & Pop Pt. 1
Chart (2026)	Peak position
South Korean Albums (Circle)	6

=== Certifications and sales ===
Certifications with pure sales where available
Region	Certification	Certified units/sales
South Korea (KMCA)	Platinum	250,000^{*}
^{*} Sales figures based on certification alone.

=== Release history ===
Release history and formats for Love & Pop Pt. 1
Region	Date	Format	Label
South Korea	June 1, 2026	CD; digital download; streaming	Modhaus; Kakao Entertainment
Various	June 1, 2026	Digital download; streaming	Modhaus; Kakao Entertainment

== "Love & Pop Pt. 2" ==
"Andless"
- Digital cover

Song by TripleS
- Language: Korean; English
- Released: October 16, 2026
- Recorded: 2026
- Genre: K-pop; drum and bass; electronic pop
- Length: 2:46
- Label: Modhaus; Kakao

TripleS singles chronology
"Welcome to Heaven" (2026)	"Andless" (2026)	"See You" (2026)

"Love & Pop Pt. 2" (stylized as <LOVE&POP> pt.2) is a digital single by South Korean girl group tripleS. It is the second of three parts in the Love & Pop series. It was released on October 16, 2026, by Modhaus and distributed by Kakao Entertainment. It contains the lead track "Andless".

=== Release and promotion ===
At the first show of the Andless World Tour on October 10, 2026, tripleS performed "Andless" for the first time. The following day, a concept photo of the full group was published. From October 12 to October 14, Modhaus released various concept photos of tripleS' individual members. On October 15, a music video teaser for "Andless" was released on tripleS' official YouTube channel. "Love & Pop Pt. 2" was officially released at 1 p.m. Korean Standard Time (UTC+9) on October 16, 2026. tripleS performed "Andless" on M Countdown on October 22.

=== Composition ===
The sole track of "Love & Pop Pt. 2", "Andless", is an electronic pop song with drum and bass inspiration. Park Dong-je of BreakNews described the track as sounding "intense" and "explosive". It was co-written by Lindgren, who had worked on the soundtrack for KPop Demon Hunters.

=== Critical reception ===
Han Seong-hyeon of IZM gave the song three-point-five out of five stars, praising the track for its choral harmony and aggressive electronic sounds which distinguish it from rest of tripleS' discography, but criticizing it for its poorly-handled English lyrics.

=== Track listing ===
Credits adapted from Spotify.

No.	Title	Music	Length
1.	"Andless"	Melanie Fontana, Lindgren, Ilja Krut, Jaro, A-Dee, Christian Fast	2:46
Total length:			2:46

== Love & Pop Pt. 3 ==
Love & Pop Pt. 3

Studio album by TripleS
- Released: January 27, 2027
- Recorded: 2026
- Genres: J-pop; K-pop
- Languages: Japanese; English
- Labels: SM Japan; Sony Japan

TripleS chronology
Love & Pop Pt. 1 (2026)	Love & Pop Pt. 3 (2027)

Singles from Love & Pop Pt. 3
- 1. "Dream Dress" Released: August 1, 2026; 2. "DNA (Dream N Access)" Released: September 1, 2026; 3. "Welcome to Heaven" Released: October 1, 2026; 4. "See You" Released: November 1, 2026

Love & Pop Pt. 3 is the upcoming debut Japanese-language studio album by South Korean girl group tripleS, as well as their third overall. It is the final of three parts in the Love & Pop series. It is slated to be released on January 27, 2027, by SMEJ Holdings and distributed by Sony Music Entertainment Japan.

Before its release, tracks "Dream Dress", "DNA (Dream N Access)", "Welcome to Heaven", and "See You" were pre-released as digital singles.

=== Background and release ===
A teaser was posted to tripleS' official YouTube channel on May 1 announcing that Love & Pop would have three parts, the final of which releasing in January 2027. On October 31, tripleS announced that the album would release on January 27, 2027, during the Tokyo stop of the Andless World Tour, as well as that a concert to promote it would be held on February 11, 2027.

On August 1, 2026, the song "Dream Dress" by sub-unit Moon (Note: Containing members Sullin, Park So-hyun, Jiyeon, Kaede, Park Shi-on, and Lynn.) was released digitally. On tripleS' official press release for the single, it is subtitled "Chapter 1: Blank / 'Hey, what kind of city is Tokyo?'". "DNA (Dream N Access)" by sub-unit Sun (Note: Containing members Xinyu, Kim Yoo-yeon, Mayu, Kim Chae-yeon, Jeong Hye-rin, and Kim Chae-won.) was released digitally on September 1. On September 5, an Objekt (Note: Digital photocards used by artists under Modhaus through the Cosmo app)-trading event was held to promote the single. Neptune's (Note: Containing members Yoon Seo-yeon, Kim Na-kyoung, Seo Da-hyun, Nien, Kotone, and Seoah.) single, "Welcome to Heaven", was released digitally on October 1. Another Objekt-trading event was held to promote "Welcome to Heaven" on October 4 at Bellesalle Toranomon in Minato, Tokyo. Zenith (Note: Containing members Jeong Ha-yeon, Gong Yu-bin, Lee Ji-woo, Kim Soo-min, Kwak Yeon-ji, and Joobin.) released "See You" on November 1.

=== Composition ===
As of October 2026, it is unknown how many tracks there will be on Love & Pop Pt. 3.

"Dream Dress" is a song inspired by J-pop and dream pop with bright synth lines. According to Moon Won-sik of Star News:

"Dream Dress" is described as a song that captures the emotions between longing for a glamorous world and reality, as well as the hearts of young women seeking value and meaning within a monotonous daily life.

"DNA (Dream N Access)" is a fast-paced, high-energy song whose lyrics center around the excitement one feels when they form a genuine connection with someone. "Welcome to Heaven" portrays the experience of being drawn into a sweet, alluring world, centering around a theme of "consumption". "See You" is a low-tempo song with lyrics centered around a theme of "collapse".

== Andless World Tour ==
Andless World Tour
- Tour by TripleS
- Tour poster
- Associated albums: Love & Pop series
- Start date: October 10, 2026
- End date: November 26, 2026
- Legs: 2
- No. of shows: 6 in North America; 5 in Asia; 11 in total

TripleS concert chronology
- My Secret New Zone (2026); Andless World Tour (2026)

The Andless World Tour (also called tripleS 2026 World Tour <Andless>) is the fourth world tour by South Korean girl group tripleS and is done in support of the Love & Pop series. The tour began on October 10, 2026, in Seoul, South Korea, and will finish on November 26, 2026, in Vancouver, Canada.

=== Background ===
Before the tour began in Seoul, tripleS announced that ticket prices to their first two shows would be reduced to ₩30,000 (equivalent to US$22.60), noted by the Hankook Ilbo as far lower than other K-pop groups who often charge over ₩100,000 (equivalent to $75.40) for general admission tickets.

=== Set list ===
Adapted from the set list in Seoul on October 10 and 11, 2026. It may not reflect other tour dates.

==== Main set ====
1. "Baby Flower"
2. "Bionic Power"
3. "Non Scale"
4. "Love2Love"
5. "Detective Soseol" (Korean: 추리소설)
6. "World Wild Women"
7. "Lit Pop"
8. "Girl's Capitalism" (Lovelution)
9. "Complexity" (Lovelution)
10. "Dream Drip" (Aura)
11. "Cheer Up" (Sun) (originally by Twice)
12. "Replay" (Zenith) (originally by Shinee)
13. "Psycho" (Moon) (originally by Red Velvet)
14. "Mr. Mr." (Neptune) (originally by Girls' Generation)
15. "Sad Girls Schemin'"
16. "Diablo"
17. "Are You Alive"
18. "Rising"
19. "Girls Never Die"
20. "Hit the Floor"
21. "Andless"

==== Encore ====
1. "Me Myself Mode"
2. "Choom"
3. "24"
4. "Midnight Flower"

=== Tour dates ===
List of 2026 concerts
Date	City	Country	Venue
October 10	Seoul	South Korea	Jangchung Arena
October 11	Seoul	South Korea	Jangchung Arena
October 18	Taipei	Taiwan	Taipei International Convention Center
October 24	Macau		Broadway Macau
October 31	Tokyo	Japan	Kanadevia Hall
November 11	Toronto	Canada	Massey Hall
November 14	New York City	United States	Kings Theatre
November 18	Chicago	United States	Copernicus
November 21	Dallas	United States	Music Hall a Fair Park
November 25	Los Angeles	United States	The Wiltern
November 28	Vancouver	Canada	The Centre
