= Beyond Beauty =

2025 extended play by MSNZ

- Digital cover

EP by TripleS
- Released: November 24, 2025
- Recorded: 2025
- Genres: K-pop; pop; electronic
- Length: 15:11
- Languages: Korean; English
- Labels: Modhaus; Kakao

TripleS chronology
SecretHimitsuBimil (2025)	Beyond Beauty (2025)	Love & Pop Pt. 1 (2026)

Singles from Beyond Beauty
- 1. "Cameo Love" Released: November 24, 2025; 2. "Bubble Gum Girl" Released: November 24, 2025; 3. "Fly Up" Released: November 24, 2025; 4. "Q&A" Released: November 24, 2025; 5. "Christmas Alone" Released: November 24, 2025

Beyond Beauty is the debut extended play by South Korean girl group MSNZ, a collection of four sub-units – Moon, Sun, Neptune, and Zenith – of TripleS. Beyond Beauty was released on November 24, 2025 by Modhaus and distributed by Kakao Entertainment.

The EP contains six tracks, including the intro track "Magic Shine New Zone" and five simultaneously released lead singles: "Cameo Love" by Moon, "Bubble Gum Girl" by Sun, "Fly Up" by Neptune, "Q&A" by Zenith, and "Christmas Alone", a Christmas single recorded by all 24 members of TripleS.

== Background ==
MSNZ unit line-ups
Moon	Sun	Neptune	Zenith
Sullin (leader)	Xinyu (leader)	Yoon Seo-yeon (leader)	Jeong Ha-yeon (leader)
Park So-hyun	Kim Yoo-yeon	Kim Na-kyoung	Gong Yu-bin
Jiyeon	Mayu	Seo Da-hyun	Lee Ji-woo
Kaede	Kim Chae-yeon	Nien	Kim Soo-min
Park Shi-on	Jeong Hye-rin	Kotone	Kwak Yeon-ji
Lynn	Kim Chae-won	Seoah	Joobin

On September 3, 2025, TripleS announced a new project called MSNZ which would split the group into four six-member sub-units named Moon, Sun, Neptune, and Zenith, each with a different concept. The members of each unit were chosen via fan vote from September 5 to September 10. From September 19 to 21, MSNZ held a second fan-vote to determine the song each unit would record for Beyond Beauty. The chosen songs were: "Cameo Love" for Moon, "Bubble Gum Girl" for Sun, "Fly Up" for Neptune, and "Q&A" for Zenith.

== Release and promotion ==
On November 1, 2025, TripleS released a video teaser for Beyond Beauty. Concept photos for the members of each unit were released: Moon on November 4, Sun on November 7, Neptune on November 10, and Zenith on November 14. From November 18 to 22, teasers were released each day for the music videos of "Q&A", "Fly Up", "Bubble Gum Girl", "Cameo Love", and "Christmas Alone" respectively. MSNZ released Beyond Beauty on November 24. It received over 180,000 sales in its first day and approximately 362,000 in its first week.

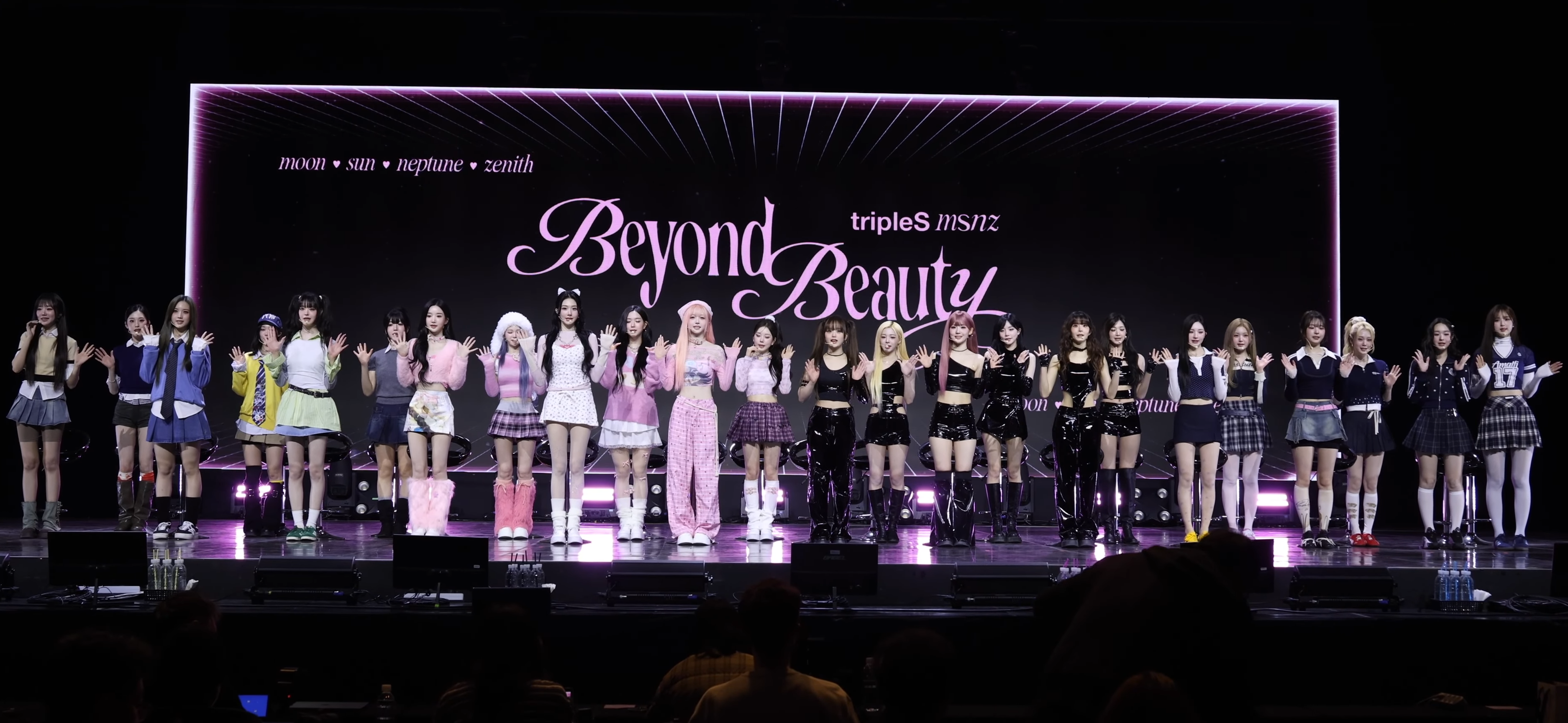
TripleS at the Beyond Beauty showcase

On the day of the EP's release, a showcase was held at the Blue Square SOL Travel Hall where the units performed their songs for the first time. "Christmas Alone", recorded by all 24 members of TripleS, was performed at Music Bank on November 28, as well as Show! Music Core and Inkigayo the following two days and Show Champion on December 3.

During the first week of December, the unit tracks were promoted at various music shows: "Cameo Love" at Music Bank on December 5, "Bubble Gum Girl" at Show! Music Core on December 6, and both "Fly Up" and "Q&A" at Inkigayo on December 7.

On December 8, Lotte Home Shopping hosted a special hour-long (Note: From the fact that 24,000 photocards were sold during the broadcast at a rate of 400 per minute.) broadcast with TripleS to promote the sales of the limited-edition MSNZ Objekt (Note: Digital photocards in the form of NFTs used by TripleS.) collection. It aired on the e-commerce platform Llive as well as Lotte Home Shopping's official YouTube channel, starting at 12:35 PM. The show featured performances of songs on Beyond Beauty. It also featured a segment in which group member Kim Chae-yeon portrayed a young CEO of Lotte Corporation. It was announced on December 17 that more than 24,000 photocards were sold during the broadcast, the vast majority of which to consumers under the age of 30.

== Composition ==
Beyond Beauty features a total of six tracks, each of which covering distinct genres and themes. The EP begins with the spoken word track "Magic Shine New Zone". It has lyrics in Korean, English, Japanese, and Chinese which portray a gateway between dreams and reality. Neptune's "Fly Up" is a nu-disco track composed by group member Park So-hyun which uses a "la la la" hook found in other TripleS songs. It expresses themes of independence and letting go of self-doubt. Moon's track, "Cameo Love", is a drum-and-bass-inspired pop song. Thematically, it focuses on how one feels like they've been relegated to the role of a side character in a situation of unrequited love.

"Bubble Gum Girl" by Sun is a bright electronic pop song aesthetically inspired by Y2K and Frutiger Aero. It uses bubble gum and candy as a metaphor for the feeling of love. "Q&A" is a song about the excitement, bewilderment, and hope that come with one's first love. "Christmas Alone" is an electronic pop song with Jersey club elements recorded by all 24 members. It conveys a theme of how you can still experience joy from the holiday season even when you experience it alone.

== Track listing ==
Credits adapted from Spotify.

No.	Title	Music	Length
1.	"Magic Shine New Zone"	Jaden Jeong, BADD, allblend	0:54
2.	"Fly Up" (Neptune)	Park So-hyun, allblend, BADD, Jin-ri, Kang Ji-yun, Sungwoo Kim, Youra, H4NA, On Sam-wol, SKAA, Choi Di-di, Chae Eun-yu	2:40
3.	"Cameo Love" (Moon)	Jaden Jeong, Larry Contreras, Gabrielle Puggi, Victoria Marchlewski, Park So-hyun, Lee Eun-o, Song Hye-gyo, nogeum, Kang Yi-rum, 507, Lee Si-dae	2:35
4.	"Bubble Gum Girl" (Sun)	Jaden Jeong, KagoPengchi, Leah Mathies, Robin Lundbäck, Yoo Ji-sang, Choi Mae-yi, Murphy, Seon-hee, Hwang Su-min, 329, Sungwoo Kim, Kang Se-bi, Jeong Ha-ri, Rizin, Dahlia Kim, Yoon Ye-ji	2:48
5.	"Q&A" (Zenith)	Holy Holy, Inner Child, MonoTree	3:26
6.	"Christmas Alone"	Jaden Jeong, An Seong-hyeon, VAN.C, Imsu, Mr.Black, Sungwoo Kim, Joo Si-keu, Reonchi	2:51
Total length:			15:11

== Charts ==
=== Weekly charts ===
Weekly chart performance for Beyond Beauty
Chart (2025–2026)	Peak position
South Korean Albums (Circle)	2

=== Monthly charts ===
Monthly chart performance for Beyond Beauty
Chart (2025–2026)	Peak position
South Korean Albums (Circle)	8

=== Year-end charts ===
Year-end chart performance for Beyond Beauty
Chart (2025)	Position
South Korean Albums (Circle)	68

== Release history ==
Release history and formats for Beyond Beauty
Region	Date	Format	Label
South Korea	November 20, 2025	CD; digital download; streaming	Modhaus; Kakao Entertainment
Various	November 20, 2025	Digital download; streaming	Modhaus; Kakao Entertainment
