= Love and pop (disambiguation) =

Love & Pop is a Japanese film released in 1998.

Love and pop may also refer to:

- Love & Pop (series), series of musical releases by TripleS
- Love + Pop, studio album by Nick Rattigan
- Love + Pop Pt.2, studio album by Nick Rattigan
- Epic Love and Pop Songs, a play by Phoebe Eclair-Powell
