= Yoon Seo-yeon =

South Korean singer (born 2003)

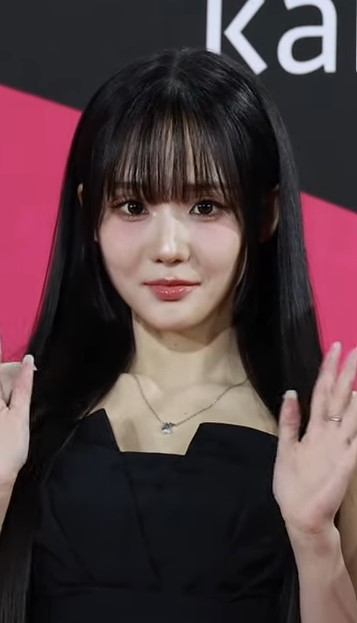
- Yoon in November 2024
- Born: August 6, 2003 (age 23); Daejeon, South Korea
- Occupations: Singer; dancer; rapper
- Musical career
- Origin: South Korea
- Genre: K-pop
- Instrument: Vocals
- Years active: 2022–present
- Label: Modhaus
- Member of: TripleS

Korean name
- Hangul: 윤서연
- RR: Yun Seoyeon
- MR: Yun Sŏyŏn

Yoon Seo-yeon (Korean: 윤서연, born August 6, 2003) is a South Korean singer and actress. She is a member of the South Korean girl group TripleS and its subunits Krystal Eyes, Acid Eyes, Lovelution and Neptune.

== Personal life ==
Yoon Seo-yeon was born in Daejeon, South Korea, on August 6, 2003. Yoon received several recruitment offers from various entertainment agencies in the past, but denied them all as she thought that being a celebrity wasn't for her and continued preparing to retake the CSAT. Yoon watched K-Pop idol performances when she was young and wanted to give it a try but did not have any idol training. When she received the offer from her current agency, she decided to accept the offer, as she had always thought her life was like a "supporting character" rather than a "main character", so she was motivated to give it a try.

== Career ==
=== 2022–present: Debut with tripleS ===
On May 1, 2022, Yoon was revealed as the first member of the 24 member girl group, TripleS. Prior to joining TripleS, Yoon had no prior idol training and was recruited through Instagram as she frequently uploaded videos of her singing. On September 16, TripleS announced they would be debuting their first two sub-units, with the members being voted by fans. On September 22, Yoon became the first member announced as a member of the sub-unit Krystal Eyes. On October 21, Yoon released her first solo photobook titled "Yoon SeoYeon 'The Face'". Yoon held solo fan signing events to commemorate the release of her first solo photobook.

Yoon officially debuted with the group on February 13, 2023, with the mini album Assemble. Following with the debut of Krystal Eyes on May 4, 2023, with their mini album, Aesthetic. On April 20, TripleS announced that they would be debuting their next sub-units. Yoon was announced as the second member of Lovelution on April 22. On May 26, Yoon was announced as a contestant on the Mnet reality survival competition show Queendom Puzzle, and finished the show with the final ranking of 24th. Lovelution made their official subunit debut on August 17. On November 18, Yoon was announced as a participant in the AI-produced mission-based MBC reality program Gone PD.

In June 2024, Yoon entered the girl group individual brand reputation results for the first time, resulting in 90th place. On September 20, Yoon made her official acting debut in the web drama What Summer Likes as the main character, Baek Yeo-reum.

In January 2025, Yoon appeared as a supporting character in the League of Legends Champions Korea sitcom, LOL Mans. In February, A vote was conducted to select the official leader of tripleS Assemble25 album, in which Yoon was officially selected as the leader. In March, Yoon communicated with Stanford University students and explained how tripleS incorporates Web3 technology within their concept.

== Discography ==
=== Singles ===
| Title | Year | Peak chart positions | Album |
| Title | Year | KOR Gaon | Album |
|---|---|---|---|
| "Chowall" (Note: Credited under tripleS but is a duet track performed by Yoon Seo-yeon and Kim Na-kyoung.) | 2023 | — | Assemble |
| "Number 8" (Note: Credited under tripleS but is a duet track performed by Yoon Seo-yeon and Kaede.) | 2023 | — | ↀ (Muhan) |
| "S" (Note: Credited under tripleS but is a trio track performed by Yoon Seo-yeon, Nien and Xinyu.) | 2024 | 130 | Assemble24 |
| "@%" (Note: Credited under tripleS but is a solo track performed by Yoon Seo-yeon.) | 2025 | 80 | Assemble25 |
| "Magic Shine New Zone" (Note: Credited under tripleS but is a quartet track performed by Yoon Seo-yeon, Kaede, Xinyu and Ji-yeon.) | 2025 | 73 | Beyond Beauty |
| "Peer" | 2026 | 75 | Love & Pop Pt.1 |
"—" denotes releases that did not chart or were not released in that region.

=== Soundtrack appearances ===
| Title | Year | Peak chart positions | Album |
| Title | Year | KOR | Album |
|---|---|---|---|
| "PainDrop" (Sung by Park So-hyun, Gong Yu-bin, Lee Ji-woo, Yoon Seo-yeon) | 2025 | — | Friendly Rivalry OST Part.3 |
| "Pink Power" (Sung by Yoon Seo-yeon, Gong Yu-bin, Park Shi-on, Jeong Hye-rin) | 2025 | — | Pink Power |
"—" denotes releases that did not chart or were not released in that region.

=== Participation releases ===
| Title | Year | Peak chart positions | Album | Ref. |
| Title | Year | KOR | Album | Ref. |
|---|---|---|---|---|
| "Charismatic" (with JooE, Suyun, Yeonhee, Lee Soo-jin and Zoa) | 2023 | — | "Queendom Puzzle Battle Team 2" | |
| "Rise Up" (with Queendom Puzzle contestants) | 2023 | — | "Queendom Puzzle Rise Up" | |
| "Overwater" (with Fyeqoodgurl, Lee Soo-jin, Im Do-hwa, Lee Ji-woo and Miru Shiroma) | 2023 | — | "Queendom Puzzle All-Rounder Battle 2" | |
"—" denotes releases that did not chart or were not released in that region.

== Filmography ==
=== Web series ===
| Year | Title | Role | Notes | Ref. |
|---|---|---|---|---|
| 2024 | What Summer Likes | Baek Yeo-reum | Main role | |
| 2025 | LOL Mans | Yoon Seo-yeon | Supporting role | |

=== Television shows ===
| Year | Title | Role | Ref. |
|---|---|---|---|
| 2023 | Queendom Puzzle | Contestant; Placed 24th | |
| 2024 | Gone PD | Contestant | |

=== Radio ===
| Year | Title | Role | | Ref. |
|---|---|---|---|---|
| 2024 | Got7 Youngjae's Best Friend | Fixed Guest | September 1–26 | |
| 2024 | Idol Radio | Special DJ | September 2–11 | |

== Bibliography ==
=== Photobooks ===
| Title | Release date | Publisher | Notes | Ref. |
|---|---|---|---|---|
| Yoon SeoYeon.SSS Atom01 [The Face] | October 23, 2022 | Modhaus | Yoon Seo-yeon solo photobook | |
