= SecretHimitsuBimil =

- Digital cover

EP by Hatchi
- Released: October 1, 2025
- Recorded: 2025
- Genres: J-pop; K-pop; pop; electronic
- Length: 20:28 (digital); 26:33 (CD)
- Languages: Japanese; English
- Labels: Modhaus; Sony Music Japan

Hatchi chronology
| Untitled (2024) | SecretHimitsuBimil (2025) |

TripleS chronology
| Assemble25 (2025) | SecretHimitsuBimil (2025) | Beyond Beauty (2025) |

Singles from SecretHimitsuBimil
- 1. "Untitled" Released: November 20, 2024; 2. "Password" Released: September 17, 2025

SecretHimitsuBimil (Japanese and Korean: Secret秘密비밀) is the debut extended play of the South Korean and Japanese girl group Hatchi, a sub-unit of South Korean girl group TripleS. The sub-unit is composed of members Lee Ji-woo, Kim Chae-yeon, Kim Yoo-yeon, Kim Soo-min, Kotone, Mayu, Park Shi-on, and Kim Chae-won. It was released on October 1, 2025 by Modhaus and distributed by Sony Music Entertainment Japan.

The EP contains nine tracks, including pre-release singles "Untitled" (アンタイトル) and "Password", as well as "### (Hatchi Ver.)", which was an album track from Hatchi's 2024 single album "Untitled". Additionally, "Girls Never Die (Japanese Ver.)" and "Rising (Japanese Ver.)" are only avaliable on physical releases of the EP.

== Background and promotion ==
On September 14, 2024, TripleS announced that they would be forming Hatchi as an eight-member sub-unit meant for Japanese-language releases. Mayu and Park Shi-on were pre-selected as members of Hatchi, while the remaining six were chosen via fan voting. They officially debuted with the single album Untitled on November 20, containing tracks "Untitled" and "### (Hatchi Ver.)" which would later be used as tracks on SecretHimitsuBimil.

At TripleS' concert "A Live 25" at Tokyo Dome City Hall on July 21, 2025, Hatchi announced that they would be releasing their first EP in October.

SecretHimitsuBimil's lead single, "Password", was released on September 17. "Password" is a bright electronic pop song which conveys a theme of wanting to unlock a partner's heart, using technological terms such as "log in" and "Face ID". In the lead-up to the EP's release, Hatchi hosted a YouTube mini-series called "Hatch! Summer Vacation" (Korean: Hatch! 여름방학). SecretHimitsuBimil was officially released on October 1.

After the release of the EP, TripleS held their first fan meeting event in Japan, titled "tripleS ∞! 1st FANMEETING in Japan SSSch∞!" in November 2025. The event featured Japanese radio DJ Masayuki Furuya. On December 1, Hatchi held a joint concert with Japanese pop group Shiritsu Ebisu Chugaku titled "After-School Rock 'n' Roll –HYPER– 2025" (放課後ロッケンロール-HYPER- 2025) to celebrate Shiritsu Ebisu Chugaku's tenth anniversary.

The album track "Tokimetique (トキメティック)" was chosen as the theme song of TV Tokyo drama "I Thought Looks Weren't Everything" (人は見た目じゃないと思ってた).

== Track listing ==
Credits adapted from Spotify.

| No. | Title | Lyrics | Music | Arranging | Length |
|---|---|---|---|---|---|
| 1. | "Password" | Chiaki Nagasawa, Saori Nagano, p.e.t | Chiaki Nagasawa, Saori Nagano, p.e.t | p.e.t | 2:55 |
| 2. | "Headphones (ヘッドフォン)" | Mayu Wakisaka | Mayu Wakisaka, jisanpark | jisanpark | 3:00 |
| 3. | "Tokimetique (トキメティック)" | Chiaki Nagasawa, SNNJ | Chiaki Nagasawa, SNNJ | SNNJ | 2:45 |
| 4. | "TOKYO" | Zinee | Park So-hyun, hymax | Park So-hyun, hymax, Lara Andersson | 2:29 |
| 5. | "Oshare" | Rose Blueming | MonoTree, Mayu, Awrii | MonoTree | 3:24 |
| 6. | "Untitled (アンタイトル)" | Narahiyori, Sorato, YHEL, Ryo Ito | Narahiyori, Sorato, YHEL, Ryo Ito | | 2:41 |
| 7. | "### - ∞! Ver." | Rose Blueming | hymax, Hongdi, Kuzzi | hymax, Hongdi | 3:10 |
| Total length: | | | | | 20:28 |

SecretHimitsuBimil — Physical album bonus tracks
| No. | Title | Lyrics | Music | Arranging | Length |
|---|---|---|---|---|---|
| 8. | "Girls Never Die (Japanese Version)" | Jaden Jeong, Yumita Kondo | EL CAPITXN, Vendors, Maria Marcus, Arineh Karimi, BADD, jongsoo kim | EL CAPITXN, Vendors (Zenur and Nano), BADD | 3:28 |
| 9. | "Rising (Japanese Version)" | Jaden Jeong, GDLO, YELO, Simple T, Masami Kakanuma | GDLO, Artonic Waves, YELO | GDLO, Artonic Waves | 2:37 |
| Total length: | | | | | 26:33 |

== Charts ==
| Chart (2025) | Peak position |
|---|---|
| Japanese Albums (Oricon) | 15 |
