= Xinyu (singer) =

Chinese singer (born 2002)

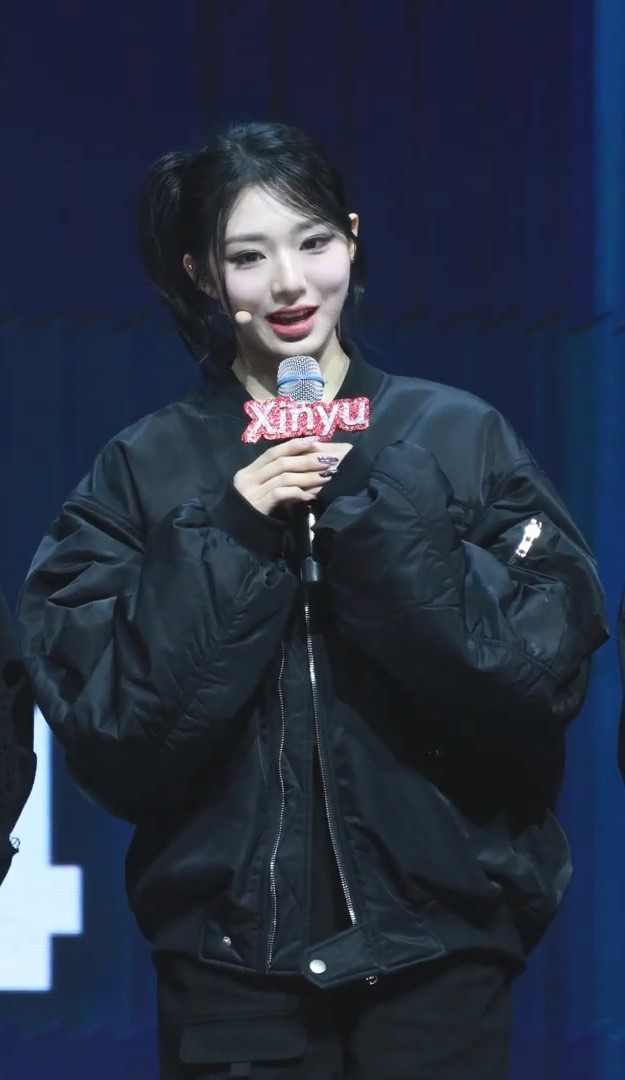
- Xinyu in May 2024
- Born: Zhou Xinyu; May 25, 2002 (age 24); Beijing, China
- Occupation: Singer
- Musical career
- Genre: K-pop
- Instrument: Vocals
- Years active: 2023–present
- Label: Modhaus
- Member of: TripleS; Lovelution; Visionary Vision; Sun

Chinese name
- Traditional Chinese: 周心語
- Simplified Chinese: 周心语
- Hanyu Pinyin: Zhōu Xīnyǔ
- Wade–Giles: Chou^{1} Hsin^{1}-yü^{3}

Zhou Xinyu (Chinese: 周心语; born May 25, 2002), known mononymously as Xinyu, is a Chinese singer. Since 2023, she is a member of South Korean multinational girl group TripleS and its sub-units Lovelution, Visionary Vision and Sun.

== Career ==
=== 2016-2022: Trainee period, Girls Planet 999 and Great Dance Crew ===
Xinyu was a trainee under YH Entertainment. In August 2021, she participated in the reality competition program Girls Planet 999 as a trainee in Group C; she ultimately ranked seventh in the group and was unable to make it into the debut group. During the program, she participated in the third performance's limited unit "7 Love Minutes" and performed the single "U+Me=Love".

Girls Planet 999 Rankings
Preliminary Rating (Theme Song Ranking)	C23
Episode 5 (First Ranking Ceremony)	C14
Episode 8 (Second Ranking Ceremony)	C13
Episode 9 (Mid-term Ranking)	C07
Episode 11 (Third Ranking Ceremony)	C07
Episode 12 (Final Ranking)	—N/a

In 2022, she participated in the first season of Youku's dance competition reality show Great Dance Crew.

=== 2023-present: Debut with TripleS ===
In July 2023, South Korean entertainment company Modhaus announced Xinyu as the fifteenth member of girl group TripleS and she became a member of the group's sub-unit Lovelution. She debuted with Lovelution on August 17 with their first EP Muhan.

On June 18, 2024, Modhaus announced Xinyu as a member of the sub-unit Visionary Vision. On October 18, the sub-unit debuted with Performante and its title track "Hit The Floor".

On September 3, 2025, Modhaus announced the MSNZ project which would form four sub-units named Moon, Sun, Neptune, and Zenith, with six members each, with Xinyu as the leader of Sun. On November 24, TripleS released the EP Beyond Beauty featuring the MSNZ sub-units.

== Personal life ==
In July 2025, Xinyu expressed her support for One China principle, including claims that Hong Kong, Macau and Taiwan all belong to the same country as the People's Republic of China. After the statement received backlash from the fanbase, Xinyu urged those who disagree to "unfollow" her on the platform.

== Discography ==
Release Date	Song Title	Performers	Album	Notes
July 12, 2021	"O.O.O (Over&Over&Over)"	Girls Planet 999	"O.O.O (Over&Over&Over)"	Girls Planet 999 theme song
October 8, 2021	"U+Me=Love"	7 Love Minutes	"Creation Mission"	Performed with Seo Young-eun, Nonaka Sana, May, Kim Soo-yeon, Sakamoto Maishiro, and Kamimoto Kotone

== Filmography ==
=== Television shows ===
Date	Name	Broadcaster
August 6, 2021 - October 15, 2021	Girls Planet 999	Mnet

=== Web shows ===
Date	Name	Broadcaster
April 16, 2022 - June 11, 2022	Great Dance Crew	Youku
