= Apgujeong High School =

Public high school located in Seoul, South Korea

- 압구정고등학교

Location
- 20 Apgujeong-ro, Gangnam-gu, Seoul; South Korea; 37°31′52″N 127°01′58″E

Information
- Type: Public high school
- Motto: 성실, 건강
- Established: March 1, 1987
- School district: Seoul Metropolitan Office of Education
- Principal: Kim Yeong-yun (김영윤)
- Faculty: 71
- Enrollment: 629
- Website: www.apgujeong.hs.kr

Korean name
- Hangul: 압구정고등학교
- Hanja: 狎鷗亭高等學校
- RR: Apgujeong godeunghakgyo
- MR: Apkujŏng kodŭnghakkyo

Former name
- Hangul: 구정고등학교
- Hanja: 鷗亭高等學校
- RR: Gujeong godeunghakgyo
- MR: Kujŏng kodŭnghakkyo

Apgujeong High School (Korean: 압구정고등학교) is a public high school located in Seoul, South Korea. It was founded in 1987 as Gujeong High School (구정고등학교), and changed its name to Apgujeong High School on September 1, 2009.

== Notable alumni ==
- Choi Si-won
- Choi Jae-ho
- Im Na-yeon
- Jay Park
- Jun Hyo-seong
- Lee Ji-woo
- RM (musician)
- Kwon Hyun-bin
- Suga (rapper)
- Park Soo-ah
- Park Solomon
- Seo Hyun-jin
- Yoo Jeong-yeon
