= Seo Da-hyun =

South Korean singer (born 2003)

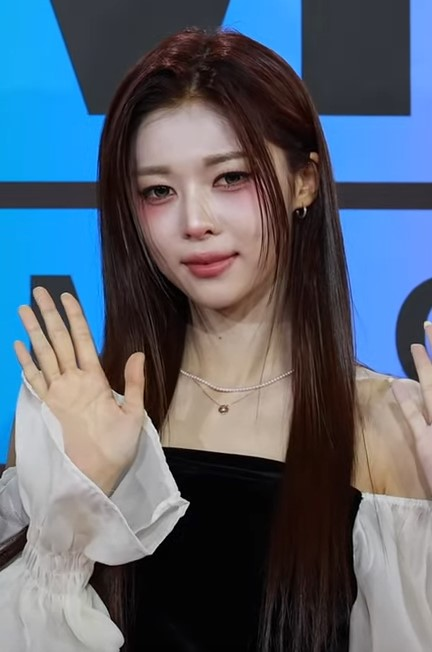
- Seo in November 2024
- Born: Seo Da-hyun; January 8, 2003 (age 23); Busan, South Korea
- Education: Hanlim Multi Art School
- Occupation: Singer
- Musical career
- Genres: K-pop
- Instrument: Vocals
- Years active: 2022–present
- Label: Modhaus
- Member of: tripleS

Korean name
- Hangul: 서다현
- RR: Seo Dahyeon
- MR: Sŏ Tahyŏn

Seo Da-hyun (Korean: 서다현; born January 8, 2003), is a South Korean singer. She is a member of the South Korean girl group TripleS and its sub-units, Lovelution, Aria and Neptune.

== Early life ==
Seo Da-hyun was born in Suyeong-gu, Busan Metropolitan City, South Korea. She graduated from Hanlim Multi Art School in the Practical Music Department. In 2018, Seo became an idol trainee at Source Music. As a trainee, she sang the chorus vocals for the girl group GFriend's song "Hope".

== Career ==
=== 2022-present: Debut with tripleS ===
On December 4, 2022, Seo was introduced as the 10th member of TripleS through the release of the original soundtrack, "I'm In Love You", for the Korean drama series Reborn Rich. Seo made her official debut with TripleS on February 13, 2023 with the EP Assemble. On April 19, Seo sang the Korean national anthem during a baseball game between Kiwoom Heroes and Samsung Lions. On April 25, Seo was placed into TripleS' new subunit Lovelution through a vote determined by fans. Lovelution made their official subunit debut on August 17. On June 9, Seo released her second original soundtrack "More Than Yesterday" for the Korean drama series Dr. Romantic 3.

On November 22, 2023, TripleS announced a new sub-unit focused around vocal performance; Seo was chosen as a pre-determined member as the leader and center of the sub-unit. The sub-unit officially made their debut on January 15, 2024 with their single album "Structure of Sadness". On February 4, Seo released her third original soundtrack "My Hope" for the Korean drama series Knight Flower On December 27, Seo released her fourth original soundtrack "First Night of Snow" for the Korean drama Your Muse, My Goddess.

== Discography ==
=== Soundtrack appearances ===
List of soundtrack appearances, showing year released, chart positions, and album name
Title	Year	Peak chart positions	Album
Title	Year	KOR Down.	Album
"I'm In Love You" (너를 사랑하고 있어)	2022	95	Reborn Rich OST Part.7
"More Than Yesterday" (오늘도 너야)	2023	—	Romantic Doctor 3 OST Part.7
"My Hope" (바램)	2024	122	Knight Flower OST Part.4
"Dreaming" (드림잉) (Sung by Kim Yoo-yeon, Seo Da-hyun, Gong Yu-bin, Park Shi-on)	2024	—	Dreaming <Shooting Stars X tripleS>
"First Night of Snow" (첫 눈이 내리는 오늘 밤)	2024	—	Your Muse, My Goddess OST Part.1
"Kung" (쿵)	2025	166	Bon Appétit, Your Majesty OST Part.4

== Filmography ==
=== Television shows ===
Year	Title	Role	Notes	Ref.
2024	King of Mask Singer	Contestant	as 'Pizza and Cola'	

=== Radio ===
Year	Title	Role	Note	Ref.
2024	Got7 Youngjae's Best Friend	Fixed Guest	October 3 – October 31	
