= Krystal Eyes =

South Korean girl group

- Origin: Seoul, South Korea
- Genres: K-pop
- Years active: 2023
- Labels: Modhaus
- Spinoff of: TripleS
- Members: Yoon Seo-yeon; Kim Chae-yeon; Lee Ji-woo; Kim Soo-min
- Website: Official website

Krystal Eyes (Korean: 크리스탈 아이즈; stylized as +(KR)ystal Eyes, abbreviated as KRE) is the second sub-unit of South Korean girl group TripleS, formed by Modhaus in 2022. It is composed of members Yoon Seo-yeon, Kim Chae-yeon, Lee Ji-woo, and Kim Soo-min. The quartet made their recording debut on May 4, 2023, with the extended play Aesthetic.

== History ==
=== 2022: Formation ===
On February 18, 2022, Modhaus announced that they would be launching the world's first "fan-participating girl group" named TripleS and that the group was set to be introduced in the first half of the year. The group is led by the CEO Jaden Jeong who helped to produce artists such as Loona and OnlyOneOf and worked with companies such as JYP Entertainment, Woollim Entertainment, Sony Music Korea and Blockberry Creative.

On September 16, it was announced that TripleS will start preparing for sub-unit debut activities with each unit having 4 members. The two sub-units were named Acid Angel From Asia and +(Kr)ystal Eyes, with Acid Angel From Asia having their debut activities first in October.

=== 2023: Debut with Aesthetic and formation of Acid Eyes ===
On March 17, 2023, it was confirmed that Krystal Eyes, the second sub-unit will debut on the first week of May. Krystal Eyes made their official debut with the extended play Aesthetic on May 4, 2023.

On May 5, 2023, Krystal Eyes released the music video for their first single "Cherry Talk". The same day, Modhaus, the label of the group, issued an official statement through their social media accounts. The announcement disclosed that:

"What we can cautiously say at the present moment is that due to individuals and forces who are taking restrictive measures against TripleS, any additional music program appearances are currently not guaranteed."

The sub-unit was unable to participate in promotional activities, such as music programs, halting their planned promotional activities.

On June 1, 2023, it was announced that Acid Angel from Asia and Krystal Eyes would release an album titled Cherry Gene together as a combined sub-unit called Acid Eyes. The lead single and its accompanying visualizer would release on June 6, with the physical album releasing sometime in July.

On June 21, 2023, the subunit unveiled its second single, "Touch+", a rendition of the original "Touch" from their extended play. This release featured a remix collaboration with another TripleS member S14 Park So-hyun.

== Members ==
- Yoon Seo-yeon (윤서연)
- Kim Chae-yeon (김채연)
- Lee Ji-woo (이지우)
- Kim Soo-min (김수민)

== Discography ==
Extended plays

- Aesthetic (2023)

== Videography ==
=== Music videos ===
Title	Year	Director	Ref.
"Cherry Talk"	2023	Oh Ji-won (Undermood Film)	
"Touch+"	2023	Unknown	
