= Lee Ji-woo =

South Korean singer (born 2005)

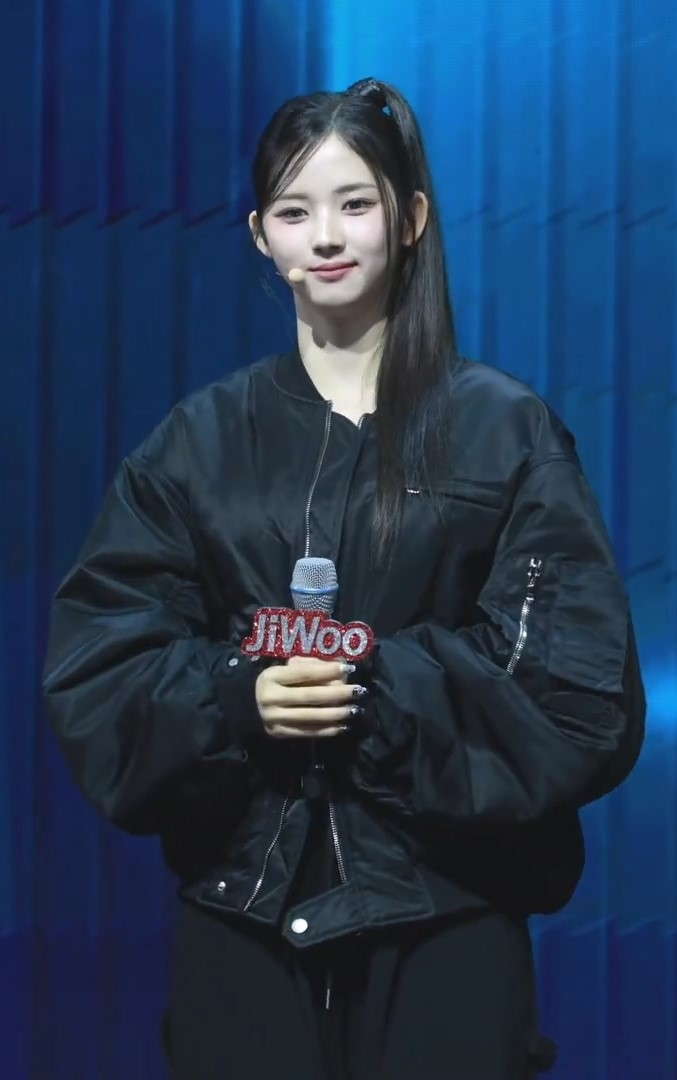
- Lee in May 2024
- Born: Lee Ji-woo; October 24, 2005 (age 21); Seoul, South Korea
- Education: Apgujeong High School; Dongguk University
- Occupations: Singer; actress
- Musical career
- Genre: K-pop
- Instrument: Vocals
- Years active: 2022–present
- Label: Modhaus
- Member of: tripleS

Korean name
- Hangul: 이지우
- Hanja: 李知禹
- RR: I Jiu
- MR: I Chiu

Lee Ji-woo (Korean: 이지우; born October 24, 2005) is a South Korean singer and actress. She is a member of the girl group TripleS and its sub-units Krystal Eyes, Acid Eyes, Evolution, Aria, Hatchi and Zenith.

She first garnered attention through her participation in the survival competition show My Teenage Girl.

== Early life ==
Lee Ji-woo was born on October 24, 2005, in Jamwon-dong, Seocho District, Seoul, South Korea. She attended Apgujeong High School and currently attends Dongguk University in the Theater Department. Since elementary school, Lee was always in charge of the class president role during school. During high school, she was also the president of the musical club. Since childhood, Lee was a junior ice hockey player with aspirations to play ice hockey professionally, however, her parents were worried she would get hurt a lot, so she changed her aspiration to be a K-Pop idol instead.

== Career ==
=== 2021–2022: Acting debut, My Teenage Girl ===
On May 12, 2021, Lee made her official acting debut in the web-series I:LOVE:DM as a leading character. On May 31, Lee initially became the teaser model for the survival competition show, My Teenage Girl. Later, she decided to join the show as a participant and was revealed as a contestant on September 13. Lee revealed during the competition that she was previously a trainee at the three major entertainment companies in South Korea. She was street cast by SM Entertainment and became an idol trainee and then transferred to YG Entertainment and moved to JYP Entertainment as an acting trainee, however later left the companies due to her difficulty of being watched and evaluated by others during her trainee life. Kwon Yu-ri, one of the shows mentors stated, "Lee is an all-rounder member, She plays a very important role. She can make the team shine on stage and show off her own abilities, she is someone with a variety of charms." Lee was unfortunately eliminated in the semi-final episode, resulting in 21st place.

=== 2022-present: Debut with tripleS ===
On June 2, 2022, Lee was announced as the third member of the girl group, tripleS. On September 26, Lee became a member of tripleS subunit Krystal Eyes through a vote determined by fans. Krystal Eyes made their official sub-unit debut on May 5. On February 13, 2023, tripleS made their official debut with the extended play, Assemble. On April 25, Lee was determined as a member of tripleS fourth sub-unit, Evolution. Evolution made their official sub-unit debut on October 11. On May 19, Lee was announced as a participant on the girl group survival show Queendom Puzzle, and finished the show with the final ranking of 13th. On November 24, Lee was determined as a member of the ballad focused sub-unit, Aria. On January 15, 2024, Aria made their official debut with a song written by Heize. On August 28, Lee was determined as a member of the Japanese sub-unit, Hatchi. The subunit made their official debut on November 20. In September 2024, Lee was cast in the web drama What I Love About Summer, as the character Woo-seul.

== Public image ==
=== In the media ===
During Lee's appearance on My Teenage Girl, she was considered the representative visual trainee among the grade 3 contestants. Lee was named one of the top five visual contestants of My Teenage Girl, along with fellow TripleS member Kim Yoo-yeon, Classy members Myung Hyung-seo and Kim Ri-won, and Rescene's Minami. Lee was briefly featured on the reality show Where Is My Home, the cast of the show created a parody version of Lee's appearance on My Teenage Girl audition trailer, with the cast acting as Lee. Additionally, Shindong, a member of Super Junior also created a parody video of Lee, dressing as Lee and re-enacting her acting in the My Teenage Girl audition trailer.

In August 2024, Lee entered the girl group individual brand reputation results for the first time, resulting in 94th place.

== Discography ==
=== Singles ===
Title	Year	Album
"Cherry 100%" (Note: Credited under tripleS but is a duet track performed by Kim Chae-yeon and Lee Ji-woo.)	2023	Aesthetic
"Enhanced Flower" (Note: Credited under tripleS but is a solo track performed by Lee Ji-woo.)	2023	⟡ (Mujuk)

=== Collaborative singles ===
Title	Year	Album
"Happiness Over Luck" (Sung by Kim Yoo-yeon, Lee Ji-woo, Mimiminu)	2025	Non-album single

=== Soundtrack appearances ===
Title	Year	Album
"PainDrop" (Sung by Park So-hyun, Yoon Seo-yeon, Gong Yu-bin, Lee Ji-woo)	2025	Friendly Rivalry OST Part.3

=== Participation releases ===
Title	Year	Album
"Same Same Different" (with My Teenage Girl contestants)	2021	Non-album single
"Charismatic" (with Jiwon, Nana, Wooyeon, Park So-eun and Jihan)	2023	Queendom Puzzle Battle Team 1
"Rise Up" (with Queendom Puzzle contestants)	2023	Queendom Puzzle Rise Up
"Hopeless Romantic" (with Im Do-hwa, Juri Takahashi and Fyeqoodgirl)	2023	Queendom Puzzle Battle Team 2
"Overwater" (with Fyeqoodgurl, Lee Soo-jin, Im Do-hwa, Yoon Seo-yeon and Miru Shiroma)	2023	Queendom Puzzle All-Rounder Battle 2
"I Do" (with Nana, Bora, Yeonhee, Zoa, Jihan, Juri Takahashi)	2023	Queendom Puzzle Semi Final
"Last Piece" (with Im Do-hwa, Yeoreum, Jang Ye-eun, Juri Takahashi, Hwiseo)	2023	Queendom Puzzle Final

=== Songwriting credits ===
List of songs, showing year released, artist name, and name of the album
Title	Year	Artist	Album	Notes
"Happiness Over Luck"	2025	Lee Ji-woo, Kim Yoo-yeon, Mimiminu	Non-Album Single	As lyricist

== Filmography ==
=== Web series ===
Year	Title	Role	Ref.
2021	I:Love:DM	Lee Ji-woo	
2024	What Summer Likes	Woo Seul	

=== Television shows ===
Year	Title	Role	Notes	Ref.
2021	Hesistation Before Going to School	Trainee	Pre-equal show to My Teenage Girl	
2021	My Teenage Girl	Contestant	Finished 21st	
2023	Queendom Puzzle	Contestant	Finished 13th	

=== Radio ===
Year	Title	Role	Notes	Ref.
2024	Idol Radio	Special DJ	September 2–11	
