= TripleS =

South Korean girl group

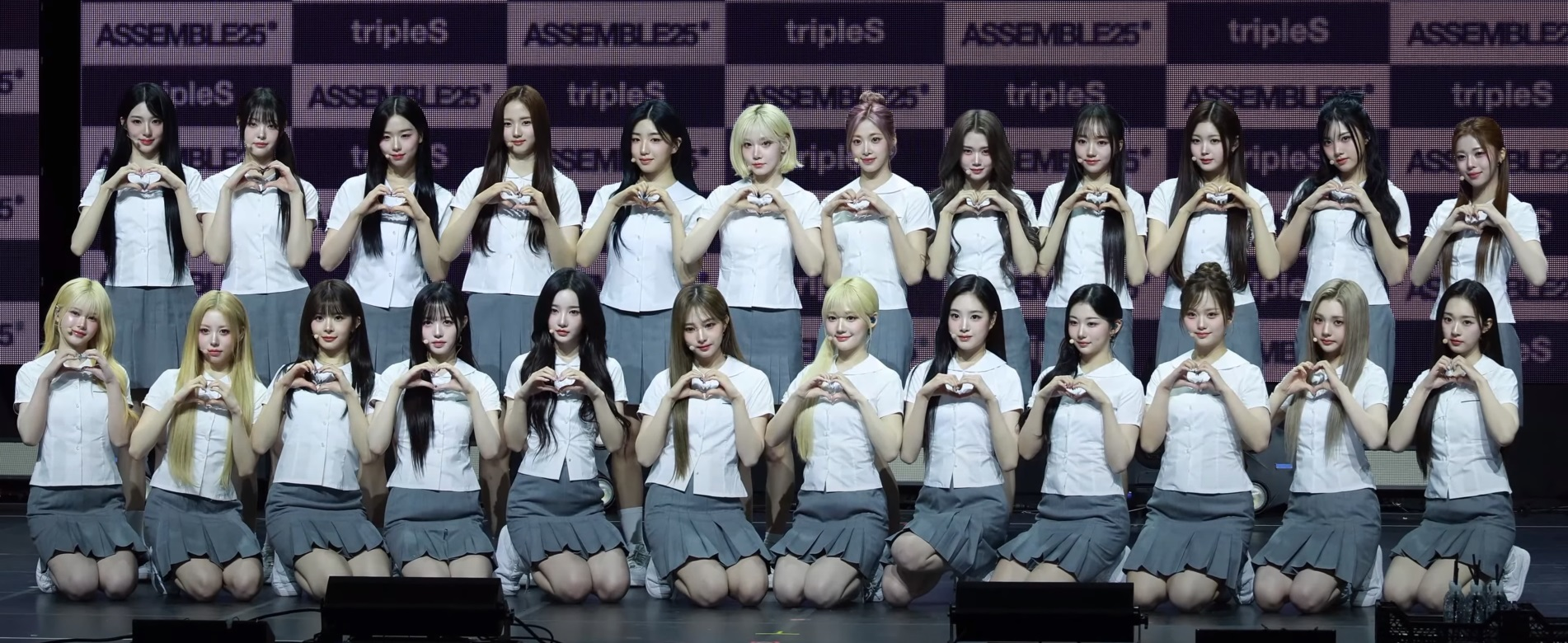
- TripleS in May 2025

Background information
- Also known as: SSS; Social Sonyo Seoul
- Origin: Seoul, South Korea
- Genre: K-pop
- Years active: 2022–present
- Labels: Modhaus; Sony Music Japan
- Spinoffs: see Sub-units
- Members: see Members
- Website: Official website

TripleS (pronounced "triple S"; Korean: 트리플에스; stylized as tripleS) is a South Korean 24-member multinational girl group formed by Modhaus. They aim to be the world's first idol group, where the members will rotate between the full group, sub-units, and solo activities, as chosen by fans. Fans are able to participate and communicate with the group, such as deciding the sub-units and the content through NFT photo cards called "Objekts".

TripleS made their official debut as a group on February 13, 2023, with their extended play (EP) Assemble.

== Name ==
The group name "TripleS" represents the concept of "the idol of all possibilities", with the three "S" letters as an acronym for "Social, Sonyo [meaning 'girl' in Korean], Seoul".

== History ==
=== Pre-debut activities ===
Prior to joining Modhaus, several members were already involved in the entertainment industry. Jeong Hye-rin was a child actress under Kids Planet, making her acting debut in the 2018 web-series Between Us; she also appeared in a commercial for Japanese textbooks. Kim Na-kyoung is the younger sister of singer Bibi and appeared in the final episode of SBS competition show The Fan. Hye-rin and Na-kyoung were former P Nation trainees. Lee Ji-woo was a former SM Entertainment, JYP Entertainment, YG Entertainment, and FNC Entertainment trainee. She made her acting debut in the web drama I:Love:Dm. Seo Da-hyun was a former Source Music trainee. In 2021, she appeared on an episode of popular Korean reality web-show Sixth Sense.

Kim Soo-min previously auditioned for P Nation and Jellyfish Entertainment. Kaede was a former child model, and she was an exclusive model for the Japanese magazine Nico Petit until 2019; after she left she became a model for clothing brands Lindiha and Lizlisa. Kim Chae-yeon is a former member of Busters and CutieL as well as an actress and television host for children's television shows Cooking Class, Tok!Tok! Boni Hani, and Quiz Monster. Park So-hyun was a popular ulzzang on social networks.

Lee Ji-woo and Kim Yoo-yeon were contestants on the MBC survival show My Teenage Girl, where Ji-woo was the lead actress for the show's teasers. Ji-woo was eliminated in the sixth round ranking 18th, while Yoo-yeon was eliminated during the final episode placing 8th. Gong Yu-bin was a contestant on the TV Chosun junior cooking show I am Chef, making it to the Top 3. Kotone, Nien, and Xinyu were contestants on the Mnet survival show Girls Planet 999; Kotone and Xinyu were eliminated in the 11th episode, with Kotone ranking P24 and J09, and Xinyu ranking P22 and C07, while Nien was eliminated on the 8th episode ranking C15. Kim Chae-won was a contestant on SBS survival show Universe Ticket, and was eliminated in the second round, ranking 69th.

=== 2022: Launching and first sub-unit's debut ===
On February 18, 2022, Modhaus announced that they would be launching the world's first "fan-participating girl group", and that the group was set to unveil in the first half of the year. The group is led by the CEO Jaden Jeong who worked with companies such as JYP Entertainment, Woollim Entertainment, Sony Music Korea, and Blockberry Creative.

The first set of members were revealed every fortnight between May 2022 until September 2022, in the order: Yoon Seo-yeon, Jeong Hye-rin, Lee Ji-woo, Kim Chae-yeon, Kim Yoo-yeon, Kim Soo-min, Kim Na-kyoung, and Gong Yu-bin.

On July 12, it was announced that TripleS will be collaborating with GS25. GS25 will be selling TripleS collaboration set products and offline photocards during the second half of 2022.

On August 8, TripleS released their official app Cosmo, as well their first bundle of digital photocards which are changed into an NFT token to vote in future events on the app.

On September 16, it was announced that TripleS will start to prepare for sub-unit debut activities. The two sub-units were Acid Angel from Asia and Krystal Eyes, with Acid Angel from Asia having their debut activities first in October. Acid Angel from Asia made their official debut on October 28, 2022, with the EP Access. The debut made both commercial and critical success; "Generation" was nominated on SBS M's The Show, and Access reached No. 1 on the iTunes US K-POP album chart.

The second set of members were revealed in November in the order: Kaede and Seo Da-hyun. In November, TripleS announced they would be debuting a 10-member unit during the beginning of 2023. Fans would be able to vote out of 8 songs which song they would want as the title track.

On December 28, TripleS announced they would begin to branch out into Japan in January 2023.

=== 2023: Debut with 10 members, debuts of units, world tour ===
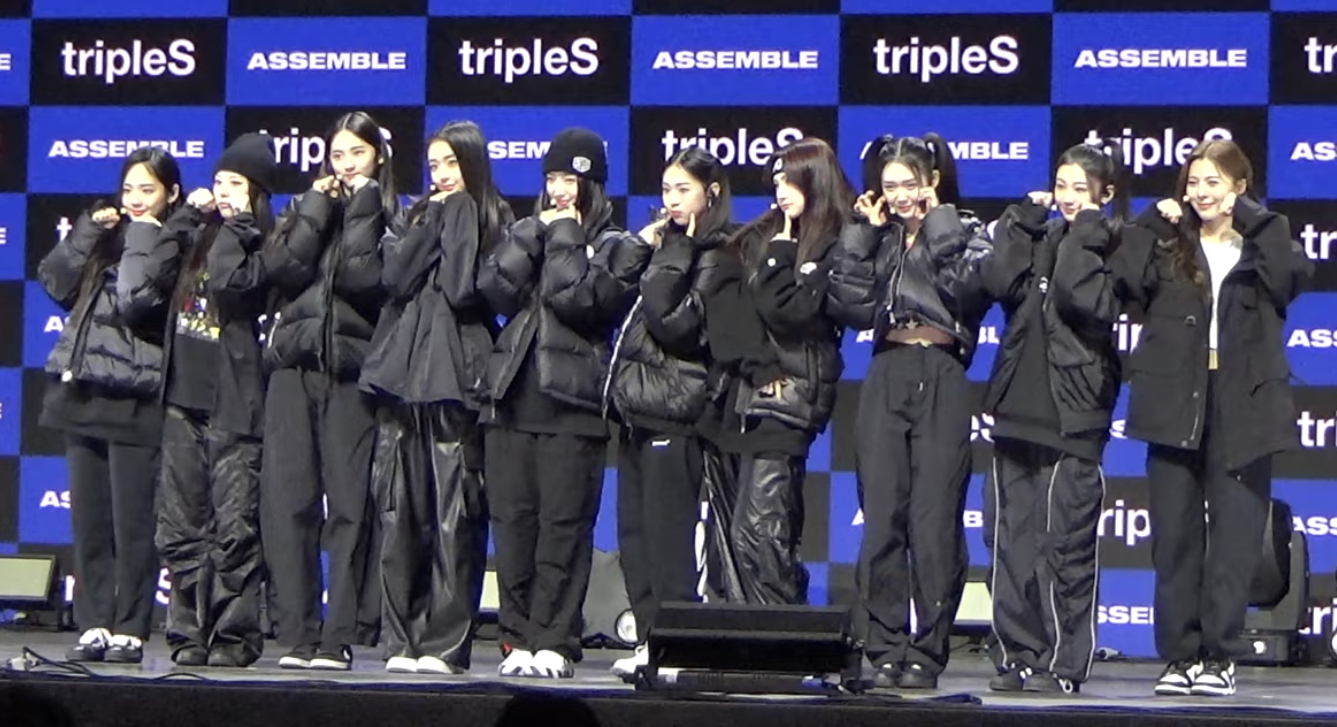
TripleS at Assemble showcase in February 2023

The third set of members were unveiled from January 2, 2023, in the order: Kotone, and Kwak Yeon-ji. On February 13, all of the members, excluding Kotone and Kwak Yeon-ji, released their debut EP Assemble, with the title track "Rising". On March 17, it was confirmed that Krystal Eyes, the group's second sub-unit, will debut on the first week of May. On March 20, Nien was revealed as the group's 13th member. On April 14, Park So-hyun was revealed as the group's 14th member and later on, an announcement video confirmed that So-hyun would produce music for the Krystal Eyes project. On April 22, TripleS, through Cosmo, held a voting for fans to select from the 14 revealed members and form two new sub-units (named Lovelution and Evolution) with eight members each. On April 29, the seven-member lineups for Lovelution and Evolution were decided, and it was then revealed that the two sub-units would be completed with the upcoming 15th and 16th members.

On May 4, the second unit Krystal Eyes released their debut EP Aesthetic with the lead single "Cherry Talk", however without the release of the lead single's music video. The unit made their debut stage in M Countdown on the same day. The next day, Modhaus released a statement through Discord that "restrictive forces" were preventing Krystal Eyes from performing on any music shows other than M Countdown and that their debut music video had been delayed. Later that day, the music video for "Cherry Talk" was released.

On June 1, it was announced that Acid Angel from Asia and Krystal Eyes would release an album titled Cherry Gene as a combined sub-unit, and the group's third sub-unit, named Acid Eyes. The lead single and accompanying visualizer were released on June 6, with the physical album released in July.

Between June and August 2023, members Yoon Seo-yeon and Lee Ji-woo took part in the Mnet reality competition show Queendom Puzzle. Seo-yeon was eliminated in episode 7, finishing 24th, while Ji-woo finished 13th in the final episode. In July 2023, Xinyu and Mayu were revealed as the 15th and 16th members, joining Lovelution and Evolution respectively. On July 28, TripleS announced that they would hold their first world tour, with its first leg to proceed with their upcoming fourth sub-unit Lovelution, titled "TripleS 1st World Tour 'Authentic' Lovelution in US" starting on September 24 in Atlanta and ending on October 14 in Los Angeles.

On August 17, the group's fourth sub-unit Lovelution officially debuted with the EP Muhan and its accompanying title track, "Girls' Capitalism". On October 11, the group's fifth sub-unit Evolution officially debuted with the EP Mujuk and its title track, "Invincible". On October 25, the second leg of TripleS's first world tour was announced, with their fifth sub-unit Evolution, titled "TripleS 1st World Tour [Authentic] Evolution in Australia". It started from December 20 in Melbourne and ended on December 23 in Brisbane.

On December 12, TripleS's upcoming sub-unit Aria was announced. The sub-unit, which would focus on ballad music, was formed through fan voting wherein four members were selected to join the group's main vocalist, Seo Da-hyun. It was then confirmed that Heize had contributed to the lyrics on the project. On December 19, TripleS's sixth sub-unit NXT was announced, and would consist of four new members. It marks the group's first sub-unit to be formed without fan voting. Starting from December 21, the members were introduced: Lynn, Joobin, Jeong Ha-yeon, and Park Shi-on. On December 23, NXT debuted with the digital single "Just Do It".

=== 2024: Debuts of Aria, the full group, Glow, Visionary Vision, and Hatchi ===
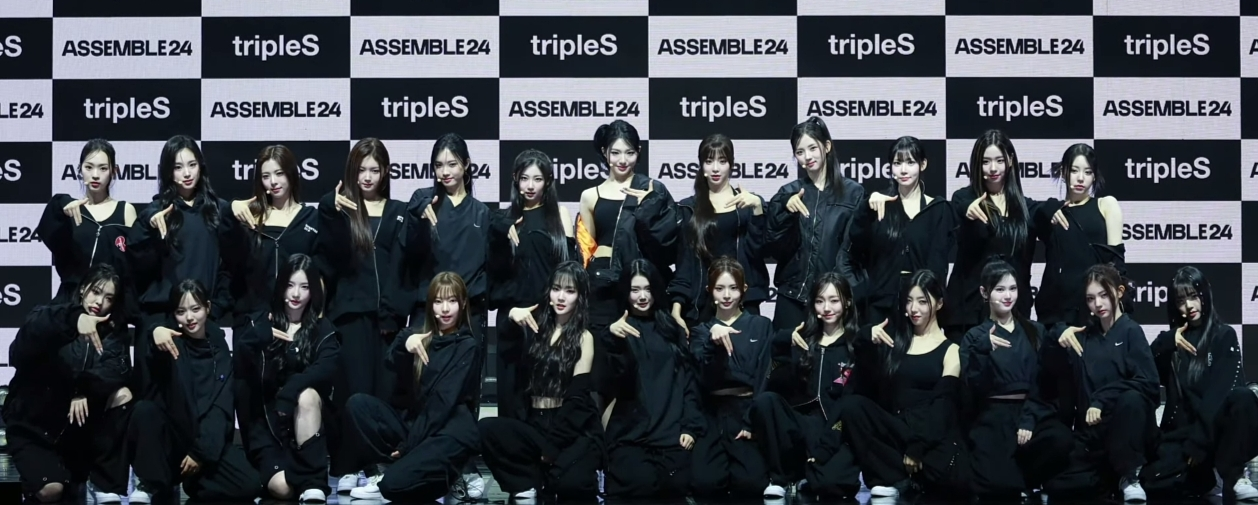
TripleS in 2024

TripleS's seventh sub-unit Aria debuted with the single album Structure of Sadness on January 15, 2024.

TripleS then held their concert titled "tripleS Authentic in Seoul" on February 3 and 4, The first day featured performances by two sub-units, Lovelution and Evolution, and the second day featured all 20 members that had been introduced. TripleS also announced in the concert that the full group composed of 24 members will debut with "Assemble24" at a later date.

Starting April 1, TripleS announced their final four members, in the order: Kim Chae-won, Sullin, Jeong Hae-rin, and Ji Suh-yeon, to complete the group's full line-up. A fan vote was held from April 5 to 7, to determine the stage names of the latter two members; the vote ended with Jeong Hae-rin's stage name SeoAh, and Ji Suh-yeon's stage name JiYeon. The four members aforementioned would also be under the group's new sub-unit Glow, for potential future activities.

TripleS made their full group debut with the first studio album Assemble24 on May 8. The album contains ten tracks, with the lead single "Girls Never Die". The full group took their first music show win on May 14, through The Show. The group will also held a fan concert called "Girls Never Stop" in Seoul on July 6 and 7.

On June 14, TripleS announced a new 12-member sub-unit Visionary Vision (VV) that would debut by the second half of 2024. The sub-unit, which would focus on dance, was formed through fan voting of nine members and internal selection of one member to join Gong Yu-bin and Lynn, who were the pre-selected members for the sub-unit. The final lineup for Visionary Vision was announced on June 18. On June 21, TripleS's eighth sub-unit Glow debuted with the digital single "Inner Dance". On July 20, the full group released their Japan pre-debut single "###" (pronounced "hash").

On September 14, TripleS announced Hatchi (∞!) as the name of the official Japanese sub-unit of the group, which consists of eight members. Hatchi was formed through fan voting of six members to join Mayu and Park Shi-on, who were the pre-selected members for the sub-unit.

On October 23, TripleS's ninth sub-unit Visionary Vision debuted with their first album Performante, which contains ten tracks including the lead single "Hit The Floor".

On November 20, TripleS's tenth sub-unit, and the group's official Japanese sub-unit Hatchi debuted with the single "Untitled".

=== 2025: Assemble25, new unit Alphie, Hatchi's comeback, MSNZ project ===
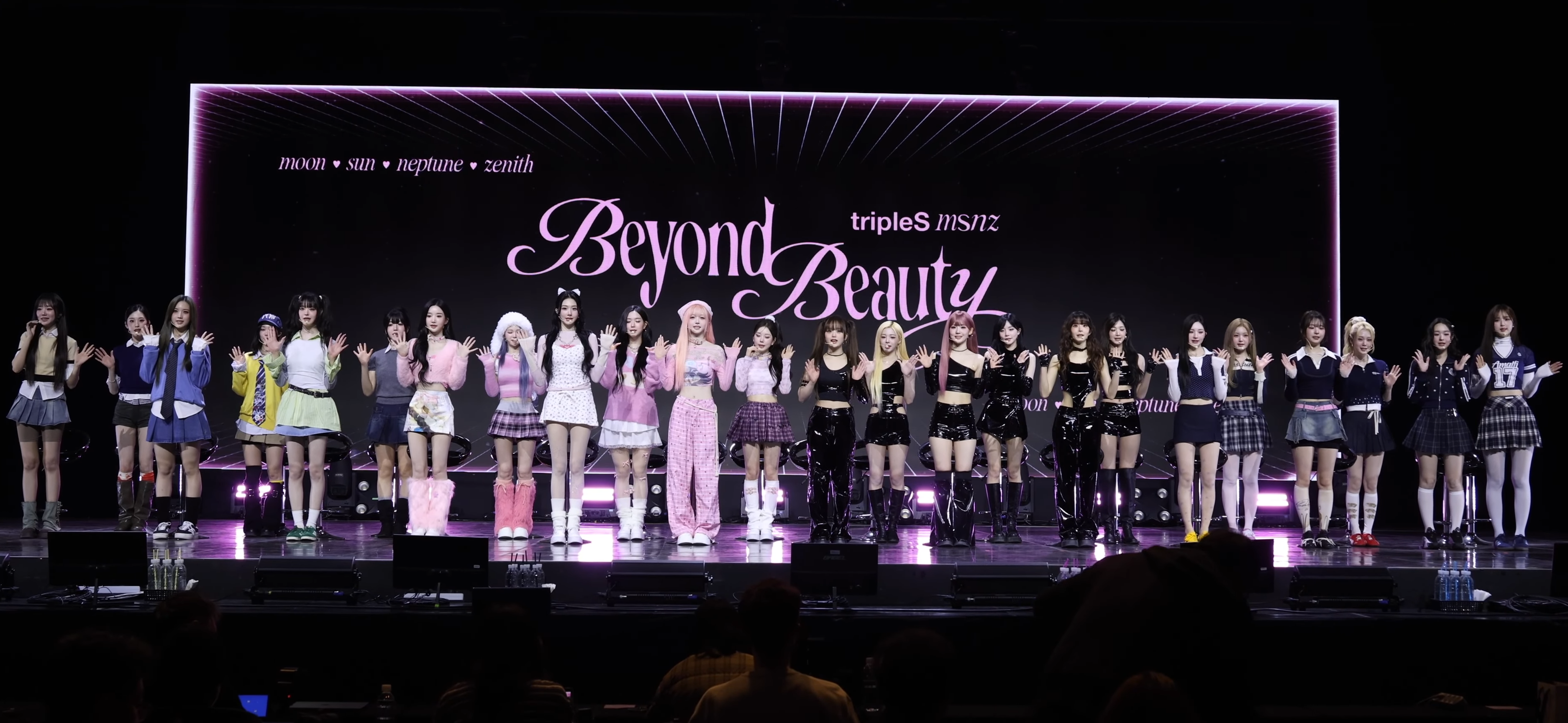
TripleS MSNZ at the Beyond Beauty album showcase

On May 12, 2025, TripleS released their second studio album as a full group, Assemble25, led by the title track "Are You Alive".

TripleS's eleventh sub-unit Alphie, and its eight members, were announced for the group's world tour "@%(Alpha Percent)", starting from nine cities in North America in September 2025, followed by Seoul on October 11 and 12, and Taipei on November 9 as the concluding stop.

On September 3, TripleS announced MSNZ, a project that would form four sub-units of six members each: Moon, Sun, Neptune, and Zenith (being the group's twelfth to fifteenth sub-units). The leaders of the sub-units were determined to be Sullin, Xinyu, Yoon Seo-yeon, and Jeong Ha-yeon respectively. Subsequently, through fan votes held from September 4 to 9, the lineups of the four sub-units were finalized. A second fan vote for the project was held from September 19 to 21, to determine each of the sub-unit's title tracks.

TripleS's official Japanese sub-unit Hatchi released their first EP SecretHimitsuBimil on October 1. The lead single of the album, titled "Password", was pre-released on September 17.

TripleS, as MSNZ, released the EP Beyond Beauty on November 24. The EP included the four title tracks from the four sub-units: "Cameo Love" by Moon, "Bubble Gum Girl" by Sun, "Fly Up" by Neptune, and "Q&A" by Zenith, plus a special track "Christmas Alone" performed by all 24 members.

=== 2026–present: Assemble26 ′Love & Pop′, new ballad sub-unit Aura ===
On January 26, 2026, TripleS announced Assemble26 ′Love & Pop′, whereby two full group releases would be made within 2026, one in the first half and one in the second half of the year. It was then announced on May 1 that Assemble26 ′Love & Pop′ would be released in three parts. The first part was released on June 1, led by the title track "Baby Flower". The second part, a single titled "Andless", was released on October 16. The third part, a Japanese release, would be released in January 2027.

On August 1, the sub-unit Moon released the Japanese digital single "Dream Dress", as a pre-release for the full group's upcoming first Japanese studio album Love & Pop Pt.3 in January 2027. This would be followed by the sub-units Sun, Neptune and Zenith releasing their Japanese digital singles on September 1, October 1 and November 1 respectively, also as pre-releases for Love & Pop Pt.3. The sub-unit Sun released the Japanese digital single "DNA (Dream N Access)" on September 1. The sub-unit Neptune released the Japanese digital single "Welcome to Heaven" on October 1. The sub-unit Zenith released the Japanese digital single "See You" on November 1.

On August 23, TripleS announced their second ballad sub-unit, after Aria. The sub-unit was formed through fan voting of three members to join Joobin, who was the pre-selected member for the sub-unit. In the Seoul stop of the group's 2026 world tour "Andless", the sub-unit, being the group's sixteenth sub-unit, was revealed to be named Aura, and performed the single "Dream Drip" for the first time.

TripleS performed the new single "I Want You To Know" for the first time in the Toronto stop of the group's 2026 world tour "Andless". The single, also as part of Love & Pop Pt.2, was officially released on November 13.

== Endorsements ==
On July 12, 2022, TripleS partnered with the convenience store GS25 to sell the group's exclusive photocards and collaboration set products. On November 30, 2022, TripleS became a promoter for the Korean fashion website Seoulstore. On May 12, 2025, members Kotone, Nien, Jeong Ha-yeon and SeoAh collaborated with Shiseido Professional's hair coloring product, ULTIST. On June 10, 2025, TripleS partnered with Korean sportswear company, Over the Pitch.

== Members ==
Adapted from the group's official website:

Name	Debut date	Country	Sub-units															
Name	Debut date	Country	AAA (Note: Stands for Acid Angel from Asia)	KRE (Note: Stands for Krystal Eyes)	AE (Note: Stands for Acid Eyes, collab of two sub-units: Acid Angel from Asia and Krystal Eyes)	Lovelution	Evolution	NXT	Aria	Glow	VV (Note: Stands for Visionary Vision, stylized as Vision@ry Vision)	Hatchi (Note: Japanese: ハッチ; stylized as ∞!)	Alphie	MSNZ (Note: Stands for Mi So Nyo Z (Korean: 미소녀즈); meaning "beautiful girlz", stylized in all lower caps)				Aura
Name	Debut date	Country	AAA	KRE	AE	Lovelution	Evolution	NXT	Aria	Glow	VV	Hatchi	Alphie	Moon	Sun	Neptune	Zenith	Aura
Jeong Hye-rin	October 28, 2022	South Korea									★							
Kim Yoo-yeon	October 28, 2022	South Korea	★				★											
Kim Na-kyoung	October 28, 2022	South Korea																
Gong Yu-bin	October 28, 2022	South Korea																
Yoon Seo-yeon	February 13, 2023	South Korea		★		★										★		
Lee Ji-woo	February 13, 2023	South Korea																
Kim Chae-yeon	February 13, 2023	South Korea																
Kim Soo-min	February 13, 2023	South Korea																
Kaede	February 13, 2023	Japan																
Seo Da-hyun	February 13, 2023	South Korea							★									
Nien	August 17, 2023	Taiwan, Vietnam																
Park So-hyun	August 17, 2023	South Korea																
Xinyu	August 17, 2023	China													★			
Kotone	October 11, 2023	Japan																
Kwak Yeon-ji	October 11, 2023	South Korea																
Mayu	October 11, 2023	Japan										★						
Lynn	December 23, 2023	Japan																
Joobin	December 23, 2023	South Korea																
Jeong Ha-yeon	December 23, 2023	South Korea															★	
Park Shi-on	December 23, 2023	South Korea						★										
Kim Chae-won	May 8, 2024	South Korea																
Sullin	May 8, 2024	Thailand												★				
Seoah	May 8, 2024	South Korea																
Jiyeon	May 8, 2024	South Korea								★								
			"★" denotes sub-unit leader															

== Discography ==
=== TripleS ===
- Assemble24 (2024)
- Assemble25 (2025)

=== Visionary Vision ===
- Performante (2024)

== Filmography ==
=== Web shows ===
Year	Title	Network	Notes	Ref.
2022-present	Signal	YouTube	Daily Vlogs	
2022	Convenience Store Honey Association	YouTube	GS25 promotional series	
2023	Strong Girl: Badge War	YouTube	Variety Show	
2024	Badge War 2: Girls Never Die	YouTube	Variety Show	
2025	Badge War 3: No Badge No Power	YouTube	Variety Show	
2026	Badge War 4: Trust No One	YouTube	Variety Show	

== Concerts ==
=== Concert tours ===
- TripleS 1st World Tour [Authentic] (2023) (Note: The sub-unit Lovelution participated in the North America leg, while the sub-unit Evolution participated in the Australia leg. The aforementioned sub-units, and the sub-unit NXT participated in the Seoul stop.)
- TripleS Come True (2025) (Note: Members Kim Na-kyoung, Seo Da-hyun, Nien, Yoon Seo-yeon, Sullin, Jeong Ha-yeon, Joobin and SeoAh participated in the tour.)
- TripleS A Live 25 (2025)
- TripleS Alphie Alpha Percent World Tour (2025) (Note: The sub-unit Alphie participated in the tour.)
- TripleS 2026 OT24 Concerts in Asia [My Secret New Zone] (2026)
- TripleS 2026 World Tour [Andless] (2026)

=== Standalone concerts ===
- TripleS: Pre-Con <Assemble> (2023) (Note: Members Kim Yoo-yeon, Kim Na-kyoung, Seo Da-hyun, Yoon Seo-yeon, Kim Chae-yeon, Gong Yu-bin, Lee Ji-woo, Kaede, Jeong Hye-rin and Kim Soo-min participated in the concert.)

=== Fan concerts ===
- Girls Never Stop (2024)
- Surfing Club 1st Generation Inauguration Ceremony (2025)

== Bibliography ==
=== Photobooks ===
Title	Release date	Publisher	Notes	Ref.
Yoon SeoYeon.SSS Atom01 [The Face]	October 23, 2022	Modhaus	Yoon Seo-yeon solo photobook	
Mayu (TripleS) - [TripleS Mayu Mini Photo Book]	July 19, 2024	Modhaus	Mayu solo photobook	

== Awards and nominations ==
Name of the award ceremony, year presented, award category, nominee(s) of the award, and the result of the nomination
Award ceremony	Year	Category	Nominee(s)/work(s)	Result	Ref.
Asian Pop Music Awards (Note: Hosted by the Hong Kong Asia Pacific International Group and Sunway Records, the Asian Pop Music Awards bases its winners on the "Asian Pop Music Chart" which opened in September 2019.)	2023	Best New Artist (Overseas)	Assemble	Nominated	
Brand of the Year Awards	2023	Rookie Female Idol	TripleS	Won	
D Awards	2025	Delights Blue Label	TripleS	Won	
D Awards	2025	Best Girl Group Popularity Award	TripleS	Won	
D Awards	2025	Discovery of the Year	TripleS	Won	
Hanteo Music Awards	2023	Rookie of the Year (Female)	TripleS	Won	
Hanteo Music Awards	2024	Global Rising Star	TripleS	Won	
Hanteo Music Awards	2024	Artist of the Year (Bonsang)	TripleS	Nominated	
Hanteo Music Awards	2024	Global Artist – Africa	TripleS	Nominated	
Hanteo Music Awards	2024	Global Artist – Asia	TripleS	Nominated	
Hanteo Music Awards	2024	Global Artist – Europe	TripleS	Nominated	
Hanteo Music Awards	2024	Global Artist – North America	TripleS	Nominated	
Hanteo Music Awards	2024	Global Artist – Oceania	TripleS	Nominated	
Hanteo Music Awards	2024	Global Artist – South America	TripleS	Nominated	
Hanteo Music Awards	2024	WhosFandom Award – Female	TripleS	Nominated	
Korea Best Brand Awards – Hallyu Entertainment Awards	2025	Asia Star – Girl Group	TripleS	Won	
Korean Music Awards	2025	Best K-pop Album	Assemble24	Nominated	
Korean Music Awards	2025	Best K-pop Song	"Girls Never Die"	Nominated	
MAMA Awards	2023	Best New Female Artist	TripleS	Won	
MAMA Awards	2023	Artist of the Year	TripleS	Nominated	
MAMA Awards	2023	Album of the Year	Assemble	Nominated	
Melon Music Awards	2024	1theK Global Icon	TripleS	Won	
Seoul Music Awards	2025	Main Prize (Bonsang)	TripleS	Nominated	
Seoul Music Awards	2025	Popularity Award	TripleS	Nominated	
Seoul Music Awards	2025	K-Wave Special Award	TripleS	Nominated	
Seoul Music Awards	2025	K-pop World Choice – Group	TripleS	Nominated	
