= Performante =

- Digital cover

Studio album by TripleS
- Released: October 23, 2024
- Recorded: 2024
- Genres: K-pop; hip hop; drum and bass; Jersey club
- Length: 24:47
- Languages: Korean; English
- Labels: Modhaus; Kakao

TripleS chronology
Assemble24 (2024)	Performante (2024)	Assemble25 (2025)

Singles from Performante
- 1. "Hit the Floor" Released: October 23, 2024

Performante is the debut album of the South Korean girl group Visionary Vision, a subunit of TripleS, and it also serves as the second studio album by TripleS. The subunit is composed of members Jeong Hye-rin, Kim Yoo-yeon, Kim Na-kyoung, Gong Yu-bin, Kaede, Kotone, Kwak Yeon-ji, Nien, Park So-hyun, Xinyu, Lynn, and Ji-yeon. It was released on October 23, 2024, by Modhaus and distributed by Kakao Entertainment. The album contains ten tracks, including the lead single, "Hit the Floor."

== Background and release ==
On June 14, 2024, TripleS announced a new 12-member sub-unit Visionary Vision (VV) which was slated to debut in the second half of the year. The unit was described as "dance-oriented" and was formed through fan voting of nine members and internal selection, which added one member alongside Gong Yu-bin and Lynn, who had been preselected by the company for the group. The final lineup for Visionary Vision was officially revealed on June 18.

On October 23, 2024, Visionary Vision debuted with the studio album Performante, containing ten tracks including the lead single "Hit The Floor".

== Composition and reception ==
Performante contains a total of ten tracks. The album's lead single, "Hit the Floor", is inspired by old-school hip-hop and contains both vocal and rap sections. Its lyrics aim to counteract social stigma involving how they should look and act.

We want to break the mold of what’s been done by female idols and prove that we can be whatever we want to be, so, we talked a lot about the difficulties that young girls endure. But with this album, we’re taking a step toward overcoming such difficulties and becoming independent women.

— Park So-hyun, a press conference for Korea JoongAng Daily.

Han Seong-hyeon, writing for IZM, gave Performante two-and-a-half stars out of five, praising it for its distinct concept but criticizing it for its childish lyrics and lack of cohesion.

== Track listing ==
Track listing for Performante
No.	Title	Lyrics	Music	Arrangement	Length
1.	"Visual Virtue"		GDLO; Moonkyo (MonoTree)	GDLO; Moonkyo (MonoTree)	0:49
2.	"Hit the Floor"	Jaden Jeong	GDLO; Moonkyo (MonoTree); C'SA	GDLO; Moonkyo (MonoTree)	3:07
3.	"Choom"	Jaden Jeong; 더논 (Dawnon); 임다이 (ImDAI); 백새임 (Baek Sae-im) (PNP); 김안나 (Kim An-na) (PNP); 윤예지 (Yoon Ye-ji) (PNP)	Lara Andersson; Daniel Kim; hymax	hymax	3:11
4.	"Éclair"	D’DAY; Jaden Jeong; Sunny Lee	KZ; Maria Marcus; MLC; 김태영 (Kim Taeyoung); DINT	KZ; 김태영 (Kim Taeyoung)	2:49
5.	"연애소설 (Love Soseol)"	Jaden Jeong; 진리 (Full8loom)	영광의얼굴들 (Full8loom); 진리 (Full8loom); 방건우 (Full8loom)	영광의얼굴들 (Full8loom); 방건우 (Full8loom)	02:58
6.	"Atmosphere (VV Ver.)"	Artronic Waves; yeon (AW:Crew); Yi See Bom	Atronic Waves	Atronic Waves	2:50
7.	"12 Rings"	이주형 (MonoTree)	이주형; GDLO (MonoTree); Reda	GDLO (MonoTree)	3:20
8.	"Vision"	Badd; Corbin; 권애진 (MonoTree); Ayushy (THE HUB); Frankie Day (THE HUB)	Badd; Corbin; 권애진 (MonoTree); Ayushy (THE HUB); Frankie Day (THE HUB)	Badd	2:32
9.	"Bionic Power"	Jaden Jeong; D’DAY	KZ; 김태영 (Kim Taeyoung); MLC; Maria Marcus; DINT	KZ; 김태영 (Kim Taeyoung)	3:26
10.	"Vision@ry Vision"		GDLO (MonoTree)	GDLO (MonoTree)	0:47
Total length:					24:47

== Charts ==
=== Weekly charts ===
Weekly chart performance for Performante
Chart (2024)	Peak position
South Korean Albums (Circle)	3

=== Monthly charts ===
Monthly chart performance for Performante
Chart (2024)	Position
South Korean Albums (Circle)	14

== Release history ==
Release history and formats for Performante
Region	Date	Format	Label
South Korea	October 23, 2024	CD; digital download; streaming	Modhaus; Kakao Entertainment
Various	October 23, 2024	Digital download; streaming	Modhaus; Kakao Entertainment
