= Kim Chae-yeon (singer) =

South Korean singer and actress (born 2004)

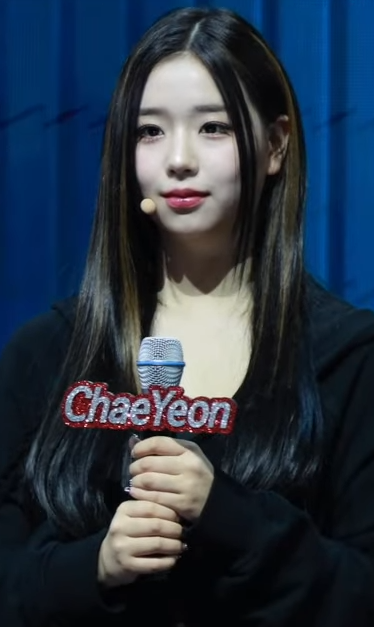
- Kim in May 2024
- Born: December 4, 2004 (age 21); Seoul, South Korea
- Education: Dongduk Women's University
- Occupations: Singer; actress
- Years active: 2008–present
- Musical career
- Genres: K-pop; dance-pop
- Instrument: Vocals
- Labels: Marbling E&M Inc.; JTG; YK Media Plus; Modhaus
- Member of: tripleS
- Formerly of: CutieL; Busters

Korean name
- Hangul: 김채연
- Hanja: 金采嬿
- RR: Gim Chaeyeon
- MR: Kim Ch'aeyŏn

Kim Chae-yeon (Korean: 김채연; born December 4, 2004) is a South Korean singer and actress. She is a member of the South Korean girl group tripleS and its sub-units, Krystal Eyes, Acid Eyes, Evolution, Aria, Hatchi and Sun.

She is a former member of South Korean girl groups CutieL and Busters. As an actress, Kim began her career by starring in the film Scandal Makers (2008).

== Early life ==
Kim Chae-yeon was born on December 4, 2004, in Mia-dong, Gangbuk District, Seoul, South Korea. Kim became interested in the entertainment industry since 10 years old. She was scouted by a child model street casting agent when she was in second grade of elementary school, around 7 or 8 years old. Her parents were initially doubtful but encouraged her to give it a try. After seeing herself on television, she decided she wanted to be a celebrity. She initially aspired to be a day-care teacher or a racing player.

== Career ==
=== 2008–2020: Early career beginnings, CutieL, debut with Busters ===
Kim began her acting career in 2008 in a supporting role in a South Korean film, Scandal Makers. In 2014, Kim became a member of the children's group 'CutieL' as a 2nd generation member. In 2017, all 2nd generation members departed from the group. She was announced to be a member of Busters when they were formed to promote Monstergram's upcoming TV series Idol Rangers Power Busters. She made her debut with the group's single album Dream On on November 27, 2017, In 2018, she auditioned to become the new MC of 'Tok! Tok! Boni Hani', she passed the first and final auditions and was selected as the official MC of the show. In 2020, Kim didn't participate in the Busters' Paeonia promotion cycle due to conflicting schedules caused by her MC position on 'Boni Hani'. On August 6, 2020, Kim left the group to continue acting and other activities. On July 21, 2021, Kim signed an exclusive contract with YK Media Plus, also effectively changing her stage name into her real name for promotional purposes.

=== 2022–present: Debut with tripleS ===
On June 16, 2022, it was reported that Kim would be re-debuting as a member of TripleS. On June 22, Kim was introduced as the fourth member of the group. In July 2022, Kim sung the original soundtrack for the animation series Armored Saurus Season 2. On September 16, 2022, TripleS announced they would be debuting their first two sub-units, with the members being voted by fans. On September 22, Kim became the third member announced as a member of the sub-unit Krystal Eyes.

On February 13, 2023, Kim alongside other first ten revealed members of TripleS, released the group' debut EP, Assemble, with the title track "Rising". Following with the debut of +(KR)ystal Eyes on May 4, 2023, with their mini album, 'Aesthetic'. On April 19, Kim threw a ceremonial first pitch at a Samsung Lions and Kiwoom Heroes baseball game. On April 20, TripleS announced their third and fourth sub-units, Kim was announced as the second member of Evolution on April 23. EVOLution debuted with their EP '<⟡> (MUJUK)' on October 11. On November 24, Kim was chosen as a member of the new ballad sub-unit, Aria. The sub-unit released their debut single album on January 15, 2024.

On May 8, 2024, Kim, alongside TripleS, released the group's first comeback, Assemble24. On August 27, she was revealed as a member of Hatchi, TripleS' subunit focusing on Japanese promotions. Subsequently, Kim, together with Hatchi, released the single album Untitled.

On May 12, 2025, Kim, alongside TripleS, released the group's second comeback, Assemble25. On September 8, she was revealed as a member of Sun.

On September 10, 2026, Kim launched her personal YouTube channel 13 Year Rookie Kim Chae-yeon.

== Endorsements ==
Kim has appeared in commercials for Pengtalk, Perfect Score Math Plus, Knights Chronicles and GS25. In 2019, she collaborated with Academy Sciences, launching a toy product called 'Creating a Creator' for children who want to be a one-man creator. In 2025, Kim became the advertising model for 'Dr Wonder'.

== Discography ==
=== Singles ===
Title	Year	Album
"Cherry 100%" (Note: Credited under tripleS but is a duet track performed by Kim Chae-yeon and Lee Ji-woo.)	2023	Aesthetic

=== Soundtrack appearances ===
List of soundtrack appearances, showing year released and album name
Title	Year	Peak chart positions	Album
Title	Year	KOR	Album
"MilkT Time" (밀크티 타임)	2019	—	MilkT OST
"We are the One"	2022	—	Armored Saurus: Season 2 OST
"—" denotes releases that did not chart or were not released in that region.

== Filmography ==
=== Film ===
Year	Title	Role	Notes	Ref.
2008	Scandal Makers	Bang Ah-ran	Guest role	
2014	Tazza: The Hidden Card	Kang Ah-yoon	Guest role	
2014	July 7	Weaver Girl	Main role	
2016	The World of Us	Kim Taeyeon	Supporting role	
2016	Split	Joo Heejin (young)	Guest role	
2017	A Day	Kim Hee-joo	Supporting role	
2017	Oh! My God Returns	Jin Han-ah	Supporting role	
2017	A Day When I Don't Want To Go To School	Kim Se-yeon	Guest role	
2023	Armored Saurus: Invasion of the Mechanical Dinosaur Empire	Joo-hee	Supporting role	

=== Television series ===
Year	Title	Role	Notes	Ref.
2013	Hur Jun, The Original Story	Butchers Daughter	Guest role	
2013	Ugly Alert	Gong Jin-joo's friend	Guest role	
2013	The Queen's Classroom	Ma Yeo-jin (young)	Guest role	
2015	Eollim	An Hye-kyung	Guest role	
2015	Madame Antoine: The Love Therapist	Seo Yeon-hee (young)	Supporting role	
2018	Love Alert	Seo Eun-byeol	Supporting role	
2019	My YouTube Diary	Hera / Queen Hera	Supporting role	
2021	Armored Saurus	Joo-hee	Supporting role	
2022	Armored Saurus: Season 2	Joo-hee	Supporting role	

=== Theater ===
Year	Title	Korean Title	Role	Ref.
2025	Solo Leveling on Ice	나 혼자만 레벨업 on ICE	Sung Jin-ah	

=== Web shows ===
Year	Title	Role	Ref.
2022	Dream Center Study Room	Cast Member	
2024	Kkondae Z	Cast Member	

=== Television shows ===
Year	Title	Role	Notes	Ref.
2018	Cooking Class	Cast Member	Episodes 145–192	
2019–2021	Talk! Talk! Boni Hani	Cast Member	Episodes 3766–4313	
2021	Quiz Monster	Cast Member	with Haha	

=== Hosting ===
Year	Title	Notes	Ref.
2018	K-Pop Model Contest	with Jung Min-gyu	

=== Radio ===
Year	Title	Role	Notes	Ref.
2024	Got7 Youngjae's Best Friend	Fixed Guest	September 1 – November 21	
