= Assemble25 =

- Digital cover

Studio album by TripleS
- Released: May 12, 2025
- Recorded: February 2025
- Length: 29:57
- Language: Korean
- Labels: Modhaus, Kakao

TripleS chronology
Performante (2024)	Assemble25 (2025)	SecretHimitsuBimil (2025)

Singles from Assemble25
- 1. "Are You Alive" Released: May 12, 2025

Professional ratings
Review scores
Source	Rating
IZM	2.5/5 stars

Assemble25 is the third studio album by South Korean girl group TripleS, and their second as a full group, following Assemble24. It was released on May 12, 2025 by Modhaus and distributed by Kakao Entertainment.

== Background ==
On the January 23, 2025 episode of TripleS' web show Signal, they announced their plan to release a studio album as a full group later that year. Concurrently, it was announced that a poll would be held for fans to vote for the album's title track among eight songs—"Stranger Things", "Worldwide Women", "Unlimiter", "Irony Icon", "Girls Be", "Lit Pop", "Light Up", and "Diablo". The voting began the following day, and the final result was unveiled on January 31, with "Stranger Things" winning the poll. A second poll was held the following day for fans to vote, to determine which of the remaining seven songs will be included in the album, with "Diablo" receiving the most votes.

On April 12, during a fan meeting event, TripleS announced the release date for Assemble25 to be on May 12. Pre-orders for the album began on April 21. On April 25, a teaser image was released, unveiling the title for the album's lead single, "Are You Alive" (깨어), which was retitled from "Stranger Things". The full track listing was released on May 2.

== Commercial performance ==
A week after the album's release, Modhaus reported a sale count of 516,626 copies, surpassing the first week sale count of 370,000 copies achieved by Visionary Vision's Performante, and making this TripleS' fastest-selling album to date. The album went on to debut at number 3 on the Circle Album Chart.

== Track listing ==
Track listing for Assemble25
No.	Title	Lyrics	Music	Arrangement	Length
1.	"@% (Alpha Percent)" (sung by Yoon Seo-yeon)	Jaden Jeong	Haring (MonoTree); Revin	Haring (MonoTree); Revin	1:03
2.	"Are You Alive" (깨어 (Kkaeeo, lit. "Wake Up"))	Jaden Jeong	Haring (MonoTree); Ikki; Kwon Ae-jin (MonoTree); Lyd	Haring (MonoTree)	3:07
3.	"Detective Soseol" (추리소설 (Churi soseol, lit. "Mystery Novel"))	Jinli (Full8loom); Jaden Jeong	Glory Face (Full8loom); Jinli (Full8loom); Keejun (Full8loom)	Glory Face (Full8loom); Keejun (Full8loom)	3:21
4.	"Firework Diary" (어제 우리 불꽃놀이 (Eoje uri bulkkotnol-i, lit. "Yesterday, We Had Fireworks"))	GDLO (MonoTree)	GDLO (MonoTree); Moonkyo (MonoTree); C’SA	Moonkyo (MonoTree); GDLO (MonoTree)	3:09
5.	"Love Child"	Jaden Jeong	Junhyuk; Luke (MonoTree); Arineh Karimi; BB Elliot	Junhyuk; Luke (MonoTree)	3:02
6.	"Persona"	Park So-hyun	Park So-hyun; Badd; Ikki; Nild (MonoTree); Frankie Day (The Hub); Awrii (The Hub); Hyun	Park So-hyun; Badd	3:03
7.	"Too Hot"	Jeong Il-kwon (MUMW); Muha (MUMW); Lee Bo-bae (MUMW); Kim Ru-ki (MUMW); Kim Ba-da (MUMW); Che-Che (MUMW); Chris (MUMW); Aran (MUMW); Hyun Yoo-wool (MUMW); Chae Ri-ha (MUMW); Doh Hwa-yoon (MUMW)	Didrik Thott; Andreas Öhrn; Hymax	Hymax	3:22
8.	"Diablo"	Park So-hyun; Jaden Jeong; D'Day	KZ; Honeysweat; Dint; MLC; Maria Marcus	Honeysweat	3:21
9.	"Friend Zone"	Artronic Waves; Hae Na-hyun (MUMW); Yeon (ARTiffect)	Artronic Waves; Mayday (AW:crew)	Artronic Waves; Mayday (AW:crew)	3:18
10.	"Love2Love"	MLC; Maria Marcus; Imsuho; Naasim; LuckyJang	Imsuho; Naasim; LuckyJang; MLC; Maria Marcus	LuckyJang; Naasim; Imsuho	3:11
Total length:					29:57

== Charts ==
=== Weekly charts ===
Weekly chart performance for Assemble25
Chart (2025)	Peak position
South Korean Albums (Circle)	3

=== Monthly charts ===
Monthly chart performance for Assemble25
Chart (2025)	Position
South Korean Albums (Circle)	8

=== Year-end charts ===
Year-end chart performance for Assemble25
Chart (2025)	Position
South Korean Albums (Circle)	57

== Certifications ==
Certifications for Assemble25
Region	Certification	Certified units/sales
South Korea (KMCA) Cosmo	Platinum	250,000^{^}
^{^} Shipments figures based on certification alone.

== Release history ==
Release history and formats for Assemble25
Region	Date	Format	Label
South Korea	May 12, 2025	CD	Modhaus, Kakao
Various	May 12, 2025	Digital download; streaming	Modhaus, Kakao
