= Assemble (EP) =

- Digital cover

EP by TripleS
- Released: February 13, 2023
- Genre: K-pop
- Length: 17:40
- Languages: Korean; English
- Labels: MODHAUS; Kakao

TripleS chronology
Access (2022)	Assemble (2023)	Aesthetic (2023)

Singles from Rising
- 1. "Rising" Released: February 13, 2023

Assemble (stylized in all caps) is the debut extended play by South Korean girl group TripleS consisting of members Yoon Seo-yeon, Jeong Hye-rin, Lee Ji-woo, Kim Chae-yeon, Kim Yoo-yeon, Kim Soo-min, Kim Na-kyoung, Gong Yu-bin, Kaede and Seo Da-hyun. It was released on February 13, 2023, by Modhaus and distributed by Kakao Entertainment. It is available in two versions and contains 7 tracks, with "Rising" as the lead single.

== Promotion and release ==
On November 28, 2022, it was announced that TripleS would begin to prepare for their debut with 10 members some time after the group's new member, Seo Da-hyun, was unveiled to the public. Fans had the opportunity to choose the title track of the EP through their official app, COSMO. Out of the 8 songs, song B won and became the main song for the 10-member debut EP Assemble, later titled "Rising".

On January 18, 2023, TripleS revealed that the EP would be released on February 13, followed with a concert at the Blue Square Mastercard Hall in South Korea.

== Track listing ==
No.	Title	Lyrics	Music	Length
1.	"Beam"	Maverick; Haeil	Fuxxy; Anymasingga; Alina Smith	2:38
2.	"Before the Rise" (sung by Kim Na-kyoung)		GDLO (MonoTree)	0:53
3.	"Rising"	Jaden Jeong; GDLO; Yelo (MonoTree); simple tea	GDLO; Yelo (MonoTree); Artronic Waves	2:39
4.	"Colorful"	Jeon Ji Eun; Jaden Jeong	Paulina "Pau" Cerrilla; Hymax	3:22
5.	"The Baddest"	G-High (MonoTree); Awry (The Hub); Shannon	G-High (MonoTree); Awry (The Hub); Shannon	3:35
6.	"New Look"	G-high (MonoTree); Jaden Jeong; Kella Armitage; GG Ramirez	BADD; G-high (MonoTree); Kella Armitage; GG Ramirez; Aejin Kwon (MonoTree)	3:28
7.	"Chowall" (sung by Yoon Seo-yeon and Kim Na-kyoung)	Jaden Jeong	BADD	1:03
Total length:				17:40

== Charts ==
=== Weekly charts ===
Weekly chart performance for Assemble
Chart (2023–2025)	Peak position
South Korean Albums (Circle)	6

=== Monthly charts ===
Monthly chart performance for Assemble
Chart (2023)	Peak position
South Korean Albums (Circle)	26

== Release history ==
Release history and formats for Access
Region	Date	Format	Label
Various	February 13, 2023	Digital download; streaming	Modhaus
South Korea	February 13, 2023	Digital download; streaming	Modhaus
South Korea	February 13, 2023	CD	Modhaus; Kakao
