= Assemble24 =

- Digital cover

Studio album by TripleS
- Released: May 8, 2024
- Recorded: February 2024
- Length: 28:16
- Languages: Korean; English
- Labels: Modhaus; Kakao

TripleS chronology
Structure of Sadness (2024)	Assemble24 (2024)	Performante (2024)

Singles from Assemble24
- 1. "Girls Never Die" Released: May 8, 2024

Assemble24 is the first studio album by South Korean girl group TripleS, their first release as a full group. (Note: The full lineup consists of Yoon Seo-yeon, Jeong Hye-rin, Lee Ji-woo, Kim Chae-yeon, Kim Yoo-yeon, Kim Soo-min, Kim Na-kyoung, Gong Yu-bin, Kaede, Seo Da-hyun, Kotone, Kwak Yeon-ji, Nien, Park So-hyun, Xinyu, Mayu, Lynn, Joobin, Jeong Ha-yeon, Park Shi-on, Kim Chae-won, Sullin, Seo-ah, and Ji-yeon.) It was released on May 8, 2024 via Modhaus and distributed by Kakao Entertainment. It contains ten tracks, including the lead single "Girls Never Die".

== Background and release ==
On February 3 and 4, 2024, TripleS held their "tripleS Authentic in Seoul" concert. The first day featured performances by two sub-units, Lovelution and Evolution. The second day featured all 20 members that had been introduced. TripleS also announced in the concert that the full group composed of 24 members will debut with "Assemble24".

On April 1, 2024, TripleS announced their final four members, started with the 21st member Kim Chae-won. This was followed with the introduction of the group's 22nd, 23rd and 24th members Sullin, Seoah, and Jiyeon to complete the group's full line-up. The four members aforementioned would be under one of the group's new unit Glow, for potential future activities.

TripleS made their full team debut with the first studio album Assemble24 on May 8, 2024. The album contains ten tracks with the lead single "Girls Never Die". The full group took their first music show win on May 14, 2024, through The Show.

== Composition and lyrics ==
"S", an introductory track, blends pop metal guitar and R&B-pop. The title track "Girls Never Die" delivers "early 2000s dance grooves" with synth and bass. It describes persevering through struggle, and viewing it as chances to grow and value experiences. "Heart Raider" has a liquid garage beat and tells the story of a crush on a friend. "Midnight Flower" is bubbly pop rock song with a foundation of beats and guitars reminiscent of the 1980s. "White Soul Sneakers" is an afrobeat and acid funk song. "Chiyu" is a simple, mellow track. "24", the follow up to the earlier TripleS track "Rising", has "the members hyping themselves up". "Dimension" is arranged in a new jack swing style. Overall, Assemble24 lyrically contains floral imagery, using it as a symbol of strength and also of TripleS.

== Critical reception ==
Professional ratings
Review scores
Source	Rating
IZM	4/5 stars
NME	4/5 stars
Sputnikmusic	4/5 stars

Following its release, music critics gave Assemble24 positive reviews. It received praise for its diverse range in genre, which Han Seong-hyeon, writing for IZM, expressed as TripleS bringing "music from all over the world to the center of Seoul". Raul Stanciu of Sputnikmusic described it as a "successful blend" of their previous music, observing some similarity to Loona in the "bubbly, retro futuristic synth pop with occasional RnB type vocals". Rhian Daly, writing for NME, characterized Assemble24 as "wide-ranging yet cohesive" with each track designed to fit TripleS. It also received praise for its themes of strength and unity.

== Accolades ==
=== Listicles ===
Name of publisher, year listed, name of listicle, and placement
Publisher	Year	Listicle	Placement	Ref.
Billboard	2024	The 20 Best K-Pop Albums of 2024 (So Far): Staff Picks	8th	
Billboard	2024	The 25 Best K-Pop Albums of 2024: Staff Picks	6th	
Idology	2024	16 Best Albums of 2024	Placed	

== Track listing ==
Track listing for Assemble24
No.	Title	Lyrics	Music	Arrangement	Length
1.	"S" (sung by Yoon Seo-yeon, Nien and Xinyu)	Jaden Jeong	El Capitxn; Vendors (Arte); Vendors (Nano); Jongsoo Kim	El Capitxn; Vendors (Arte); Vendors (Nano)	1:13
2.	"Girls Never Die"	Jaden Jeong	El Capitxn; Maria Marcus; Arineh Karimi; Vendors (Zenur); Vendors (Nano); Vendors (Coll!n); Vendors (JNX's); Jongsoo Kim	El Capitxn; Vendors (Arte); Vendors (Nano)	3:07
3.	"가시권 (Heart Raider)"	Youra (Full8loom); Jinli (Full8loom); Moon Yeon (Full8loom)	Glory Face (Full8loom); Bang Gun-woo (Full8loom); Davey Nate; Ryan Kim; Jayna Brown	Glory Face (Full8loom); Bang Gun-woo (Full8loom)	2:59
4.	"Midnight Flower"	Kim Nakyoung; Hollin (MonoTree); 329; Kang Gyu-rin	Yoon Jong-sung (MonoTree); Denzel Chain; Chanti	Yoon Jong-sung (MonoTree)	2:46
5.	"White Soul Sneakers"	Park Sohyun	Park Sohyun; Badd; San Yoon; Louise Frick Sveen	Park Sohyun; Badd	3:03
6.	"치유 (Chiyu)"	D'Day; Jaden Jeong	KZ; Kim Tae-yeong; MLC; Maria Marcus; Dint	KZ; Kim Tae-yeong	2:50
7.	"24"	GDLO; Yelo; Moonkyo (MonoTree); Ikki	GDLO; Yelo; Ikki	GDLO; Moonkyo (MonoTree)	2:33
8.	"이면의 이면 (Beyond the Beyond)"	Park Sohyun; Hyang (MUMW); Borang (MUMW); Jeon Hyun-ji (MUMW); Jaden Jeong	Badd; San Yoon; Louise Frick Sveen	Badd	3:02
9.	"Non Scale"	Jinli (Full8loom); Jaden Jeong	Glory Face (Full8loom); Jinli (Full8loom)	Glory Face (Full8loom)	3:26
10.	"Dimension"	Lee Yi-jin; Jaden Jeong; Choi Young-kyoung	Badd; San Yoon; Isa Guerra	Badd	3:17
Total length:					28:16

== Charts ==
=== Weekly charts ===
Weekly chart performance for Assemble24
Chart (2024)	Peak position
South Korean Albums (Circle)	3

=== Monthly charts ===
Monthly chart performance for Assemble24
Chart (2024)	Position
South Korean Albums (Circle)	14

== Release history ==
Release history and formats for Assemble24
Region	Date	Format	Label
South Korea	May 8, 2024	CD; digital download; streaming	Modhaus; Kakao Entertainment
Various	May 8, 2024	Digital download; streaming	Modhaus; Kakao Entertainment
