= List of Boys II Planet contestants =

Boys II Planet is a South Korean reality competition series, where trainees from around the world, primarily South Korea, Great China, Japan, Thailand, the United States, and various other countries, competed to debut in an eight-member boy group. The 160 contestants were initially divided into two planets: Planet K featuring Korean contestants, and Planet C primarily featuring contestants from Greater China, with each consisting of 80 individuals. The two merged after the first two episodes of each series. They then battled for the opportunity to debut in the final group, Alpha Drive One.

== Contestants ==
The English names of contestants are presented in Eastern order in accordance with the official website.

The ages of all contestants are presented in accordance with the international age system as of Episode 1 of the K program (July 17, 2025).

Color key

Final members of Alpha Drive One
Contestant was eliminated in the final episode
Contestant was eliminated at the Third Survival Announcement
Contestant was eliminated at the Second Survival Announcement
Contestant was eliminated at the First Survival Announcement
Contestant was eliminated in the Signal Song Test
Contestant was eliminated in the Class Placement Match
Contestant left the show
Top 8

List of Boys II Planet contestants
Company	Contestant	Age (Note: As of Episode 1 (July 17, 2025), added new age if contestant is still in the show during their birthday)	Rating/Ranking																													
Company	Contestant	Age	Ep. 1		Ep. 2		Ep. 3		Ep. 3/4	Episode 5						Ep. 6	Ep. 6/7		Episode 8					Ep. 9	Episode 10					Episode 11		Final
Company	Contestant	Age	Class (Note: From Class Placement Match)	# (Note: 1st K/C Vote Interim Status)	#	Class (Note: From Signal Song Test)	# (Note: Rank given by the masters)	# (Note: Second Global Vote Interim Status)	# (Note: From 1vs1 Class Battle points)	Votes			Points	# (Note: 1st K/C Vote + 2nd Global Vote + Benefit Points 1 + 1st Live Vote Result)	Class (Note: From 1st Survival Announcement)	# (Note: Third Global Vote Interim Status)	# (Note: From Class Takeover Position Battle points)	Class	Votes		Points	# (Note: 3rd Global Vote + Benefit Points 2 + 2nd Live Vote Result)	Class (Note: From 2nd Survival Announcement)	# (Note: From Debut Concept Battle points)	Votes		Points	# (Note: 4th Global Vote + Benefit Points 3 + 3rd Live Vote Result)	Class (Note: From 3rd Survival Announcement)	Points	#	Final
Company	Contestant	Age	Class	#	#	Class	#	#	#	1st K/C Vote	2nd Global Vote		Points	#	Class	#	#	Class	3rd Global Vote		Points	#	Class	#	4th Global Vote		Points	#	Class	Points	#	Final
Company	Contestant	Age	Class	#	#	Class	#	#	#	1st K/C Vote	Korean	Global	Points	#	Class	#	#	Class	Korean	Global	Points	#	Class	#	Korean	Global	Points	#	Class	Points	#	Final
K-Program (South Korea)
GRID Entertainment (그리드엔터테인먼트)	Lee Sang-won (이상원)	22	3/3 stars	K1	K1	3/3 stars	2	1	12	2,526,097	1,111,304	3,838,888	12,497,772	1	3/3 stars	Not Shown	6	3/3 stars	1,168,785	5,356,077	12,617,136	1	3/3 stars	4	707,521	3,424,312	8,287,830	1	3/3 stars	7,293,777	1	1
Individual Trainee (개인연습생)	Kim Geon-woo (김건우)	22	3/3 stars	K7	K9	3/3 stars	5	17	22	941,392	323,370	845,366	3,562,704	16	3/3 stars	Not Shown	11	3/3 stars	749,980	1,685,086	6,011,169	7	3/3 stars	7	342,695	904,554	3,096,619	4	3/3 stars	4,854,331	4	4
GRID Entertainment (그리드엔터테인먼트)	Lee Leo (이리오)	22-23	3/3 stars	K5	K2	3/3 stars	6	5	38	1,715,851	574,084	2,552,121	7,650,903	5	3/3 stars	Not Shown	43	2/3 stars	680,040	3,680,248	7,935,026	3	3/3 stars	22	269,293	2,011,547	4,070,925	3	3/3 stars	4,147,134	6	6
Wake One Entertainment (웨이크원)	Chung Sang-hyeon (정상현)	17-18	2/3 stars	K3	K6	1/3 stars	58	4	10	1,485,862	1,020,169	1,376,357	8,071,897	3	3/3 stars	Not Shown	18	3/3 stars	882,350	1,393,265	6,235,782	6	3/3 stars	8	369,706	683,912	2,805,144	8	3/3 stars	3,862,466	7	7
OUI Entertainment (위엔터테인먼트)	Kim Jun-seo (김준서) (Note: Kim Jun-seo is a member of WEi and a former member of 1the9.) (Note: Bang Jun-hyuk and Kim Jun-seo were contestants on Under Nineteen.)	23	2/3 stars	K8	K8	3/3 stars	10	6	43	1,008,541	811,172	2,447,917	7,936,328	4	3/3 stars	Not Shown	13	3/3 stars	549,744	3,079,870	6,746,629	5	3/3 stars	24	125,184	1,757,254	2,829,642	7	3/3 stars	3,856,677	8	8
Jellyfish Entertainment (젤리피쉬)	Yoo Kang-min (유강민) (Note: Jo Gye-hyeon, Lee Dong-heon, and Yoo Kang-min are members of Verivery.)	22	3/3 stars	K2	K3	3/3 stars	4	7	56	1,694,264	521,380	1,897,650	6,550,521	7	3/3 stars	9	39	2/3 stars	548,385	1,986,832	5,163,207	8	3/3 stars	1	271,923	964,458	2,631,753	11	3/3 stars	3,548,388	9	9
FNC Entertainment	Chuei Li-yu (최립우)	21	1/3 stars	K4	K4	1/3 stars	55	3	47	1,662,951	868,085	1,370,271	7,569,231	6	3/3 stars	10	26	2/3 stars	610,151	1,392,895	4,764,725	10	3/3 stars	9	310,959	807,727	2,645,855	10	3/3 stars	3,284,175	10	10
Grigo Entertainment (그리고 엔터테인먼트)	Yumeki (Note: Full Name: Takenaka Yumeki (竹中夢生)) (유메키) (Note: Yumeki was a dance trainer on Produce 101 Japan The Girls and a contestant on Street Man Fighter.)	25	1/3 stars	K10	K11	3/3 stars	1	14	74	919,959	142,810	1,370,046	3,421,769	17	3/3 stars	Not Shown	48	2/3 stars	111,514	1,457,297	2,376,679	22	3/3 stars	10	120,520	1,739,714	2,783,273	9	3/3 stars	2,749,632	11	11
C-JeS Studios (씨제스엔터테인먼트)	Jun Lee-jeong (전이정) (Note: Jun Lee-jeong, Kim Jun-min, and Muhn Won-jun are members of Whib.)	21-22	2/3 stars	K18	K24	1/3 stars	49	34	15	286,080	298,314	450,857	2,486,764	23	3/3 stars	Not Shown	5	3/3 stars	580,242	1,062,120	4,352,964	12	3/3 stars	19	284,678	683,692	2,516,524	15	3/3 stars	2,474,319	12	12
C-JeS Studios (씨제스엔터테인먼트)	Kim Jun-min (김준민)	22	3/3 stars	K17	K21	3/3 stars	15	36	6	302,213	137,163	859,860	2,119,619	27	2/3 stars	Not Shown	20	3/3 stars	438,954	1,709,480	4,482,934	11	3/3 stars	3	285,873	859,236	2,576,158	13	3/3 stars	2,424,154	13	13
IST Entertainment (아이에스티)	Park Dong-gyu (박동규)	20	3/3 stars	K28	K14	3/3 stars	11	30	50	496,802	138,040	577,174	1,952,689	29	2/3 stars	Not Shown	14	3/3 stars	194,905	829,179	2,190,056 (Note: Park Dong-gyu, Fan Zheyi, and Han Harry June all got an extra set of votes to determine the 24th place contestant: Park Dong-gyu: 490,002, Total: 2,680,058; Fan Zheyi: 367,386, Total: 2,652,651; Han Harry June: 295,623, Total: 2,491,580)	24	3/3 stars	5	337,540	630,506	2,568,600	14	3/3 stars	1,862,464	15	15
Individual Trainee (개인연습생)	Kang Woo-jin (강우진)	18	3/3 stars	K25	K5	1/3 stars	61	9	11	1,534,862	243,346	1,590,665	4,965,995	10	3/3 stars	Not Shown	45	2/3 stars	254,983	1,496,041	3,121,531	16	3/3 stars	11	175,221	1,225,463	2,440,024	16	3/3 stars	1,823,699	16	16
iNKODE Entertainment (인코드 엔터테인먼트)	Masato (Note: Full Name: Aoyagi Masato (青柳 真人)) (마사토)	21	2/3 stars	K6	K7	2/3 stars	34	8	2	1,149,060	696,503	1,663,655	6,476,533	8	3/3 stars	8	32	2/3 stars	544,047	1,967,221	5,117,459	9	3/3 stars	16	244,332	905,307	2,412,413	17	3/3 stars	Eliminated		17
ES Nation (이스네이션)	Jang Han-eum (장한음) (Note: Jang Han-eum and Yoon Min were contestants on Vocal Showdown.)	20	2/3 stars	K12	K17	1/3 stars	53	19	32	395,865	644,234	231,949	3,841,826	12	3/3 stars	Not Shown	1	3/3 stars	694,494	295,655	3,991,799	14	3/3 stars	6	360,816	285,932	2,267,597	18	3/3 stars	Eliminated		18
iNKODE Entertainment (인코드 엔터테인먼트)	Park Jun-il (박준일)	21	2/3 stars	K13	K16	2/3 stars	44	33	3	405,124	125,907	490,990	1,696,009	35	2/3 stars	Not Shown	7	3/3 stars	449,730	1,255,296	4,013,108	13	3/3 stars	23	Not Shown		1,145,306	21	3/3 stars	Eliminated		21
Cube Entertainment (큐브엔터테인먼트)	Na Yun-seo (나윤서) (Note: Kim Dong-hyun B, Na Yun-seo, and Yoon Min were contestants on Loud.)	15	2/3 stars	K39	K19	3/3 stars	12	29	42	366,005	317,972	749,759	2,739,890	22	3/3 stars	Not Shown	3	3/3 stars	314,849	682,677	2,587,433	20	3/3 stars	21	Not Shown		1,084,476	22	3/3 stars	Eliminated		22
Wake One Entertainment (웨이크원)	Hsu Ching-yu (쉬칭위)	15-16	3/3 stars	K24	K10	3/3 stars	9	13	58	961,297	206,338	1,349,857	3,717,670	14	3/3 stars	Not Shown	33	2/3 stars	183,666	1,247,667	2,462,672	21	3/3 stars	17	Not Shown		1,041,886	23	3/3 stars	Eliminated		23
Brave Entertainment (브레이브 엔터테인먼트)	Han Harry June (한해리준) (Note: Han Harry-June and Yang Heui-chan are members of DKB.) (Note: Han Harry June was a contestant on Be Mbitious.)	21	3/3 stars	K33	K34	2/3 stars	26	47	49	130,173	34,924	242,571	698,005	47	2/3 stars	24	22	2/3 stars	187,289	1,021,973	2,195,957	26	2/3 stars	Eliminated								26
Cube Entertainment (큐브엔터테인먼트)	Kim Jae-hyun (김재현)	15	2/3 stars	K54	K18	1/3 stars	50	31	40	399,082	226,313	333,812	1,830,383	33	2/3 stars	27	4	3/3 stars	Not Shown			27	2/3 stars	Eliminated								27
howtouse (하우투유즈)	Yoon Min (윤민)	24	3/3 stars	K32	K38	3/3 stars	13	49	51	93,994	44,186	222,500	676,801 (Note: Yoon Min, Lee Dong-heon, Bang Jun-hyuk, and Zhang Shunyu all got an extra set of votes to determine the 48th place contestant: Yoon Min: 198,730, Total: 875,531; Lee Dong-heon: 196,338, Total: 844,686; Bang Jun-hyuk: 123,660, Total: 773,795; Zhang Shunyu: 81,016, Total: 729,303)	48	2/3 stars	Not Shown	8	3/3 stars	Not Shown			30	2/3 stars	Eliminated								30
IST Entertainment (아이에스티)	Arctic (Note: Full Name: Peerawat Traiphukdee (พีรวัส ทรัพย์สุขดี)) (아틱)	16	3/3 stars	K36	K31	1/3 stars	66	50	37	142,926	23,593	159,206	752,943	45	2/3 stars	Not Shown	19	3/3 stars	Not Shown			33	2/3 stars	Eliminated								33
Big Planet Made; Entertainment (빅플래닛메이드엔터)	Kim In-hu (김인후)	20	2/3 stars	K34	K39	3/3 stars	23	54	9	90,409	71,149	193,100	754,333	44	2/3 stars	Not Shown	23	3/3 stars	Not Shown			36	2/3 stars	Eliminated								36
Jellyfish Entertainment (젤리피쉬)	Jo Gye-hyeon (조계현)	26	3/3 stars	K19	K20	3/3 stars	14	40	25	315,115	102,346	171,526	1,088,978	40	2/3 stars	Not Shown	10	3/3 stars	Not Shown			37	2/3 stars	Eliminated								37
Wake One Entertainment (웨이크원)	Tatsuki (Note: Full Name: Kuronuma Tatsuki (黒沼達月)) (타츠키)	16	2/3 stars	K15	K23	2/3 stars	33	41	8	285,842	81,950	319,207	1,160,487	38	2/3 stars	Not Shown	30	2/3 stars	Not Shown			38	2/3 stars	Eliminated								38
Individual Trainee (개인연습생)	Seo Won (서원) (Note: Seo Won is a former member of NINE.i and was a contestant on Boys Planet and Dancing High.)	24	2/3 stars	K9	K12	3/3 stars	19	20	7	798,526	233,841	651,328	2,773,500	20	3/3 stars	Not Shown	38	2/3 stars	Not Shown			39	2/3 stars	Eliminated								39
ChoCo Entertainment (초코엔터테인먼트)	Yeom Ye-chan (염예찬) (Note: Yeom Ye-chan was a contestant on Project 7.)	16-17	3/3 stars	K31	K15	2/3 stars	40	35	72	434,273	44,976	387,462	1,133,796	39	2/3 stars	Not Shown	2	3/3 stars	Not Shown			40	2/3 stars	Eliminated								40
Woollim Entertainment (울림 엔터테인먼트)	Kim Dong-yun (김동윤) (Note: Kim Dong-yun and Lee Hyeop are members of Drippin and were contestants on Produce X 101.)	23	1/3 stars	K14	K22	2/3 stars	39	38	35	285,462	97,484	357,439	1,178,152	37	2/3 stars	Not Shown	12	2/3 stars	Not Shown			43	2/3 stars	Eliminated								43
ChoCo Entertainment (초코엔터테인먼트)	Kim Tae-jo (김태조)	15	3/3 stars	K53	K25	3/3 stars	22	39	39	270,284	60,721	275,306	894,396	42	2/3 stars	47	29	2/3 stars	Not Shown			45	2/3 stars	Eliminated								45
Nouer Entertainment (누아 엔터테인먼트)	Jung Hyun-jun (정현준) (Note: Jung Hyun-jun was a contestant on Make Mate 1.)	16	3/3 stars	K41	K47	3/3 stars	7	42	33	81,500	68,819	534,995	1,077,054	41	2/3 stars	Not Shown	46	2/3 stars	Not Shown			47	2/3 stars	Eliminated								47
IST Entertainment (아이에스티)	Kim Si-hwan (김시환)	19	3/3 stars	K27	K29	3/3 stars	20	46	20	166,586	49,023	214,000	759,775	43	2/3 stars	48	42	2/3 stars	Not Shown			48	2/3 stars	Eliminated								48
Jellyfish Entertainment (젤리피쉬)	Lee Dong-heon (이동헌)	29-30	3/3 stars	K29	K28	2/3 stars	37	45	14	178,642	48,415	120,546	648,348	49	1/3 stars	Eliminated																49
TOP Media (티오피미디어)	Bang Jun-hyuk (방준혁) (Note: Bang Jun-hyuk, Noh Hui-jun, and Song Min-jae are members of MCND.)	20	1/3 stars	K21	K27	1/3 stars	79	44	64	184,088	38,581	228,691	650,135	50	1/3 stars	Eliminated																50
P Nation (피네이션)	Kim Dong-hyun B (김동현 B)	16	3/3 stars	K62	K60	1/3 stars	54	71	57	Not Shown				53	1/3 stars	Eliminated																53
Bill Entertainment (빌엔터테인먼트)	Andrew (Note: Full Name: Han Andrew (한앤드류)) (앤드류)	21	2/3 stars	K40	K40	2/3 stars	27	55	24	Not Shown				54	1/3 stars	Eliminated																54
TOP Media (티오피미디어)	Song Min-jae (송민재)	21	2/3 stars	K30	K37	1/3 stars	78	58	16	Not Shown				55	1/3 stars	Eliminated																55
Brave Entertainment (브레이브 엔터테인먼트)	Yang Heui-chan (양희찬) (Note: Yang Heui-chan was a contestant on Boys24.)	25-26	3/3 stars	K52	K50	2/3 stars	41	61	17	Not Shown				57	1/3 stars	Eliminated																57
Wake One Entertainment (웨이크원)	Reeonn (Note: Full Name: Natpharit Chokrussameesiri (ณัฐฐ์พฤทธ์ โชครัศมีศิริ)) (리온)	18	1/3 stars	K50	K45	2/3 stars	35	64	4	Not Shown				58	1/3 stars	Eliminated																58
Jellyfish Entertainment (젤리피쉬)	Kim Daniel (김다니엘)	21	1/3 stars	K23	K32	1/3 stars	67	53	44	Not Shown				59	1/3 stars	Eliminated																59
n.CH Entertainment (n.CH엔터테인먼트)	Ham Hyun-seo (함현서)	18	1/3 stars	K68	K67	1/3 stars	51	80	59	Not Shown				60	1/3 stars	Eliminated																60
With US Entertainment (위드어스 엔터테인먼트)	Oh Jun-ho (오준호)	20	1/3 stars	K65	K65	2/3 stars	48	70	1	Not Shown				61	1/3 stars	Eliminated																61
C-JeS Studios (씨제스엔터테인먼트)	Muhn Won-jun (문원준)	19	2/3 stars	K43	K51	2/3 stars	29	69	21	Not Shown				62	1/3 stars	Eliminated																62
Individual Trainee (개인연습생)	Kim Dong-hyun A (김동현 A)	21	2/3 stars	K61	K64	1/3 stars	65	75	23	Not Shown				66	1/3 stars	Eliminated																66
Big Planet Made; Entertainment (빅플래닛메이드엔터)	Aoshi (Note: Full Name: Miyaji Aoshi (宮地 蒼紫)) (아오시)	16	1/3 stars	K35	K44	2/3 stars	42	60	62	Not Shown				67	1/3 stars	Eliminated																67
IST Entertainment (아이에스티)	Rensho (Note: Full Name: Aoki Rensho (青木錬昌)) (렌쇼)	17	3/3 stars	K44	K36	1/3 stars	75	57	18	Not Shown				68	1/3 stars	Eliminated																68
P Nation (피네이션)	Yusen (Note: Full Name: Chin Yu-sheng (金淯生) Korean Full Name: Kim Yu-seong (김유성)) (유센)	17	2/3 stars	K48	K52	2/3 stars	43	65	61	Not Shown				69	1/3 stars	Eliminated																69
RBW	Yang Da-wit (양다윗)	17	2/3 stars	K55	K63	1/3 stars	72	76	68	Not Shown				71	1/3 stars	Eliminated																71
Jellyfish Entertainment (젤리피쉬)	Kim Young-jun (김영준)	15	1/3 stars	K58	K59	1/3 stars	52	79	66	Not Shown				73	1/3 stars	Eliminated																73
n.CH Entertainment (n.CH엔터테인먼트)	Sho (Note: Full Name: Kuri Sho (くりしょう)) (쇼우)	19	1/3 stars	K37	K49	1/3 stars	77	66	45	Not Shown				74	1/3 stars	Eliminated																74
Jellyfish Entertainment (젤리피쉬)	Kim Hyeon-seo (김현서)	17-18	1/3 stars	K63	K66	1/3 stars	73	78	79	Not Shown				75	1/3 stars	Eliminated																75
TOP Media (티오피미디어)	Noh Hui-jun (노휘준)	21	2/3 stars	K46	K46	3/3 stars	24	67	48	Not Shown				77	1/3 stars	Eliminated																77
Woollim Entertainment (울림 엔터테인먼트)	Lee Seung-baek (이승백)	14	1/3 stars	K49	K54	1/3 stars	69	73	71	Not Shown				79	1/3 stars	Eliminated																79
iNKODE Entertainment (인코드 엔터테인먼트)	Jang Tae-yoon (장태윤)	18-19	2/3 stars	K67	K62	2/3 stars	32	72	80	Not Shown				80	1/3 stars	Eliminated																80
Woollim Entertainment (울림 엔터테인먼트)	Lee Hyeop (이협)	25	2/3 stars	K11	K13	0/3 stars	Eliminated																									84
Individual Trainee (개인연습생)	Lee Won-woo (이원우)	19	1/3 stars	K16	K26	0/3 stars	Eliminated																									89
STARON Entertainment (스타온 엔터테인먼트)	Heo Ji-o (허지오)	18	1/3 stars	K20	K30	0/3 stars	Eliminated																									92
Bill Entertainment (빌엔터테인먼트)	Taichi (Note: Full Name: Inagaki Taichi (稲垣 太地)) (타이치) (Note: Taichi was a contestant on Nizi Project Season 2.)	20	1/3 stars	K22	K33	0/3 stars	Eliminated																									95
Individual Trainee (개인연습생)	Tomoya (Note: Full Name: Kisou Tomoya (木曽友也)) (토모야)	21	1/3 stars	K26	K35	0/3 stars	Eliminated																									97
FNC Entertainment	Kenshiro (Note: Full Name: Watanabe Kenshiro (渡辺謙四郎)) (켄시로)	21	1/3 stars	K38	K41	0/3 stars	Eliminated																									102
Great M Entertainment (그레이트엠 엔터테인먼트)	Lee Yoon-chan (이윤찬)	19	1/3 stars	K45	K42	0/3 stars	Eliminated																									104
WAYF	Ryan (라이언)	19	2/3 stars	K47	K43	0/3 stars	Eliminated																									106
Wuzo Entertainement (우조엔터테인먼트)	Chris (Note: Full Name: Chris Han (크리스 한) Korean Full Name: Han Jong-myung (한종명)) (크리스) (Note: Chris is a member of Blitzers.)	22	1/3 stars	K42	K48	0/3 stars	Eliminated																									110
Wake One Entertainment (웨이크원)	Hwang Sun-woo (황선우)	15	1/3 stars	K64	K53	0/3 stars	Eliminated																									115
Wake One Entertainment (웨이크원)	Shoya (Note: Full Name: Sakazaki Shoya (坂崎翔屋)) (쇼야)	17	2/3 stars	K51	K55	0/3 stars	Eliminated																									117
Wake One Entertainment (웨이크원)	Justin (저스틴)	18	1/3 stars	K56	K56	0/3 stars	Eliminated																									118
Jellyfish Entertainment (젤리피쉬)	Pun (Note: Full Name: Peeraphas Wimonsrisuphap (พีรภาส วิมลศรีสุภาพ)) (빤)	19	1/3 stars	K57	K57	0/3 stars	Eliminated																									121
Individual Trainee (개인연습생)	Shin Jae-ha (신재하) (Note: Park Jun-seong and Shin Jae-ha were contestants on Debut's Plan.)	18	1/3 stars	K60	K58	0/3 stars	Eliminated																									122
RBW	Choi Jun-seok (최준석)	17	2/3 stars	K59	K61	0/3 stars	Eliminated																									126
Individual Trainee (개인연습생)	Kim Hyun-bin (김현빈)	18	1/3 stars	K66	K68	0/3 stars	Eliminated																									132
Jellyfish Entertainment (젤리피쉬)	Park Jun-seong (박준성)	19	2/3 stars	K69	K69	0/3 stars	Eliminated																									133
H.O.M.E Entertainment (홈엔터테인먼트)	Baek Jae-hyeon (백제현)	17	0/3 stars	Eliminated																												137-160
With US Entertainment (위드어스 엔터테인먼트)	Bang Su-hwan (방수환)	21	0/3 stars	Eliminated																												137-160
Individual Trainees (개인연습생)	Cho Myeong-su (조명수)	19	0/3 stars	Eliminated																												137-160
Individual Trainees (개인연습생)	Kim Min-jun (김민준)	22	0/3 stars	Eliminated																												137-160
Individual Trainees (개인연습생)	Kim Won-bin (김원빈)	18	0/3 stars	Eliminated																												137-160
Individual Trainees (개인연습생)	Kwon Gyu-hyung (권규형)	18	0/3 stars	Eliminated																												137-160
M Directors	Moon Suhn-bin (문선빈)	20	0/3 stars	Eliminated																												137-160
Zero-Hi (제로하이)	Park Ji-min (박지민)	22	0/3 stars	Eliminated																												137-160
Great M Entertainment (그레이트엠 엔터테인먼트)	Park Nu-ri (박누리)	16	0/3 stars	Eliminated																												137-160
With US Entertainment (위드어스 엔터테인먼트)	Thanatorn (Note: Full Name: Thanathorn Rueangsuwan (ธนาทร เรืองสุวรรณ)) (타나톤) (Note: Thanatorn is a member of The Wind)	20	0/3 stars	Eliminated																												137-160
Individual Trainee (개인연습생)	Yoo Ki-won (유기원)	18	0/3 stars	Eliminated																												137-160
C-Program
Nouer Entertainment (누아 엔터테인먼트)	Zhou Anxin (周安信) / (조우안신) (Note: Zhang Jiahao and Zhou Anxin were contestants on Make Mate 1.)	18	3/3 stars	C1	C1	3/3 stars	3	2	13	2,407,739	1,011,264	3,326,600	11,275,276	2	3/3 stars	Not Shown	15	3/3 stars	759,240	4,759,206	9,878,363	2	3/3 stars	18	453,838	2,568,155	5,736,338	2	3/3 stars	5,950,137	2	2
NCC Entertainment	He Xinlong (贺鑫隆) / (허씬롱) (Note: He Xinlong, Jia Hanyu, and Li Zihao are members of Boy Story.)	20	3/3 stars	C14	C15	3/3 stars	16	15	28	666,330	429,354	2,182,072	5,383,665	9	3/3 stars	Not Shown	9	3/3 stars	577,720	3,217,779	7,106,072	4	3/3 stars	20	240,338	1,364,754	2,957,303	6	3/3 stars	5,731,887	3	3
Nouer Entertainment (누아 엔터테인먼트)	Zhang Jiahao (张家豪) / (장지아하오)	23	3/3 stars	C12	C8	3/3 stars	8	16	26	1,005,735	82,160	1,127,998	2,926,734	18	3/3 stars	Not Shown	28	3/3 stars	116,266	1,456,951	2,599,298	19	3/3 stars	14	191,437	1,467,026	2,986,735	5	3/3 stars	4,238,175	5	5
Chromosome (染色体娱乐集团)	Chen Kaiwen (陈凯文) / (천카이원)	19	2/3 stars	C8	C6	1/3 stars	68	18	27	1,050,819	123,907	890,116	2,748,770	21	3/3 stars	Not Shown	16	3/3 stars	186,458	1,406,473	2,876,255	18	3/3 stars	2	228,161	1,125,983	2,598,471	12	3/3 stars	2,111,260	14	14
NCC Entertainment	Li Zihao (李梓豪) / (리즈하오)	20	2/3 stars	C16	C22	2/3 stars	47	37	34	254,945	222,781	386,626	1,838,909	31	2/3 stars	Not Shown	27	2/3 stars	366,186	1,030,093	3,074,115	17	3/3 stars	13	Not Shown		2,233,943	19	3/3 stars	Eliminated		19
Individual Trainees (개인연습생)	Sun Hengyu (孙亨裕) / (쑨헝위) (Note: Sun Hengyu is a former member of Blank2y.)	24	3/3 stars	C53	C4	2/3 stars	25	10	31	1,434,089	399,840	1,001,105	4,594,541	11	3/3 stars	Not Shown	31	3/3 stars	351,765	1,198,565	3,416,364	15	3/3 stars	15	Not Shown		1,407,831	20	3/3 stars	Eliminated		20
Individual Trainees (개인연습생)	Hu Hanwen (胡瀚文) / (후한원)	24	2/3 stars	C11	C14	1/3 stars	62	26	52	655,225	293,064	310,413	2,350,980	25	2/3 stars	Not Shown	25	3/3 stars	306,387	489,475	2,303,015	23	3/3 stars	12	Not Shown		1,033,027	24	3/3 stars	Eliminated		24
Individual Trainees (개인연습생)	Fan Zheyi (范哲逸) / (판저이)	19	3/3 stars	C3	C2	1/3 stars	59	11	70	1,546,848	252,271	861,367	3,775,085	13	3/3 stars	25	35	3/3 stars	201,026	841,494	2,285,265	25	2/3 stars	Eliminated								25
Individual Trainees (개인연습생)	Xue Suren (Note: Full Name: Xue Yongyi (薛永希)) (薛苏仁) / (쉬에수런) (Note: Xue Suren was a contestant on Under Nineteen.)	20	3/3 stars	C29	C32	2/3 stars	30	51	19	104,664	27,458	320,804	740,634	46	2/3 stars	26	36	2/3 stars	Not Shown			28	2/3 stars	Eliminated								28
Individual Trainees (개인연습생)	He Zhongxing (贺仲星) / (허중싱) (Note: He Zhongxing, Luo Junwei, and Yuan Peiyi are members of 1B1.)	21-22	2/3 stars	C17	C19	1/3 stars	70	32	60	456,232	161,336	359,092	1,633,150	36	2/3 stars	Not Shown	24	3/3 stars	Not Shown			29	2/3 stars	Eliminated								29
Bill Entertainment (빌엔터테인먼트)	Nian Boheng (年博恒) / (니안보행)	19	3/3 stars	C57	C13	3/3 stars	17	24	73	728,139	94,861	947,978	2,372,560	24	3/3 stars	Not Shown	44	2/3 stars	Not Shown			31	2/3 stars	Eliminated								31
iNKODE Entertainment (인코드 엔터테인먼트)	Sen (Note: Full Name: Shibuya Sen (渋谷 仙)) (센)	19	2/3 stars	C30	C11	2/3 stars	45	23	53	839,138	90,133	647,373	2,174,155	26	2/3 stars	Not Shown	40	2/3 stars	Not Shown			32	2/3 stars	Eliminated								32
IX Entertainment (IX 엔터테인먼트)	Zhao Guangxu (Note: Full Name: Zhào Yángguāngxù (赵杨光旭)) (赵光旭) / (자오광쉬) (Note: Xie Binghua, Yi Chen, and Zhao Guangxu were contestants on Project 7.)	21	1/3 stars	C9	C18	1/3 stars	64	28	75	628,141	38,920	723,677	1,735,494	34	2/3 stars	Not Shown	41	2/3 stars	Not Shown			34	2/3 stars	Eliminated								34
Hangzhou Time Flowing; Culture and Entertainment	Sun Jiayang (孙佳洋) / (쑨지아양) (Note: Bian Shiyu, Luo Junwei, Ngan Chauyuet, and Sun Jiayang were contestants on Starlight Boys.)	19	3/3 stars	C5	C3	1/3 stars	60	12	30	1,497,217	402,352	291,463	3,651,499	15	3/3 stars	Not Shown	34	2/3 stars	Not Shown			35	2/3 stars	Eliminated								35
Individual Trainee (개인연습생)	Peng Jinyu (彭锦煜) / (펑진위)	19	3/3 stars	C6	C9	1/3 stars	63	22	41	983,763	177,251	177,457	1,996,214	28	2/3 stars	Not Shown	37	2/3 stars	Not Shown			41	2/3 stars	Eliminated								41
Wake One Entertainment (웨이크원)	Yi Chen (Note: Full Name: Jīn Yǒngxiān (金永先)) (亦辰) / (이첸) (Note: Yi Chen was a contestant on Youth With You.)	26	2/3 stars	C4	C7	1/3 stars	80	21	36	1,013,173	118,264	822,316	2,898,457	19	3/3 stars	Not Shown	17	2/3 stars	Not Shown			42	2/3 stars	Eliminated								42
Individual Trainee (개인연습생)	Chen Bowen (陈博文) / (천보원)	17	3/3 stars	C36	C16	3/3 stars	18	27	67	641,899	64,238	706,275	1,838,611	32	2/3 stars	Not Shown	47	2/3 stars	Not Shown			44	2/3 stars	Eliminated								44
Dongyo Entertainment (동요엔터테인멘트)	Dang Hong Hai (Đặng Hồng Hải) / (당홍하이) (Note: Cai Jinxin, Dang Hong Hai, Krystian, and Xuan Hao were contestants on Boys Planet.)	21	3/3 stars	C13	C17	2/3 stars	28	25	5	643,215	112,549	540,799	1,939,468	30	2/3 stars	Not Shown	21	2/3 stars	Not Shown			46	2/3 stars	Eliminated								46
Dragon Team Film and Television Culture	Zhang Shunyu (张舜禹) / (장슌위)	15	2/3 stars	C33	C27	2/3 stars	31	48	29	133,861	30,161	217,533	648,287	51	1/3 stars	Eliminated																51
Giant Entertainment Music	Guo Zhen (郭震) / (궈쩐) (Note: Guo Zhen and Zheng Renyu are former members of S.K.Y and were contestants on We Are Young.)	22-23	2/3 stars	C24	C28	1/3 stars	56	52	55	Not Shown				52	1/3 stars	Eliminated																52
TEN Entertainment (텐엔터테인멘트)	Hong Zih-hao (洪子皓) / (홍쯔하오)	20	1/3 stars	C18	C23	1/3 stars	71	43	65	Not Shown				56	1/3 stars	Eliminated																56
Top Class Entertainment (托璞司娱乐)	Jiang Fan (姜帆) / (지앙판) (Note: He Junjin, Jiang Fan, and Xie Yuxin were contestants on Universe League.)	20	1/3 stars	C38	C37	2/3 stars	36	56	69	Not Shown				63	1/3 stars	Eliminated																63
Top Class Entertainment (托璞司娱乐)	Bian Shiyu (卞士宇) / (비엔스위)	19	2/3 stars	C41	C38	2/3 stars	38	62	77	Not Shown				64	1/3 stars	Eliminated																64
IX Entertainment (IX 엔터테인먼트)	Taiga (Note: Full Name: Fujimaki Taiga (藤牧 大雅)) (타이가) (Note: Taiga was a contestant on Nizi Project Season 2.)	20	1/3 stars	C42	C36	2/3 stars	46	59	78	Not Shown				65	1/3 stars	Eliminated																65
Individual Trainee (개인연습생)	Hong Zhihan (洪智函) / (홍쯔한)	21	2/3 stars	C61	C66	3/3 stars	21	74	63	Not Shown				70	1/3 stars	Eliminated																70
Dragon Team Film and Television Culture	Dong Jingkun (董靖坤) / (동징쿤)	19	3/3 stars	C56	C33	1/3 stars	76	63	46	Not Shown				72	1/3 stars	Eliminated																72
Wake One Entertainment (웨이크원)	Ko Ming-chieh (柯茗傑) / (커밍지에)	17	2/3 stars	C58	C59	1/3 stars	57	77	54	Not Shown				76	1/3 stars	Eliminated																76
RYCE Entertainment	Chrisen Yang (Note: Full Name: Yáng Qísēn (杨淇森)) (克里森 杨) / (크리센 양)	20	1/3 stars	C49	C51	1/3 stars	74	68	76	Not Shown				78	1/3 stars	Eliminated																78
EE-Media	Cai Jinxin (蔡锦昕) / (차이진신)	21	1/3 stars	C2	C5	0/3 stars	Eliminated																									81
Individual Trainee (개인연습생)	Xuan Hao (宣淏) / (쉬안하오) (Note: Xuan Hao is a member of DREAM4.) (Note: Chen Jinxin, Han Ruize, Krystian, and Xuan Hao were contestants on Youth With You 3.)	29	2/3 stars	C7	C10	0/3 stars	Eliminated																									82
NeedsLab Global & Culture (니즈랩글로벌앤컬쳐)	Lim Jack (임잭)	19	3/3 stars	C44	C12	0/3 stars	Eliminated																									83
RND Company (알앤디컴퍼니)	Xie Binghua (谢秉桦) / (시에빙화)	23	1/3 stars	C10	C20	0/3 stars	Eliminated																									85
Individual Trainee (개인연습생)	Krystian (Note: Full Name: Wáng Nánjūn (王南钧)) (크리스티안) (Note: Krystian is an inactive member of Now United.)	25	1/3 stars	C15	C21	0/3 stars	Eliminated																									86
I.E.One Entertainment (缔壹娱乐)	He Junjin (何俊锦) / (허준진)	20	2/3 stars	C19	C24	0/3 stars	Eliminated																									87
Individual Trainee (개인연습생)	Ngan Chau-yuet (顏秋越) / (안차우윗)	22	1/3 stars	C20	C25	0/3 stars	Eliminated																									88
Star Voyage Century‌	Zhou Zheng (周政) / (조우정) (Note: Li Xiaodi and Zhou Zheng are members of V.K Dream.)	25	1/3 stars	C22	C26	0/3 stars	Eliminated																									90
NCC Entertainment	Jia Hanyu (贾涵予) / (지아한위)	21	2/3 stars	C34	C29	0/3 stars	Eliminated																									91
Liancheng Entertainment	Sang Lin (桑淋) / (상린)	20	2/3 stars	C21	C30	0/3 stars	Eliminated																									93
TEN Entertainment (텐엔터테인멘트)	Lin Ching-en (林擎恩) / (린칭언) (Note: Chen Li-chi, Huang Hsin-yu, and Lin Ching-en were contestants on Scool.)	21	1/3 stars	C28	C31	0/3 stars	Eliminated																									94
Individual Trainee (개인연습생)	Zheng Kun (郑坤) / (정쿤)	20	1/3 stars	C46	C34	0/3 stars	Eliminated																									96
Liancheng Entertainment	Zhou Yanhe (周言赫) / (조우옌허)	22	1/3 stars	C32	C35	0/3 stars	Eliminated																									98
Joy Media (조이 미디어)	Wang Zhongzhi (王忠智) / (왕종쯔) (Note: Wang Zhongzhi was a contestant on Project 7, but did not make it past the Zero Setting Test)	23	1/3 stars	C39	C39	0/3 stars	Eliminated																									99
Individual Trainees (개인연습생)	Han Ruize (韩瑞泽) / (한루이저)	24	2/3 stars	C26	C40	0/3 stars	Eliminated																									100
Individual Trainees (개인연습생)	Long Guohao (龙國浩) / (룽궈하오) (Note: Long Guohao was a contestant on Fantasy Boys.)	24	2/3 stars	C35	C41	0/3 stars	Eliminated																									101
RYCE Entertainment	Zheng Renyu (郑人予) / (정런위)	28	2/3 stars	C40	C42	0/3 stars	Eliminated																									103
HEY+ Entertainment	Wang Dongyi (王东熠) / (왕동이)	22	1/3 stars	C45	C43	0/3 stars	Eliminated																									105
TEN Entertainment (天空娛樂)	Chen Li-chi (陳立其) / (천리치)	19	1/3 stars	C23	C44	0/3 stars	Eliminated																									107
Top Class Entertainment (托璞司娱乐)	Xie Yuxin (解雨鑫) / (시에위신)	20	2/3 stars	C43	C45	0/3 stars	Eliminated																									108
Individual Trainee (개인연습생)	Chen Jinxin (陈金鑫) / (천진신)	26	2/3 stars	C25	C47	0/3 stars	Eliminated																									109
YS Group (와이에스그룹)	Wong Sik-hei (黃錫熙) / (왕식헤이)	16	1/3 stars	C51	C48	0/3 stars	Eliminated																									111
I.E.One Entertainment (缔壹娱乐)	Chen Zishuo (陈凯文) / (천즈슈어)	22	1/3 stars	C31	C49	0/3 stars	Eliminated																									112
TM Entertainment (티엠엔터테인먼트)	Phoenix (Note: Full Name: Kandit Sittisak (คันดิษฐ์ สิทธิศักดิ์)) (피닉스) (Note: Phoenix is a member of Eastshine.)	16	1/3 stars	C48	C50	0/3 stars	Eliminated																									113
TEN Entertainment (텐엔터테인멘트)	Huang Hsin-yu (黃薪祐) / (황신유)	20	1/3 stars	C52	C53	0/3 stars	Eliminated																									114
Individual Trainees (개인연습생)	Yuan Wei (袁威) / (위안웨이)	26	1/3 stars	C64	C54	0/3 stars	Eliminated																									116
Individual Trainees (개인연습생)	Sun Hanlin (孙涵霖) / (쑨한린)	21	1/3 stars	C59	C56	0/3 stars	Eliminated																									119
Individual Trainees (개인연습생)	Xie Jiahui (谢家辉) / (시에지아후이)	22	1/3 stars	C54	C57	0/3 stars	Eliminated																									120
YX Media Entertainment	Wang Shenglin (王圣琳) / (왕성린)	22	1/3 stars	C65	C58	0/3 stars	Eliminated																									123
Top Class Entertainment (托璞司娱乐)	Dong Ziqi (董子奇) / (동쯔치)	21	1/3 stars	C37	C60	0/3 stars	Eliminated																									124
Individual Trainees (개인연습생)	Zhang Yuxi (张宇熙) / (장위시)	22	1/3 stars	C55	C61	0/3 stars	Eliminated																									125
Individual Trainees (개인연습생)	Yang Jiapeng (杨佳鹏) / (양지아펑)	24	2/3 stars	C68	C62	0/3 stars	Eliminated																									127
Top Class Entertainment (托璞司娱乐)	Zhang Yihua (张艺华) / (장이화)	18	2/3 stars	C60	C64	0/3 stars	Eliminated																									128
esee	Zhang Shiyi (张释艺) / (장스이)	23	1/3 stars	C62	C65	0/3 stars	Eliminated																									129
Individual Trainee (개인연습생)	Weng Weidong (翁伟栋) / (웡웨이둥)	22	1/3 stars	C67	C67	0/3 stars	Eliminated																									130
Uni-Icon Entertainment (유니 아이콘 엔터테인먼트)	Qiao Guanzhen (乔冠臻) / (챠오권전)	23	2/3 stars	C63	C68	0/3 stars	Eliminated																									131
Dragon Team Film and Television Culture	Chen Yuqi (陈禹圻) / (천위치)	18	1/3 stars	Left the show																												134-136
Emperor Entertainment Group (英皇娱乐)	Lin Qiunan (林秋楠) / (린츄난)	21	1/3 stars	Left the show																												134-136
The Line Star Entertainment (线星娱乐)	Luo Junwei (罗俊炜) / (루어쥔웨이) (Note: Luo Jun-wei was a contestant on The Coming One 2.)	23	1/3 stars	Left the show																												134-136
Individual Trainees (개인연습생)	Chen Chaoyu (陳昭宇) / (천차오위)	19	0/3 stars	C27	C46	Eliminated (Note: Chen Chao-yu, Li Xiao-di, Ma Tao, and Teng Chia-chun were all eliminated at the Class Placement Match, but they all still were given rankings in Episodes 1 & 2)																										137-160
Individual Trainees (개인연습생)	Han Jiangyu (韩江宇) / (한지앙위)	22	0/3 stars	Eliminated (Note: Han Jiang-yu, He Jia-hao, and Yuan Pei-yi all were marked as "discharged" (left the show) but the episodes indicate they were simply eliminated with a No Star class level)																												137-160
iNKODE Entertainment (인코드 엔터테인먼트)	He Jiahao (何嘉浩) / (허지아하오)	19	0/3 stars	Eliminated																												137-160
Star Voyage Century‌	Li Xiaodi (李筱迪) / (리샤오디)	24	0/3 stars	C50	C52	Eliminated																										137-160
Individual Trainees (개인연습생)	Li Zheng'en (李政恩) / (리정언)	22	0/3 stars	Eliminated																												137-160
Individual Trainees (개인연습생)	Lin Xinrui (林锌锐) / (린신루이)	22	0/3 stars	Eliminated																												137-160
Liancheng Entertainment	Ma Tao (马韬) / (마타오)	22	0/3 stars	C47	C55	Eliminated																										137-160
R.O.S Entertainment	Qi Lin (麒麟) / (치린)	19	0/3 stars	Eliminated																												137-160
Individual Trainees (개인연습생)	Teng Chia-chun (鄧佳駿) / (덩지아쥔)	23	0/3 stars	C66	C63	Eliminated																										137-160
Individual Trainees (개인연습생)	Wang Canruo (王灿若) / (왕찬루어)	25	0/3 stars	Eliminated																												137-160
Media Asia (寰亞娛樂集團有限公司)	Yeung Yuk-him (楊煜謙) / (영육힘)	22	0/3 stars	Eliminated																												137-160
The Line Star Entertainment (线星娱乐)	Yuan Peiyi (袁培艺) / (위안페이이)	22	0/3 stars	Eliminated																												137-160
Individual Trainee (개인연습생)	Zeng Shangxuan (曾上轩) / (쩡상쉬안)	19	0/3 stars	Eliminated																												137-160

=== Prior to Boys II Planet ===
K-Program
C-Program

== Class Placement Match (Episode 1-2) ==
This mission would either have the contestants start by rating themselves based on their perception of their own skills out of three stars (Note: K Program) or having the other teams rating each team based on first impressions, (Note: C Program) with stickers on their name tags to indicate the final choice, but, the initial All Star class would be automatically reserved for, but not limited to, contestants who have previously debuted as a member of a boy group already, or those under a Korean company. Once every team has done so, they would all present the performances they have prepared, in front of the masters and the other contestants. After each performance, the masters would then re-assess and re-categorize every contestant appropriately. If any contestant doesn't agree with the class they were initially given, they can ask for an extra test. Any contestant to finally be re-assessed with a No Star level would be immediately eliminated from the show.

Key

All Star	3/3 stars
2 Star	2/3 stars
1 Star	1/3 stars
No Star	0/3 stars

Class Placement Match
K-Group							C-Group						
Performance			Company/ Group/ Region	Contestants	Initial Assessment	Screening Level	Performance			Company/ Region	Contestants	Initial Assessment	Screening Level
#	Song	Original artist(s)	Company/ Group/ Region	Contestants	Initial Assessment	Screening Level	#	Song	Original artist(s)	Company/ Region	Contestants	Initial Assessment	Screening Level
Episode 1
1	"Misfit"	NCT U	IST Entertainment	Arctic	3/3 stars	3/3 stars	1	"On And On" (다칠 준비가 돼 있어)	VIXX	Jiangsu-Zhejiang-Shanghai A	He Zhongxing	2/3 stars	2/3 stars
1	"Misfit"	NCT U	IST Entertainment	Kim Si-hwan	3/3 stars	3/3 stars	1	"On And On" (다칠 준비가 돼 있어)	VIXX	Jiangsu-Zhejiang-Shanghai A	Yuan Wei	2/3 stars	1/3 stars
1	"Misfit"	NCT U	IST Entertainment	Park Dong-gyu	3/3 stars	3/3 stars	1	"On And On" (다칠 준비가 돼 있어)	VIXX	Jiangsu-Zhejiang-Shanghai A	Zheng Kun	2/3 stars	1/3 stars
1	"Misfit"	NCT U	IST Entertainment	Rensho	3/3 stars	3/3 stars	2	"Get A Guitar"	Riize	Chromosome Entertainment	Chen Kaiwen	3/3 stars	2/3 stars
2	"Bang Bang Bang"	BigBang	MCND	Bang Jun-hyuk	3/3 stars	1/3 stars	3	"Devil Game"	Zerobaseone	Shanghai	Chen Bowen	2/3 stars	3/3 stars
2	"Bang Bang Bang"	BigBang	MCND	Noh Hui-jun	3/3 stars	2/3 stars	3	"Devil Game"	Zerobaseone	Shanghai	Fan Zheyi	2/3 stars	3/3 stars
2	"Bang Bang Bang"	BigBang	MCND	Song Min-jae	3/3 stars	2/3 stars	3	"Devil Game"	Zerobaseone	Shanghai	Hu Hanwen	2/3 stars	2/3 stars
3	"Boy In Luv" (상남자)	BTS	Cube Entertainment	Kim Jae-hyun	2/3 stars	2/3 stars	3	"Devil Game"	Zerobaseone	Shanghai	Yang Jiapeng	2/3 stars	2/3 stars
3	"Boy In Luv" (상남자)	BTS	Cube Entertainment	Na Yun-seo	2/3 stars	2/3 stars	4	"Pump !t Up"	Boy Story	Beijing A	Chrisen Yang	0/3 stars	1/3 stars
4	"Sweat"	Zerobaseone	Jeonju	Kim Geon-woo	1/3 stars	3/3 stars	4	"Pump !t Up"	Boy Story	Beijing A	He Junjin	0/3 stars	2/3 stars
5	"Hip"	Mamamoo	ChoCo1	Kim Tae-jo	3/3 stars	3/3 stars	4	"Pump !t Up"	Boy Story	Beijing A	Qi Lin	0/3 stars	0/3 stars
5	"Hip"	Mamamoo	ChoCo1	Yeom Ye-chan	3/3 stars	3/3 stars	4	"Pump !t Up"	Boy Story	Beijing A	Sun Jiayang	0/3 stars	3/3 stars
6	"If I'm S, Can You Be My N?" (내가 S면 넌 나의 N이 되어줘)	TWS	FNC Entertainment	Chuei Li-yu	1/3 stars	1/3 stars	5	"Turn Up"	Nick Chou	Ningbo	Chen Yuqi	3/3 stars	1/3 stars
6	"If I'm S, Can You Be My N?" (내가 S면 넌 나의 N이 되어줘)	TWS	FNC Entertainment	Kenshiro	2/3 stars	1/3 stars	5	"Turn Up"	Nick Chou	Ningbo	Dong Jingkun	3/3 stars	3/3 stars
7	"Candy"	Baekhyun	Great M Entertainment	Lee Yoon-chan	2/3 stars	1/3 stars	5	"Turn Up"	Nick Chou	Ningbo	Lin Qiunan	3/3 stars	1/3 stars
7	"Candy"	Baekhyun	Great M Entertainment	Park Nu-ri	1/3 stars	0/3 stars	5	"Turn Up"	Nick Chou	Ningbo	Zhang Shunyu	3/3 stars	2/3 stars
8	"Here I Am" (난 빛나)	Boys Planet	Gyeonggi	Kim Hyun-bin	1/3 stars	1/3 stars	6	"Earth, Wind & Fire"	BoyNextDoor	YS Group & TM Entertainment	Phoenix	3/3 stars	1/3 stars
8	"Here I Am" (난 빛나)	Boys Planet	Gyeonggi	Kim Min-jun	2/3 stars	0/3 stars	6	"Earth, Wind & Fire"	BoyNextDoor	YS Group & TM Entertainment	Wong Sik-hei	3/3 stars	1/3 stars
8	"Here I Am" (난 빛나)	Boys Planet	Gyeonggi	Kim Won-bin	2/3 stars	0/3 stars	7	"Candy"	NCT Dream	RND Company	Xie Binghua	3/3 stars	1/3 stars
8	"Here I Am" (난 빛나)	Boys Planet	Gyeonggi	Moon Suhn-bin	3/3 stars	0/3 stars	8	"Crown" (어느 날 머리에서 뿔이 자랐다)	TXT	iNKODE Entertainment	He Jiahao	3/3 stars	0/3 stars
9	"Say My Name"	Boys Planet	Seoul A	Kwon Gyu-hyung	1/3 stars	0/3 stars	8	"Crown" (어느 날 머리에서 뿔이 자랐다)	TXT	iNKODE Entertainment	Sen	3/3 stars	2/3 stars
9	"Say My Name"	Boys Planet	Seoul A	Park Ji-min	1/3 stars	0/3 stars	9	"Never"	Produce 101 Season 2	Individual Trainee	Sun Hengyu	3/3 stars	3/3 stars
10	"Lemonade"	NCT 127	With US Entertainment	Bang Su-hwan	1/3 stars	0/3 stars	10	"Super Girl (Chinese ver.)"	Super Junior-M	Jiangsu-Zhejiang-Shanghai B	Han Jiangyu	2/3 stars	0/3 stars
10	"Lemonade"	NCT 127	With US Entertainment	Oh Jun-ho	2/3 stars	1/3 stars	10	"Super Girl (Chinese ver.)"	Super Junior-M	Jiangsu-Zhejiang-Shanghai B	Li Zheng'en	2/3 stars	0/3 stars
11	"Maverick"	The Boyz	Seoul B	Cho Myeong-su	3/3 stars	0/3 stars	10	"Super Girl (Chinese ver.)"	Super Junior-M	Jiangsu-Zhejiang-Shanghai B	Wang Canruo	2/3 stars	0/3 stars
11	"Maverick"	The Boyz	Seoul B	Lee Won-woo	3/3 stars	1/3 stars	10	"Super Girl (Chinese ver.)"	Super Junior-M	Jiangsu-Zhejiang-Shanghai B	Zhang Yuxi	2/3 stars	1/3 stars
11	"Maverick"	The Boyz	Seoul B	Shin Jae-ha	1/3 stars	1/3 stars	11	"Naughty Boy" (청개구리)	Pentagon	Sichuan-Chongqing A	Lin Xinrui	2/3 stars	0/3 stars
11	"Maverick"	The Boyz	Seoul B	Yoo Ki-won	2/3 stars	0/3 stars	11	"Naughty Boy" (청개구리)	Pentagon	Sichuan-Chongqing A	Zeng Shangxuan	2/3 stars	0/3 stars
12	"Vibe"	Taeyang	The Wind	Thanatorn	1/3 stars	0/3 stars	12	"Bang Bang Bang"	BigBang	Media Asia	Yeung Yuk-him	3/3 stars	0/3 stars
13	"Chk Chk Boom"	Stray Kids	Daegu	Baek Jae-hyeon	1/3 stars	0/3 stars	13	"TAP"	Taeyong	Bill Entertainment & NeedsLab	Lim Jack	3/3 stars	3/3 stars
14	"Oh Mymy: 7s"	TWS	Wake One Entertainment	Hsu Ching-yu	3/3 stars	3/3 stars	13	"TAP"	Taeyong	Bill Entertainment & NeedsLab	Nian Boheng	3/3 stars	3/3 stars
14	"Oh Mymy: 7s"	TWS	Wake One Entertainment	Hwang Sun-woo	2/3 stars	1/3 stars	14	"Fever"	Enhypen	Nouer Entertainment	Zhang Jiahao	3/3 stars	3/3 stars
14	"Oh Mymy: 7s"	TWS	Wake One Entertainment	Reeonn	2/3 stars	1/3 stars	14	"Fever"	Enhypen	Nouer Entertainment	Zhou Anxin	3/3 stars	3/3 stars
14	"Oh Mymy: 7s"	TWS	Wake One Entertainment	Shoya	3/3 stars	2/3 stars	Episode 2						
14	"Oh Mymy: 7s"	TWS	Wake One Entertainment	Tatsuki	2/3 stars	2/3 stars	15	"Chk Chk Boom"	Stray Kids	Boys Planet	Cai Jinxin	3/3 stars	1/3 stars
15	"Atlantis Princess" (아틀란티스 소녀)	BoA	Boryeong	Kang Woo-jin	2/3 stars	3/3 stars	15	"Chk Chk Boom"	Stray Kids	Boys Planet	Krystian	3/3 stars	1/3 stars
16	"We Must Love" (사랑하게 될 거야)	ONF	Verivery	Jo Gye-hyeon	3/3 stars	3/3 stars	15	"Chk Chk Boom"	Stray Kids	Boys Planet	Xuan Hao	3/3 stars	2/3 stars
16	"We Must Love" (사랑하게 될 거야)	ONF	Verivery	Lee Dong-heon	3/3 stars	3/3 stars	16	"I'll See You There Tomorrow" (내일에서 기다릴게)	TXT	Dongyo Entertainment	Dang Hong Hai	3/3 stars	3/3 stars
16	"We Must Love" (사랑하게 될 거야)	ONF	Verivery	Yoo Kang-min	3/3 stars	3/3 stars	17	"Ggum"	Yeonjun	Hong Kong	Ngan Chau-yuet	2/3 stars	1/3 stars
17	"No Doubt"	ENHYPEN	GRID Entertainment	Lee Leo	3/3 stars	3/3 stars	17	"Ggum"	Yeonjun	Hong Kong	Xue Suren	2/3 stars	3/3 stars
17	"No Doubt"	ENHYPEN	GRID Entertainment	Lee Sang-won	3/3 stars	3/3 stars	18	"Maverick"	The Boyz	Wake One Entertainment	Ko Ming-chieh	3/3 stars	2/3 stars
Episode 2							18	"Maverick"	The Boyz	Wake One Entertainment	Yi Chen	3/3 stars	2/3 stars
18	"Sweet Venom"	ENHYPEN	WEi	Kim Jun-seo	3/3 stars	2/3 stars	19	"Miracle"	Super Junior	Liaoning	Peng Jinyu	1/3 stars	3/3 stars
19	"Ggum"	Yeonjun	Nouer Entertainment	Jung Hyun-jun	3/3 stars	3/3 stars	20	"Back Door"	Stray Kids	NCC Entertainment	He Xinlong	3/3 stars	3/3 stars
20 (Note: The K contestants from P Nation seem to have performed one song showed on broadcast, and one song uploaded to YouTube)	"The Roots" (뿌리)	Show Me the Money 9	P Nation	Kim Dong-hyun B	3/3 stars	3/3 stars	20	"Back Door"	Stray Kids	NCC Entertainment	Jia Hanyu	3/3 stars	2/3 stars
20	"Break Off the Yoke" (굴레를 벗어나)	Deux	P Nation	Yusen	1/3 stars	2/3 stars	20	"Back Door"	Stray Kids	NCC Entertainment	Li Zihao	3/3 stars	2/3 stars
21	"Artist"	Zico	Wake One H	Chung Sang-hyeon	3/3 stars	2/3 stars	Not Shown						
21	"Artist"	Zico	Wake One H	Justin	3/3 stars	1/3 stars	21	"Sheep"	Lay Zhang	Taipei	Chen Chaoyu	1/3 stars	0/3 stars
22	"Future Perfect (Pass the Mic)"	ENHYPEN	Whib	Jun Lee-jeong	3/3 stars	2/3 stars	21	"Sheep"	Lay Zhang	Taipei	Teng Chia-chun	1/3 stars	0/3 stars
22	"Future Perfect (Pass the Mic)"	ENHYPEN	Whib	Kim Jun-min	3/3 stars	3/3 stars	22	"If I'm S, Can You Be My N?" (내가 S면 넌 나의 N이 되어줘)	TWS	TEN Entertainment	Chen Li-chi	1/3 stars	1/3 stars
22	"Future Perfect (Pass the Mic)"	ENHYPEN	Whib	Muhn Won-jun	3/3 stars	2/3 stars	22	"If I'm S, Can You Be My N?" (내가 S면 넌 나의 N이 되어줘)	TWS	TEN Entertainment	Hong Zih-hao	1/3 stars	1/3 stars
23	"Back Down"	P1Harmony	DKB	Han Harry June	3/3 stars	3/3 stars	22	"If I'm S, Can You Be My N?" (내가 S면 넌 나의 N이 되어줘)	TWS	TEN Entertainment	Huang Hsin-yu	1/3 stars	1/3 stars
23	"Back Down"	P1Harmony	DKB	Yang Heui-chan	3/3 stars	3/3 stars	22	"If I'm S, Can You Be My N?" (내가 S면 넌 나의 N이 되어줘)	TWS	TEN Entertainment	Lin Ching-en	1/3 stars	1/3 stars
24	"Rainism"	Rain	Yokohama	Yumeki	3/3 stars	1/3 stars	23	"Be Mine" (내꺼하자)	Infinite	Guangdong	Chen Jinxin	0/3 stars	2/3 stars
Not Shown							23	"Be Mine" (내꺼하자)	Infinite	Guangdong	Hong Zhihan	0/3 stars	2/3 stars
25	"Spot!"	Zico	Bill Entertainment	Andrew	3/3 stars	2/3 stars	23	"Be Mine" (내꺼하자)	Infinite	Guangdong	Long Guohao	0/3 stars	2/3 stars
25	"Spot!"	Zico	Bill Entertainment	Taichi	2/3 stars	1/3 stars	24	"My Field"	One By One (Note: Self Composed)	The Line Star Entertainment	Luo Junwei	2/3 stars	1/3 stars
26	"I Need U"	BTS	Big Planet Made Entertainment	Aoshi	2/3 stars	1/3 stars	24	"My Field"	One By One	The Line Star Entertainment	Yuan Peiyi	2/3 stars	0/3 stars
26	"I Need U"	BTS	Big Planet Made Entertainment	Kim In-hu	2/3 stars	2/3 stars	25	"Wolf" (늑대와 미녀)(Chinese Ver.)	NCT U	Beijing B	Li Xiaodi	0/3 stars	0/3 stars
27	"Dingga" (딩가딩가)	Mamamoo	RBW	Choi Jun-seok	1/3 stars	2/3 stars	25	"Wolf" (늑대와 미녀)(Chinese Ver.)	NCT U	Beijing B	Qiao Guanzhen	0/3 stars	2/3 stars
27	"Dingga" (딩가딩가)	Mamamoo	RBW	Yang Da-wit	1/3 stars	2/3 stars	25	"Wolf" (늑대와 미녀)(Chinese Ver.)	NCT U	Beijing B	Zhou Zheng	0/3 stars	1/3 stars
28	"Dope" (쩔어)	BTS	Blitzers	Chris	3/3 stars	1/3 stars	25	"Really Really"	Winner	Liancheng Entertainment	Ma Tao	3/3 stars	0/3 stars
29	"Super" (손오공)	Seventeen	Staron Entertainment	Heo Ji-o	2/3 stars	1/3 stars	25	"Really Really"	Winner	Liancheng Entertainment	Sang Lin	3/3 stars	2/3 stars
30	"I'll See You There Tomorrow" (내일에서 기다릴게)	TXT	ES Nation	Jang Han-eum	3/3 stars	2/3 stars	25	"Really Really"	Winner	Liancheng Entertainment	Zhou Yanhe	3/3 stars	1/3 stars
31	"Baggy Jeans"	NCT U	iNKODE Entertainment	Jang Tae-yoon	2/3 stars	2/3 stars	26	"Patting and Dragging" (연애)	Self Composed	Hangzhou	Weng Weidong	1/3 stars	1/3 stars
31	"Baggy Jeans"	NCT U	iNKODE Entertainment	Masato	3/3 stars	2/3 stars	27	"Descent of Warriors" (전사의 후예)	H.O.T.	Sichuan-Chongqing B	Chen Zishuo	3/3 stars	1/3 stars
31	"Baggy Jeans"	NCT U	iNKODE Entertainment	Park Jun-il	3/3 stars	2/3 stars	27	"Descent of Warriors" (전사의 후예)	H.O.T.	Sichuan-Chongqing B	Han Ruize	3/3 stars	2/3 stars
32	"G.B.T.B."	Verivery	Jellyfish Entertainment	Kim Daniel	3/3 stars	1/3 stars	27	"Descent of Warriors" (전사의 후예)	H.O.T.	Sichuan-Chongqing B	Wang Dongyi	3/3 stars	1/3 stars
32	"G.B.T.B."	Verivery	Jellyfish Entertainment	Kim Hyeon-seo	2/3 stars	1/3 stars	27	"Descent of Warriors" (전사의 후예)	H.O.T.	Sichuan-Chongqing B	Wang Shenglin	3/3 stars	1/3 stars
32	"G.B.T.B."	Verivery	Jellyfish Entertainment	Kim Young-jun	1/3 stars	1/3 stars	27	"Descent of Warriors" (전사의 후예)	H.O.T.	Sichuan-Chongqing B	Wang Zhongzhi	3/3 stars	1/3 stars
32	"G.B.T.B."	Verivery	Jellyfish Entertainment	Park Jun-seong	3/3 stars	2/3 stars	28	"Lucifer" (루시퍼)	Shinee	Seoul	Sun Hanlin	1/3 stars	1/3 stars
32	"G.B.T.B."	Verivery	Jellyfish Entertainment	Pun	2/3 stars	1/3 stars	28	"Lucifer" (루시퍼)	Shinee	Seoul	Xie Jiahui	1/3 stars	1/3 stars
33	"Love Me Right"	Exo	Cheongju	Kim Dong-hyun A	3/3 stars	2/3 stars	29	"Rover"	Kai	esee	Zhang Shiyi	2/3 stars	1/3 stars
34	"Be Mine" (내꺼하자)	Infinite	Drippin	Kim Dong-yun	3/3 stars	1/3 stars	30	"Jikjin" (직진)	Treasure	IX Entertainment	Taiga	3/3 stars	1/3 stars
34	"Be Mine" (내꺼하자)	Infinite	Drippin	Lee Hyeop	3/3 stars	2/3 stars	30	"Jikjin" (직진)	Treasure	IX Entertainment	Zhao Guangxu	3/3 stars	1/3 stars
35	"Replay" (누난 너무 예뻐)	Shinee	Woollim Entertainment	Lee Seung-baek	2/3 stars	1/3 stars	31	"If You Do" (니가 하면)	Got7	S.K.Y	Guo Zhen	3/3 stars	2/3 stars
36	"Ganadara"	Jay Park	WAYF	Ryan	1/3 stars	2/3 stars	31	"If You Do" (니가 하면)	Got7	S.K.Y	Zheng Renyu	3/3 stars	2/3 stars
37	"Feel the Pop"	Zerobaseone	NINE.i	Seo Won	3/3 stars	2/3 stars	32	"Frequency"	WayV	Top Class Entertainment	Bian Shiyu	2/3 stars	2/3 stars
38	"Chewing Gum"	NCT Dream	n.CH Entertainment	Ham Hyun-seo	1/3 stars	1/3 stars	32	"Frequency"	WayV	Top Class Entertainment	Dong Ziqi	2/3 stars	1/3 stars
38	"Chewing Gum"	NCT Dream	n.CH Entertainment	Sho	1/3 stars	1/3 stars	32	"Frequency"	WayV	Top Class Entertainment	Jiang Fan	2/3 stars	1/3 stars
39	"Blood Sweat & Tears" (피 땀 눈물)	BTS	Hokkaido	Tomoya	2/3 stars	1/3 stars	32	"Frequency"	WayV	Top Class Entertainment	Xie Yuxin	2/3 stars	2/3 stars
40	"Spot!"	Zico	howtouse	Yoon Min	3/3 stars	3/3 stars	32	"Frequency"	WayV	Top Class Entertainment	Zhang Yihua	2/3 stars	2/3 stars

== Signal Song Test (Episode 2) ==
This mission would have the contestants learning and performing the signal song of the show, 'Hola Solar', which would give the contestants a chance to change their initial class from the Class Placement Match. For the first part of the mission, the contestants would perform their preparations for the masters and the other contestants, and the masters would re-evaluate them again, ranging from All Star to No Star, while also being able to hold off on assessing each contestant right away, or changing certain contestants classes as necessary after discussion. Unlike the Class Placement Match, an initial No Star re-assessment from the masters would not mean immediate elimination, instead, for the second part of the mission, those with a No Star re-assessment would not be able to stand on the stage when performing the signal song. All the other contestants would be organized on stage by class, from All Star down to One Star, with one of the All Star contestants being highlighted as the Killing part, and six contestants being highlighted in the Dance Unit or the Rap Unit, and for each program. The contestant chosen for the Killing Part would be decided by the masters' evaluations and the contestants' votes combined, after watching the performance from the candidates selected by the masters. After the performance of the signal song, only 52 contestants from the K program, and 28 contestants from the C program, for a total of 80 contestants, would be able to move onto the next round. The final class of the contestants would be decided by the masters' evaluations (70%) and Star Creators' views and likes (30% (Note: From YouTube & Mnet Plus)), with those not falling into the allotted amount for their respective program receiving a final class of No Star, and being eliminated from the show.

Key

▲	Star Level Promotion
Same position	Star Level Maintained
▼	Star Level Demotion
	Center
	Dance Unit
	Rap Unit

Signal Song Test Results
After Before		All Star	2 Star	1 Star	No Star
All Star	K	Hsu Ching-yu; Jo Gye-hyeon; Jung Hyun-jun; Kim Geon-woo; Kim Jun-min; Kim Si-hwan; Kim Tae-jo; Lee Leo; Lee Sang-won; Park Dong-gyu; Yoo Kang-min; Yoon Min	Han Harry June ▼; Lee Dong-heon ▼; Yang Heui-chan ▼; Yeom Ye-chan ▼	Arctic ▼; Kang Woo-jin ▼; Kim Dong-hyun B ▼; Rensho ▼	—N/a
All Star	C	Chen Bowen; He Xinlong; Nian Boheng; Zhang Jiahao; Zhou Anxin	Dang Hong Hai ▼; Sun Hengyu ▼; Xue Suren ▼	Dong Jingkun ▼; Fan Zheyi ▼; Peng Jinyu ▼; Sun Jiayang ▼	Lim Jack ▼
2 Star	K	Kim In-hu ▲; Kim Jun-seo ▲; Na Yun-seo ▲; Noh Hui-jun ▲; Seo Won ▲	Andrew; Jang Tae-yoon; Masato; Muhn Won-jun; Park Jun-il; Tatsuki; Yusen	Chung Sang-hyeon ▼; Jang Han-eum ▼; Jun Lee-jeong ▼; Kim Dong-hyun A ▼; Kim Jae-hyun ▼; Song Min-jae ▼; Yang Da-wit ▼	Choi Jun-seok ▼; Lee Hyeop ▼; Park Jun-seong ▼; Ryan ▼; Shoya ▼
2 Star	C	Hong Zhihan ▲	Bian Shiyu; Li Zihao; Sen; Zhang Shunyu	Chen Kaiwen ▼; Guo Zhen ▼; He Zhongxing ▼; Hu Hanwen ▼; Ko Ming-chieh ▼; Yi Chen ▼	Chen Jinxin ▼; He Junjin ▼; Long Guohao ▼; Sang Lin ▼; Xuan Hao ▼; Zhang Yihua ▼; Han Ruize ▼; Jia Hanyu ▼; Qiao Guanzhen ▼; Xie Yuxin ▼; Yang Jiapeng ▼; Zheng Renyu ▼
1 Star	K	Yumeki ▲	Aoshi ▲; Kim Dong-yun ▲; Oh Jun-ho ▲; Reeonn ▲	Bang Jun-hyuk; Chuei Li-yu; Ham Hyun-seo; Kim Daniel; Kim Hyeon-seo; Kim Young-jun; Lee Seung-baek; Sho	Chris ▼; Hwang Sun-woo ▼; Kenshiro ▼; Lee Won-woo ▼; Pun ▼; Taichi ▼; Heo Ji-o ▼; Justin ▼; Kim Hyun-bin ▼; Lee Yoon-chan ▼; Shin Jae-ha ▼; Tomoya ▼
1 Star	C	—N/a	Jiang Fan ▲; Taiga ▲	Chrisen Yang; Hong Zih-hao; Zhao Guangxu	Cai Jinxin ▼; Chen Zishuo ▼; Huang Hsin-yu ▼; Lin Ching-en ▼; Phoenix ▼; Wang Dongyi ▼; Wang Zhongzhi ▼; Wong Sik-hei ▼; Xie Jiahui ▼; Zhang Shiyi ▼; Zheng Kun ▼; Zhou Zheng ▼; Chen Li-chi ▼; Dong Ziqi ▼; Krystian ▼; Ngan Chau-yuet ▼; Sun Hanlin ▼; Wang Shenglin ▼; Weng Weidong ▼; Xie Binghua ▼; Yuan Wei ▼; Zhang Yuxi ▼; Zhou Yanhe ▼

== 1 vs 1 Class Battle (Episode 3-4) ==
This mission will have teams of contestants from the different classes going up against each other. All the songs presented to the contestants are songs from artists who have won the Best New Artist Award at Mnet's year-end awards ceremony, the MAMA Awards. (Note: Winners from 2004, 2018, 2021, 2023, and 2024) The songs presented are as follows: Rising Sun by TVXQ!, S-Class by Stray Kids, Whiplash by aespa, Kill the Romeo by Zerobaseone, and Plot Twist by TWS. The team compositions are chosen by certain contestants, with those with the highest rank in their class getting to start by choosing their team members, followed by the next highest ranking contestant afterwards, until the last team in each class being made up of the contestants who weren't chosen previously. The song selection for the teams went mostly in order that they were formed, with the teams with the higher-ranking members getting to choose first, but if any team wanted to immediately be the opponent to the team that just made their selection, they would be able to choose so, if space allowed. The part distributions for this mission would be decided by the contestants themselves, with the final selections being done by the leader. The audience voting for the performances are split into two different point tallies, the team score, which is an X vs O choice based on the overall quality of the performance, and the individual score, which pits the contestants in the same position up against each other for audience votes. If any team wins against another team of the same class or higher, all the members on that winning team would gain benefit points based on the matchup at hand. As an additional benefit, the team with the performance the audience wants to see again the most, would have the chance to perform on M Countdown and Studio Choom. After the performances, only 48 contestants would be able to move onto the next round. The 32 contestants who receive a final class of One Star would be eliminated from the show.

Color key

Killing Part
Leader
Leader and Killing Part
Winning Team

Bold denotes the contestant who picked each team's members.

1 vs 1 Class Battle
Performance		#	Team				Contestants			#	Team				Contestants		
Song	Original Artist(s)	#	Name	Class	Score		Points	Position	Name	#	Name	Class	Score		Points	Position	Name
Song	Original Artist(s)	#	Name	Class	Total	Team	Points	Position	Name	#	Name	Class	Total	Team	Points	Position	Name
"Rising Sun" (순수)	TVXQ!	6	**라이징**~뀨 (Rising~kyu)	2 Star	1268	294	105	Main Vocal	**Sun Hengyu**	5	**Rising** Sunshine	2 Star	652	188	71	Main Vocal	Yusen
"Rising Sun" (순수)	TVXQ!	6	**라이징**~뀨 (Rising~kyu)	2 Star	1268	294	115	Sub Vocal 1	Andrew	5	**Rising** Sunshine	2 Star	652	188	60	Sub Vocal 1	Jiang Fan
"Rising Sun" (순수)	TVXQ!	6	**라이징**~뀨 (Rising~kyu)	2 Star	1268	294	117	Sub Vocal 2	Muhn Won-jun	5	**Rising** Sunshine	2 Star	652	188	66	Sub Vocal 2	Aoshi
"Rising Sun" (순수)	TVXQ!	6	**라이징**~뀨 (Rising~kyu)	2 Star	1268	294	141	Sub Vocal 3	Dang Hong Hai	5	**Rising** Sunshine	2 Star	652	188	40	Sub Vocal 3	Bian Shiyu
"Rising Sun" (순수)	TVXQ!	6	**라이징**~뀨 (Rising~kyu)	2 Star	1268	294	124	Main Rapper	Lee Dong-heon	5	**Rising** Sunshine	2 Star	652	188	57	Main Rapper	Yeom Ye-chan
"Rising Sun" (순수)	TVXQ!	6	**라이징**~뀨 (Rising~kyu)	2 Star	1268	294	84	Sub Rapper 1	Han Harry June	5	**Rising** Sunshine	2 Star	652	188	99	Sub Rapper 1	Kim Dong-yun
"Rising Sun" (순수)	TVXQ!	6	**라이징**~뀨 (Rising~kyu)	2 Star	1268	294	146	Sub Rapper 2	Masato	5	**Rising** Sunshine	2 Star	652	188	39	Sub Rapper 2	Taiga
"Rising Sun" (순수)	TVXQ!	6	**라이징**~뀨 (Rising~kyu)	2 Star	1268	294	142	Sub Rapper 3	Park Jun-il	5	**Rising** Sunshine	2 Star	652	188	32	Sub Rapper 3	Jang Tae-yoon
"S-Class" (특)	Stray Kids	2	**특**공대 (Special Forces)	All Star	1256	346	114	Main Vocal	Jo Gye-hyeon	1	국밥**특** (Gukbap Special)	1 Star	957	322	81	Main Vocal	Hu Hanwen
"S-Class" (특)	Stray Kids	2	**특**공대 (Special Forces)	All Star	1256	346	74	Sub Vocal 1	**Yoo Kang-min**	1	국밥**특** (Gukbap Special)	1 Star	957	322	120	Sub Vocal 1	Song Min-jae
"S-Class" (특)	Stray Kids	2	**특**공대 (Special Forces)	All Star	1256	346	136	Sub Vocal 2	Seo Won	1	국밥**특** (Gukbap Special)	1 Star	957	322	61	Sub Vocal 2	Kim Young-jun
"S-Class" (특)	Stray Kids	2	**특**공대 (Special Forces)	All Star	1256	346	111	Sub Vocal 3	Zhang Jiahao	1	국밥**특** (Gukbap Special)	1 Star	957	322	79	Sub Vocal 3	Ko Ming-chieh
"S-Class" (특)	Stray Kids	2	**특**공대 (Special Forces)	All Star	1256	346	118	Main Rapper	Kim Si-hwan	1	국밥**특** (Gukbap Special)	1 Star	957	322	72	Main Rapper	**Ham Hyun-seo**
"S-Class" (특)	Stray Kids	2	**특**공대 (Special Forces)	All Star	1256	346	84	Sub Rapper 1	Park Dong-gyu	1	국밥**특** (Gukbap Special)	1 Star	957	322	109	Sub Rapper 1	Chen Kaiwen
"S-Class" (특)	Stray Kids	2	**특**공대 (Special Forces)	All Star	1256	346	139	Sub Rapper 2	Kim Jun-min	1	국밥**특** (Gukbap Special)	1 Star	957	322	53	Sub Rapper 2	Zhao Guangxu
"S-Class" (특)	Stray Kids	2	**특**공대 (Special Forces)	All Star	1256	346	134	Sub Rapper 3	Kim In-hu	1	국밥**특** (Gukbap Special)	1 Star	957	322	60	Sub Rapper 3	Yang Da-wit
"Whiplash"	aespa	9	**W**in-**plash** (Note: Whiplash All Star Team won the benefit to perform on MCountdown and Studio Choom)	All Star	1093	336	125	Main Vocal	Zhou Anxin	10	**Aespa**rta	1 Star	956	280	58	Main Vocal	Fan Zheyi
"Whiplash"	aespa	9	**W**in-**plash**	All Star	1093	336	93	Sub Vocal 1	Lee Leo	10	**Aespa**rta	1 Star	956	280	87	Sub Vocal 1	Kim Daniel
"Whiplash"	aespa	9	**W**in-**plash**	All Star	1093	336	74	Sub Vocal 2	Hsu Ching-yu	10	**Aespa**rta	1 Star	956	280	106	Sub Vocal 2	Sun Jiayang
"Whiplash"	aespa	9	**W**in-**plash**	All Star	1093	336	125	Sub Vocal 3	Lee Sang-won	10	**Aespa**rta	1 Star	956	280	57	Sub Vocal 3	Lee Seung-baek
"Whiplash"	aespa	9	**W**in-**plash**	All Star	1093	336	117	Main Rapper	Kim Geon-woo	10	**Aespa**rta	1 Star	956	280	63	Main Rapper	Bang Jun-hyuk
"Whiplash"	aespa	9	**W**in-**plash**	All Star	1093	336	88	Sub Rapper 1	Kim Jun-seo	10	**Aespa**rta	1 Star	956	280	93	Sub Rapper 1	Peng Jinyu
"Whiplash"	aespa	9	**W**in-**plash**	All Star	1093	336	82	Sub Rapper 2	Yoon Min	10	**Aespa**rta	1 Star	956	280	93	Sub Rapper 2	**Kim Jae-hyun**
"Whiplash"	aespa	9	**W**in-**plash**	All Star	1093	336	53	Sub Rapper 3	**Yumeki**	10	**Aespa**rta	1 Star	956	280	119	Sub Rapper 3	Rensho
"Kill the Romeo"	Zerobaseone	8	**Kill the Romeo**	2 Star	1302	336	167	Main Vocal	Oh Jun-ho	7	Heart **Kill**er	1 Star	838	254	33	Main Vocal	Kim Hyeon-seo
"Kill the Romeo"	Zerobaseone	8	**Kill the Romeo**	2 Star	1302	336	118	Sub Vocal 1	**Xue Suren**	7	Heart **Kill**er	1 Star	838	254	76	Sub Vocal 1	Guo Zhen
"Kill the Romeo"	Zerobaseone	8	**Kill the Romeo**	2 Star	1302	336	135	Sub Vocal 2	Tatsuki	7	Heart **Kill**er	1 Star	838	254	63	Sub Vocal 2	Hong Zih-hao
"Kill the Romeo"	Zerobaseone	8	**Kill the Romeo**	2 Star	1302	336	141	Sub Vocal 3	Reeonn	7	Heart **Kill**er	1 Star	838	254	49	Sub Vocal 3	Chrisen Yang
"Kill the Romeo"	Zerobaseone	8	**Kill the Romeo**	2 Star	1302	336	79	Sub Vocal 4	Sen	7	Heart **Kill**er	1 Star	838	254	117	Sub Vocal 4	Kim Dong-hyun A
"Kill the Romeo"	Zerobaseone	8	**Kill the Romeo**	2 Star	1302	336	101	Main Rapper	Li Zihao	7	Heart **Kill**er	1 Star	838	254	87	Main Rapper	Sho
"Kill the Romeo"	Zerobaseone	8	**Kill the Romeo**	2 Star	1302	336	106	Sub Rapper 1	Zhang Shunyu	7	Heart **Kill**er	1 Star	838	254	87	Sub Rapper 1	Dong Jingkun
"Kill the Romeo"	Zerobaseone	8	**Kill the Romeo**	2 Star	1302	336	119	Sub Rapper 2	Yang Heui-chan	7	Heart **Kill**er	1 Star	838	254	72	Sub Rapper 2	He Zhongxing
"Plot Twist" (첫 만남은 계획대로 되지 않아)	TWS	3	**첫 만남** (First Meeting)	All Star	989	328	86	Main Vocal	Noh Hui-jun	4	**계획대로** (As Planned)	1 Star	1143	312	105	Main Vocal	Jang Han-eum
"Plot Twist" (첫 만남은 계획대로 되지 않아)	TWS	3	**첫 만남** (First Meeting)	All Star	989	328	64	Sub Vocal 1	Hong Zhihan	4	**계획대로** (As Planned)	1 Star	1143	312	125	Sub Vocal 1	Kang Woo-jin
"Plot Twist" (첫 만남은 계획대로 되지 않아)	TWS	3	**첫 만남** (First Meeting)	All Star	989	328	60	Sub Vocal 2	Chen Bowen	4	**계획대로** (As Planned)	1 Star	1143	312	121	Sub Vocal 2	**Jun Lee-jeong**
"Plot Twist" (첫 만남은 계획대로 되지 않아)	TWS	3	**첫 만남** (First Meeting)	All Star	989	328	92	Sub Vocal 3	Na Yun-seo	4	**계획대로** (As Planned)	1 Star	1143	312	95	Sub Vocal 3	Yi Chen
"Plot Twist" (첫 만남은 계획대로 되지 않아)	TWS	3	**첫 만남** (First Meeting)	All Star	989	328	93	Sub Vocal 4	Kim Tae-jo	4	**계획대로** (As Planned)	1 Star	1143	312	93	Sub Vocal 4	Arctic
"Plot Twist" (첫 만남은 계획대로 되지 않아)	TWS	3	**첫 만남** (First Meeting)	All Star	989	328	103	Sub Vocal 5	Jung Hyun-jun	4	**계획대로** (As Planned)	1 Star	1143	312	86	Sub Vocal 5	Chuei Li-yu
"Plot Twist" (첫 만남은 계획대로 되지 않아)	TWS	3	**첫 만남** (First Meeting)	All Star	989	328	55	Main Rapper	Nian Boheng	4	**계획대로** (As Planned)	1 Star	1143	312	132	Main Rapper	Chung Sang-hyeon
"Plot Twist" (첫 만남은 계획대로 되지 않아)	TWS	3	**첫 만남** (First Meeting)	All Star	989	328	108	Sub Rapper	He Xinlong	4	**계획대로** (As Planned)	1 Star	1143	312	74	Sub Rapper	Kim Dong-hyun B

== Class Takeover Position Battle (Episode 6-7) ==
This mission will have the contestants competing for All Star spots within their teams, in the position they're the most confident with, while having to create certain aspects of their performance from scratch. The dance position teams have to prove their presence as performers through choreography, the vocal position teams have to convey tone and emotion through arrangement, and the rap position teams have to express personality through original written rap. The All Star contestants and the Two Star contestants would combine to form the teams for each song, with each song having 1-3 spots for each class. The songs presented for each position are as follows: Rap - Smoke by Dynamic Duo and Lee Young-ji, Famous by AllDay Project, and Hot by 1TYM, Vocal - Breathe by Lee Hi, Run to You by Seventeen, Queencard by I-dle, and Rose Blossom by H1-Key, Dance - Bad by Christopher, XXL by Young Posse, Lalalala by Stray Kids, Like Jennie by Jennie, and Tambourine by Eve. The team compositions and song selections start with the All Stars, with 1st place from the First Survival Announcement choosing their song first, followed by the rest of the All Stars in ranking order. Following the All Stars, the Two Stars will choose their song, by challenging the All Stars in each song, in the order of the songs with the highest ranked All Star, with the All Stars getting the final choice out of the Two Stars that challenged them. The Killing Parts for this mission would be decided by the contestants themselves, with the final selections being done by the leader. All teams would have one week to prepare for their performances. The audience would vote for each contestant to determine the new All Stars within each team, using an X vs O choice based on the quality of each contestants performance. The new All Stars would be the highest ranked contestants of each team, with the number of new All Stars being equivalent to the old amount of All Stars from prior to the performances. All the contestants with an All Star class following the performances, and all the members of the winning team for each position, would each get some amount of benefit points. As an additional benefit, the team with the overall highest score would have the chance to perform on M Countdown, and would have an opportunity for an online fan meeting. After the performances, only 24 contestants would be able to move onto the next round. The 24 contestants who receive a final class of Two Star would be eliminated from the show.

Color key

Killing Part
Leader
Winning Team

Class Position Battle
#	Performance		Team		Contestants				
#	Song	Original Artist(s)	Name	Score	Old Class	Points	Position	Name	New Class
Vocal
10	"Breathe" (한숨)	Lee Hi	엘리멘탈 케어 (Elemental Care)	1230	2/3 stars	1330	Main Vocal	Jo Gye-hyeon	3/3 stars
10	"Breathe" (한숨)	Lee Hi	엘리멘탈 케어 (Elemental Care)	1230	3/3 stars	1280	Sub Vocal	Zhou Anxin	3/3 stars
10	"Breathe" (한숨)	Lee Hi	엘리멘탈 케어 (Elemental Care)	1230	3/3 stars	1030	Sub Vocal	Yoo Kang-min	2/3 stars
4	"Run to You" (지금 널 찾아가고 있어)	Seventeen	스타! 탐험대 (Star Expedition Team)	1040	2/3 stars	1340	Main Vocal	Yoon Min	3/3 stars
4	"Run to You" (지금 널 찾아가고 있어)	Seventeen	스타! 탐험대 (Star Expedition Team)	1040	3/3 stars	860	Sub Vocal	Kang Woo-jin	2/3 stars
4	"Run to You" (지금 널 찾아가고 있어)	Seventeen	스타! 탐험대 (Star Expedition Team)	1040	3/3 stars	1120	Sub Vocal	Sun Hengyu	3/3 stars
4	"Run to You" (지금 널 찾아가고 있어)	Seventeen	스타! 탐험대 (Star Expedition Team)	1040	2/3 stars	1000	Sub Vocal	Sen	2/3 stars
11	"Queencard" (퀸카)	I-dle	Queen Card 밴드 (Queencard Band)	1020	3/3 stars	910	Main Vocal	Lee Leo	2/3 stars
11	"Queencard" (퀸카)	I-dle	Queen Card 밴드 (Queencard Band)	1020	3/3 stars	1250	Sub Vocal	Chung Sang-hyeon	3/3 stars
11	"Queencard" (퀸카)	I-dle	Queen Card 밴드 (Queencard Band)	1020	2/3 stars	930	Sub Vocal	Kim Si-hwan	2/3 stars
11	"Queencard" (퀸카)	I-dle	Queen Card 밴드 (Queencard Band)	1020	2/3 stars	1150	Sub Vocal	Kim In-hu	3/3 stars
8	"Rose Blossom" (건물 사이에 피어난 장미)	H1-Key	건사피장 (Rose Blossom)	1350	3/3 stars	1480	Main Vocal	Jang Han-eum	3/3 stars
8	"Rose Blossom" (건물 사이에 피어난 장미)	H1-Key	건사피장 (Rose Blossom)	1350	3/3 stars	1130	Sub Vocal	Chuei Li-yu	2/3 stars
8	"Rose Blossom" (건물 사이에 피어난 장미)	H1-Key	건사피장 (Rose Blossom)	1350	2/3 stars	1220	Sub Vocal	Dang Hong Hai	2/3 stars
8	"Rose Blossom" (건물 사이에 피어난 장미)	H1-Key	건사피장 (Rose Blossom)	1350	2/3 stars	1350	Sub Vocal	Park Jun-il	3/3 stars
8	"Rose Blossom" (건물 사이에 피어난 장미)	H1-Key	건사피장 (Rose Blossom)	1350	2/3 stars	1310	Sub Vocal	Kim Dong-yun	2/3 stars
Dance
6	"Bad"	Christopher	Bad Guy	1290	3/3 stars	1310	Main Dancer	Kim Jun-seo	3/3 stars
6	"Bad"	Christopher	Bad Guy	1290	3/3 stars	1090	Sub Dancer	Masato	2/3 stars
6	"Bad"	Christopher	Bad Guy	1290	2/3 stars	1300	Sub Dancer	Park Dong-gyu	3/3 stars
1	"XXL"	Young Posse	XXS	1250	3/3 stars	1420	Main Dancer	Na Yun-seo	3/3 stars
1	"XXL"	Young Posse	XXS	1250	3/3 stars	1080	Sub Dancer	Sun Jiayang	2/3 stars
1	"XXL"	Young Posse	XXS	1250	2/3 stars	1040	Sub Dancer	Peng Jinyu	2/3 stars
1	"XXL"	Young Posse	XXS	1250	2/3 stars	1240	Sub Dancer	Arctic	3/3 stars
12	"Lalalala" (락; 樂)	Stray Kids	늑대 랑 너 (Wolves and You) (Note: Team Lalalala won the benefit to perform on MCountdown and the opportunity for an online fan meeting.)	1630	3/3 stars	1330	Main Dancer	He Xin-long	3/3 stars
12	"Lalalala" (락; 樂)	Stray Kids	늑대 랑 너 (Wolves and You)	1630	3/3 stars	1070	Sub Dancer	Fan Zheyi	3/3 stars
12	"Lalalala" (락; 樂)	Stray Kids	늑대 랑 너 (Wolves and You)	1630	3/3 stars	1310	Sub Dancer	Kim Geon-woo	3/3 stars
12	"Lalalala" (락; 樂)	Stray Kids	늑대 랑 너 (Wolves and You)	1630	2/3 stars	730	Sub Dancer	Chen Bowen	2/3 stars
12	"Lalalala" (락; 樂)	Stray Kids	늑대 랑 너 (Wolves and You)	1630	2/3 stars	930	Sub Dancer	Zhao Guangxu	2/3 stars
3	"Like Jennie"	Jennie	Like 잘난 (Like Badass)	1240	3/3 stars	1370	Main Dancer	Lee Sang-won	3/3 stars
3	"Like Jennie"	Jennie	Like 잘난 (Like Badass)	1240	3/3 stars	1090	Sub Dancer	Hsu Ching-yu	2/3 stars
3	"Like Jennie"	Jennie	Like 잘난 (Like Badass)	1240	2/3 stars	1230	Sub Dancer	Kim Jun-min	3/3 stars
3	"Like Jennie"	Jennie	Like 잘난 (Like Badass)	1240	2/3 stars	840	Sub Dancer	Jung Hyun-jun	2/3 stars
3	"Like Jennie"	Jennie	Like 잘난 (Like Badass)	1240	2/3 stars	1170	Sub Dancer	Han Harry June	2/3 stars
7	"Tambourine"	Eve	Shakeeez	1240	3/3 stars	1270	Main Dancer	Chen Kaiwen	3/3 stars
7	"Tambourine"	Eve	Shakeeez	1240	3/3 stars	720	Sub Dancer	Yumeki	2/3 stars
7	"Tambourine"	Eve	Shakeeez	1240	3/3 stars	1130	Sub Dancer	Zhang Jiahao	3/3 stars
7	"Tambourine"	Eve	Shakeeez	1240	2/3 stars	1140	Sub Dancer	Hu Hanwen	3/3 stars
7	"Tambourine"	Eve	Shakeeez	1240	2/3 stars	1120	Sub Dancer	Tatsuki	2/3 stars
7	"Tambourine"	Eve	Shakeeez	1240	2/3 stars	1070	Sub Dancer	Xue Suren	2/3 stars
Rap
5	"Smoke"	Dynamic Duo, Lee Young-ji	2YC	1250	3/3 stars	1260	Main Rapper	Yi Chen	2/3 stars
5	"Smoke"	Dynamic Duo, Lee Young-ji	2YC	1250	2/3 stars	1480	Sub Rapper	Yeom Ye-chan	3/3 stars
9	"Famous"	AllDay Project	페이~멋이쓰 (Famous & Cool)	1320	2/3 stars	1410	Main Rapper	Kim Jae-hyun	3/3 stars
9	"Famous"	AllDay Project	페이~멋이쓰 (Famous & Cool)	1320	3/3 stars	1030	Sub Rapper	Seo Won	2/3 stars
9	"Famous"	AllDay Project	페이~멋이쓰 (Famous & Cool)	1320	2/3 stars	1120	Sub Rapper	Kim Tae-jo	2/3 stars
2	"Hot" (Hot 뜨고)	1TYM	핫스팟 (Hot Spot)	1240	3/3 stars	900	Main Rapper	Nian Boheng	2/3 stars
2	"Hot" (Hot 뜨고)	1TYM	핫스팟 (Hot Spot)	1240	3/3 stars	1400	Sub Rapper	Jun Lee-jeong	3/3 stars
2	"Hot" (Hot 뜨고)	1TYM	핫스팟 (Hot Spot)	1240	2/3 stars	1130	Sub Rapper	Li Zihao	2/3 stars
2	"Hot" (Hot 뜨고)	1TYM	핫스팟 (Hot Spot)	1240	2/3 stars	1140	Sub Rapper	He Zhongxing	3/3 stars

== Debut Concept Battle (Episode 8-9) ==
This mission will have the contestants performing original songs, which will allow the contestants to picture themselves making a debut, with music to rightfully call their own. The contestants are presented with four songs, and with each their own concept; Hybrid Dance Hip-Hop - Lucky Macho, Midnight R&B Pop - Chains, Hybrid Pop - Sugar High, and Rock Hip-Hop - Main Dish. The contestants in each team are chosen by the fans, through a vote which took place from August 14-16, 2025. Initially, all 48 contestants would be organized into teams, and would start preparations, but following the 2nd Survival Announcement, once 24 contestants were eliminated, the teams would have to reorganize evenly and continue preparations from there. All teams would have around 2-3 weeks to prepare for their performances, including the time prior and post-eliminations. The winning team would get benefit points, with the first place contestant on said team receiving double the amount of points. As additional benefits, this winning team would have the chance to perform on M Countdown and the opportunity for an in-person fan meeting. Lastly, a vote was conducted on for 15 hours on September 11 into September 12, where the audience can stream the four new songs on major music streaming platforms in Korea, with the members of the team with the song that charted the highest receiving an additional points benefit.

Color key

Killing Part	Killing Part (Note: Prior to the Second Survival Announcement)
Leader	Leader and Killing Part
Winning Team	Contestant unable to perform

Debut Concept Battle
#	Performance			Team		Contestants				
#	Genre	Song	Production Credit (Note: Some contestants participated in the choreography production.)	Name	Score	Points	Position	Name	Status	Name
1	Hybrid Dance Hip-Hop	"Lucky Macho"	Lyrics & Composition: Benji Bae, Trippy; Choreography: Baek Koo-young, Kany	777 (Triple 7)	670	1730	Main Vocal	Park Dong-gyu	Eliminated	Nian Boheng
1	Hybrid Dance Hip-Hop	"Lucky Macho"	Lyrics & Composition: Benji Bae, Trippy; Choreography: Baek Koo-young, Kany	777 (Triple 7)	670	960	Sub Vocal 1	Park Jun-il (Note: Some contestants were shuffled around within teams after the Second Survival Announcement: Park Jun-il: Chains → Lucky Macho Kim Jun-seo, Yoo Kang-min, Sun Hengyu, Chen Kaiwen: Chains → Main Dish Hsu Chingyu: Sugar High → Main Dish)	Eliminated	Dang Hong Hai
1	Hybrid Dance Hip-Hop	"Lucky Macho"	Lyrics & Composition: Benji Bae, Trippy; Choreography: Baek Koo-young, Kany	777 (Triple 7)	670	1500	Sub Vocal 2	Hu Hanwen	Eliminated	Chen Bowen
1	Hybrid Dance Hip-Hop	"Lucky Macho"	Lyrics & Composition: Benji Bae, Trippy; Choreography: Baek Koo-young, Kany	777 (Triple 7)	670	1210	Main Rapper	He Xinlong	Eliminated	Kim Jae-hyun
1	Hybrid Dance Hip-Hop	"Lucky Macho"	Lyrics & Composition: Benji Bae, Trippy; Choreography: Baek Koo-young, Kany	777 (Triple 7)	670	1520	Sub Rapper 1	Yumeki	Eliminated	Arctic
1	Hybrid Dance Hip-Hop	"Lucky Macho"	Lyrics & Composition: Benji Bae, Trippy; Choreography: Baek Koo-young, Kany	777 (Triple 7)	670	1520	Sub Rapper 1	Yumeki	Eliminated	Xue Suren
1	Hybrid Dance Hip-Hop	"Lucky Macho"	Lyrics & Composition: Benji Bae, Trippy; Choreography: Baek Koo-young, Kany	777 (Triple 7)	670	1850	Sub Rapper 2	Kim Jun-min	Eliminated	Han Harry June
4	Midnight R&B Pop	"Chains"	Lyrics & Composition: Toyo, FRANTS, Avenue 52, SQVARE; Choreography: Baek Koo-young	Love Is	1110	1140	Main Vocal	Lee Leo	Eliminated	Sen
4	Midnight R&B Pop	"Chains"	Lyrics & Composition: Toyo, FRANTS, Avenue 52, SQVARE; Choreography: Baek Koo-young	Love Is	1110	1310	Sub Vocal 1	Zhou Anxin	Eliminated	
4	Midnight R&B Pop	"Chains"	Lyrics & Composition: Toyo, FRANTS, Avenue 52, SQVARE; Choreography: Baek Koo-young	Love Is	1110	1670	Sub Vocal 2	Kim Geon-woo	Eliminated	
4	Midnight R&B Pop	"Chains"	Lyrics & Composition: Toyo, FRANTS, Avenue 52, SQVARE; Choreography: Baek Koo-young	Love Is	1110	1430	Sub Vocal 3	Zhang Jiahao	Eliminated	
4	Midnight R&B Pop	"Chains"	Lyrics & Composition: Toyo, FRANTS, Avenue 52, SQVARE; Choreography: Baek Koo-young	Love Is	1110	1210	Main Rapper	Jun Lee-jeong	Eliminated	
4	Midnight R&B Pop	"Chains"	Lyrics & Composition: Toyo, FRANTS, Avenue 52, SQVARE; Choreography: Baek Koo-young	Love Is	1110	1820	Sub Rapper	Lee Sang-won	Eliminated	
2	Hybrid-Pop	"Sugar High"	Lyrics & Composition: iHwak, Mirror Boy, D.Ham, Choreography: Jrick	냥냥줍줍 (Nyangnyang Chuchu)	540	1680	Main Vocal	Jang Han-eum	Eliminated	Fan Zheyi
2	Hybrid-Pop	"Sugar High"	Lyrics & Composition: iHwak, Mirror Boy, D.Ham, Choreography: Jrick	냥냥줍줍 (Nyangnyang Chuchu)	540	1510	Sub Vocal 1	Kang Woo-jin	Eliminated	Sun Jiayang
2	Hybrid-Pop	"Sugar High"	Lyrics & Composition: iHwak, Mirror Boy, D.Ham, Choreography: Jrick	냥냥줍줍 (Nyangnyang Chuchu)	540	1540	Sub Vocal 2	Chuei Li-yu	Eliminated	Seo Won
2	Hybrid-Pop	"Sugar High"	Lyrics & Composition: iHwak, Mirror Boy, D.Ham, Choreography: Jrick	냥냥줍줍 (Nyangnyang Chuchu)	540	1180	Sub Vocal 3	Na Yun-seo	Eliminated	Tatsuki
2	Hybrid-Pop	"Sugar High"	Lyrics & Composition: iHwak, Mirror Boy, D.Ham, Choreography: Jrick	냥냥줍줍 (Nyangnyang Chuchu)	540	1630	Main Rapper	Chung Sang-hyeon	Eliminated	Jung Hyun-jun
2	Hybrid-Pop	"Sugar High"	Lyrics & Composition: iHwak, Mirror Boy, D.Ham, Choreography: Jrick	냥냥줍줍 (Nyangnyang Chuchu)	540	1360	Sub Rapper	Masato	Eliminated	
3	Rock Hip-Hop	"Main Dish"	Lyrics & Composition: Plave; Choreography: Baek Koo-young	Main Chef	440	1370	Main Vocal	Sun Hengyu	Eliminated	Yi Chen
3	Rock Hip-Hop	"Main Dish"	Lyrics & Composition: Plave; Choreography: Baek Koo-young	Main Chef	440	1370	Main Vocal	Sun Hengyu	Eliminated	Peng Jinyu
3	Rock Hip-Hop	"Main Dish"	Lyrics & Composition: Plave; Choreography: Baek Koo-young	Main Chef	440	790	Sub Vocal 1	Kim Jun-seo (Note: Kim Jun-seo was the leader of Chains prior to the Second Survival Announcement)	Eliminated	Zhao Guangxu
3	Rock Hip-Hop	"Main Dish"	Lyrics & Composition: Plave; Choreography: Baek Koo-young	Main Chef	440	790	Sub Vocal 1	Kim Jun-seo	Eliminated	He Zhongxing
3	Rock Hip-Hop	"Main Dish"	Lyrics & Composition: Plave; Choreography: Baek Koo-young	Main Chef	440	1930	Sub Vocal 2	Yoo Kang-min	Eliminated	Kim Dong-yun
3	Rock Hip-Hop	"Main Dish"	Lyrics & Composition: Plave; Choreography: Baek Koo-young	Main Chef	440	1930	Sub Vocal 2	Yoo Kang-min	Eliminated	Yeom Ye-chan
3	Rock Hip-Hop	"Main Dish"	Lyrics & Composition: Plave; Choreography: Baek Koo-young	Main Chef	440	1440	Main Rapper	Li Zihao	Eliminated	Jo Gye-hyeon
3	Rock Hip-Hop	"Main Dish"	Lyrics & Composition: Plave; Choreography: Baek Koo-young	Main Chef	440	1880	Sub Rapper 1	Chen Kaiwen	Eliminated	Kim Tae-jo
3	Rock Hip-Hop	"Main Dish"	Lyrics & Composition: Plave; Choreography: Baek Koo-young	Main Chef	440	1880	Sub Rapper 1	Chen Kaiwen	Eliminated	Kim Si-hwan
3	Rock Hip-Hop	"Main Dish"	Lyrics & Composition: Plave; Choreography: Baek Koo-young	Main Chef	440	1350	Sub Rapper 2	Hsu Ching-yu	Eliminated	Kim In-hu
3	Rock Hip-Hop	"Main Dish"	Lyrics & Composition: Plave; Choreography: Baek Koo-young	Main Chef	440	1350	Sub Rapper 2	Hsu Ching-yu	Eliminated	Yoon Min

== Final Debut Battle (Episode 10-11) ==
This final mission would have the contestants performing in teams the size of the debut group, using new songs made exclusively for them. The two new songs the contestants are presented with are 'Brat Attitude' and 'Never Been 2 Heaven'. The team and part selections for this mission start with the lowest ranking contestant, with higher ranking contestants being able to push anyone lower than them out of a position they want. If any contestant were to get pushed out, they wold have to wait until everyone else has chosen a part, then only then would they be able to stand before what song they prefer, with the contestants already in that team having to select those they want. The Killing Parts for this mission wouldn't be decided by the contestants themselves, rather the public audience would choose from two candidates selected by the contestants through peer review. All teams would have a little under two weeks to prepare for their performances. The contestants were not directly assessed based on their performances this time around, instead, after the performances, the members of the debut group selected through fan voting were announced.

Color key

Killing Part
Killing Part Candidate
Leader
Leader and Killing Part Candidate

Final Debut Battle
#	Performance		Contestants	
#	Song	Production Credit	Position	Name
1	"Brat Attitude"	Lyrics & Composition: SQVARE, Avenue 52, Rouno; Choreography: Baek Koo-young	Main Vocal	Chen Kaiwen
1	"Brat Attitude"	Lyrics & Composition: SQVARE, Avenue 52, Rouno; Choreography: Baek Koo-young	Sub Vocal 1	Park Dong-gyu
1	"Brat Attitude"	Lyrics & Composition: SQVARE, Avenue 52, Rouno; Choreography: Baek Koo-young	Sub Vocal 2	Chuei Li-yu
1	"Brat Attitude"	Lyrics & Composition: SQVARE, Avenue 52, Rouno; Choreography: Baek Koo-young	Sub Vocal 3	Kim Jun-seo
1	"Brat Attitude"	Lyrics & Composition: SQVARE, Avenue 52, Rouno; Choreography: Baek Koo-young	Main Rapper	Zhang Jiahao
1	"Brat Attitude"	Lyrics & Composition: SQVARE, Avenue 52, Rouno; Choreography: Baek Koo-young	Sub Rapper 1	He Xinlong
1	"Brat Attitude"	Lyrics & Composition: SQVARE, Avenue 52, Rouno; Choreography: Baek Koo-young	Sub Rapper 2	Chung Sang-hyeon
1	"Brat Attitude"	Lyrics & Composition: SQVARE, Avenue 52, Rouno; Choreography: Baek Koo-young	Sub Rapper 3	Yumeki
2	"Never Been 2 Heaven"	Lyrics & Composition: Didrik Thott, Greg Curtis, OLLIPOP; Choreography: Yoo Seung-hyun (Team Same)	Main Vocal	Zhou Anxin
2	"Never Been 2 Heaven"	Lyrics & Composition: Didrik Thott, Greg Curtis, OLLIPOP; Choreography: Yoo Seung-hyun (Team Same)	Sub Vocal 1	Lee Leo
2	"Never Been 2 Heaven"	Lyrics & Composition: Didrik Thott, Greg Curtis, OLLIPOP; Choreography: Yoo Seung-hyun (Team Same)	Sub Vocal 2	Lee Sang-won
2	"Never Been 2 Heaven"	Lyrics & Composition: Didrik Thott, Greg Curtis, OLLIPOP; Choreography: Yoo Seung-hyun (Team Same)	Sub Vocal 3	Kim Geon-woo
2	"Never Been 2 Heaven"	Lyrics & Composition: Didrik Thott, Greg Curtis, OLLIPOP; Choreography: Yoo Seung-hyun (Team Same)	Sub Vocal 4	Jun Lee-jeong
2	"Never Been 2 Heaven"	Lyrics & Composition: Didrik Thott, Greg Curtis, OLLIPOP; Choreography: Yoo Seung-hyun (Team Same)	Sub Vocal 5	Kang Woo-jin
2	"Never Been 2 Heaven"	Lyrics & Composition: Didrik Thott, Greg Curtis, OLLIPOP; Choreography: Yoo Seung-hyun (Team Same)	Main Rapper	Yoo Kang-min
2	"Never Been 2 Heaven"	Lyrics & Composition: Didrik Thott, Greg Curtis, OLLIPOP; Choreography: Yoo Seung-hyun (Team Same)	Sub Rapper	Kim Jun-min
