= 1st D Awards =

2025 South Korean music award ceremony

- Date: February 22, 2025
- Location: Korea University Hwajeong Gymnasium, Seoul
- Country: South Korea
- Hosted by: Go Min-si; Lee Jong-won

Highlights
- Most wins: Enhypen (5)

Television/radio coverage
- Network: Channel A

The 1st D Awards (Korean: 제1회 디 어워즈; RR: jeilhwe di owojeu; lit. 'The 1st D Awards') was an award ceremony held on February 22, 2025, at the Korea University Hwajeong Gymnasium. Go Min-si and Lee Jong-won served as hosts. It was organized by Sports Dong-a, a sister brand of the Dong-a Ilbo.

== Background and overview ==
In December 2024, The 1st D Awards was announced to be held at Korea University Hwajeong Gymnasium in South Korea in 2025 by Sports Dong-a. The judging criteria for D Awards are a comprehensive combination of online voting through Upick application, music and album sales, and judging by the judging panel. D Awards offers three varieties of trophies featuring hexahedron design, each in a distinct color derived from the awards' symbolic color: 'black' for the grand prizes (daesang), 'blue' for the main prizes and best sub-award categories (bonsang), and 'silver' for the emerging K-Pop artists.

On January 20, 2025, Go Min-si and Lee Jong-won was announced to host the event. The award ceremony was broadcast via Channel A on February 22, 2025, at 10:30 p.m. KST.

== Performers ==
The first performer lineup was announced on January 6. The second lineup was announced on January 13. The third lineup was announced on January 31.

Performances for Day 1
| Artist(s) | Song(s) performed |
|---|---|
| KickFlip | "Umm Great" "Mama Said" |
| Unis | "Superwoman" "Curious" |
| 82Major | "Stuck" "Thorns" |
| Young Posse | "XXL" "Scars" |
| QWER | "Soda" "T.B.H" |
| TripleS | "Girls Never Die" "Hit the Floor" |
| Fifty Fifty | "Cupid" "S.O.S" "Gravity" |
| P1Harmony | "It's Alright" "Sad Song" |
| N.Flying | "Flower Fantasy" "Star" "Blue Moon" |
| NCT Wish | "Wish" "Steady" |
| TWS | "Bang!" "Plot Twist" "Last Festival" |
| Zerobaseone | "Doctor! Doctor!" "Good So Bad" |
| Riize | "Hug" "Impossible" "Boom Boom Bass" |
| Enhypen | "Daydream" "No Doubt" "Scream" |

== Presenters ==
The first presenter lineup was announced on January 31. The second lineup was announced on February 11.

- Hwang Chan-sung – presented D Awards Remark
- Mimiminu – presented Dreams Silver Label
- Seo Bum-june – presented Dreams Silver Label
- Kangnam – presented Delights Blue Label
- Park Sun-joo – presented Delights Blue Label
- Bang Min-ah – presented D Awards Impact
- Jung Gun-joo – presented Delights Blue Label
- Lim Chan – presented Popularity Awards
- Lee Hak-joo – presented Delights Blue Label
- Cho Yi-hyun – presented Delights Blue Label
- Ko Kyung-pyo – presented Rookie of the Year
- Bae In-hyuk and Kim Ji-eun – presented Trend of the Year and Performance of the Year
- Park Jin-young and Roh Jeong-eui – presented Record of the Year and Song of the Year
- Ahn Eun-jin and Park Hyun-jin – presented D Awards Iconic
- Cha Seung-won – presented Album of the Year and Artist of the Year

== Winners and nominees ==
Winners are listed in alphabetical order and emphasized in bold.

=== Main Prize ===
| Artist of the Year | Song of the Year |
|---|---|
| **Seventeen** | **Aespa – "Supernova"** |
| Album of the Year | Record of the Year |
| **Enhypen – Romance: Untold** | **Zerobaseone – Cinema Paradise** |
| Performance of the Year | Trend of the Year |
| **Riize** | **QWER** |
| Rookie of the Year | D Awards Iconic |
| **NCT Wish**; **TWS** | **SM Entertainment** |

=== D Awards Specialty ===
'D Awards Delights' was given to the outstanding K-Pop artist throughout the year, while 'D Awards Dreamers' was given to the aspiring new K-Pop artist who will lead the industry in the future.

| Delights Blue Label | Dreams Silver Label |
|---|---|
| **Aespa**; **Day6**; **Enhypen**; **Fifty Fifty**; **Illit**; **N.Flying**; **NCT Wish**; **Nmixx**; **P1Harmony**; **QWER**; **Riize**; **Seventeen**; **Treasure**; **TripleS**; **TWS**; **Zerobaseone** | **82Major**; **Babymonster**; **Illit**; **NCT Wish**; **TWS**; **Unis**; **Young Posse** |
| **Aespa**; **Day6**; **Enhypen**; **Fifty Fifty**; **Illit**; **N.Flying**; **NCT Wish**; **Nmixx**; **P1Harmony**; **QWER**; **Riize**; **Seventeen**; **Treasure**; **TripleS**; **TWS**; **Zerobaseone** | D Awards Discovery of the Year |
| **Aespa**; **Day6**; **Enhypen**; **Fifty Fifty**; **Illit**; **N.Flying**; **NCT Wish**; **Nmixx**; **P1Harmony**; **QWER**; **Riize**; **Seventeen**; **Treasure**; **TripleS**; **TWS**; **Zerobaseone** | **82Major**; **Fifty Fifty**; **KickFlip**; **TripleS**; **Unis**; **Young Posse** |
| D Awards Impact | D Awards Remark |
| **Jo Yu-ri**; **Mimiminu**; **Seo Bum-june** | **KickFlip** |

=== Artists Awards ===
The award categories were announced daily on D Awards' social media accounts, starting a week before the event.

| Best Band | Best Choreography |
|---|---|
| **Day6**; **QWER** | **Illit**; **TWS** |
| Best Group | Best OST |
| **Enhypen**; **Riize** | **N.Flying** |
| Best Stage | Best Tour |
| **P1Harmony**; **Zerobaseone** | **Enhypen**; **Treasure** |
Best Video
**Aespa**; **Riize**

=== Popularity Awards ===
The popularity awards were determined through online voting on Upick. Voting for the six popularity categories took place from January 13 to February 13 and was conducted in multiple rounds.

Best Popularity Award
| Boy Solo | Girl Solo |
|---|---|
| **Lee Seung-yoon**; list of nominees: Lee Seung-gi; Ten; Kim Jae-joong; JD1; Baekhyun; Jungkook; Jin; Jimin; Lee Chan-won; Yugyeom; Chanyeol; V; Bambam; J-Hope; Hwiyoung; Baekho; D.O.; Suga; RM; and many more | **Wendy**; list of nominees: IU; Jeon Yu-jin; Tzuyu; Yuqi; Jihyo; Jennie; Kim Se-jeong; Irene; Lisa; Nayeon; Kim Eui-young; Jisoo; Hynn; Yena; Rosé; Hong Ji-yun; Jung Seo-joo; Miyeon; Bae A-hyun; and many more |
| Boy Group | Girl Group |
| **Enhypen**; list of nominees: BTS; EXO; Zerobaseone; Seventeen; Omega X; TWS; Stray Kids; Nexz; Plave; 82Major; Riize; BAE173; NCT; P1Harmony; Got7; N.Flying; Tomorrow X Together; NCT Wish; MCND; and many more | **TripleS**; list of nominees: Le Sserafim; Unis; Twice; Vvup; Izna; Qwer; Everglow; Fifty Fifty; Blackpink; Babymonster; X:IN; NiziU; XG; Mamamoo; Nmixx; Aespa; Red Velvet; Meovv; NewJeans; and many more |
UPICK Global Choice
| Boy | Girl |
| **Zhang Hao (Zerobaseone)**; list of nominees: Kim Ji-woong (Zerobaseone); Ni-Ki (Enhypen); Lee Know (Stray Kids); Sehun (EXO); Chenle (NCT); Sung Han-bin (Zerobaseone); Joshua (Seventeen); Jimin (BTS); V (BTS); Sungchan (Riize); Yeonjun (TXT); Hanbin (Tempest); Sunoo (Enhypen); Heeseung (Enhypen); Nicholas (&Team); J-Hope (BTS); Chanyeol (EXO); Yuma (&Team); Shinyu (TWS); Noah (Plave); Shotaro (Riize); Yushi (NCT Wish); Hong Sungmin (Fantasy Boys); Renjun (NCT); Bang Chan (Stray Kids); I.N (Stray Kids); Doyoung (NCT); Hangyul (BAE173); Yook Sung-jae (BTOB); and many more | **Chaeyoung (Twice)**; list of nominees: Gehlee (Unis); Summer (Odd Youth); Pharita (Babymonster); Choi Jung-eun (Izna); Kotoko (Unis); Karina (Aespa); Sakura (Le Sserafim); Kim Chae-won (Le Sserafim); Athena (Fifty Fifty); Jeongyeon(Twice); Mashiro (Madein); Mina (Twice); Wendy (Red Velvet); Jang Won-young (Ive); Elisia (Unis); Mako (NiziU); Chiquita (Babymonster); Bang Jeemin (Izna); Miyeon ((G)I-dle); Rosé (Blackpink); YooA (Oh My Girl); Kim (VVUP); Irene (Red Velvet); Sullyoon (Nmixx); Minji (NewJeans); Chanelle Moon (Fifty Fifty); Wonhee (Illit); Park Sohyun (TripleS); Chodan (QWER); and many more |

== Multiple awards ==
The following artists has received two or more awards:

| Count | Artist(s) |
|---|---|
| 5 | Enhypen |
| 4 | Riize |
| 4 | TWS |
| 4 | Zerobaseone |
| 3 | Aespa |
| 3 | NCT Wish |
| 3 | Illit |
| 3 | QWER |
| 3 | TripleS |
| 2 | 82Major |
| 2 | Day6 |
| 2 | Fifty Fifty |
| 2 | KickFlip |
| 2 | N.Flying |
| 2 | P1Harmony |
| 2 | Seventeen |
| 2 | Treasure |
| 2 | Unis |
| 2 | Young Posse |
