= On (single album) =

Single album by 82Major
- Released: October 11, 2023
- Genre: K-pop
- Length: 9:24
- Languages: Korean; English
- Label: FNC Entertainment

82Major chronology
On (2023)	Beat by 82 (2024)

Singles from On
- 1. "First Class" Released: October 11, 2023

On is the debut single album by South Korean boy band 82Major. It was released on October 11, 2023, by Great M Entertainment. The album consists of three tracks, including the title track, "First Class".

== Themes and lyrics ==
Marking the start of the boys' journey is On, a two-track album consisting of "Sure Thing" and "First Class," two songs of contrasting sound and energy. On signifies our 'start.' The members took part in writing the lyrics of the two songs to better portray our honest hearts," Cho Seong-il explained.

We're essentially a hip-hop group consisting of hip-hop musicians. All of us can write raps and we hope to infuse elements of K-pop into hip-hop with our music.

— Nam Sung-mo talking about expounding on the group's identity.

== Commercial performance ==
The single album sold 23,791+ copies in South Korea. It peaked at number 27 on the Circle Album Chart.

== Track listing ==
No.	Title	Length
1.	"First Class"	3:12
2.	"Sure Thing"	3:21
3.	"Sure Thing" ((Sped Up))	2:48
Total length:		9:21
