= 82Major =

South Korean boy band

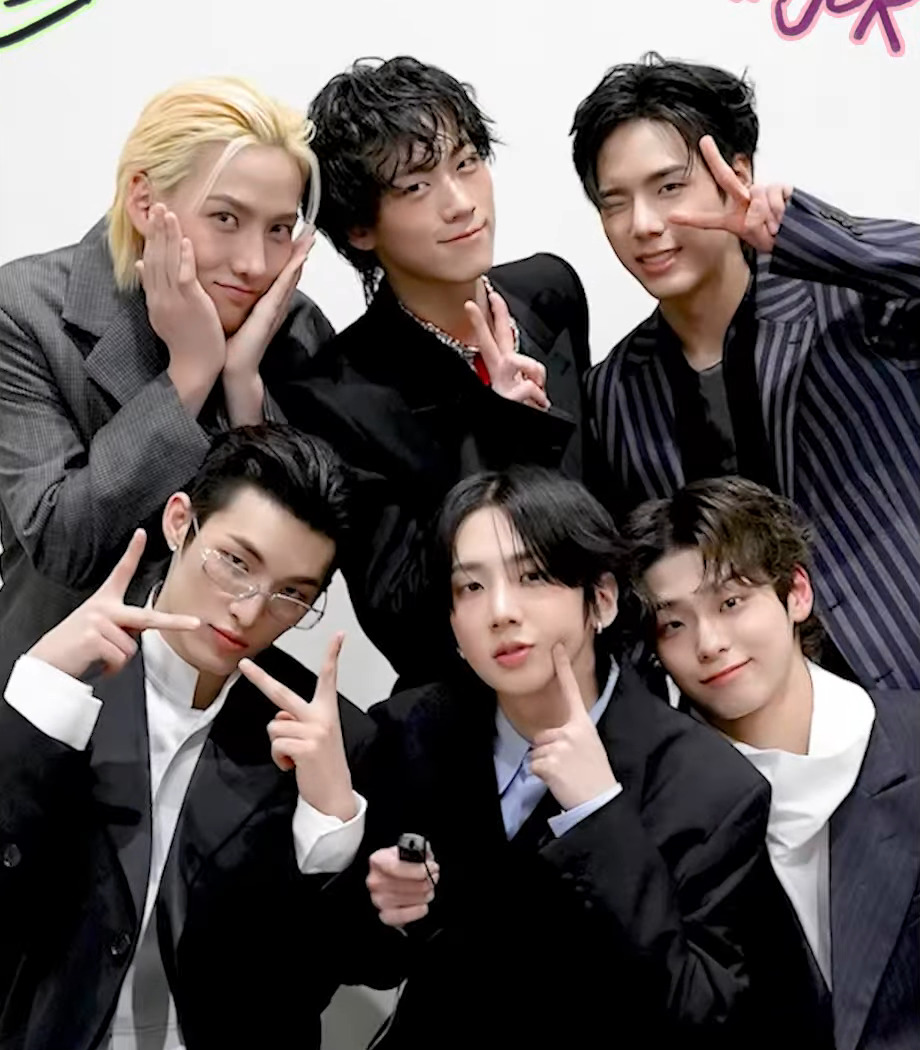
- 82Major in 2025; Top, L–R: Cho Seong-il, Park Seok-joon, Hwang Seong-bin; Bottom, L–R: Yoon Ye-chan, Nam Seong-mo, Kim Do-gyun

Background information
- Origin: Seoul, South Korea
- Genres: K-pop; hip-hop
- Years active: 2023–present
- Label: Great M
- Members: Cho Seong-il; Yoon Ye-chan; Nam Seong-mo; Hwang Seong-bin; Park Seok-joon; Kim Do-gyun
- Website: greatment.co.kr/82MAJOR

82Major (Korean: 에이티투메이저; RR: Eititumeijeo; stylized in all caps) is a South Korean boy band formed by Great M Entertainment. The group consists of six members: Cho Seong-il, Yoon Ye-chan, Nam Seong-mo, Hwang Seong-bin, Park Seok-joon, and Kim Do-gyun. They debuted on October 11, 2023, with their debut single album On.

== Name ==
The group's name is a combination of South Korea's calling code and the word major, which refers to their desire to become a boyband that represents Korea.

== History ==
=== 2023–2024: Debut with On and 82 series ===
On September 12, 2023, South Korean entertainment company Great M Entertainment announced the forthcoming debut of their first boy group in October. Ahead of their official debut, 82Major released the pre-release track "Sure Thing". 82Major debuted on October 11 with the single album On, featuring "Sure Thing" and a new song "First Class".

82Major released their first EP on April 28, 2024, titled Beat by 82 with the lead single "Choke". On May 1, Great M Entertainment announced that the group would be embarking on a world tour in the second half of the year.

On September 13, 2024, 82Major announced that they would released their second EP, X-82, along with the lead single "Stuck" on October 15.

=== 2025–present: Silence Syndrome ===
On March 19, 2025, Great M announced that 82Major would released a new album on April 14. Two days later, the group revealed the EP's title to be Silence Syndrome along with the scheduler.

On September 1, 2026, 82Major released their second single album Heat. Its lead single "Like Fire" gave them their first music show win on Show Champion, three years after debut, on September 9.

== Members ==
- Cho Seong-il (조성일) – leader
- Yoon Ye-chan (윤예찬)
- Nam Seong-mo (남성모)
- Hwang Seong-bin (황성빈)
- Park Seok-joon (박석준)
- Kim Do-gyun (김도균)

== Discography ==
=== Extended plays ===
List of extended plays, showing selected details, selected chart positions and sales figures
Title	Details	Peak chart positions			Sales
Title	Details	KOR	JPN	US World	Sales
Beat by 82	Released: April 29, 2024; Label: Great M; Formats: CD, digital download, streaming; Track list: 1. "Choke" (촉); 2. "Birthday"; 3. "Illegal"; 4. "82"	22	—	—	KOR: 33,101
X-82	Released: October 15, 2024; Label: Great M; Formats: CD, digital download, streaming; Track list: 1. "Stuck" (혀끝); 2. "Thorns" (가시밭길도 괜찮아); 3. "Face Time"; 4. "Gossip"	9	—	15	KOR: 57,700
Silence Syndrome	Released: April 14, 2025; Label: Great M; Formats: CD, digital download, streaming; Track listing: 1. "Takeover" (뭘 봐); 2. "Heroes" (영웅호걸); 3. "Passport"; 4. "Promise You"	4	—	—	KOR: 70,898
Trophy	Released: October 30, 2025; Label: Great M; Formats: CD, digital download, streaming; Track listing: 1. "Trophy" (트로피); 2. "Say More"; 3. "Suspicious"; 4. "Need That Bass"	7	—	—	KOR: 113,789
Feelm	Released: April 28, 2026; Label: Great M; Formats: CD, digital download, streaming; Track listing: 1. "W.T.F"; 2. "Sign"; 3. "Cage"; 4. "Circles"; 5. "Yessir!"	10	42	—	KOR: 117,698; JPN: 726
"—" denotes a recording that did not chart or was not released in that territory

=== Single albums ===
List of single albums, showing selected details, selected chart positions and sales figures
Title	Details	Peak chart positions	Sales
Title	Details	KOR	Sales
On	Released: October 11, 2023; Label: Great M; Formats: CD, digital download, streaming; Track listing: 1. "First Class"; 2. "Sure Thing"; 3. "Sure Thing" (Sped Up)	27	KOR: 23,791
Heat	Released: September 1, 2026; Label: Great M; Formats: CD, digital download, streaming; Track listing: 1. "Like Fire"; 2. "WYD?" (오늘 어때); 3. "Trophy" (트로피; Spanish version); 4. "Sign" (Viann remix)	3	KOR: 137,403

=== Singles ===
List of singles, showing year released, selected chart positions, and name of the album
Title	Year	Peak chart positions	Album
Title	Year	KOR Down.	Album
"Sure Thing"	2023	—	On
"First Class"	2023	—	On
"Choke" (촉)	2024	—	Beat by 82
"Stuck" (혀끝)	2024	166	X-82
"Take Over"	2025	57	Silence Syndrome
"Trophy" (트로피)	2025	95	Trophy
"Sign"	2026	72	FeelM
"Like Fire"	2026	28	Heat
"—" denotes a recording that did not chart or was not released in that territory

== Videography ==
=== Music videos ===
Title	Year	Director	Ref.
"Sure Thing"	2023	Lee Hyun-ji (Kinoflow)	
"First Class"	2023	Woogie Kim (MOTHER)	
"Choke"	2024	Woogie Kim (MOTHER)	
"Stuck"	2024	Woogie Kim (MOTHER)	

== Awards and nominations ==
Name of the award ceremony, year presented, award category, nominee(s) and the result of the award
Award ceremony	Year	Category	Nominee/work	Result	Ref.
D Awards	2025	Dreams Silver Label	82Major	Won	
D Awards	2025	Discovery of the Year	82Major	Won	
iHeartRadio Music Awards	2026	Best New Artist (K-pop)	82Major	Nominated	
MAMA Awards	2024	Artist of the Year	82Major	Nominated	
MAMA Awards	2024	Best New Male Artist	82Major	Nominated	
