= Young Posse =

South Korean girl group

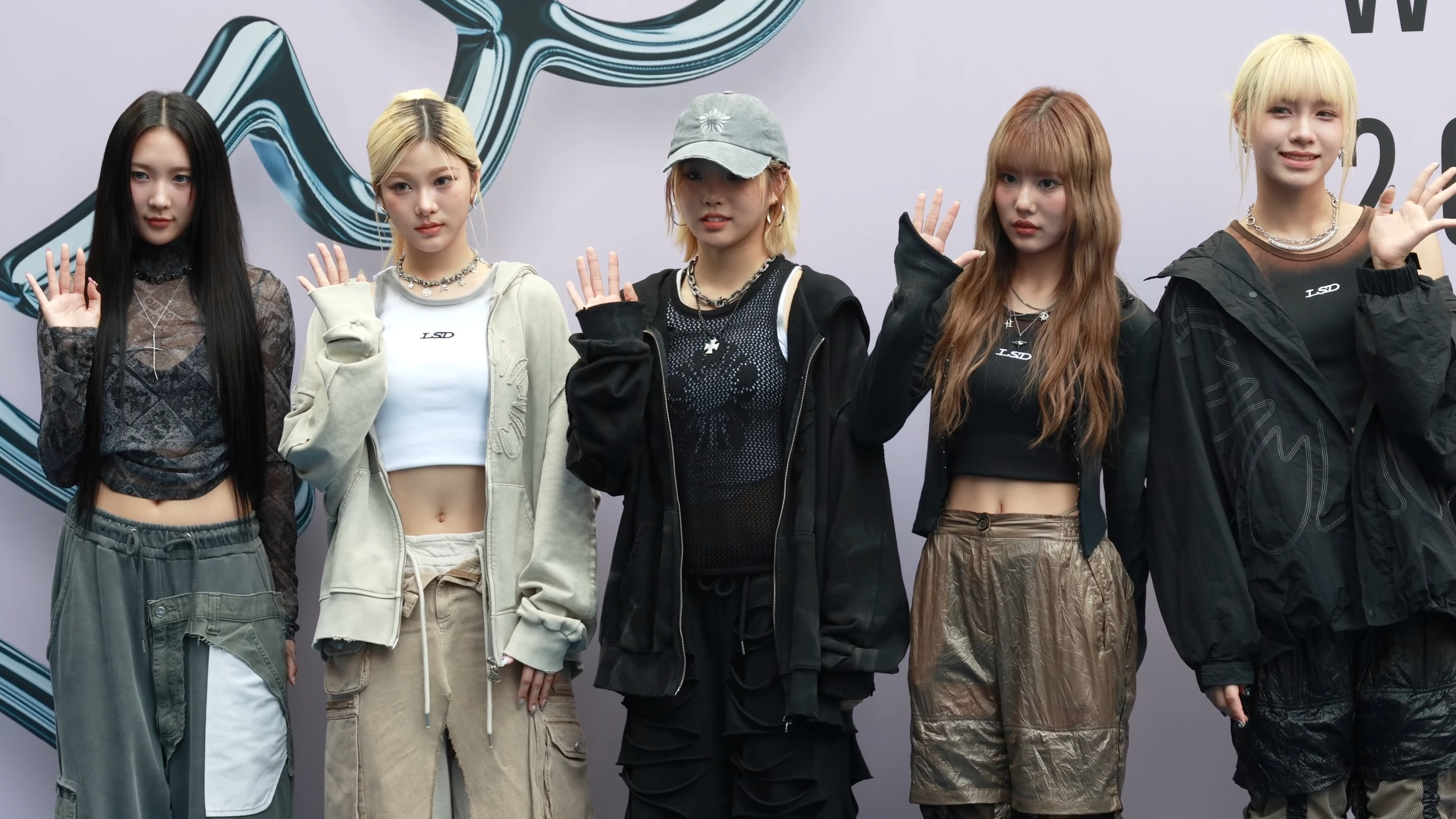
- Young Posse in September 2024; L–R: Yeonjung, Jiana, Sunhye, Jieun, and Doeun

Background information
- Origin: Seoul, South Korea
- Genre: K-pop
- Years active: 2023–present
- Labels: DSP; Beats
- Members: Sunhye; Yeonjung; Jiana; Doeun; Jieun
- Website: Official website

Young Posse (Korean: 영파씨; RR: Yeongpassi; stylized in all caps) is a South Korean girl group under DSP Media and co-produced by Beats Entertainment, an independent record label. The group consists of members Sunhye, Yeonjung, Jiana, Doeun, and Jieun. They made their debut on October 18, 2023, with the extended play Macaroni Cheese.

== Name ==
Young Posse's official logo

The name Young Posse is derived from the Latin word "posse" which means "be able to". Together, the name represents "a young group (of girls) gathered together with a purpose".

== History ==
=== 2023–present: Debut with Macaroni Cheese ===
On June 22, 2023, DSP Media announced the debut of a new five-member girl group in collaboration with Beats Entertainment around the second half of the year, their first girl group since April (2015). The name of the group, Young Posse, was revealed on July 12. The group then appeared at the label concert of RBW, DSP's parent company, on July 16. On September 19, a teaser video for the group's debut was released. The group released their debut EP Macaroni Cheese along with the music video for the lead single of the same name on October 18.

On February 4, 2024, Young Posse released the digital single "Young Posse Up" - a remix of the track "Posse Up!" from their first EP Macaroni Cheese. The remix involved the likes of NSW Yoon, Token and Verbal Jint. On March 20, Young Posse released their second EP XXL along with the lead single of the same name. The group's third EP, Ate That, was released on August 21. On October 18, the group released their first remix album, titled We Still Loading, to commemorate their first anniversary since debut. The remix album is led by the single of the same name, which is a remixed version of the track "Loading..." from the group's third EP Ate That, and also includes the instrumental versions of the group's previously released singles. On December 13, Young Posse released the digital Christmas single "Street Carol" (ㄱㅓ리에서) with John Park. The track "Santa Claus is Coming to Hood", originally planned to be included as part of a double title track for the single, was scrapped on December 9 as a response to fans' criticisms.

On March 2, 2025, Young Posse released the special album Cold, featuring 10cm in the lead single of the same name. They released their fourth EP Growing Pain Pt.1: Free on August 14, the first project in their Growing Pain series. The EP is supported by the lead single "Freestyle", which was released on the same day.

On January 10, 2026, Young Posse released the single "Lose Your Shxt", a collaboration with the Chinese rapper Benzo, ahead of their upcoming official comeback. They then released the digital single "Visa / Pilot3" on January 27, featuring its two title tracks. The music video for "Visa" was released on the same day. On April 7, Young Posse released the digital single "We Don't Go to Bed Tonight", featuring the title track and five other tracks in the form of the title track broken down into five parts; drum, bass, synth and acapella. The music video was released on the same day.

== Members ==
- Sunhye (선혜) – leader
- Yeonjung (연정)
- Jiana (지아나)
- Doeun (도은)
- Jieun (지은)

== Discography ==
=== Studio albums ===
List of studio albums, showing selected details, selected chart positions, and sales figures
Title	Details	Peak chart positions	Sales
Title	Details	KOR	Sales
Cold	Released: March 2, 2025; Label: DSP Media, Beats; Formats: CD, digital download, streaming; Track listing: 1. "Cold" (featuring 10cm); 2. "Lovestagram"; 3. "Blue Dot"; 4. "Daddy Don't Leave Me"; 5. "Santa Claus Left Me No Goodz"; 6. "Oskar's Drawing"; 7. "Cold" (YPS Colder version)	8	KOR: 21,046

=== Mixtapes ===
List of mixtapes, showing selected details.
Title	Details
Young Tape	Released: July 13, 2026; Label: DSP Media, Beats; Formats: Digital download, streaming; Track listing: 1. "Mr 2026"; 2. "HopeYouFuckUp."; 3. "No Sleep"; 4. "I Know"; 5. "Kawa"; 6. "Need U"; 7. "0nline_x3" 8. "Too Sunny (feat. Danji)"; 9. "Sweettttttt;3"; 10. "Don't Say My Name (feat. Eric Minz)"; 11. "Distance (feat. Danji)"; 12. "Pilot2"

=== Extended plays ===
List of extended plays, showing selected details, selected chart positions, and sales figures
Title	Details	Peak chart positions	Sales
Title	Details	KOR	Sales
Macaroni Cheese	Released: October 18, 2023; Label: DSP Media, Beats; Formats: CD, digital download, streaming; Track listing: 1. "Posse Up!"; 2. "Macaroni Cheese"; 3. "OTB"; 4. "Cooing"	60	KOR: 3,271
XXL	Released: March 20, 2024; Label: DSP Media, Beats; Formats: CD, digital download, streaming; Track listing: 1. "Scars"; 2. "XXL"; 3. "DNB" (ft. BM of Kard); 4. "Roty" (나의이름은); 5. "Sky Line"	49	KOR: 5,018
Ate That	Released: August 21, 2024; Label: DSP Media, Beats; Formats: CD, digital download, streaming; Track listing: 1. "Loading..."; 2. "Ate That"; 3. "Bananas"; 4. "Umbrella" (화약)	22	KOR: 15,218
Growing Pain Pt.1: Free	Released: August 14, 2025; Label: DSP Media, Beats; Formats: CD, digital download, streaming; Track listing: 1. "YSSR"; 2. "Freestyle"; 3. "ADHD"; 4. "School's Out"; 5. "Mon3y 8ank" 6. "Soju"; 7. "Same Shit, Another One"	14	KOR: 11,043

=== Remix albums ===
List of remix albums, showing selected details.
Title	Details
We Still Loading	Released: October 18, 2024; Label: DSP Media, Beats; Formats: Digital download, streaming

=== Singles ===
List of singles, showing year released, selected chart positions, and name of the album
Title	Year	Peak chart positions	Album
Title	Year	KOR DL	Album
"Macaroni Cheese"	2023	185	Macaroni Cheese
"Young Posse Up"	2024	—	Non-album single
"XXL"	2024	82	XXL
"On My Scars" (featuring Lil Cherry and Dbo)	2024	195	Non-album single
"Ate That"	2024	41	Ate That
"We Still Loading" (featuring Los, Rick Bridges, Northfacegawd, and DJ Sky)	2024	—	We Still Loading
"Street Carol" (ㄱㅓ리에서) (with John Park)	2024	188	Non-album single
"Cold" (featuring 10cm)	2025	81	Cold
"Freestyle"	2025	63	Growing Pain Pt.1: Free
"Lose Your Shxt" (with Benzo)	2026	—	Non-album singles
"Visa" (Note: "Visa" and "Pilot3" were released together as part of the digital single "Visa / Pilot3".)	2026	58	Non-album singles
"Pilot3"	2026	—	Non-album singles
"We Don't Go to Bed Tonight"	2026	104	Non-album singles
"—" denotes a recording that did not chart or was not released in that territory

=== Soundtrack appearances ===
List of soundtrack appearances, showing year released, selected chart positions, and name of the album
Title	Year	Peak chart positions	Album
Title	Year	KOR DL	Album
"Upside Down"	2025	90	Head over Heels OST

=== Other charted songs ===
List of other charted songs, showing year released, selected chart positions, and name of the album
Title	Year	Peak chart positions	Album
Title	Year	KOR DL	Album
"Loading..."	2024	142	Ate That
"Bananas"	2024	158	Ate That
"Umbrella"	2024	155	Ate That

== Videography ==
=== Music videos ===
List of songs, showing year released, name of the directors, and the length of the music videos
Title	Year	Director(s)	Length	Ref.
"Macaroni Cheese"	2023	Ben Proulx	3:08	
"OTB"	2023	Unknown	1:34	
"Young Posse Up" (ft. Verbal Jint, NSW Yoon, Token)	2024	Dump Flush	3:21	
"XXL"	2024	Ben Proulx	3:38	
"Ate That"	2024	Ben Proulx	3:50	
"Cold"	2025	Remii Huang	5:41	
"Freestyle"	2025	Nany Kim	2:26	
"YSSR"	2025	Nim G. Nas	2:08	
"ADHD"	2025	위연정 (Wi Yeon-jung)	3:58	
"Lose Your Shxt" (Young Posse × Benzo)	2026	Sunny Inspires & Ben Proulx	3:19	
"Visa"	2026	Kyowa	3:26	
"Pilot3" (feat. Koonta)	2026	Unknown	3:41	
"We Don't Go to Bed Tonight"	2026	Korlio	3:12	
"미스터 2026 (Mr 2026)"	2026	Doeun	2:28	

== Awards and nominations ==
Name of the award ceremony, year presented, award category, nominee(s) of the award, and the result of the nomination
Award ceremony	Year	Category	Nominee(s)/work(s)	Result	Ref.
D Awards	2025	Discovery of the Year	Young Posse	Won	
D Awards	2025	Dreams Silver Label	Young Posse	Won	
D Awards	2025	Best Girl Group Popularity Award	Young Posse	Longlisted	
The Fact Music Awards	2024	Hot Potential Award	Young Posse	Won	
MAMA Awards	2024	Artist of the Year	Young Posse	Nominated	
MAMA Awards	2024	Fans' Choice Female	Young Posse	Nominated	
MAMA Awards	2024	Best New Female Artist	Young Posse	Nominated	
Seoul Music Awards	2024	Rookie of the Year	Young Posse	Nominated	
