= Girls Never Die =

- Japanese version cover

Single by TripleS

from the album Assemble24
- Released: May 8, 2024
- Recorded: February 22, 2024
- Genre: Future bass; hip-hop
- Length: 3:07
- Label: Modhaus; The Orchard
- Songwriter: Jaden Jeong
- Producers: El Capitxn; EL CAPITXN; Maria Marcus; ARINEH KARIMI; Vendors (ZENUR); Vendors (Nano); Vendors (COLL!N); Vendors (JNX's); Jongsoo Kim

TripleS singles chronology
"Rising" (2023)	"Girls Never Die" (2024)	"###" (Hash) (2024)

Music video
- "Girls Never Die" on YouTube

"Girls Never Die" is a song by South Korean girl group TripleS. It was released by Modhaus on May 8, 2024, as the lead single of their first studio album, Assemble24. Musically, "Girls Never Die" was described as a future bass genre based on hip-hop grooves, with heavy bass sounds and dreamy vocals and rap.

== Background and release ==
On February 3 and 4, 2024, TripleS held their concert entitled "tripleS Authentic in Seoul". The first day featured performances by two sub-units, Lovelution and Evolution. The second day featured all 20 members that had been introduced. TripleS also announced in the concert that the full group composed of 24 members will debut with "Assemble24".

On April 1, 2024, TripleS announced their final four members, started with the 21st member Kim Chae-won. This was followed with the introduction of the group's 22nd, 23rd and 24th members Sullin, Seoah, and Jiyeon to complete the group's full line-up. The four members aforementioned would be under one of the group's new unit Glow, for potential future activities.

TripleS made their full team debut with the first studio album, Assemble24, on May 8, 2024. The album contains ten tracks with the lead single "Girls Never Die". The full group took their first music show win on May 14, 2024, through The Show.

In December 2024, a Chinese version of "Girls Never Die" was performed by members Xinyu, Kaede, Kotone, and Lynn during the 2024 Guangzhou Strawberry Music Festival. A Japanese version of the song was also released digitally on April 12, 2025.

== Composition ==
"Girls Never Die" was written and composed by Jaden Jeong alongside El Capitxn with Vendors, and Maria Marcus participating in the composition and arrangement. It was described as a dance song with "up-tempo house beat characterized by rock guitar", with lyrics about "achieving anything even if there are difficulties if we are not afraid of challenging ourselves with healthy and bold energy". "Girls Never Die" was composed in the key of B minor, with a tempo of 95 beats per minute.

== Commercial performance ==
"Girls Never Die" debuted at number 78 on South Korea's Circle Digital Chart in the chart issue dated June 19–25, 2022.

== Credits and personnel ==
Credits adapted from Melon.

- TripleS – vocals
- Adora - background vocals
- Jaden Jeong – lyrics
- Kim Sung-woo – lyrics
- El Capitxn – lyrics, composition, arrangement
- Vendors (Nano) – composition, arrangement
- Maria Marcus – composition
- Louise Frick Sveen – composition
- Minjeong Woo – digital editing, recording engineer (at doobdoob studio)
- Taeseob Lee – mixing (at gateway studio)
- Namwoo Kwon — mastering (at 821 Sound Mastering)

== Accolades ==
On South Korean music programs, "Girls Never Die" achieved first place wins on the May 14 episode of The Show.

== Charts ==
=== Weekly charts ===
Weekly chart performance
Chart (2022)	Peak position
South Korea (Circle)	27

=== Monthly charts ===
Monthly chart performance
Chart (2024)	Position
South Korea (Circle)	75

=== Year-end charts ===
Year-end chart performance
Chart (2024)	Position
South Korea (Circle)	104

== Release history ==
Release history and formats for "Girls Never Die"
Region	Date	Format	Version	Label
South Korea	May 8, 2024	Digital download; streaming; promotional CD	Original	Modhaus; The Orchard
Various	May 8, 2024	Digital download; streaming; promotional CD	Original	Modhaus; The Orchard
Various	April 12, 2025	Digital download; streaming	Japanese	Modhaus
