= XXL (Young Posse song) =

Single by Young Posse

from the EP XXL
- Language: Korean
- Released: March 20, 2024
- Genre: Old-school hip hop
- Length: 2:32
- Label: Beats
- Songwriters: Kiggen; Rick Bridges
- Producers: Kiggen; Rick Bridges

Young Posse singles chronology
"Young Posse Up" (2024)	"XXL" (2024)	"On My Scars" (2024)

Music video
- "XXL" on YouTube

"XXL" is a song recorded by South Korean girl group Young Posse. It was released by Beast Entertainment on March 20, 2024, as the lead single for their second extended play (EP) of the same name.

== Background and release ==
On March 4, 2024, Beats Entertainment announced Young Posse's second EP, XXL, slated to be released on March 20. The release schedule was revealed a day later, followed by the track listing on March 7, with "XXL" announced as the lead single. Concept photos were released on March 9, showcasing the members in outfits reminiscence of 90s hip-hop. On March 19, a teaser for the music video for the song was released. The song was released digitally on March 20, along with its music video.

== Composition ==
"XXL" was co-written and composed by Kiggen and Rick Bridges. Musically, the song is described as an old-school hip hop song which pays homage to the song "Come Back Home" by the 90s Korean hip-hop group Seo Taiji and Boys.

== Credits and personnel ==
Adapted from Melon credits:

- Young Posse – vocals
- Kiggen – lyrics, composition, arrangement
- Rick Bridges – lyrics, composition, arrangement

== Charts ==
Chart performance for "XXL"
Chart (2024)	Peak position
South Korea Download (Circle)	82
