= List of My Teenage Girl contestants =

My Teenage Girl was a South Korean reality television show created by Munhwa Broadcasting Corporation. The show was intended to form a seven-member girl group with the potential to chart on Billboard. Out of 30,000 applications submitted around the world, 83 applicants were chosen to participate in the show and were divided into four age groups known as "grades". The contestants finishing in the top seven formed CLASS:y.

== Contestants ==
The spelling of names in English is according to the official website. The Korean contestants are presented in Eastern order (family name, given name).

The age listed is according to the Korean age system at the start of the competition.

Color Key

Top 7
Final members of Classy
Eliminated in the final episode
Eliminated in the sixth elimination round
Eliminated in the fifth elimination round
Eliminated in the fourth elimination round
Eliminated in the third elimination round
Eliminated in the second elimination round (Performance)
Eliminated in the second elimination round (Mid-point check)
Eliminated in the first elimination round
Left the show

Grade	Name		Age	Ranking												
Grade	Name		Age	Mentors	Studio Audience and Online											
Grade	Name		Age	Ep. 1-3	Ep. 4	Ep. 7	Jan. 19, 2022	Ep. 9		Jan. 24, 2022	Jan. 31, 2022	Feb. 7, 2022	Feb. 14, 2022	Ep. 11	Ep. 12	
Grade	Romanization	Hangul	Age	Votes	#	#	#	#	Points	#	#	#	#	#	#	Points
Grade 1	Kim Seonyou	김선유	13	4	5	12 (↓7)	6 (↑6)	8 (↓2)	663	5 (↑3)	7 (↓2)	1 (↑6)	1 (=)	6 (↓5)	2 (↑4)	241,778.9
Grade 1	Park Boeun	박보은	13	4	6	5 (↑1)	3 (↑2)	2 (↑1)	733	3 (↓1)	3 (=)	6 (↓3)	3 (↑3)	3 (=)	6 (↓3)	201,684.4
Grade 1	Yoon Seungjoo	윤승주	12	4	29	26 (↑3)	20 (↑6)	16 (↑4)	456	17 (↓1)	16 (↑1)	16 (=)	15 (↑1)	19 (↓4)	Eliminated	
Grade 1	Kim Subeen	김수빈	14	4	25	18 (↑7)	22 (↓4)	18 (↑3)	416.6	20 (↓2)	18 (↑2)	19 (↓1)	19 (=)	21 (↓2)	Eliminated	
Grade 1	Choi Soobin	최수빈	13	3	20	24 (↓4)	23 (↑1)	23 (=)	374	Eliminated						
Grade 1	Sung Minchae	성민채	12	4	32	28 (↑4)	25 (↑3)	25 (=)	277	Eliminated						
Grade 1	Bohme Sara	보미세라	14	4	21	32 (↓11)	28 (↑4)	26 (↑2)	275	Eliminated						
Grade 1	Oh Yoojin	오유진	14	4	17	21 (↓4)	24 (↓3)	28 (↓4)	217	Eliminated						
Grade 1	Jung Yuju	정유주	14	4	26	34 (↓8)	Eliminated									
Grade 1	Jung Siwoo	정시우	13	3	38	36 (↑2)	Eliminated									
Grade 1	Kim Minsol	김민솔	13	3	Eliminated											
Grade 1	Ko Eunchae	고은채	14	3	Eliminated											
Grade 1	Lee Siyul	이시율	14	3	Eliminated											
Grade 1	Kim Minjoo	김민주	14	3	Eliminated											
Grade 1	Park Haneum	박한음	14	3	Eliminated											
Grade 1	Kim Jungyun	김정윤	13	2	Eliminated											
Grade 1	Choi Dasol	최다솔	13	0	Eliminated											
Grade 1	Kim Yumin	김유민	13	0	Eliminated											
Grade 2	Won Jimin	원지민	15	4	7	9 (↓2)	7 (↑2)	7 (=)	670	6 (↑1)	4 (↑2)	5 (↓1)	6 (↓1)	7 (↓1)	1 (↑6)	243,302.4
Grade 2	Kim Riwon	김리원	16	4	4	3 (↑1)	5 (↓2)	5 (=)	699	4 (↑1)	5 (↓1)	3 (↑2)	4 (↓1)	5 (↓1)	5 (=)	209,053.9
Grade 2	Lee Youngchae	이영채	16	3	10	10 (=)	12 (↓2)	12 (=)	479	12 (=)	13 (↓1)	14 (↓1)	13 (↑1)	12 (↑1)	9 (↑3)	164,287.6
Grade 2	Minami	미나미	16	4	9	8 (↑1)	11 (↓3)	10 (↑1)	578	11 (↓1)	12 (↓1)	13 (↓1)	14 (↓1)	11 (↑3)	13 (↓2)	87,851.3
Grade 2	Cho Sui	조수이	15	3	35	31 (↑4)	26 (↑5)	24 (↑2)	333	Eliminated						
Grade 2	Choi Sarang	최사랑	15	4	28	30 (↓2)	27 (↑3)	27 (=)	221	Eliminated						
Grade 2	Karina Takei	타케이 카리나	15	2	36	27 (↑9)	29 (↓2)	29 (=)	183	Eliminated						
Grade 2	Lee Jiwon	이지원	16	-	19	29 (↓10)	30 (↓1)	30 (=)	119	Eliminated						
Grade 2	Park Hyowon	박효원	16	3	39	35 (↑4)	Eliminated									
Grade 2	Ju Hyorin	주효린	16	4	27	Eliminated										
Grade 2	Park Yoora	박유라	16	4	Eliminated											
Grade 2	Lee Hadam	이하담	16	4	Eliminated											
Grade 2	Lee Sumin	이수민	15	3	Eliminated											
Grade 2	Hina Fukumoto	후쿠모토 히나	15	2	Eliminated											
Grade 2	Lee Seoyoon	이서윤	16	2	Eliminated											
Grade 2	Lee Seungeun	이승은	16	2	Eliminated											
Grade 2	Pak Jinhyun	박진현	16	1	Eliminated											
Grade 2	Kim Seojin	김서진	16	0	Eliminated											
Grade 2	Kim Yeseo	김예서	16	0	Eliminated											
Grade 2	Cho Eun	조은	15	-	Eliminated											
Grade 2	Oh Jinkyoung	오진경	15	-	Eliminated											
Grade 2	Kim Sujin	김수진	15	-	Eliminated											
Grade 2	Kwon Juan	권주안	15	-	Eliminated											
Grade 3	Kim Hyunhee	김현희	17	4	1	4 (↓3)	10 (↓6)	4 (↑6)	701	8 (↓4)	8 (=)	9 (↓1)	10 (↓1)	10 (=)	11 (↓1)	148,918.6
Grade 3	Kim Yunseo	김윤서	18	3	2	6 (↓4)	8 (↓2)	9 (↓1)	640	10 (↓1)	11 (↓1)	11 (=)	11 (=)	8 (↑3)	12 (↓4)	146,454.9
Grade 3	Choi Yoonjung	최윤정	18	4	11	11 (=)	17 (↓6)	13 (↑4)	476	13 (=)	15 (↓2)	15 (=)	16 (↓1)	14 (↑2)	14 (=)	21,818.7
Grade 3	Lee Taerim	이태림	17	4	15	14 (↑1)	18 (↓4)	21 (↓3)	381	18 (↑3)	19 (↓1)	18 (↑1)	18 (=)	17 (↑1)	Eliminated	
Grade 3	Lee Jiwoo	이지우	17	4	12	13 (↓1)	19 (↓6)	20 (↓1)	410	21 (↓1)	21 (=)	21 (=)	21 (=)	18 (↑3)	Eliminated	
Grade 3	Oh Jieun	오지은	17	4	18	20 (↓2)	21 (↓1)	17 (↑5)	439	16 (↑1)	17 (↓1)	17 (=)	17 (=)	20 (↓3)	Eliminated	
Grade 3	Kim Suhye	김수혜	18	4	14	22 (↓8)	Eliminated									
Grade 3	Ryou Jayhyun	유재현	18	3	31	25 (↑6)	Eliminated									
Grade 3	Park Hyolim	박효림	17	2	24	Eliminated										
Grade 3	Kim Minji	김민지	17	4	40	Eliminated										
Grade 3	Koo Hyunkyoung	구현경	17	4	Eliminated											
Grade 3	Shin Yeseul	신예슬	18	4	Eliminated											
Grade 3	Kim Jiyeon	김지연	17	3	Eliminated											
Grade 3	Kim Nahyun	김나현	17	3	Eliminated											
Grade 3	Choi Yunju	최윤주	17	3	Eliminated											
Grade 3	Kim Lina	김리나	17	3	Eliminated											
Grade 3	Cho Yeju	조예주	18	3	Left the show											
Grade 3	Kim Minseo	김민서	18	1	Eliminated											
Grade 3	Lee Pureun	이푸른	17	1	Eliminated											
Grade 3	Lee Jaye	이재이	18	-	Eliminated											
Grade 4	Myung Hyungseo	명형서	21	4	8	7 (↑1)	4 (↑3)	6 (↓2)	695	7 (↓1)	6 (↑1)	7 (↓1)	7 (=)	4 (↑3)	3 (↑1)	217,370
Grade 4	Hong Hyeju	홍혜주	19	3	23	19 (↑4)	14 (↑5)	15 (↓1)	458	15 (=)	14 (↑1)	10 (↑4)	9 (↑1)	13 (↓4)	4 (↑9)	210,647.9
Grade 4	Yoon Chaewon	윤채원	20	4	13	1 (↑12)	1 (=)	1 (=)	912	2 (↓1)	2 (=)	4 (↓2)	5 (↓1)	1 (↑4)	7 (↓6)	198,915.5
Grade 4	Kim Yooyeon	김유연	22	1	3	2 (↑1)	2 (=)	3 (↓1)	720	1 (↑2)	1 (=)	2 (↓1)	2 (=)	2 (=)	8 (↓6)	181,442.3
Grade 4	Lee Mihee	이미희	22	3	16	16 (=)	9 (↑7)	11 (↓2)	559	9 (↑2)	10 (↓1)	12 (↓2)	12 (=)	9 (↑3)	10 (↓1)	160,199.3
Grade 4	Kim Inhye	김인혜	19	4	33	23 (↑10)	13 (↑10)	14 (↓1)	469	14 (=)	9 (↑5)	8 (↑1)	8 (=)	15 (↓7)	Eliminated	
Grade 4	Kim Hari	김하리	25	3	22	15 (↑7)	15 (=)	19 (↓4)	415	19 (=)	20 (↓1)	20 (=)	20 (=)	16 (↑4)	Eliminated	
Grade 4	Song Yerim	송예림	22	-	34	17 (↑17)	16 (↑1)	22 (↓6)	375	Eliminated						
Grade 4	Lee Yumin	이유민	19	3	30	33 (↓3)	Eliminated									
Grade 4	Kim Dasom	김다솜	20	3	37	Eliminated										
Grade 4	Kang Minji	강민지	21	4	Eliminated											
Grade 4	Lee Hayoung	이하영	20	4	Eliminated											
Grade 4	Choe Sumin	최수민	19	3	Eliminated											
Grade 4	Go Taehui	고태희	20	3	Eliminated											
Grade 4	Jeon Youeun	전유은	20	3	Eliminated											
Grade 4	Jo Yujeong	조유정	22	2	Eliminated											
Grade 4	Bang Sunhee	방선희	20	2	Eliminated											
Grade 4	Kim Suyeon	김수연	19	2	Eliminated											
Grade 4	Wei Yi	웨이	23	1	Eliminated											
Grade 4	Zhuang Yihan	장이한	22	1	Eliminated											
Grade 4	Lee Subin	이수빈	19	0	Eliminated											
Grade 4	Kang Eunwoo	강은우	20	-	Eliminated											

== Entrance Mission (Episodes 1–3) ==
The teams were formed based on age groups prior to the prequel season. Initially, a total of 10 contestants from each group would move on to the second mission. After a long discussion, it was ultimately decided that instead of 10 contestants, they would all have 16 each in order to match Grade 3 (the group with the most passers in the first mission). This allowed other groups to bring back contestants who were originally eliminated. As a result, one contestant returned to Grade 1; five to Grade 2; and three to Grade 4, bringing a total of 64 passers for the first round of the first mission.

Color key

Passed Mentors' Evaluation
Revived for Mid-Point Check
Failed Mentors' Evaluation
Failed Audiences' Votes

=== Grade 1 ===
Grade 1
Performance			Contestant	Result		
#	Artist	Song	Name	Judge	Mentor	Revival
1	Jennie	"Solo"	Park Bo-eun	PASS	4	-
1	Jennie	"Solo"	Jung Si-woo	PASS	3	-
2	Celeb Five	"I wanna be a Celeb"	Kim Su-been	PASS	4	-
2	Celeb Five	"I wanna be a Celeb"	Choi Su-bin	PASS	3	-
3	CLC	"Helicopter"	Jung Yu-ju	PASS	4	-
4	Spice Girls	"Wannabe"	Bohme Sara	PASS	4	-
4	Spice Girls	"Wannabe"	Kim Min-sol	PASS	3	-
4	Spice Girls	"Wannabe"	Kim Jung-yun	PASS	2	PASS
5	NCT 127	"Kick It"	Sung Min-chae	PASS	4	-
5	NCT 127	"Kick It"	Yoon Seung-joo	PASS	4	-
6	2NE1	"Fire"	Choi Da-sol	PASS	0	FAIL
6	2NE1	"Fire"	Kim Min-joo	PASS	3	-
6	2NE1	"Fire"	Kim Yu-min	PASS	0	FAIL
6	2NE1	"Fire"	Oh Yoo-jin	PASS	4	-
7	Taemin	"Goodbye"	Lee Si-yul	PASS	3	-
8	Seo Taiji and Boys	"Anyhow Song"	Kim Seon-you	PASS	4	-
8	Seo Taiji and Boys	"Anyhow Song"	Ko Eun-chae	PASS	3	-
9	Jeon Somi	"What You Waiting For"	Park Han-eum	PASS	3	-

=== Grade 2 ===
Grade 2
Performance			Contestant	Result		
#	Artist	Song	Name	Judge	Mentor	Revival
1	Red Velvet – Irene & Seulgi	"Monster"	Ju Hyo-rin	PASS	4	-
1	Red Velvet – Irene & Seulgi	"Monster"	Won Ji-min	PASS	4	-
2	Seventeen	"Very Nice"	Lee Seo-yoon	PASS	2	PASS
2	Seventeen	"Very Nice"	Park Jin-hyun	PASS	1	FAIL
2	Seventeen	"Very Nice"	Park Yoo-ra	PASS	4	-
2	Seventeen	"Very Nice"	Cho Su-i	PASS	3	-
3	Oh My Girl	"Nonstop"	Kim Seo-jin	PASS	0	FAIL
3	Oh My Girl	"Nonstop"	Kim Ye-seo	PASS	0	FAIL
4	Girls' Generation	"Genie"	Minami	PASS	4	-
4	Girls' Generation	"Genie"	Karina Takei	PASS	2	PASS
4	Girls' Generation	"Genie"	Hina Fukumoto	PASS	2	PASS
5	Blackpink	"Kill This Love"	Kim Ri-won	PASS	4	-
5	Blackpink	"Kill This Love"	Lee Seung-eun	PASS	2	PASS
5	Blackpink	"Kill This Love"	Lee Young-chae	PASS	3	-
5	Blackpink	"Kill This Love"	Park Hyo-won	PASS	3	-
5	Blackpink	"Kill This Love"	Lee Ha-dam	PASS	4	-
6	Lee Hi	"No One"	Lee Su-min	PASS	3	-
7	Jessi	"What Type of X"	Choi Sa-rang	PASS	4	-
8	Jeon Somi	"Birthday"	Oh Jin-kyoung	FAIL	-	FAIL
8	Jeon Somi	"Birthday"	Cho Eun	FAIL	-	FAIL
8	Jeon Somi	"Birthday"	Kwon Ju-an	FAIL	-	FAIL
8	Jeon Somi	"Birthday"	Lee Ji-won	FAIL	-	PASS
8	Jeon Somi	"Birthday"	Kim Su-jin	FAIL	-	FAIL

=== Grade 3 ===
Grade 3
Performance			Contestant	Result	
#	Artist	Song	Name	Judge	Mentor
1	Chungha	"Bicycle"	Kim Hyun-hee	PASS	4
1	Chungha	"Bicycle"	Oh Ji-eun	PASS	4
2	Mino	"Fiancé"	Kim Ji-yeon	PASS	3
3	4Minute	"Crazy"	Choi Yoon-jung	PASS	4
3	4Minute	"Crazy"	Cho Ye-ju	PASS	3
3	4Minute	"Crazy"	Kim Min-ji	PASS	4
4	Imagine Dragons	"Believer"	Lee Tae-rim	PASS	4
5	Fin.K.L	"Now"	Kim Li-na	PASS	3
5	Fin.K.L	"Now"	Park Hyo-lim	PASS	2
5	Fin.K.L	"Now"	Kim Su-hye	PASS	4
5	Fin.K.L	"Now"	Ryou Jay-hyun	PASS	3
6	After School	"Bang!"	Lee Pu-reun	PASS	1
6	After School	"Bang!"	Kim Min-seo	PASS	1
6	After School	"Bang!"	Choi Yun-ju	PASS	3
6	After School	"Bang!"	Koo Hyun-kyoung	PASS	4
6	After School	"Bang!"	Shin Ye-seul	PASS	4
7	Blackpink (feat. Selena Gomez)	"Ice Cream"	Kim Yun-seo	PASS	3
7	Blackpink (feat. Selena Gomez)	"Ice Cream"	Lee Ji-woo	PASS	4
8	Brave Girls	"Deepened"	Kim Na-hyun	PASS	3
9	MC Lyte	"Ruffneck"	Lee Ja-ye	FAIL	-

Notes

No revival for Grade 3

=== Grade 4 ===
Grade 4
Performance			Contestant	Result		
#	Artist	Song	Name	Judge	Mentor	Revival
1	(G)I-dle	"Latata"	Myung Hyung-seo	PASS	4	-
1	(G)I-dle	"Latata"	Kim Ha-ri	PASS	3	-
1	(G)I-dle	"Latata"	Wei Yi	PASS	1	FAIL
1	(G)I-dle	"Latata"	Choe Su-min	PASS	3	-
1	(G)I-dle	"Latata"	Zhuang Yi-han	PASS	1	FAIL
2	Chungha	"Gotta Go"	Jo Yu-jeong	PASS	2	PASS
2	Chungha	"Gotta Go"	Lee Su-bin	PASS	0	FAIL
2	Chungha	"Gotta Go"	Bang Sun-hee	PASS	2	FAIL
3	Marshmello and Anne-Marie	"Friends"	Lee Mi-hee	PASS	3	-
3	Marshmello and Anne-Marie	"Friends"	Hong Hye-ju	PASS	3	-
4	Bishop Briggs	"River"	Kang Eun-woo	FAIL	-	FAIL
4	Bishop Briggs	"River"	Song Ye-rim	FAIL	-	PASS
5	Nikki Yanofsky	"Something New"	Lee Ha-young	PASS	4	-
5	Nikki Yanofsky	"Something New"	Kang Min-ji	PASS	4	-
5	Nikki Yanofsky	"Something New"	Kim Su-yeon	PASS	2	FAIL
6	Sunmi	"Gashina"	Kim Yoo-yeon	PASS	1	PASS
6	Sunmi	"Gashina"	Yoon Chae-won	PASS	4	-
6	Sunmi	"Gashina"	Jeon You-eun	PASS	3	-
7	Kim Sung-jae	"As I Told You"	Go Tae-hui	PASS	3	-
7	Kim Sung-jae	"As I Told You"	Lee Yu-min	PASS	3	-
7	Kim Sung-jae	"As I Told You"	Kim In-hye	PASS	4	-
7	Kim Sung-jae	"As I Told You"	Kim Da-som	PASS	3	-

== Mid-Point Check (Episodes 3 and 4) ==
Before the performance in the second mission, only 40 contestants (10 from each group) would perform in the second mission, forcing the mentors to eliminate 24 contestants (6 from each group) from the show.

Color key

Passed Mentors' Evaluation
Failed Mentors' Evaluation

=== Grade 1 ===
Grade 1
Park Bo-eun	Jung Si-woo	Kim Su-been	Choi Su-bin
Jung Yu-ju	Bohme Sara	Kim Min-sol	Kim Jung-yun
Sung Min-chae	Yoon Seung-joo	Kim Min-joo	Oh Yoo-jin
Lee Si-yul	Kim Seon-you	Ko Eun-chae	Park Han-eum

=== Grade 2 ===
Grade 2
Ju Hyo-rin	Won Ji-min	Lee Seo-yoon	Park Yoo-ra
Cho Su-i	Minami	Karina Takei	Hina Fukumoto
Kim Ri-won	Lee Seung-eun	Lee Young-chae	Park Hyo-won
Lee Ha-dam	Lee Su-min	Choi Sa-rang	Lee Ji-won

=== Grade 3 ===
Grade 3
Kim Hyun-hee	Oh Ji-eun	Kim Ji-yeon	Choi Yoon-jung
Kim Min-ji	Lee Tae-rim	Kim Li-na	Kim Su-hye
Ryou Jay-hyun	Choi Yun-ju	Koo Hyun-kyoung	Shin Ye-seul
Kim Yun-seo	Lee Ji-woo	Kim Na-hyun	Park Hyo-lim

Notes

Park Hyo-lim replaced Cho Ye-ju before the mid-point check, the latter of which left the show due to a neck injury.

=== Grade 4 ===
Grade 4
Myung Hyung-seo	Kim Ha-ri	Choe Su-min	Jo Yu-jeong
Lee Mi-hee	Hong Hye-ju	Song Ye-rim	Lee Ha-young
Kang Min-ji	Kim Yoo-yeon	Yoon Chae-won	Jeon You-eun
Go Tae-hui	Lee Yu-min	Kim In-hye	Kim Da-som

== Grade Battle (Episodes 4 and 5) ==
Rules: The two contestants receiving the highest scores in their respective groups competed against each other in a second round known as the "Ace Battle". The two contestants receiving the lowest scores in their respective groups were nominated for elimination. The winning group was exempt from elimination and would be determined by adding the total scores from both rounds in the second mission. The nominee in the losing group was eliminated from the show.

Color Key

Winning Team
Ace (Highest Vote)
Elimination Candidate (Lowest Vote)
Eliminated Contestant (Losing Team)

=== Grade 3 vs Grade 4 ===
Grade 3 vs Grade 4
Round	Song	Artists						Song
Round	Song	Individual Rank	Grade 3		Grade 4		Individual Rank	Song
First Round	"Pretty Savage" by Blackpink	1st	Choi Yoon-jung	492 votes	634 votes	Yoon Chae-won	1st	"Black Mamba" by Aespa
First Round	"Pretty Savage" by Blackpink	2nd	Kim Yun-seo	492 votes	634 votes	Hong Hye-ju	2nd	"Black Mamba" by Aespa
First Round	"Pretty Savage" by Blackpink	3rd	Ryou Jay-hyun	492 votes	634 votes	Myung Hyung-seo	3rd	"Black Mamba" by Aespa
First Round	"Pretty Savage" by Blackpink	4th (Tie)	Kim Hyun-hee	492 votes	634 votes	Lee Mi-hee	4th	"Black Mamba" by Aespa
First Round	"Pretty Savage" by Blackpink	4th (Tie)	Kim Su-hye	492 votes	634 votes	Kim Yoo-yeon	5th	"Black Mamba" by Aespa
First Round	"Pretty Savage" by Blackpink	6th	Lee Ji-woo	492 votes	634 votes	Kim Ha-ri	6th	"Black Mamba" by Aespa
First Round	"Pretty Savage" by Blackpink	7th (Tie)	Oh Ji-eun	492 votes	634 votes	Kim In-hye	7th	"Black Mamba" by Aespa
First Round	"Pretty Savage" by Blackpink	7th (Tie)	Lee Tae-rim	492 votes	634 votes	Lee Yu-min	8th	"Black Mamba" by Aespa
First Round	"Pretty Savage" by Blackpink	9th	Park Hyo-lim	492 votes	634 votes	Song Ye-rim	9th	"Black Mamba" by Aespa
First Round	"Pretty Savage" by Blackpink	10th	Kim Min-ji	492 votes	634 votes	Kim Da-som	10th	"Black Mamba" by Aespa
Second Round	ACE		Choi Yoon-jung	520 votes	700 votes	Yoon Chae-won	ACE	
Total Score	Grade 3			1012 votes	1334 votes	Grade 4		
Result: Grade 4 (Winner)

=== Grade 2 vs Grade 1 ===
Grade 2 vs Grade 1
Round	Song	Artists						Song
Round	Song	Individual Rank	Grade 2		Grade 1		Individual Rank	Song
First Round	"Wannabe" by Itzy	1st	Kim Ri-won	528 votes	538 votes	Kim Seon-you	1st	"Adios" by Everglow
First Round	"Wannabe" by Itzy	2nd	Won Ji-min	528 votes	538 votes	Kim Su-been	2nd	"Adios" by Everglow
First Round	"Wannabe" by Itzy	3rd	Lee Young-chae	528 votes	538 votes	Park Bo-eun	3rd (Tie)	"Adios" by Everglow
First Round	"Wannabe" by Itzy	4th	Minami	528 votes	538 votes	Jung Yu-ju	3rd (Tie)	"Adios" by Everglow
First Round	"Wannabe" by Itzy	5th	Cho Su-i	528 votes	538 votes	Choi Su-bin	5th	"Adios" by Everglow
First Round	"Wannabe" by Itzy	6th	Park Hyo-won	528 votes	538 votes	Jung Si-woo	6th	"Adios" by Everglow
First Round	"Wannabe" by Itzy	7th	Karina Takei	528 votes	538 votes	Bohme Sara	7th (Tie)	"Adios" by Everglow
First Round	"Wannabe" by Itzy	8th	Lee Ji-won	528 votes	538 votes	Yoon Seung-joo	7th (Tie)	"Adios" by Everglow
First Round	"Wannabe" by Itzy	9th	Choi Sa-rang	528 votes	538 votes	Sung Min-chae	9th	"Adios" by Everglow
First Round	"Wannabe" by Itzy	10th	Ju Hyo-rin	528 votes	538 votes	Oh Yoo-jin	10th	"Adios" by Everglow
Second Round	ACE		Kim Ri-won	570 votes	800 votes	Kim Seon-you	ACE	
Total Score	Grade 2			1098 votes	1338 votes	Grade 1		
Result: Grade 1 (Winner)

== Concept Battle (Episodes 5 and 6) ==
This mission was based on the results from the previous mission. The winning groups (Grade 1 and Grade 4) competed for first place while the losing groups (Grade 2 and Grade 3) competed for third place. The groups ranked first and third were exempt from elimination while the groups ranked second and fourth faced elimination. Since this was a collaboration mission, the remaining contestants were divided into teams and must choose one of the three concepts assigned to their groups. After each performance, the scores from each remaining contestant were added to the group's total score and the group ranked first would take the second spot in the forming group. The two contestants, one from each losing group, with the least online votes were eliminated from the show.

Color Key

Winning Team
Eliminated Contestant (Losing Team)
Excitement Part (Team)

=== Third Place Battle: Grade 3 vs Grade 2 ===
Grade 3 vs Grade 2
Concept	Song	Artists			
Concept	Song	Grade 3		Grade 2	
Pretty Girls (예쁜애)	"Dun Dun Dance" by Oh My Girl				
Pretty Girls (예쁜애)	"Dun Dun Dance" by Oh My Girl	Kim Su-hye	160	147	Kim Ri-won
Pretty Girls (예쁜애)	"Dun Dun Dance" by Oh My Girl	Park Hyo-lim	68	169	Won Ji-min
Pretty Girls (예쁜애)	"Dun Dun Dance" by Oh My Girl	Lee Ji-woo	105	88	Lee Ji-won
Good Girls (잘하는애)	"Run the World (Girls)" by Beyoncé				
Good Girls (잘하는애)	"Run the World (Girls)" by Beyoncé	Kim Yun-seo	152	147	Minami
Good Girls (잘하는애)	"Run the World (Girls)" by Beyoncé	Oh Ji-eun	146	99	Park Hyo-won
Good Girls (잘하는애)	"Run the World (Girls)" by Beyoncé	Lee Tae-rim	139	129	Choi Sa-rang
Talented Girls (끼많은애)	"Red Flavor" by Red Velvet				
Talented Girls (끼많은애)	"Red Flavor" by Red Velvet	Kim Hyun-hee	138	123	Lee Young-chae
Talented Girls (끼많은애)	"Red Flavor" by Red Velvet	Choi Yoon-jung	80	88	Karina Takei
Talented Girls (끼많은애)	"Red Flavor" by Red Velvet	Ryou Jay-hyun	121	122	Choi Su-i
Total Score			1109	1112	
Result: Grade 2 (Winner)

=== First Place Battle: Grade 1 vs Grade 4 ===
Grade 1 vs Grade 4
Concept	Song	Artists			
Concept	Song	Grade 1		Grade 4	
Pretty Girls (예쁜애)	"La Vie en Rose" by Iz*One				
Pretty Girls (예쁜애)	"La Vie en Rose" by Iz*One	Bohme Sara	116	82	Kim Yoo-yeon
Pretty Girls (예쁜애)	"La Vie en Rose" by Iz*One	Yoon Seung-joo	144	131	Myung Hyung-seo
Pretty Girls (예쁜애)	"La Vie en Rose" by Iz*One	Jung Yu-ju	81	141	Yoon Chae-won
Good Girls (잘하는애)	"Hello Bitches" by CL				
Good Girls (잘하는애)	"Hello Bitches" by CL	Kim Seon-you	144	163	Kim In-hye
Good Girls (잘하는애)	"Hello Bitches" by CL	Park Bo-eun	147	121	Song Ye-rim
Good Girls (잘하는애)	"Hello Bitches" by CL	Choi Soo-bin	134	148	Lee Mi-hee
Talented Girls (끼많은애)	"I'm Not Cool" by Hyuna				
Talented Girls (끼많은애)	"I'm Not Cool" by Hyuna	Kim Su-been	132	96	Kim Da-som
Talented Girls (끼많은애)	"I'm Not Cool" by Hyuna	Sung Min-chae	115	127	Kim Ha-ri
Talented Girls (끼많은애)	"I'm Not Cool" by Hyuna	Jung Si-woo	101	115	Hong Hye-ju
Talented Girls (끼많은애)	"I'm Not Cool" by Hyuna	Oh Yoo-jin	120	107	Lee Yu-min
Total Score			1234	1231	
Result: Grade 1 (Winner)

== Position Battle (Episodes 7 and 8) ==
Color Key

Winning Team
Eliminated Contestant

Position	Artists							
Position	Grades 1 and 2				Grades 3 and 4			
Position	Song	Name	Grade	Score	Score	Grade	Name	Song
Vocal	"Décalcomanie" by Mamamoo	Kim Ri-won	2	830	170	3	Kim Su-hye	"I" by Taeyeon
Vocal	"Décalcomanie" by Mamamoo	Lee Young-chae	2	830	170	3	Lee Ji-woo	"I" by Taeyeon
Vocal	"Décalcomanie" by Mamamoo	Won Ji-min	2	830	170	4	Myung Hyung-seo	"I" by Taeyeon
Vocal	"Décalcomanie" by Mamamoo	Park Bo-eun	1	830	170	4	Yoon Chae-won	"I" by Taeyeon
Dance	"Hot Sauce" by NCT Dream	Bohme Sara	1	190	810	3	Choi Yoon-jung	"Power" by Little Mix
Dance	"Hot Sauce" by NCT Dream	Choi Su-i	2	190	810	4	Hong Hye-ju	"Power" by Little Mix
Dance	"Hot Sauce" by NCT Dream	Jung Yu-ju	1	190	810	4	Kim Ha-ri	"Power" by Little Mix
Dance	"Hot Sauce" by NCT Dream	Karina Takei	2	190	810	4	Kim In-hye	"Power" by Little Mix
Dance	"Hot Sauce" by NCT Dream	Kim Seon-you	1	190	810	4	Kim Yoo-yeon	"Power" by Little Mix
Dance	"Hot Sauce" by NCT Dream	Kim Su-been	1	190	810	3	Lee Tae-rim	"Power" by Little Mix
Dance	"Hot Sauce" by NCT Dream	Lee Ji-won	2	190	810	3	Ryou Jay-hyun	"Power" by Little Mix
Dance	"Hot Sauce" by NCT Dream	Oh Yoo-jin	1	190	810	4	Song Ye-rim	"Power" by Little Mix
Dance	"Hot Sauce" by NCT Dream	Park Hyo-won	2	190	810	-		"Power" by Little Mix
Dance	"Hot Sauce" by NCT Dream	Yoon Seung-joo	1	190	810	-		"Power" by Little Mix
Rap	"Mic Drop" by BTS	Choi Soo-bin	1	380	620	3	Kim Hyun-hee	"Boss Bitch" by Doja Cat
Rap	"Mic Drop" by BTS	Jung Si-woo	1	380	620	3	Kim Yun-seo	"Boss Bitch" by Doja Cat
Rap	"Mic Drop" by BTS	Minami	2	380	620	4	Lee Yu-min	"Boss Bitch" by Doja Cat
Rap	"Mic Drop" by BTS	Sung Min-chae	1	380	620	3	Oh Ji-eun	"Boss Bitch" by Doja Cat
All-Rounder	"Money" by Lisa	Choi Sa-rang	2	600	400	4	Lee Mi-hee	"Next Level" by Aespa
Total Score	Grades 1 and 2			2000	2000	Grades 3 and 4		
Result	Tie							

== Representative Selection (Episodes 8 and 9) ==
Color Key

Debut Lineup Representative
Eliminated Contestant

Grade	Song	Contestant	Individual Rank
Grade 1	"Why Not?" by Loona	Kim Su-been	5
Grade 1	"Why Not?" by Loona	Bohme Sara	7
Grade 1	"Why Not?" by Loona	Yoon Seung-joo	1 (tie)
Grade 1	"Why Not?" by Loona	Oh Yoo-jin	8
Grade 1	"How You Like That" by Blackpink	Kim Seon-you	1 (tie)
Grade 1	"How You Like That" by Blackpink	Park Bo-eun	1 (tie)
Grade 1	"How You Like That" by Blackpink	Sung Min-chae	6
Grade 1	"How You Like That" by Blackpink	Choi Soo-bin	4
Grade 2	"Twinkle" by Girls' Generation-TTS	Minami	3
Grade 2	"Twinkle" by Girls' Generation-TTS	Lee Young-chae	5
Grade 2	"Twinkle" by Girls' Generation-TTS	Won Ji-min	1
Grade 2	"Butter" by BTS	Karina Takei	7
Grade 2	"Butter" by BTS	Lee Ji-won	8
Grade 2	"Butter" by BTS	Choi Sa-rang	6
Grade 2	"Butter" by BTS	Kim Ri-won	2
Grade 2	"Butter" by BTS	Cho Su-i	4
Grade 3	"Likey" by Twice	Kim Hyun-hee	1
Grade 3	"Likey" by Twice	Oh Ji-eun	3
Grade 3	"Likey" by Twice	Lee Tae-rim	6
Grade 3	"Hip" by Mamamoo	Choi Yoon-jung	2
Grade 3	"Hip" by Mamamoo	Kim Yun-seo	4
Grade 3	"Hip" by Mamamoo	Lee Ji-woo	5
Grade 4	"Time for the Moon Night" by GFriend	Kim Yoo-yeon	6
Grade 4	"Time for the Moon Night" by GFriend	Kim Ha-ri	7
Grade 4	"Time for the Moon Night" by GFriend	Lee Mi-hee	3 (tie)
Grade 4	"Time for the Moon Night" by GFriend	Myung Hyung-seo	1
Grade 4	"Uh-Oh" by (G)I-dle	Kim In-hye	3 (tie)
Grade 4	"Uh-Oh" by (G)I-dle	Song Ye-rim	8
Grade 4	"Uh-Oh" by (G)I-dle	Yoon Chae-won	2
Grade 4	"Uh-Oh" by (G)I-dle	Hong Hye-ju	5

== Representative Takeover (Episodes 10 and 11) ==
Color Key

Winning Team
New Debut Lineup Representative
Nominee for Elimination
Eliminated Contestant

Artists
Team A				Team B			
Song	Name	Grade	Score	Score	Grade	Name	Song
"Dun Dun" by Everglow	Kim Ha-ri	4	282 votes	356 votes	3	Choi Yoon-jung	"Mafia in the Morning" by Itzy
"Dun Dun" by Everglow	Kim In-hye	4	282 votes	356 votes	4	Hong Hye-ju	"Mafia in the Morning" by Itzy
"Dun Dun" by Everglow	Kim Su-been	1	282 votes	356 votes	3	Lee Tae-rim	"Mafia in the Morning" by Itzy
"Dun Dun" by Everglow	Lee Mi-hee	4	282 votes	356 votes	3	Lee Ji-woo	"Mafia in the Morning" by Itzy
"Dun Dun" by Everglow	Lee Young-chae	2	282 votes	356 votes	2	Minami	"Mafia in the Morning" by Itzy
"Dun Dun" by Everglow	Oh Ji-eun	3	282 votes	356 votes	4	Myung Hyung-seo	"Mafia in the Morning" by Itzy
"Dun Dun" by Everglow	Won Ji-min	2	282 votes	356 votes	1	Yoon Seung-joo	"Mafia in the Morning" by Itzy
Team A			Loser	Winner	Team B		

Artists
Debut Team			Song	Challenger		
Member	Grade	Score	Song	Score	Grade	Team B
Yoon Chae-won	4	210	"On the Ground" by Rosé	155	3	Lee Tae-rim
Kim Seon-you	1	186	"Lion" by (G)I-dle	193	3	Choi Yoon-jung
Kim Hyun-hee	3	180	"Havana" by Camila Cabello	201	2	Minami
Park Bo-eun	1	292	"Dumb Dumb" by Jeon Somi	89	1	Yoon Seung-joo
Kim Yun-seo	3	140	"Come Back Home" by 2NE1	241	4	Hong Hye-ju
Kim Ri-won	2	121	"Feel Special" by Twice	253	4	Myung Hyung-seo
Kim Yoo-yeon	4	196	"Leon" by IU	177	3	Lee Ji-woo

== Final Mission (Episode 12) ==
Color Key

Winning Team
Member of Classy
Eliminated Finalist

Artists
Debut Team				Challenger			
Songs	Name	Grade	Score	Score	Grade	Name	Songs
"Dreaming" + "Sonic Boom"	Yoon Chae-won	4	360	479	1	Kim Seon-you	"Sun" + "Lions"
"Dreaming" + "Sonic Boom"	Choi Yoon-jung	3	360	479	3	Kim Hyun-hee	"Sun" + "Lions"
"Dreaming" + "Sonic Boom"	Minami	2	360	479	3	Kim Yun-seo	"Sun" + "Lions"
"Dreaming" + "Sonic Boom"	Park Bo-eun	1	360	479	2	Kim Ri-won	"Sun" + "Lions"
"Dreaming" + "Sonic Boom"	Hong Hye-ju	4	360	479	2	Lee Young-chae	"Sun" + "Lions"
"Dreaming" + "Sonic Boom"	Myung Hyung-seo	4	360	479	4	Lee Mi-hee	"Sun" + "Lions"
"Dreaming" + "Sonic Boom"	Kim Yoo-yeon	4	360	479	2	Won Ji-min	"Sun" + "Lions"

== Notes ==
- Grade 4 member Myung Hyung-seo is a former member of Busters. She left the group in 2020 to focus on her studies.
- Grade 4 member Lee Mi-hee is a member of Botopass.
- Grade 4 member Bang Sun-hee is a member of Girlkind under her stage name, Ellyn.
- Grade 4 member Song Ye-rim is a former Dancing High contestant.
- Grade 1 members Kim Seon-you and Jung Si-woo are former Cap-Teen contestants.
- Grade 3 member Kim Ji-yeon is a former SG Entertainment trainee and former member of pre-debut groups Alpha Ray and SG Girls.
- Grade 1 member Choi Da-sol is a member of Little Cheer Girl.
