= Kim Yoo-yeon (singer) =

South Korean singer (born 2001)

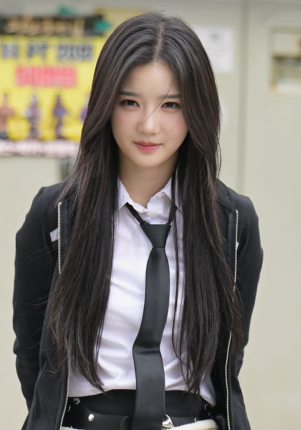
- Kim in May 2024
- Born: February 9, 2001 (age 25); Seoul, South Korea
- Education: Sehwa Girls' High School; Ewha Womans University
- Occupations: Singer; actress
- Musical career
- Genre: K-pop
- Instrument: Vocals
- Years active: 2022–present
- Label: Modhaus
- Member of: tripleS; Acid Angel from Asia; Acid Eyes; EVOLution; Visionary Vision; Hatchi

Korean name
- Hangul: 김유연
- Hanja: 金琉然
- RR: Gim Yuyeon
- MR: Kim Yuyŏn

Kim Yoo-yeon (Korean: 김유연; born February 9, 2001), known mononymously as Yooyeon, is a South Korean singer and actress. She is a member of the girl group TripleS and its sub-units Acid Angel from Asia, Acid Eyes, EVOLution, Visionary Vision, Hatchi and Sun. She first garnered attention through her participation in the survival competition show My Teenage Girl.

== Early life ==
Kim Yoo-yeon was born on February 9, 2001, in Banpo-dong, Seocho District, Seoul, South Korea. When she was young, she studied abroad in New Zealand and the United States to learn English. She attended Sehwa Girls' High School and attends Ewha Womans University majoring in Science Education as of 2024, but is on a leave of absence to pursue her dream of being a celebrity. She took the college entrance exam three times and passed the exam every time. She previously was a student of Dongguk University in the department of Engineering but dropped out after the urging from her parents. As she was growing up, her parents wanted her to pursue a career in the medical field due to her mother being a pharmacist and her father being a doctor. However, when attending university she wasn't sure if she was happy pursuing the university major that she chose and wanted to be a celebrity instead. Initially, her parents were against her being a celebrity and expressed their disappointment in the idea.

== Career ==
=== 2021–2022: My Teenage Girl ===
On September 8, 2021, Kim appeared in a trailer for My Teenage Girl, confirming her participation. At the beginning of the show, she was eliminated due to not having enough points to advance to the next round. However, one of the show's mentors Jeon So-yeon revived her back into the show. Jeon stated, "when searching the term My Teenage Girl online, Kim shows up first on the searches. This shows that she is someone who can catch the eyes as a celebrity, and it is a charm that can be helpful to an idol group." Kim consistently ranked within the top three as the show progressed, and unfortunately finished in eighth place in the final episode due to lack of benefit points, therefore being unable to debut in the final group.

=== 2022–present: Debut with tripleS ===
On July 11, 2022, Kim was announced to be a member of TripleS as the fifth member. Kim stated that her 'heart had hurt' after seeing her fans continuously wait for her to make her debut, so she gave the idol life a second chance as she found herself to be the happiest when she is on stage. Kim was personally offered to join TripleS by Jaden Jeong, the CEO of Modhaus, as he watched My Teenage Girl. She is typically known as an idol who had zero days of idol training. On September 16, 2022, TripleS announced they would be debuting their first two sub-units, with the members of the sub-units being voted by fans. Kim was announced to be a member and the leader of the sub-unit Acid Angel from Asia on September 25, 2022, and the sub-unit officially debuted on October 27, 2022, with the debut extended play (EP) Access and "Generation" serving as the lead track. Kim officially debuted in TripleS as 10 members on February 13, 2023, with the extended play Assemble. On April 20, TripleS announced that they would be debuting their next sub-units. On June 2, Kim became a member of the collaborative sub-unit, Acid Eyes, a collaboration of the two TripleS sub-units, Acid Angel from Asia and Krystal Eyes. Kim was then announced as the first member and the leader of the sub-unit EVOLution on April 22 the same year. The sub-unit debuted on October 11, 2023. In 2023, TripleS won several Rookie of the Year awards including MAMA Awards and Hanteo Music Awards. Kim made her acting debut on April 7, 2024, as the leading role in the web series What's Up?. On June 18, Kim was announced to be placed into the sub-unit Visionary Vision.

== Endorsements ==
In September 2022, Kim appeared as an actress in a GS25 commercial alongside fellow TripleS member Kim Chae-yeon. In May 2023, she became the brand promoter for 'CODINGON X SeSAC'. She appeared as an actress in various commercials for CODINGON in 2023. In June 2023, Kim became a product packaging model for the Korean brand GRN+, for their product line 'Triple Festa'.

== Public image and influence ==
=== In the media ===
Since her participation in My Teenage Girl, Kim is often described as the "Goddess of Ewha Womans University", "Goddess of My Teenage Girl", "Eternal Goddess", "Visual Center", and "The Next Generation Ending Fairy". She was named one of the top five visual contestants of My Teenage Girl, along with fellow TripleS member Lee Ji-woo, as well as Classy members Myung Hyung-seo and Kim Ri-won, and Rescene's Minami. She is often said to resemble DIA's Jung Chae-yeon and is said to share similar visuals, such as immaculate skin, delicate features, and an innocent image; netizens believed that their features look so much alike that they could be sisters. Due to her ending fairy on My Teenage Girl, viewers said it gave a similar feel to Jung Chae-yeon's ending fairy during Produce 101. At the time, she was also continuously ranked high in the most searched hot topic among non-drama television show topics.

Since her debut in TripleS, Kim has been named as a "true growth character" as her singing and dancing skills were different and improved from before. In June 2024, Kim entered the Girl group individual brand reputation results for the first time, resulting in 51st place.

=== Influence ===
Shortly after her reveal as a TripleS member, she gained attention online for her confident response to netizens concerns about her decision of taking absence from a prestigious university to become a K-pop idol. When asked "isn't it a waste?", she confidently responded that she doesn't have any regrets, even if she dropped out she is confident enough that she can pass the CSAT again. She gained praise from netizens for her optimistic response.

Park So-hyun, a member of TripleS and the producer of its sub-unit +(KR)ystal Eyes debut b-side track "Deja-vu" stated the lyric "니 꿈 속 안을 유영해" was written because she was thinking of Yoo-yeon. (Note: The Korean word 유영해 (Yooyeong-hae; to swim) and 유연 (Yoo-yeon) sound similar in Korean)

On June 28, 2024, Kim was chosen by Forbes Korea's Idol Pick for "Which model student celebrity would have been the student council president?". Due to this, she had a special article written in Forbes Korea July 2024 issue and was stated to be a role model to teenage fans.

== Discography ==
=== Singles ===
Title	Year	Album
"Access" (Sung by Kim Yoo-yeon and Kim Na-kyoung)	2022	Access

=== Collaboration Singles ===
Title	Year	Peak chart positions	Album
Title	Year	KOR Gaon	Album
"Happiness Over Luck" (Sung by Kim Yoo-yeon, Lee Ji-woo, Mimiminu)	2025	—	Non-album single

=== Soundtrack appearances ===
List of soundtrack appearances, showing year released, chart positions, and album name
Title	Year	Album
"Dreaming" (Sung by Kim Yoo-yeon, Seo Da-hyun, Gong Yu-bin, Park Shi-on)	2024	Dreaming <Shooting Stars X tripleS>

=== Participation singles ===
Title	Year	Album	Ref.
"Dreaming" (With My Teenage Girl contestants)	2022	My Teenage Girl Final	
"Sonic Boom" (With My Teenage Girl contestants)	2022	My Teenage Girl Final	

=== Songwriting credits ===
List of songs, showing year released, artist name, and name of the album
Title	Year	Artist	Album	Notes
"Happiness Over Luck"	2025	Lee Ji-woo, Kim Yoo-yeon, Mimiminu	Non-Album Single	As lyricist

== Filmography ==
=== Web series ===
Year	Title	Role	Ref.
2024	What's Up	Lee Yu-jin	

=== Web shows ===
Year	Title	Role	Notes	Ref.
2024	Hwipoja	Cast member	Season 2	
2025	Lady and Gentlemen	Cast member		
2025	What Should I Do?	Cast member		

=== Television shows ===
Year	Title	Role	Notes	Ref.
2021	Hesistation Before Going to School	Trainee	Pre-equal show to My Teenage Girl	
2021	My Teenage Girl	Contestant	Finished 8th	

=== Radio ===
Year	Title	Role	Notes	Ref.
2024	Idol Radio	Special DJ	October 28	
