= Acid Angel from Asia =

South Korean girl group

- Origin: Seoul, South Korea
- Genres: K-pop
- Years active: 2022
- Labels: Modhaus
- Spinoff of: TripleS
- Members: Kim Yoo-yeon; Kim Na-kyoung; Gong Yu-bin; Jeong Hye-rin
- Website: Official website

Acid Angel from Asia (Korean: 애시드 엔젤 프롬 에이시아; abbreviated as AAA) is the first sub-unit of South Korean girl group TripleS, formed by Modhaus in 2022. It is composed of members Kim Yoo-yeon, Kim Na-kyoung, Gong Yu-bin, and Jeong Hye-rin. The quartet made their recording debut on October 28, 2022, with the extended play Access.

== History ==
=== 2022: Formation and debut with Access ===
On February 18, 2022, Modhaus announced that they would be launching the world's first "fan-participating girl group" named TripleS and that the group was set to be introduced in the first half of the year. The group is led by the CEO Jaden Jeong who helped to produce artists such as Loona and OnlyOneOf and worked with companies such as JYP Entertainment, Woollim Entertainment, Sony Music Korea, and Blockberry Creative.

Prior to joining TripleS, all members of AAA were previously involved in the entertainment industry. Jeong Hye-rin was previously a child actress under Kids Planet and made her acting debut in the 2018 web-series Between Us. She has also appeared in a commercial for Japanese textbooks. Kim Na-kyoung is the younger sister of Bibi and appeared in the final episode of SBS' competition show The Fan. Jeong Hye-rin and Kim Na-kyoung are former P Nation trainees. Kim Yoo-yeon was a former contestant on the MBC survival show My Teenage Girl, where she was eliminated during the final episode placing 8th. Gong Yu-bin was a contestant on the TV Chosun junior cooking show I am Chef where she made it to the final Top 3.

Acid Angel from Asia were initially revealed every fortnight between May 2022 until September 2022 as Jeong Hye-rin, Kim Yoo-yeon, Kim Na-kyoung, and Gong Yu-bin alongside other 4 members. (Note: Full lineup revealed in order as Yoon Seo-yeon, Jeong Hye-rin, Lee Ji-woo, Kim Chae-yeon, Kim Yoo-yeon, Kim Soo-min, Kim Na-kyoung, and Gong Yu-bin.) On September 16, it was announced that TripleS will start preparing for sub-unit debut activities with each unit having 4 members, which lineup was voted by fans. The two sub-units were named Acid Angel From Asia and +(KR)ystal Eyes, with Acid Angel From Asia having their debut activities first in October. On October 28, Acid Angel From Asia made an official debut with their first extended play Access, alongside its lead single "Generation".

However, in an interview with NME, MODHAUS's CEO Jaden Jeong clarified that the unit did not disband but won't be releasing any new albums, explaining that "disbanding" does not have the same meaning in the TripleS system, and that fans will be able to see the unit again in the future. He also stated that video content was still being released to boost sales.

=== 2023–present: Formation of Acid Eyes ===
On June 1, 2023, it was announced that Acid Angel from Asia and +(KR)ystal Eyes would release an album titled Cherry Gene together as a combined sub-unit called Acid Eyes. The lead single and its accompanying visualizer were released on June 6, 2023, while the physical album was released in July 2023.

== Members ==
- Jeong Hye-rin (정혜린)
- Kim Yoo-yeon (김유연) – leader
- Kim Na-kyoung (김나경)
- Gong Yu-bin (공유빈)

== Discography ==
Extended plays

- Access (2022)

== Videography ==
=== Music videos ===
Title	Year	Director(s)	Ref.
"Generation"	2022	Oh Ji-won (Undermood Film)	
