= Access (EP) =

- Digital cover

EP by Acid Angel from Asia
- Released: October 28, 2022
- Genre: K-pop
- Length: 13:42
- Language: Korean; English
- Label: Modhaus; Kakao

TripleS chronology
Access (2022)	Assemble (2023)

Singles from Access
- 1. "Generation" Released: October 28, 2022

Access is the first extended play by South Korean girl group Acid Angel from Asia, a sub-unit of TripleS consisting of members Jeong Hye-rin, Kim Yoo-yeon, Kim Na-kyoung, and Gong Yu-bin. It was released on October 28, 2022, by Modhaus and distributed by Kakao Entertainment. The album contains five tracks, including the title track "Generation".

== Promotion and release ==
On September 16, it was announced that tripleS would begin preparing for sub-unit debut activities with each unit having 4 members, which lineup was voted by fans. The two sub-units were named Acid Angel From Asia and +(KR)ystal Eyes, with Acid Angel From Asia having their debut activities first in October. On October 28, 2022, Acid Angel From Asia made an official debut with their first extended play Access, alongside its lead single "Generation".

== Track listing ==
Access track listing
No.	Title	Lyrics	Music	Arrangement	Length
1.	"Access" (sung by Kim Yoo-yeon and Kim Na-kyoung)	Kim Sung-woo	EL CAPITXN; Vendors (Nano)	EL CAPITXN; Vendors (Nano)	0:45
2.	"Generation"	Jaden Jeong; EL CAPITXN; Vendors (Nano); Kim Sung-woo	EL CAPITXN; Vendors (Nano); Maria Marcus; Louise Frick Sveen	EL CAPITXN; Vendors (Nano)	2:44
3.	"Rolex"	Jaden Jeong; G-High (MonoTree)	BADD; Stella Jones (153/Joombas); G-High (MonoTree); Kwon Ae-jin (MonoTree)	BADD	3:12
4.	"Charla" (Korean: 찰나; RR: Chalna; lit. For a Moment)	Choi Young-kyung; Jaden Jeong	Choi Young-kyung; Gionata Caracciolo; Alex Marton	Alex Marton; Gionata Caracciolo	3:03
5.	"Dimension" (AAA Version)	Lee Lee-jin; Jaden Jeong; Choi Young-kyung	BADD; San Yoon; Isa Guerra	BADD	3:11
6.	"+(82)"		Yoon Jong Sung; pdly (MonoTree)		0:47
Total length:					13:42

== Charts ==
=== Weekly charts ===
Weekly chart performance for Access
Chart (2022)	Peak position
South Korean Albums (Circle)	9

=== Monthly charts ===
Monthly chart performance for Access
Chart (2022)	Peak position
South Korean Albums (Circle)	32

== Release history ==
Release history and formats for Access
Region	Date	Format	Label
Various	October 28, 2022	Digital download; streaming	Modhaus
South Korea	October 28, 2022	Digital download; streaming	Modhaus
South Korea	November 9, 2022	CD	Modhaus; Kakao
