= Cho Yoon-sun =

South Korean politician (born 1965)

- 조윤선
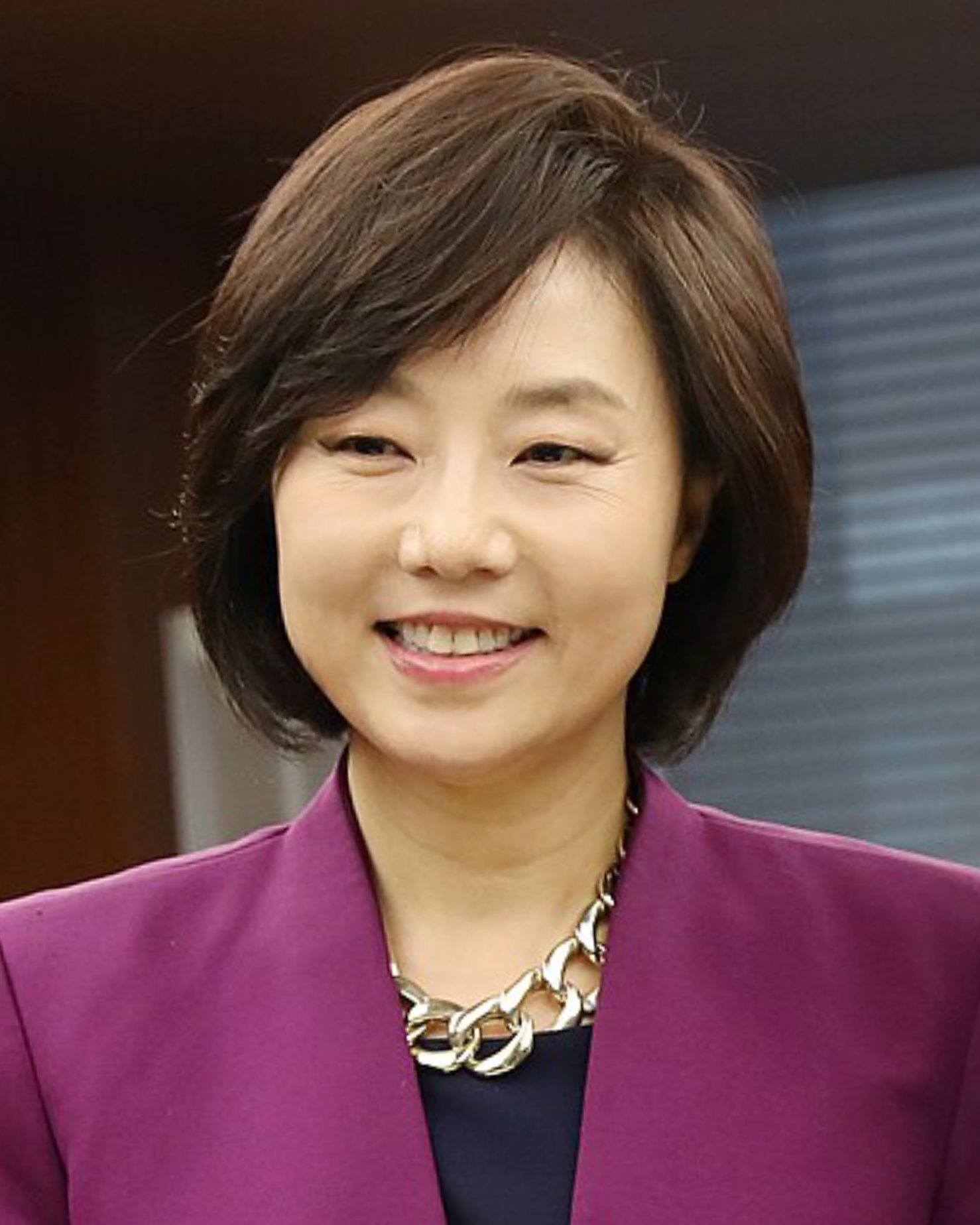
- Cho in 2016

Minister of Culture, Sports and Tourism
- In office 5 September 2016 – 21 January 2017
- Prime Minister: Hwang Kyo-ahn
- Preceded by: Kim Jong-deok
- Succeeded by: Song Soo-geun (Acting)

Minister of Gender Equality and Family
- In office 26 February 2013 – 13 June 2014
- Prime Minister: Chung Hong-won
- Preceded by: Kim Geum-rae
- Succeeded by: Kim Hee-jeong

Senior Secretary for Political Affairs
- In office 12 June 2014 – 18 May 2015
- President: Park Geun-hye
- Preceded by: Park Jun-woo
- Succeeded by: Hyun Gi-hwan

Member of the National Assembly
- In office 30 May 2008 – 29 May 2010
- Constituency: Proportional representation

Personal details
- Born: 22 July 1965 (age 61) Seoul, South Korea
- Party: Saenuri Party
- Education: Seoul National University; Columbia University

Korean name
- Hangul: 조윤선
- Hanja: 趙允旋
- RR: Jo Yunseon
- MR: Cho Yunsŏn

Cho Yoon-sun (born 22 July 1965) is a South Korean lawyer, writer and politician. She formerly served as the South Korean Minister of Gender Equality and Family and later as its Minister of Culture. However, she was later jailed after being convicted of abuse of power and coercion.

== Life and career ==
Cho Yoon-sun was born on 22 July 1965 in Seoul. She attended Sehwa Girls' High School, graduating in 1984, and then Seoul National University where she received her bachelor's degree in International Relations in 1988. She later went to Columbia Law School where she received her Master of Laws degree in 2001.

She passed the Korean bar in 1991, and joined the Kim and Chang Law Firm where she became a partner. During the 2002 South Korean presidential election she worked as a spokesperson for Lee Choi-chang of the Grand National Party. She left Kim & Chang in 2006 to work for Citibank Korea where she became General Counsel and a managing director. She left Citibank Korea in 2008 when she was elected to the 18th South Korean National Assembly.

In 2010, together with General Baek Sun-yeop, Cho helped establish the Korean War Memorial Foundation which supplies scholarships to the descendants of veterans of the Korean War. Cho served as vice-chairperson of the foundation from July 2010 to March 2013. Beginning in July 2010, she acted as a goodwill ambassador for the Korea International Cooperation Agency (KOICA).

In 2013, she was appointed as South Korea's Minister of Gender Equality and Family. In 2014, Cho left the ministry to become President Park Geun-hye's Senior Secretary for Political Affairs. However, she resigned that post in 2015 after failing to meet the president's goals for public employee pension reform. Cho then taught for a year at Sungshin Women's University's College of Law.

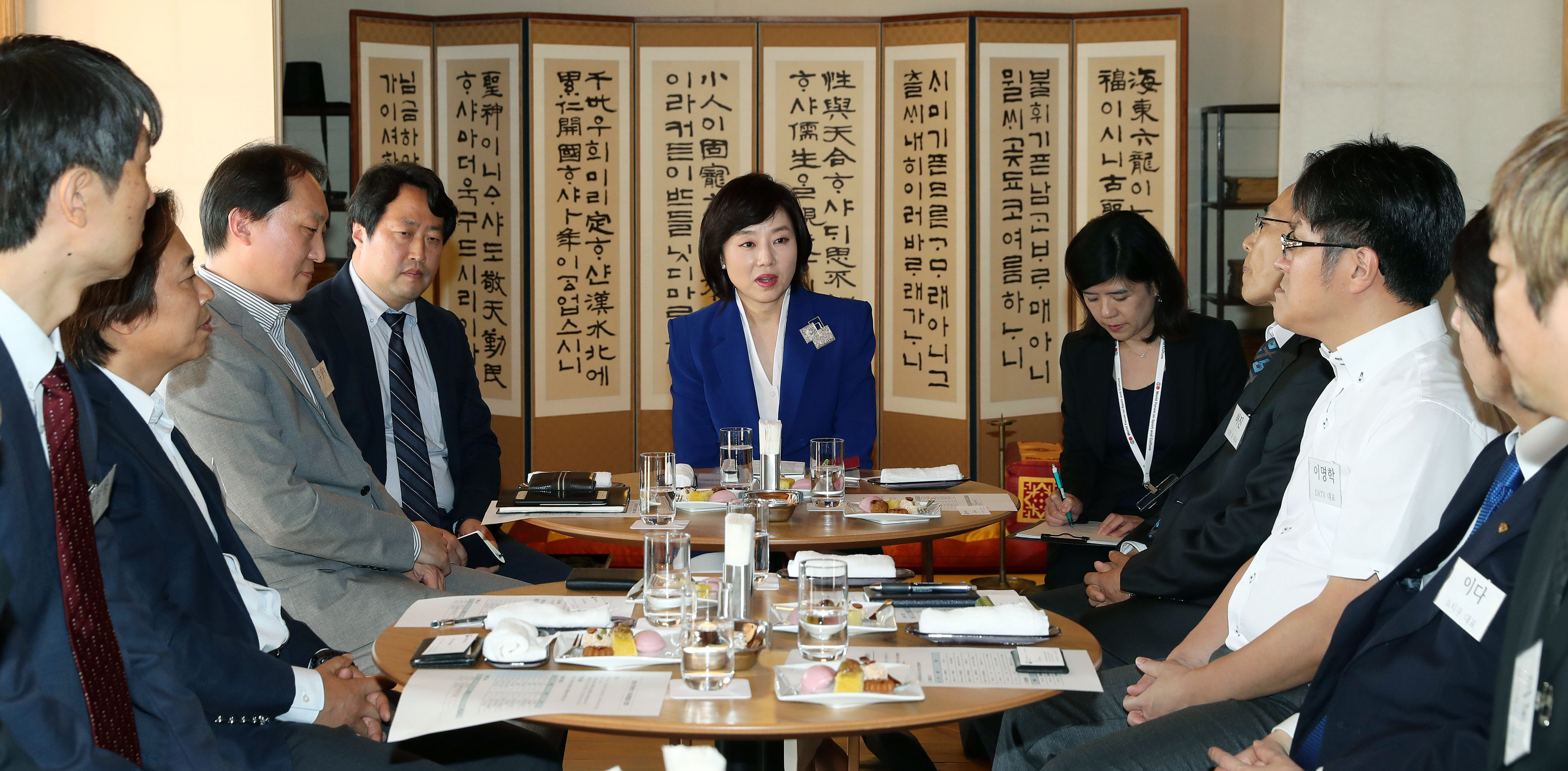
Cho in 2016

In August 2016, President Park appointed Cho as the new Minister of Culture, Sports and Tourism. She resigned the post in January 2017.

=== Controversies ===
In both her confirmation hearings for Minister of Gender Equality and Family in 2013 and for Minister of Culture in 2016, Cho was taken to task for her conspicuous consumption. In 2016 her profits from real estate speculation were also an issue.

In December 2016, as part of the continued investigation of corruption under President Park Geun-hye, the existence of a political blacklist of artists came to light. Cho was charged with helping to create the list, although she denied it. In January 2017, Cho was arrested on corruption and perjury charges, and she subsequently resigned as Minister of Culture. In February formal indictments were issued charging her with abuse of power, coercion and perjury. She is being represented by nine lawyers, including her attorney husband Park Seong-yeop (박성엽).

On 27 July 2017, Cho was convicted of perjury for lying about the blacklist to the National Assembly. The Seoul Central District Court suspended her prison term and released her from jail the same day.

On 23 January 2018, Cho was convicted of her role in drawing up plans to blacklist over 10,000 South Korean artists critical of President Park. She was arrested in the courtroom and was sentenced to two more years of prison in addition to the six months she served on the minor perjury charge from January to July 2017.

In August 2018, in a separate corruption case involving funds from the National Intelligence Service, prosecutors asked the court to sentence Cho to serve six years in prison and to pay a fine of 100 million won ($90,000).

== Writing career ==
Cho has written about culture in South Korea. She has published two books, and regularly writes for magazine publication. Among her works are the books Meeting Opera at an Arts Gallery, which was chosen by the Ministry of Culture as the Cultural Book of the Year for 2008, and Culture is the Answer (2011).
