= Sehwa Girls' High School =

Private all-girls school in Seoul, South Korea

Sehwa Girls' High School 세화여자고등학교

Location
- 56-7 Sinbanpo-ro, Seocho-gu; Seoul; South Korea; 37°30′7.8552″N 126°59′35.79″E

Information
- Type: Private
- Established: 1978
- Principal: Kim Gi-hyuk (김기혁)
- Deputy Principal: Kim Gi-hyuk (김기혁)
- Faculty: 78 (as of January 2021)
- Gender: Girls
- Enrolment: 1,024 (as of January 2021)
- Campus size: 43,012m^{3}
- Website: www.sehwa-gs.hs.kr

Korean name
- Hangul: 세화여자고등학교
- Hanja: 世和女子高等學校
- RR: Sehwa yeoja godeunghakgyo
- MR: Sehwa yŏja kodŭnghakkyo

Sehwa Girls' High School (Korean: 세화여자고등학교) is a private girls high school located in Seocho-gu, Seoul, South Korea.

== History ==
Sehwa Girls' High School was established on March 1, 1978. The current principal Won Yoo-shin was appointed on March 1, 2014 as the school's 11th principal.

== Principals ==
List of principals of Sehwa Girls' High School

- 1st: Song Hak-joon (1978.03.01—1980.10.25)
- 2nd: Moon Young-gak (1980.10.25—1984.03.01)
- 3rd: Hong Seong-joon (1984.03.01—1985.03.01)
- 4th: Moon Young-gak (1985.03.01—1989.03.01)
- 5th: Baek Soo-dong (1989.03.01—1993.03.01)
- 6th: Jeong Jin-ui (1993.03.01—1997.03.01)
- 7th: Oh Gi-soon (1997.03.01—2004.09.01)
- 8th: Chae Nam-joo (2004.09.01—2008.03.01)
- 9th: Park Jeong-shin (2008.03.01—2012.03.01)
- 10th: Jeon Seon-gil (2012.03.01—2014.03.01)
- 11th: Won Yoo-shin (2014.03.01—2020.03.01)
- 12th: Kim Gi-hyuk (2020.03.01—Present)

== Notable alumni ==
=== Entertainment ===
- Kang Min-kyung - Singer and member of Davichi
- Gummy - Singer
- Kim Wan-sun - Singer
- Lee Hyun-ji - Singer
- Euaerin - Singer and member of Nine Muses
- Jin Se-yeon - Actress
- Lee Mi-yeon - Actress
- Park Ro-sa - Actress
- Yoo Na-mi - Actress
- Choi Moon-gyeong - Movie actress
- Sohn Mina - Announcer and writer
- Kim Yoo-yeon - Singer and member of tripleS

=== Sports ===
- Cho Ha-ri - Short track speed skater
- Chella Choi - Professional golfer
- Choi Eun-kyung - Short track speed skater
- Choi Min-kyung - Short track speed skater
- Choi Ji-eun - Figure skater
- Hwang Min-kyoung - Volleyball player
- Joo Min-jin - Short track speed skater
- Ko Gi-hyun - Short track speed skater
- Lee Hae-in - Figure skater
- Lee Young-joo - Volleyball player
- Shim Suk-hee - Short track speed skater
- Son Soo-min - Short track speed skater

=== Politician ===
- Cho Yoon-sun
