= Generation (Acid Angel from Asia song) =

Single by Acid Angel from Asia

from the album Access
- Released: October 28, 2022
- Recorded: 2022
- Length: 2:44
- Label: Modhaus; Kakao
- Songwriters: Jaden Jeong; El Capitxn; Vendors (Nano); Kim Sung-woo
- Producers: El Capitxn; Vendors (Nano); Maria Marcus; Louise Frick Sveen

Music video
- "Generation" on YouTube

"Generation" is the debut single by South Korean girl group Acid Angel from Asia, the first sub-unit of TripleS for their debut extended play (EP) Access. It was released on October 22, 2022, through Modhaus. Musically, "Generation" was described as a future bass genre based on hip-hop grooves, with heavy bass sounds and dreamy vocals and rap.

== Background and release ==
On September 16, it was announced that TripleS will start preparing for sub-unit debut activities with each unit having 4 members. The two sub-units were named Acid Angel From Asia and +(KR)ystal Eyes, with Acid Angel From Asia having their debut activities first in October. The lineup was voted by fans and Acid Angel From Asia made their official debut with the first extended play Access on October 28, 2022.

== Composition ==
"Generation" was written and composed by Jaden Jeong alongside El Capitxn with Vendors, and Maria Marucs participating in the composition and arrangement. It was described as a dance song with "up-tempo house beat characterized by rock guitar", with lyrics about "achieving anything even if there are difficulties if we are not afraid of challenging ourselves with healthy and bold energy". "Generation" was composed in the key of E minor, with a tempo of 120 beats per minute.

== Commercial performance ==
"Generation" debuted at number 98 on South Korea's Gaon Download Chart in the chart issue dated June 19–25, 2022.

In New Zealand, the song debuted at number ninety-eight on the RMNZ Hot Singles in the chart issue dated November 7, 2022, and peaked at number thirty-four.

== Credits and personnel ==
Credits adapted from Melon.

- Acid Angel from Asia – vocals
- Adora - background vocals
- Jaden Jeong – lyrics
- Kim Sung-woo – lyrics
- El Capitxn – lyrics, composition, arrangement
- Vendors (Nano) – composition, arrangement
- Maria Marcus – composition
- Louise Frick Sveen – composition
- Minjeong Woo – digital editing, recording engineer (at doobdoob studio)
- Taeseob Lee – mixing (at gateway studio)
- Namwoo Kwon — mastering (at 821 Sound Mastering)

== Charts ==
Chart performance for "Generation"
| Chart (2022) | Peak position |
|---|---|
| New Zealand Hot Singles (RMNZ) | 34 |
| South Korea (Circle) | 194 |

== Release history ==
Release history and formats for "Generation"
| Region | Date | Format | Label |
|---|---|---|---|
| South Korea | October 28, 2022 | Digital download; streaming; promotional CD | MODHAUS; Kakao |
| Various | October 28, 2022 | Digital download; streaming; promotional CD | MODHAUS; Kakao |
