= Mimiirose =

South Korean girl group

Background information
- Also known as: Mimiimii
- Origin: Seoul, South Korea
- Genre: K-pop
- Years active: 2022–2026
- Label: Pocket7
- Past members: Hyori; Yeonjae; Yewon; Yunju; Anna; Yerin; Jia
- Website: mimiirose-official.com

Mimiirose (Korean: 미미로즈; RR: Mimirojeu; stylized in all lowercase) was a South Korean girl group under Pocket7 Entertainment. The group was composed of seven members: Hyori, Yeonjae, Yewon, Jia, Yunju, Anna, and Yerin. They officially made their debut on September 16, 2022, with their debut single album Awesome with the lead single, "Rose". The group disbanded on April 16, 2026.

== Name ==
The group's name, 'mimiirose' is a compound word of mimiimii, meaning beauty and rose. mimiirose means blooming like a gorgeous rose by comparing the petals surrounded by layers to inner and outer beauty.

== History ==
=== Pre-debut activities ===
Some members have previously been involved in the entertainment industry prior to joining the group. Jia was a contestant on the reality survival show Girls Planet 999, and was eliminated in episode 8, ranking K11, therefore being unable to debut in final debut lineup. Yunju was a former A Team Entertainment trainee and was originally a member of BugAboo, but she left the group before the group officially debuted. After her departure of the group, she became a contestant on My Teenage Girl but was eliminated in Episode 3.

=== 2022–2023: Introduction and debut with Awesome and Live ===
On July 10, 2022, Jia announced through her personal Instagram that she would make her debut as a member of Yes Im's upcoming girl group Mimiirose. Mimiirose is the first group to debut under the company, which was formed by Im Chang-jung.

The group made their first public appearance in July 2022 at Im's concert, the CEO of Yes Im Entertainment. On August 24, 2022, Im shared that the group were scheduled to debut 2-3 years prior, but was postponed indefinitely due to the COVID-19 pandemic.

The group officially debuted on September 16, 2022, with their debut single album Awesome with the lead single "Rose". On the same day, they held their debut showcase which was broadcast on SBS M.

The group made their first comeback on September 14, 2023, with their 2nd single album Live with the lead single "Flirting".

On November 21, 2023, it was announced that the group would be leaving Yes Im Entertainment to sign with a new agency.

=== 2024–2026: Reformation as a 7-member line-up, Reebon, and disbandment ===
On March 26, 2024, it was announced that the group would sign under Pocket7 Entertainment and 2 new members would be added to the group lineup. On August 1, it was revealed that the new members were Anna and Yerin.

The group released their 3rd single album Reebon with the single “The Flowers Swayed” on August 16, 2024, becoming their first release with new members Anna and Yerin.

On April 15, 2026, Jia announced that she would be leaving the group. The following day, Yeonjae, Yunju, & Yewon announced their departures with Yewon announcing the disbandment of the group.

== Members ==
=== Former ===
- Hyori (효리)
- Yeonjae (연재) – leader
- Yewon (예원)
- Yunju (윤주)
- Anna (안나)
- Yerin (예린)
- Jia (지아)

== Discography ==
=== Single albums ===
List of single albums, showing selected details, selected chart positions and sales figures
Title	Details	Peak chart positions	Sales
Title	Details	KOR	Sales
Awesome	Released: September 16, 2022; Label: Yes Im Entertainment; Formats: CD, digital download, streaming; Track listing: 1. "Lululu"; 2. "Rose"; 3. "Kill Me More"; 4. "Rose" (instrumental)	16	KOR: 9,807
Live	Released: September 14, 2023; Label: Yes Im Entertainment; Formats: CD, digital download, streaming; Track listing: 1. "Flirting"; 2. "Tipsy"; 3. "A-Ok"; 4. "Flirting" (instrumental)	63	KOR: 4,209
Reebon	Released: August 16, 2024; Label: Pocket7 Entertainment; Formats: CD, digital download, streaming; Track listing: 1. "The Flowers Swayed"; 2. "Ribbon"; 3. "Doki"	73	KOR: 2,594
"—" denotes a recording that did not chart or was not released in that territory-->

=== Singles ===
List of singles, showing year released, chart positions, and album name
Title	Year	Peak chart positions	Album
Title	Year	KOR Down.	Album
"Rose" (로즈)	2022	104	Awesome
"Flirting"	2023	168	Live
"The Flowers Swayed"	2024	—	Reebon

== Videography ==
=== Music videos ===
Title	Year	Director	Ref.
"Rose"	2022	Vegetarian Pitbull	
"Flirting"	2023		
"The Flowers Swayed"	2024		
