= Girlkind =

South Korean girl group

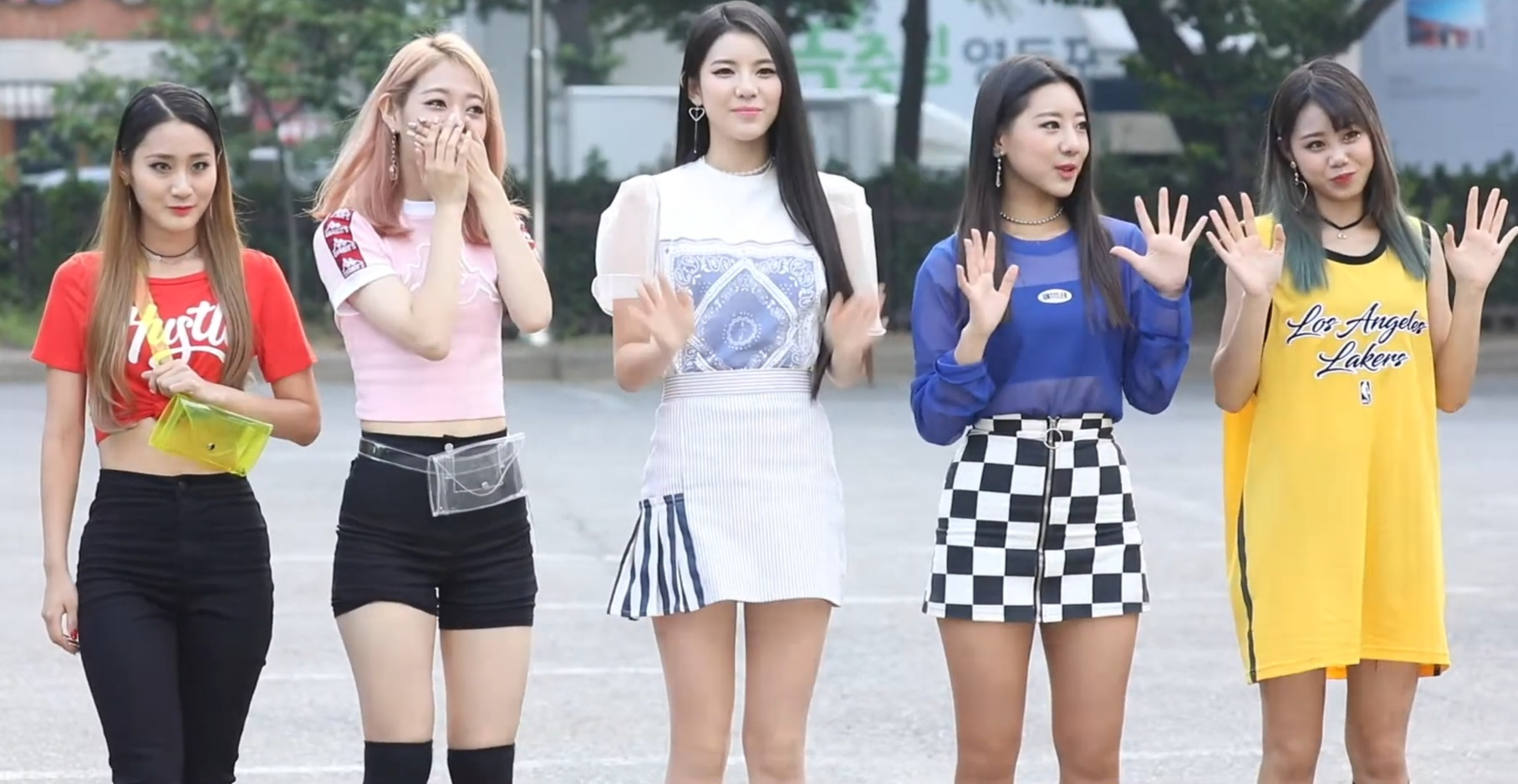
- Girlkind in June 2018

Background information
- Origin: Seoul, South Korea
- Genres: K-pop
- Years active: 2018–2022
- Label: Nextlevel Entertainment
- Past members: Sun J; Xeheun; Jikang; Medic Jin; Ellyn

Girlkind (Korean: 걸카인드, stylized in all caps) was a four-member girl group under Nextlevel Entertainment that debuted as five with members Sun J, Xeheun, Jikang, Medic Jin, and Ellyn on January 17, 2018, releasing their first digital single "FANCI". Sun J left the group in 2020. They disbanded on August 13, 2022.

== History ==
=== 2017-2018: Formation and debut ===
Xeheun competed as a Nextlevel Entertainment trainee in the South Korean reality television show Produce 101 but was eliminated in Episode 5.

Later Xeheun was announced as the first member of Girlkind in 2017.

Girlkind members were slowly introduced through dance covers of popular Korean boy groups like BTS, Got7, Seventeen and Wanna One released on their YouTube channel. Later on January 17, 2018, Girlkind debuted as a five-member Hip-Hop girl group with their first digital single "FANCI" on Show Champion.

=== 2018: Broccoli (Mixtape), Girlkind overseas, S.O.R.R.Y ===
On April 7, 2018, Girlkind released their first mixtape "Broccoli".

Girlkind also performed at the "2018 Changwon K-POP World Festival" in Bahrain being the first K-pop girl group to ever perform in that country.

At the end of May, Girlkind confirmed to come back with a new digital single "S.O.R.R.Y" through their social media. Later, a performance video for Bolbbalgan4 song "Travel" was released on June 5, 2018.

On June 7, 2018, Girlkind released "S.O.R.R.Y" teasers for the music video. Compared to their previous Hip-Hop releases, Girlkind seemed to have switched to a brighter and summery concept filming the music video in Saipan.

=== 2019: GIRLKIND XJR ===
On August 19, 2018, Nextlevel Entertainment announced on social media Girlkind sub-unit which consisted of Girlkind Leader Xeheun and Main Rapper Jikang. Girlkind XJR first Mini Album "Life is Diamond" was released on August 28, 2018. Xeheun and Jikang both participated into the composition of the title track "Money Talk" which they later performed and promoted at the Korean music show KBS Music Bank.

=== 2020: Sun J Temporary Hiatus, Future (퓨쳐), Psycho4U ===
On March 22, 2020, Nextlevel Entertainment announced Sun J temporary hiatus from Girlkind activities to concentrate on her studies at Gimpo University after her graduation from the School of Performing Arts Seoul.

Later at the end of March, Girlkind had already been re-organized as a four-member group ready to come back with another digital single "Future (퓨쳐) ".The song and music video were released on April 14, 2020, on all streaming services. The members Xeheun, Jikang and Medic Jin participated into the writing of the lyrics. On April 17 a challenge called "Future Challenge" was consequently announced through social media with the aim to overcome COVID-19 by encouraging people into supporting each other in order to achieve our dreams.

On October 26, 2020, Girlkind announced to come back with another single "Psycho4U", which was officially released on November 4, 2020.

=== 2021: Good Vibes Only (이 분위기에 취해), My Teenage Girl ===
Girlkind announced their come back plan through social media followed by their Yellow and Pink concept teasers.

Nextlevel Entertainment revealed through articles Brave Entertainment producer Two Champ participated in producing the new song while members Xeheun and Jikang helped arranging the choreography.

The song and music video were released on July 7, 2021 entering Melon and Bugs! Top 100 latest 24 Hours chart from position #99 peaking at #39.

The youngest member Ellyn participated into prequel season 등교 전 망설임 (RR: Deunggyo jeon mangseorim; lit. 'Hesitation Before Going to School') of MBC survival show My Teenage Girl, but was eliminated on Episode 3 due to lack of votes from the judges.

=== 2022: Girlkind Tokyo Live 2022, disbandment ===
On March 26, 2022, the group announced their Japan concert series "GIRLKIND Tokyo Live 2022", which was held from April 16 to May 7 at Showbox in Shin-Okubo, Tokyo.

On August 13, 2022, Nextlevel Entertainment announced that the group has disbanded after a long period of discussion, because of internal issues.

== Discography ==
=== Extended plays ===
List of extended plays, with selected details, chart positions, and sales
Title	Details	Peak Chart Position	Sales
Title	Details	KOR	Sales
Life Is Diamond	Released: August 28, 2019; Label: Nextlevel Entertainment, Stone Music Entertainment; Format: CD, Digital Download; Tracklist: 1. MONEY TALK (머니토크); 2. All You Want; 3. Vibe on (Malachi Mott Remix); 4. I.Land (Tropical House mix); 5. SPLIT (Feat. Tommy $trate)	75	48

=== Singles ===
Title	Year	Peak chart positions	Sales	Album
Title	Year	KOR	Sales	Album
"FANCI"	2018	—	N/A	Fanci
"S.O.R.R.Y"	2018	—	N/A	S.O.R.R.Y
"Future (퓨쳐)"	2020	—	N/A	Future (퓨쳐)
"Psycho4U"	2020	—	N/A	Psycho4U
"Good Vibes Only (이 분위기에 취해)"	2021	188	N/A	Good Vibes Only (이 분위기에 취해)
"—" denotes releases that did not chart or were not released in that region.

== Concerts ==
- Girlkind Tokyo Live 2022 (2022)
