= Botopass =

South Korean girl group

- Origin: Seoul, South Korea
- Genres: K-pop
- Years active: 2020–2022
- Labels: WKS ENE, JMG
- Past members: Mihee; Jiwon; Cui Xiang; Seoyoon; Ria; Harin; Shiho; Ahyoon
- Website: www.wksene.com/artist

Botopass (Korean: 보토패스; Born to be Passion) was a South Korean girl group formed by WKS ENE and JMG in 2020. The group debuted on August 26, 2020, with Flamingo. The group consisted of 8 members: Mihee, Jiwon, Cui Xiang, Seoyoon, Ria, Harin, Shiho and Ahyoon. The group officially disbanded on August 25, 2022, without two years of activity.

== History ==
=== 2020–2022: Bullying controversy, Debut with Flamingo and disbandment ===
Prior to debuting in Botopass, Cui Xiang, Seoyoon and Jiwon were members of WKS ENE's previous girl group ILuv. The group was originally scheduled to debut in early August, however it was postponed due to a former ILuv member, Minah, accusing fellow members of bullying her. As a result of this, people began to demand that the three ILuv members be removed from the line-up. The group debuted on August 26, with the single album, Flamingo, and the full original line-up.

In September 2021, Mihee was confirmed to be a participant in the MBC survival show My Teenage Girl and temporarily went on hiatus from the group.

On August 25, 2022, the group officially disbanded, 2 years after their official debut.

== Members ==
- Mihee (미희)
- Jiwon (지원)
- Cui Xiang (최상)
- Seoyoon (서윤)
- Ria (리아)
- Harin (하린)
- Shiho (시호)
- Ahyoon (아윤)

== Discography ==
=== Single albums ===
Title	Album details	Peak chart positions	Sales
Title	Album details	KOR	Sales
Flamingo	Released: August 26, 2020; Label: WKS ENE, JMG; Formats: CD, digital download	71	KOR: 620
