= Classy (group) =

South Korean girl group

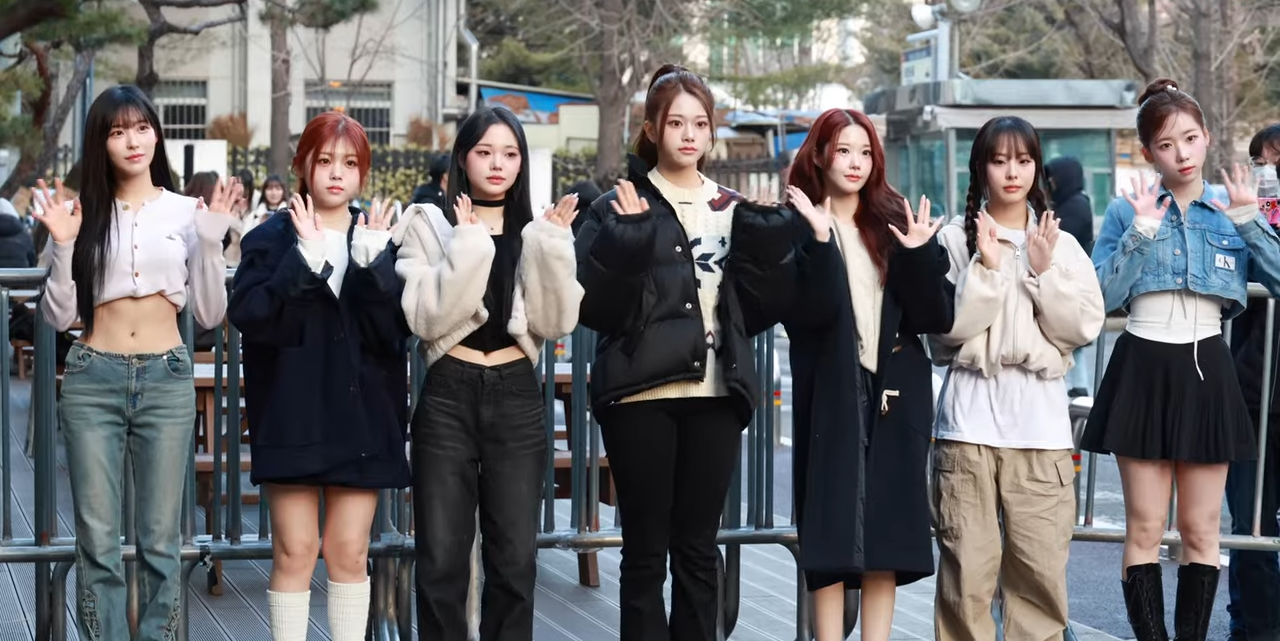
- Classy in January 2024

Background information
- Origin: Seoul, South Korea
- Genre: K-pop
- Years active: 2022–present
- Labels: M25; Universal Japan; K-Tigers Entertainment
- Members: Myung Hyung-seo; Yoon Chae-won; Hong Hye-ju; Kim Ri-won; Won Ji-min; Park Bo-eun; Kim Seon-you

Classy (/ˈklæsi/; Korean: 클라씨; RR: Keullassi; stylized as CLASSy or formerly CLASS:y) is a South Korean girl group formed through the MBC reality competition show My Teenage Girl. The group consists of seven members: Won Ji-min, Kim Seon-you, Myung Hyung-seo, Hong Hye-ju, Kim Ri-won, Park Bo-eun, and Yoon Chae-won. They officially debuted on May 5, 2022, with the extended play (EP) Class Is Over.

== Name ==
The group's name, Class:y, was suggested by the viewers of My Teenage Girl through the website Naver and chosen by M25. It was inspired by the members' "classy" charms and continued the school-related theme of My Teenage Girl, referencing "class" and "highest grade".

== Career ==
=== Formation through My Teenage Girl ===
Classy was formed through the MBC reality competition show My Teenage Girl which aired from November 28, 2021, to February 27, 2022. It featured 83 female contestants from different countries. During the live finale on February 27, 2022, the final members were determined by viewers through voting and points.

Myung Hyung-seo is a former member of Busters, while Kim Ri-won is a former child actress and model.

=== 2022–2023: Debut, Class is Over, Lives Across, Day&Night and Dancing Dol Stage ===
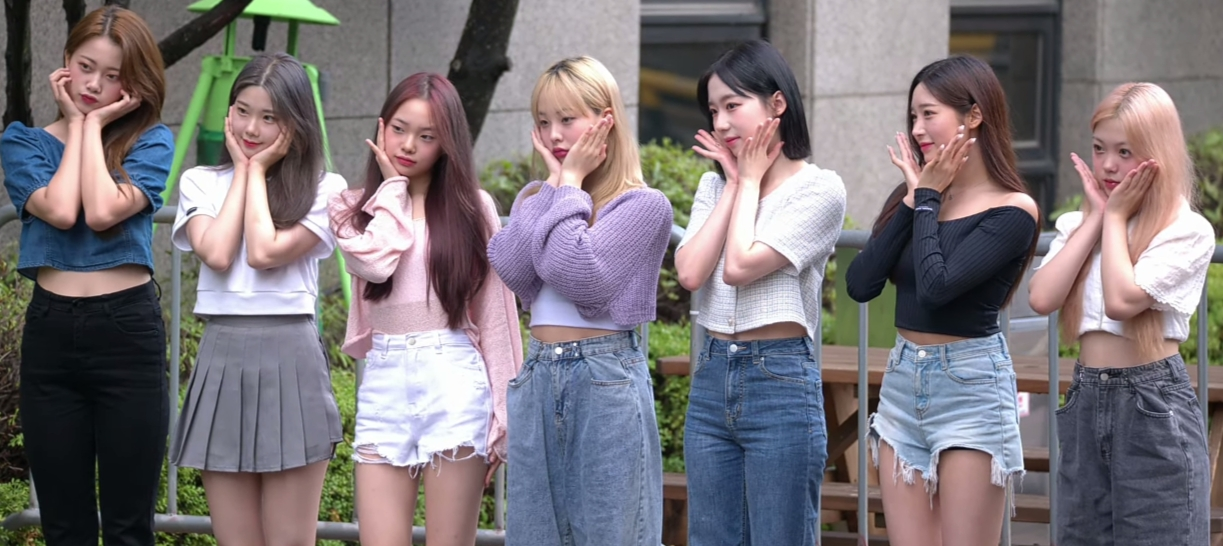
Classy in July 2022

In March, the group performed the song "Surprise" on various music shows. Their debut extended play, Class Is Over, was released on May 5. On May 26, 2022, Classy released their second series of their debut extended play, Lives Across. On May 10, they announced they will make their Japanese debut with the Japanese version of their Korean debut lead single "Shut Down" on June 22. On September 20, it was confirmed that Classy will make a comeback with a new album on October 26, 2022. On October 11, Classy posted a picture of their new album Day&Night schedule via SNS. In November, it was announced Classy would release a Japanese album in January 2023. On November 22, it was announced Classy will participate as a contestant in second season of the SBS reality competition show Dancing Dol Stage. On December 21, it was announced that Classy would return with their second Japanese single titled Target and hold their first fan concert in Japan in February 2023.

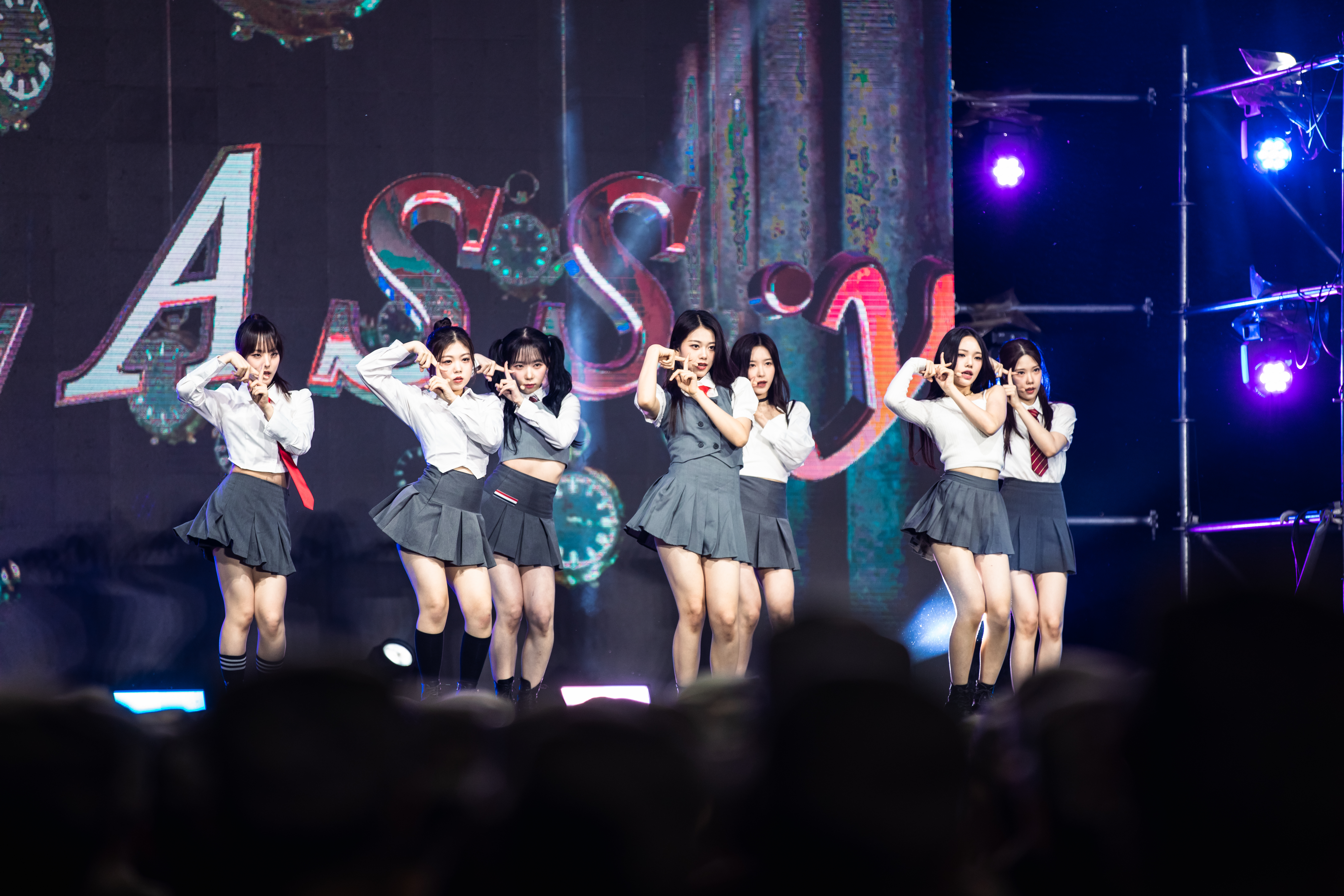
Classy performing in 2023

On February 7, 2023, it was announced Classy would be a contestant in their third survival show, The Next - Battle of The K-Pop Girl Groups.

=== 2024–present: Love XX and switching of companies ===
After a two-year hiatus, Classy announced the release of their third extended play Love XX on November 14, 2024. It was later revealed that the EP would contain two tracks.

In November 2025, Classy signed with K-Tigers Entertainment, replacing M25 as their managing agency. On June 23, 2026, Re:Boot (After the Tears) was released with title track "Tear Drops". All the members had their own solos for this mini album. Chaewon would release another solo, "Love Me More", on October 30, 2026.

== Members ==
- Myung Hyung-seo (명형서)
- Yoon Chae-won (윤채원)
- Hong Hye-ju (홍혜주)
- Kim Ri-won (김리원)
- Won Ji-min (원지민)
- Park Bo-eun (박보은)
- Kim Seon-you (김선유)

== Discography ==
=== Extended plays ===
List of extended plays, showing selected details, selected chart positions and sales figures
Title	Details	Peak chart positions	Sales
Title	Details	KOR	Sales
Class is Over	Released: May 5, 2022; Label: M25, Kakao Entertainment; Formats: CD, digital download, streaming; Track listing: 1. "Up"; 2. "Shut Down"; 3. "Tell Me One More Time"; 4. "Super Cool"; 5. "Feelin' So Good"	7	KOR: 28,777
Lives Across	Released: May 26, 2022; Label: M25, Interpark; Formats: CD, digital download, streaming; Track listing: 1. "Classy"; 2. "Surprise"; 3. "Same Same Different"; 4. "Divin' Into You"	25	KOR: 14,768
Day & Night	Released: October 26, 2022; Label: M25, Kakao Entertainment; Formats: CD, digital download, streaming; Track listing: 1. "Tick Tick Boom"; 2. "Zealous"	18	KOR: 23,201
Love XX	Released: November 15, 2024; Label: M25, Kakao Entertainment; Formats: CD, digital download, streaming; Track listing: 1. "Psycho and Beautiful"; 2. "Love Game"; 3. "Psycho and Beautiful" (Inst.); 4. "Love Game" (Inst.)	10	KOR: 12,805
Re:Boot (After the Tears)	Released: June 23, 2026; Label: K-Tigers Entertainment, VOSTOK by Mound Media; Formats: CD, digital download, streaming; Track listing: 1. "After the Tears"; 2. "Tear Drop"; 3. "On My Way" (Myung Hyung-seo solo); 4. "Pigeon" (Kim Seon-you solo); 5. "Spinning Coin" (Hong Hye-ju solo) (feat. Xitsuh); 6. "Stay Together" (Kim Ri-won solo); 7. "Youth" (Yoon Chae-won solo); 8. "Intoxicated" (Park Bo-eun solo); 9. "Without You" (Won Ji-min solo) (feat. twlv)	24	KOR: 3,586
"—" denotes a recording that did not chart or was not released in that territory.

=== Singles ===
==== Korean singles ====
List of Korean singles, showing year released, selected chart positions, and album
Title	Year	Peak chart positions	Album
Title	Year	KOR DL	Album
"Shut Down"	2022	75	Class Is Over
"Classy"	2022	158	Lives Across
"Surprise"	2022	—	Lives Across
"Tick Tick Boom"	2022	54	Day & Night
"Zealous"	2022	84	Day & Night
"My Love"	2023	—	Non-album singles
"Winter Bloom"	2023	—	Non-album singles
"Psycho and Beautiful"	2024	123	Love XX
"Tear Drop" (눈물이 난 채로 걷는 게 나다운 거라서)	2026	52	Re:boot (After Tears)
"—" denotes a recording that did not chart or was not released in that territory.

==== Japanese singles ====
List of Japanese singles, showing year released, selected chart positions, and album
Title	Year	Peak chart positions	Sales	Album
Title	Year	JPN	Sales	Album
"Shut Down" (Japanese ver.)	2022	24	JPN: 3,560 (phy.)	Non-album singles
"Target"	2023	20	JPN: 2,996 (phy.)	Non-album singles
"Crack-Crack-Crackle"	2023	—	—N/a	Non-album singles
"—" denotes a recording that did not chart or was not released in that territory.

=== Other appearances ===
Title	Year	Album
"In Summer"	2022	New Festa Episode.9
"Classy"	2022	New Festa Episode.9
"Can I Call it Love" (사랑이라 부를 수 있을까)	2022	Summer Vacation Project Vol.4

== Videography ==
=== Music videos ===
Title	Year	Director
"Shut Down"	2022	Sung Gyun Yoo (Sunny Visual)
"Classy"	2022	
"SAME SAME DIFFERENT -JP Ver.-"	2022	
"SHUT DOWN -JP Ver.-"	2022	
"Can I Call It Love"	2022	
"Tick Tick Boom"	2022	Cha Eun-taek
"Zealous"	2022	Cha Eun-taek
"Target"	2023	SLO Video
"My Love"	2023	
"Winter Bloom"	2023	Hyeju and Seonyu
"Psycho and Beautiful"	2024	
"Tear Drop"	2026	박신준

== Filmography ==
=== Television shows ===
Year	Title	Notes	Ref.
2022	My Teenage Girl	Contestant; Survival show determining Classy members	
2022	Class:y's World	Debut reality show	

=== Web shows ===
Year	Title	Notes	Ref.
2022	Class:y's Lab	Variety Show	
2023	Dancing Dol Stage: Season 2	Contestant; 1st Place	
2023	The Next - Battle of The K-Pop Girl Groups	Contestant	

== Concerts ==
Classy Japan Fan Concert "Steal Your Heart" (2023)
Date	City	Country	Venue
February 22, 2023	Osaka	Japan	Music Club Janus
February 23, 2023	Tokyo	Japan	Shibuya Stream Hall

=== Concert participation ===
- Dream Concert in Japan (2023)

== Awards and nominations ==
Name of the award ceremony, year presented, award category, nominee(s) of the award, and the result of the nomination
Award ceremony	Year	Category	Nominee(s)/work(s)	Result	Ref.
Asia Model Awards	2022	Rookie of the Year – Singer	Classy	Won	
Hanteo Music Awards	2023	Rookie of the Year – Singer	Classy	Nominated	
Mnet Japan Fans Choice Awards	2022	Rookie of the Year – Singer	Classy	Nominated	
Mnet Japan Fans Choice Awards	2022	Ending Fairy of the Year	Classy	Nominated	
Mnet Japan Fans Choice Awards	2022	Killing Part of the Year	Classy	Nominated	
Seoul Music Awards	2023	K-Wave Popularity	Classy	Nominated	
Seoul Music Awards	2023	Rookie of the Year	Classy	Nominated	
