= My Teenage Girl =

South Korean reality competition series

- Also known as: Teenage Girls 放課後のときめき (Japanese)
- Hangul: 방과후 설렘
- Hanja: 放課後 설렘
- Lit.: Excitement After School
- RR: Banggwahu seollem
- MR: Panggwahu sŏllem
- Genre: Reality competition
- Written by: Han Dong-chul
- Directed by: Han Dong-chul
- Presented by: Yoon Kyun-sang
- Opening theme: "Same Same Different" by My Teenage Girl contestants
- Country of origin: South Korea
- Original language: Korean
- No. of episodes: 12 (list of episodes)

Production
- Producer: Han Dong-chul
- Running time: 90–125 minutes
- Production companies: MBC; Phunky Studio; Naver; PocketDol Studio

Original release
- Network: MBC TV
- Release: November 28, 2021 – February 27, 2022

Related
- Fantasy Boys (2023)

My Teenage Girl (Korean: 방과후 설렘) was a South Korean reality competition series created by MBC. It was intended to form a seven-member girl group with the potential to chart on Billboard. The contestants were put into age groups that specialize in vocals, rapping, and performance. A joint production between MBC and Phunky Studio (the company founded by Han Dong-chul of Produce 101), the show premiered on November 28, 2021, and was broadcast every Sunday at 9 pm KST for 12 weekly episodes until its finale on February 27, 2022. The finale was broadcast live and announced the seven winners to form Classy.

Over 30,000 applications were submitted from different countries and 83 contestants were chosen. The 83 contestants were separated into four groups based on their ages.

A second season titled Fantasy Boys aired in 2023.

== Concept ==
The show was intended to form a global seven-member girl group with the goal on becoming a Billboard chart-in.

On June 1, 2021, the first video teaser was released. Applications for the show were open from June 1 to 30, 2021, for any female individual born in 2010 or earlier. By the time applications closed, 30,000 applications were submitted from countries such as the United States, Japan, Canada, and South America, as well as South Korea.

In September 2021, the contestants and their assigned groups were revealed through teaser videos.

== Promotion and broadcast ==
From September 14 to November 12, 2021, a prequel season for the competition titled Hesitation Before Going to School (등교 전 망설임; Deunggyo jeon mangseorim) was aired on Naver Now. During the season, the contestant profiles for all 83 contestants were released. Only 40 contestants (10 from each group) would actually participate in My Teenage Girl.

Each group performed separately on Show! Music Core, a weekly music program broadcast on MBC. Interviews with six contestants were broadcast before the performances.

On October 20, 2021, Girls' Generation's Yuri, (G)I-dle's Soyeon, and former Fin.K.L member Ock Joo-hyun joined the cast of the show as mentors (also known as "homeroom teachers").

On February 9, 2022, a rhythm game titled Superstar Teenage Girls was announced by Dalcomsoft and is based on the show. The game contains songs and performances from the show, as well as special cards for the 14 finalists. The game was released for mobile devices on February 23, 2022.

On February 26, 2022, the day before the live finale, the 14 finalists performed two original songs, "Lions" and "Sonic Boom", on Show! Music Core.

== Cast ==
Host: Yoon Kyun-sang

Homeroom Teachers (also known as mentors):

- Jeon So-yeon
- Kwon Yu-ri
- Ock Joo-hyun
- Aiki

Vocal Teachers:

- Youngji
- Lisa

Dance Teachers:

- Ryu Jae-jun
- Aiki (Hesitation Before Going to School)

Rap Teachers:

- Hanhae
- Minos

Guests:

- Oh Eun-young – "mother" (Hesitation Before Going to School)
- Lee Eun-ji – "older sister" (Hesitation Before Going to School)
- Jang Do-yeon – "head of admissions" (episodes 1–3)
- Leeteuk – special host
- Shindong – special host
- Seunghee – special host
- Kwon Eun-bi – fan meeting host
- Jangjun – fan meeting host (session two)

== Episodes ==
=== Episode 1 (November 28, 2021) ===
The show starts with performances by the mentors known as the "homeroom teachers", who would assess the contestants known as the "students" and help them succeed in the show. Shortly after, Yoon Kyun-sang was introduced as the host of the show known as the "messenger" and explains the first mission known as the "Entrance Exam". In the first mission, the contestants perform their songs introduced in Hesitation Before Going to School and each would be assessed by the audience and the mentors. There are two rounds for each performance. To pass the first round, the contestants must receive at least 75% of the votes from the audience before being assessed by the mentors. To pass the second round, each contestant must receive at least three votes from the mentors before being sent to a classroom according to their group. Only 40 contestants (10 from each group) would move on to the second mission while those who fail a round or have their group full would be eliminated. 23 contestants performed first in this episode, with 15 moving on to the second mission and the other 8 being eliminated after failing a round.

=== Episode 2 (December 5, 2021) ===
The first mission continues with performances by 26 contestants. During the mentors' assessment of one of the performing teams from Grade 3, Ryou Jay-hyun was mistakenly eliminated after the voting system miscounted her votes with two, but was able to move on to the second mission after another vote from one of the mentors was added to the voting system. Unaired performances by some performing acts were aired with results for each performing act. Out of 26 contestants performing in this episode, 21 moved on to the second mission while the other 5 were eliminated after failing a round.

=== Episode 3 (December 12, 2021) ===
The first mission continues with performances by the other 34 contestants. At the end of the first mission, the remaining contestants noticed there would be a change on the number of contestants who would move on to the second mission. Due to an excessive number of contestants, each group would have 16 contestants instead of the original 10 and some contestants who were originally eliminated returned to the show, bringing a total of 64 passers for the first round. The mentors held a meeting to discuss and decide who would mentor each group. The results for the mentors were revealed and each was assigned a group: Jeon So-yeon became the mentor for Grade 4, Ock Joo-hyun became the mentor for Grade 3, Kwon Yu-ri became the mentor for Grade 2, and Aiki became the mentor for Grade 1. Following the addition of originally eliminated contestants, the second mission known as the "Grade Battle" was revealed. In the second mission, each group competes against each other and would be assessed by the audience and the mentors. The winning group is exempt from elimination and the other groups face elimination. After the mid-point check of each group, the mentors noticed only 40 contestants (10 from each group) would actually perform in the second mission, forcing themselves to eliminate 24 contestants (six from each group) from the show. Six contestants from Grade 2 who performed poorly in the mid-point check were eliminated first.

=== Episode 4 (December 19, 2021) ===
The episode starts with eliminations by 18 other contestants (six from each group). Before the eliminations, each of the three other groups performed in the mid-point check to determine the eliminated contestants. In a survey that was held after the mid-point check, Grade 4 was chosen as the "weakest" group for not practicing enough before the mid-point check. Following the eliminations in the mid-point check, the second mission begins. Before each group performed, the first individual ranking announcement was held with the top seven being revealed for the first time. According to Yoon Kyun-sang, the group with the highest score in each round would take a spot in the forming group one by one, making the latter consist of seven contestants regardless of their winning groups. Grade 3's Kim Hyun-hee ranked first out of the 40 remaining contestants, making the first spot in the forming group available to a Grade 3 contestant.

Following the first individual ranking announcement, grades 3 and 4 performed first with results after each performance. Choi Yoon-jung and Yoon Chae-won received the highest scores in their respective groups and performed Hwasa's "Twit" to show their skills.

=== Episode 5 (December 26, 2021) ===
The episode starts with final results for grades 3 and 4 in the second mission. Kim Min-ji and Kim Da-som were nominated for elimination after receiving the lowest scores in their respective groups. According to the rules for the second mission, the nominee in the losing group would be eliminated from the show. Grade 4 won against Grade 3 in the second mission, resulting in Kim Min-ji being eliminated from the show.

Following the final results for grades 3 and 4, grades 1 and 2 performed with results after each performance. Kim Seon-you and Kim Ri-won received the highest scores in their respective groups and performed Chungha's "Snapping" to show their skills. Oh Yoo-jin and Ju Hyo-rin were nominated for elimination after receiving the lowest scores in their respective groups. Grade 1 won against Grade 2 in the second mission, resulting in Ju Hyo-rin being eliminated from the show.

The second mission ends with Yoon Kyun-sang announcing the third mission known as the "Concept Battle". In the third mission, the winning and the losing groups collaborate and compete against each other using different concepts and would be assessed by the audience and the mentors. The winning groups compete for first place while the losing groups compete for third place. The winning group ranked first and the losing group ranked third are exempt from elimination, the former of which would take the second spot in the forming group. Grades 2 and 3 were divided into teams and must choose one of the following concepts: pretty, competent, or talented. The team choosing the "pretty" concept performs Oh My Girl's "Dun Dun Dance". The team choosing the "competent" concept performs Beyoncé's "Run the World (Girls)". The team choosing the "talented" concept performs Red Velvet's "Red Flavor". The "pretty" and the "competent" teams performed first with results after each performance.

=== Episode 6 (January 2, 2022) ===
The episode starts with the "talented" team from the previous episode performing. After the team's performance, the results for the team were announced with feedback from the mentors. Following the performances by grades 2 and 3, the final results for both groups were announced with Grade 2 ranking third. Grade 3 ranked fourth in the third mission and faced elimination. According to the rules, the contestant in the losing group with the fewest votes from the viewers would be eliminated. Park Hyo-lim was eliminated from the show for receiving the fewest votes from the viewers.

Following Park Hyo-lim's elimination, grades 1 and 4 performed, but were assigned the same concepts as grades 2 and 3 and divided into teams. The team choosing the "pretty" concept performs Iz*One's "La Vie en Rose". The team choosing the "competent" concept performs CL's "Hello Ladies". The team choosing the "talented" concept performs Hyuna's "I'm Not Cool". Each team formed by grades 1 and 4 performed with results after each performance. Following the performances by grades 1 and 4, the final results for both groups were announced with Grade 1 ranking first and taking the second spot in the forming group. Grade 4 ranked second in the third mission and faced elimination. Kim Da-som was eliminated from the show for receiving the fewest votes from the viewers. The episode ends with Yoon Kyun-sang announcing the fourth mission known as the "Position Battle".

=== Episode 7 (January 9, 2022) ===
The episode starts with the introduction of the fourth mission known as the "Position Battle". In the fourth mission, each group collaborates and competes against each other based on their positions. They can only perform based on the following positions: vocal, rap, dance, or a combination of the three positions known as "all-rounder". For each position, the remaining contestants are divided into small teams and perform a song that best fits their musical abilities. Before the fourth mission, the second individual ranking announcement was held with changes in the top seven. Grade 4's Myung Hyung-seo and Yoon Chae-won entered the top seven for the first time, the latter of which replaced Grade 3's Kim Hyun-hee in first place and made the third spot in the forming group available to a Grade 4 contestant. Following the second individual ranking announcement, the vocal and dance teams performed first with rehearsals before each performance.

=== Episode 8 (January 16, 2022) ===
The fourth mission continues with performances by the remaining teams. Rehearsals were held before each remaining performance to check the remaining contestants' performance skills. By the end of the fourth mission, the remaining spots in the forming group were revealed, resulting in the completion of the forming group. The group formed by the show would consist of one contestant from Grade 2 and two contestants each from other groups. Prior to the completion of the forming group, the final results for each remaining contestant were revealed based on the viewers' votes. The three contestants from each alliance with the fewest votes from the viewers would be eliminated from the show. Grade 1's Jung Yu-ju and Jung Si-woo, Grade 2's Park Hyo-won, Grade 3's Ryou Jay-hyun and Kim Su-hye, and Grade 4's Lee Yu-min were eliminated from the show for receiving the fewest votes in their respective alliances.

The fourth mission ends with Yoon Kyun-sang announcing the fifth mission known as the "Representative Selection". In the fifth mission, each group competes against themselves and forms two small teams to perform an assigned song. When each team finishes performing their song, both teams perform a dance break combining both songs. Grade 3 formed two trios and performed first with the following songs: Twice's "Likey" and Mamamoo's "Hip".

=== Episode 9 (January 23, 2022) ===
The fifth mission continues with performances by other groups. After Grade 4's performances, the first representatives of the forming group were revealed based on their votes during the fifth mission. Grade 1's Kim Seon-you and Park Bo-eun, Grade 2's Kim Ri-won, Grade 3's Kim Hyun-hee and Kim Yun-seo, and Grade 4's Yoon Chae-won and Kim Yoo-yeon became the first representatives of the forming group after receiving the most votes in their respective groups. Shortly after, eliminations for other contestants were held. The nine contestants with the fewest votes from the viewers would be eliminated from the show. Grades 1 and 2 eliminated four contestants each while Grade 4 eliminated Song Ye-rim from the show. Grade 3 became the only group who survived the eliminations, meaning the remaining contestants in that group survived.

The fifth mission ends with Yoon Kyun-sang announcing the sixth mission known as the "Representative Takeover". In the sixth mission, the representatives of the forming group compete against 14 other contestants known as "challengers". The 14 contestants are divided into two teams of seven and are assigned the following songs: Everglow's "Dun Dun" and Itzy's "Mafia in the Morning". The representatives of the forming group perform an original song titled "Surprise". The members of the winning team would perform with the representatives of the forming group separately. The episode ends with two contestants forming a trio with a representative of the forming group.

=== Episode 10 (January 30, 2022) ===
The sixth mission continues with the formation of the two "challenger" teams by doing a spinning challenge. Shortly after, both teams do splits to determine which team would perform first. Team B performed first after winning the split challenge. Before Team B's performance, the representatives of the forming group performed "Surprise" to showcase their skills as a team. Shortly after, both "challenger" teams performed to determine which team would perform with the representatives of the forming group. Team B won against Team A with 356 votes, the latter of which was nominated for elimination after losing with 282 votes. The representatives of the forming group start their battles against members of Team B, with Yoon Chae-won and Lee Tae-rim performing first with Rosé's "On the Ground". Yoon Chae-won remained as a representative of the forming group after winning against Lee Tae-rim. The episode ends with Kim Seon-you and Choi Yoon-jung performing (G)I-dle's "Lion", the latter of which replaced the former as a representative of the forming group.

=== Episode 11 (February 20, 2022) ===
This episode was originally scheduled to air on February 6, 2022; however, the episode was delayed to February 20 due to the 2022 Winter Olympics, as well as two scheduled online fan meetings overlapping the episode's broadcast.

The sixth mission continues with performances by the remaining representatives of the forming group and members of Team B. By the end of the sixth mission, Grade 1's Park Bo-eun and Grade 4's Yoon Chae-won and Kim Yoo-yeon remained as representatives of the forming group. Grade 2's Minami, Grade 3's Choi Yoon-jung, and Grade 4's Hong Hye-ju and Myung Hyung-seo became representatives of the forming group after replacing four original representatives during the sixth mission. The representatives were exempt from elimination and automatically moved on to the live finale. Shortly after, Yoon Kyun-sang announced the other seven finalists by their ranks in descending order. The seven nominees with the fewest votes from the viewers were eliminated from the show and finished as semi-finalists. Grade 2 became the only group whose remaining contestants moved on to the live finale. The episode ends with Yoon Kyun-sang announcing the final mission with live performances.

=== Episode 12 (February 27, 2022) ===
The finale was originally scheduled to air on February 13, 2022; however, the finale was delayed to February 27 due to the 2022 Winter Olympics, as well as a scheduled online fan meeting overlapping the finale's broadcast.

The finale starts with the 14 finalists appearing on-stage. Prior to their appearances, the group name was briefly revealed as Classy to introduce the forming group. Immediately after the 14 finalists appear on-stage, Yoon Kyun-sang explains the final mission. In the final mission, both teams compete against each other while performing two songs. One of the two songs performed by each team is introduced to the viewers as part of the final mission. The team with the highest score would earn 50,000 points as a benefit. Live voting was open during the final mission to determine the final members of Classy. Prior to the closure of live voting, the results for both teams were announced, with the "challenger" team winning against the representatives with 478 points. Shortly after, the 14 finalists thanked their mentors for helping them succeed in the show. The final results for the finalists were announced to form Classy. The finalists finishing in the top seven would become members of Classy. Park Bo-eun was announced as the first member of Classy after finishing in sixth place. The finalists ranked third to fifth were Myung Hyung-seo, Hong Hye-ju, and Kim Ri-won, respectively. Won Ji-min and Kim Seon-you were announced as candidates for first place, the former of which finished in first place with 243,302.4 points. Yoon Chae-won was announced as the last member of Classy after finishing in seventh place. The show ends with the final top 14 appearing on-screen to announce those who failed to become a member of Classy.

== Contestants ==
Prior to the premiere, 83 contestants participated in Hesitation Before Going to School. The contestants are listed by their final ranks.

The English names of Korean and Chinese contestants are presented in Eastern order according to the official website while Japanese contestants' names are presented in Western order. The English spelling of contestants' names are taken from their official profiles.

For Japanese and Chinese contestants, their Korean names are listed along with their respective languages' names.

Color Key

Final members of Classy
Eliminated in the final episode
Eliminated in the sixth elimination round
Eliminated in the fifth elimination round
Eliminated in the fourth elimination round
Eliminated in the third elimination round
Eliminated in the second elimination round (Performance)
Eliminated in the second elimination round (Mid-point check)
Eliminated in the first elimination round
Left the show

83 contestants
4th Grade (1998–2003)
Myung Hyungseo (명형서)	Hong Hyeju (홍혜주)	Yoon Chaewon (윤채원)	Kim Yooyeon (김유연)	Lee Mihee (이미희)
Kim Inhye (김인혜)	Kim Hari (김하리)	Song Yerim (송예림)	Lee Yumin (이유민)	Kim Dasom (김다솜)
Jo Yujeong (조유정)	Choe Sumin (최수민)	Lee Hayoung (이하영)	Kang Minji (강민지)	Go Taehui (고태희)
Jeon Youeun (전유은)	Kim Suyeon (김수연)	Bang Sunhee (방선희)	Lee Subin (이수빈)	Kang Eunwoo (강은우)
Wei Yi (魏毅) (웨이)	Zhuang Yihan (庄亦涵) (장이한)			
3rd Grade (2004–2005)
Kim Hyunhee (김현희)	Kim Yunseo (김윤서)	Choi Yoonjung (최윤정)	Lee Taerim (이태림)	Lee Jiwoo (이지우)
Oh Jieun (오지은)	Kim Suhye (김수혜)	Ryou Jayhyun (유재현)	Park Hyolim (박효림)	Kim Minji (김민지)
Kim Nahyun (김나현)	Koo Hyunkyoung (구현경)	Kim Jiyeon (김지연)	Choi Yunju (최윤주)	Shin Yeseul (신예슬)
Kim Lina (김리나)	Cho Yeju (조예주) (Note: Left the show in episode 3 due to a collarbone injury.)	Lee Jaye (이재이)	Kim Minseo (김민서)	Lee Pureun (이푸른)
2nd Grade (2006–2007)
Won Jimin (원지민)	Kim Riwon (김리원)	Lee Youngchae (이영채)	Minami (Note: Full name: Minami Ito (伊藤 南美)) (南美) (미나미)	Cho Sui (조수이)
Choi Sarang (최사랑)	Karina Takei (武井 カリーナ) (타케이 카리나)	Lee Jiwon (이지원)	Park Hyowon (박효원)	Ju Hyorin (주효린)
Lee Seungeun (이승은)	Hina Fukumoto (福本 陽菜) (후쿠모토 히나)	Lee Seoyoon (이서윤)	Park Yoora (박유라)	Lee Hadam (이하담)
Lee Sumin (이수민)	Cho Eun (조은)	Oh Jinkyoung (오진경)	Kwon Juan (권주안)	Kim Sujin (김수진)
Pak Jinhyun (박진현)	Kim Yeseo (김예서)	Kim Seojin (김서진)		
1st Grade (2008–2010)
Kim Seonyou (김선유)	Park Boeun (박보은)	Yoon Seungjoo (윤승주)	Kim Subeen (김수빈)	Choi Soobin (최수빈)
Sung Minchae (성민채)	Bohme Sara (보미세라)	Oh Yoojin (오유진)	Jung Yuju (정유주)	Jung Siwoo (정시우)
Park Haneum (박한음)	Ko Eunchae (고은채)	Kim Minjoo (김민주)	Lee Siyul (이시율)	Kim Minsol (김민솔)
Kim Jungyun (김정윤)	Choi Dasol (최다솔)	Kim Yumin (김유민)		

== Ranking ==
Color key

New Top 7

#	Ep. 4		Ep. 7		January 19, 2022		January 24, 2022		January 31, 2022		February 7, 2022		February 14, 2022		Ep. 12	
#	Contestant	Grade	Contestant	Grade	Contestant	Grade	Contestant	Grade	Contestant	Grade	Contestant	Grade	Contestant	Grade	Contestant	Grade
1	Kim Hyun-hee	3	Yoon Chae-won (↑12)	4	Yoon Chae-won (=)	4	Kim Yoo-yeon (↑1)	4	Kim Yoo-yeon (=)	4	Kim Seon-you (↑6)	1	Kim Seon-you (=)	1	Won Ji-min (↑6)	2
2	Kim Yun-seo	3	Kim Yoo-yeon (↑1)	4	Kim Yoo-yeon (=)	4	Yoon Chae-won (↓1)	4	Yoon Chae-won (=)	4	Kim Yoo-yeon (↓1)	4	Kim Yoo-yeon (=)	4	Kim Seon-you (↑4)	1
3	Kim Yoo-yeon	4	Kim Ri-won (↑1)	2	Park Bo-eun (↑2)	1	Park Bo-eun (=)	1	Park Bo-eun (=)	1	Kim Ri-won (↑2)	2	Park Bo-eun (↑3)	1	Myung Hyung-seo (↑1)	4
4	Kim Ri-won	2	Kim Hyun-hee (↓3)	3	Myung Hyung-seo (↑3)	4	Kim Ri-won (↑1)	2	Won Ji-min (↑2)	2	Yoon Chae-won (↓2)	4	Kim Ri-won (↓1)	2	Hong Hye-ju (↑9)	4
5	Kim Seon-you	1	Park Bo-eun (↑1)	1	Kim Ri-won (↓2)	2	Kim Seon-you (↑1)	1	Kim Ri-won (↓1)	2	Won Ji-min (↓1)	2	Yoon Chae-won (↓1)	4	Kim Ri-won (=)	2
6	Park Bo-eun	1	Kim Yun-seo (↓4)	3	Kim Seon-you (↑6)	1	Won Ji-min (↑1)	2	Myung Hyung-seo (↑1)	4	Park Bo-eun (↓3)	1	Won Ji-min (↓1)	2	Park Bo-eun (↓3)	1
7	Won Ji-min	2	Myung Hyung-seo (↑1)	4	Won Ji-min (↑2)	2	Myung Hyung-seo (↓3)	4	Kim Seon-you (↓2)	1	Myung Hyung-seo (↓1)	4	Myung Hyung-seo (=)	4	Yoon Chae-won (↓6)	4

=== First Voting Period ===
Rank	Episode 4			
Rank	1st Grade	2nd Grade	3rd Grade	4th Grade
1	Kim Seon-you	Kim Ri-won	Kim Hyun-hee	Kim Yoo-yeon
2	Park Bo-eun	Won Ji-min	Kim Yun-seo	Myung Hyung-seo
3	Oh Yoo-jin	Minami	Choi Yoon-jung	Yoon Chae-won
4	Choi Su-bin	Lee Young-chae	Lee Ji-woo	Lee Mi-hee
5	Bohme Sara	Lee Ji-won	Kim Su-hye	Kim Ha-ri
6	Kim Su-been	Ju Hyo-rin	Lee Tae-rim	Hong Hye-ju
7	Jung Yu-ju	Choi Sa-rang	Oh Ji-eun	Lee Yu-min
8	Yoon Seung-joo	Cho Su-i	Park Hyo-lim	Kim In-hye
9	Sung Min-chae	Karina Takei	Ryou Jay-hyun	Song Ye-rim
10	Jung Si-woo	Park Hyo-won	Kim Min-ji	Kim Da-som

=== Second Voting Period ===
Rank	Episode 7			
Rank	1st Grade	2nd Grade	3rd Grade	4th Grade
1	Park Bo-eun	Kim Ri-won	Kim Hyun-hee	Yoon Chae-won
2	Kim Seon-you	Minami	Kim Yun-seo	Kim Yoo-yeon
3	Kim Su-been	Won Ji-min	Choi Yoon-jung	Myung Hyung-seo
4	Oh Yoo-jin	Lee Young-chae	Lee Ji-woo	Kim Ha-ri
5	Choi Su-bin	Karina Takei	Lee Tae-rim	Lee Mi-hee
6	Yoon Seung-joo	Lee Ji-won	Oh Ji-eun	Song Ye-rim
7	Sung Min-chae	Choi Sa-rang	Kim Su-hye	Hong Hye-ju
8	Bohme Sara	Cho Su-i	Ryou Jay-hyun	Kim In-hye
9	Jung Yu-ju	Park Hyo-won		Lee Yu-min
10	Jung Si-woo			

=== Third Voting Period ===
Rank	January 19, 2022			
Rank	1st Grade	2nd Grade	3rd Grade	4th Grade
1	Park Bo-eun	Kim Ri-won	Kim Yun-seo	Yoon Chae-won
2	Kim Seon-you	Won Ji-min	Kim Hyun-hee	Kim Yoo-yeon
3	Yoon Seung-joo	Minami	Choi Yoon-jung	Myung Hyung-seo
4	Kim Su-been	Lee Young-chae	Lee Tae-rim	Lee Mi-hee
5	Choi Soo-bin	Cho Su-i	Lee Ji-woo	Kim In-hye
6	Oh Yoo-jin	Choi Sa-rang	Oh Ji-eun	Hong Hye-ju
7	Sung Min-chae	Takei Karina		Kim Ha-ri
8	Bohme Sara	Lee Ji-won		Song Ye-rim

=== Fourth Voting Period ===
Rank	January 24, 2022			
Rank	1st Grade	2nd Grade	3rd Grade	4th Grade
1	Park Bo-eun	Kim Ri-won	Kim Hyun-hee	Kim Yoo-yeon
2	Kim Seon-you	Won Ji-min	Kim Yun-seo	Yoon Chae-won
3	Yoon Seung-joo	Minami	Choi Yoon-jung	Myung Hyung-seo
4	Kim Su-been	Lee Young-chae	Oh Ji-eun	Lee Mi-hee
5			Lee Tae-rim	Kim In-hye
6			Lee Ji-woo	Hong Hye-ju
7				Kim Ha-ri

=== Fifth Voting Period ===
Rank	January 31, 2022			
Rank	1st Grade	2nd Grade	3rd Grade	4th Grade
1	Park Bo-eun	Won Ji-min	Kim Hyun-hee	Kim Yoo-yeon
2	Kim Seon-you	Kim Ri-won	Kim Yun-seo	Yoon Chae-won
3	Yoon Seung-joo	Minami	Choi Yoon-jung	Myung Hyung-seo
4	Kim Su-been	Lee Young-chae	Oh Ji-eun	Kim In-hye
5			Lee Tae-rim	Lee Mi-hee
6			Lee Ji-woo	Hong Hye-ju
7				Kim Ha-ri

=== Sixth Voting Period ===
Rank	February 7, 2022			
Rank	1st Grade	2nd Grade	3rd Grade	4th Grade
1	Kim Seon-you	Kim Ri-won	Kim Hyun-hee	Kim Yoo-yeon
2	Park Bo-eun	Won Ji-min	Kim Yun-seo	Yoon Chae-won
3	Yoon Seung-joo	Minami	Choi Yoon-jung	Myung Hyung-seo
4	Kim Su-been	Lee Young-chae	Oh Ji-eun	Kim In-hye
5			Lee Tae-rim	Hong Hye-ju
6			Lee Ji-woo	Lee Mi-hee
7				Kim Ha-ri

=== Seventh Voting Period ===
Rank	February 14, 2022			
Rank	1st Grade	2nd Grade	3rd Grade	4th Grade
1	Kim Seon-you	Kim Ri-won	Kim Hyun-hee	Kim Yoo-yeon
2	Park Bo-eun	Won Ji-min	Kim Yun-seo	Yoon Chae-won
3	Yoon Seung-joo	Lee Young-chae	Choi Yoon-jung	Myung Hyung-seo
4	Kim Su-been	Minami	Oh Ji-eun	Kim In-hye
5			Lee Tae-rim	Hong Hye-ju
6			Lee Ji-woo	Lee Mi-hee
7				Kim Ha-ri

=== Result ===
The finale was broadcast live on February 27, 2022. The finalists finishing in the top seven formed Classy.

Episode 12
Rank	Name	Grade	Points
1	Won Ji-min	2	243,302.4
2	Kim Seon-you	1	241,178.9
3	Myung Hyung-seo	4	217,370
4	Hong Hye-ju	4	210,647.9
5	Kim Ri-won	2	209,053.9
6	Park Bo-eun	1	201,684.4
7	Yoon Chae-won	4	198,915.5

== Discography ==
"Same Same Different"

Single by My Teenage Girl
- Released: October 2, 2021
- Genre: Moombahton; Dance
- Length: 3:35.
- Label: funky studio
- Composers: Scott Stoddart; Anna Timgren; Jeon Ryan
- Lyricists: Dohyun Nam; Sehee Jeong; Scott Stoddart; Anna Timgren; Jeon Ryan

=== Composition ===
"Same Same Different" is an electrifying moomba-infused dance anthem that pulses with a sizzling drum beat, deep 808 bass, and a catchy distorted flute hook. Its easy-to-follow lyrics reflecting themes of self-love and personal growth. The song captures the journey from chasing dreams to self-improvement, eschewing competition for inner development, and its focus on individual progress over rivalry. Through its sharp lyrics, "Same Same Different" illustrates a collective evolution, weaving a narrative of starting anew and chasing dreams together.

=== Performance and promotion ===
Aiki took charge of choreographing the song's stage, breaking away from previous styles to prioritize powerful performances and showcase both her trainees' passion and her own charismatic presence. With a diverse range of movements and meticulously structured routines, the performance exuded confidence, as noted by MK Sports reporter Nayoung Kim. Despite being pre-debut, the polished execution left audiences eager to see what the next grade's stage showcases would bring, reflecting an innovative approach that seamlessly extended their journey. The song was performed multiple times by the show's groups, debuting on MBC Show! Music Core, first was on October 2, followed by another performance on October 23. Then, on the 26th, after-school trainees from all grades made an appearance on SBS MTV's The Show, showcasing their talents to a wider audience.

My Teenage Girl Final

EP
- Released: February 28, 2022
- Recorded: doobdoob Studio; Cube Studio; M Creative Sound
- Genres: Soundtrack; K-pop; Dance
- Labels: Interpark Co., Ltd; funky studio
- Producers: Ollipop; Jeon Soyeon; Pop Time; Lindgren; Buzz

No.	Title	Lyrics	Music	Length
1.	"Dreaming"	Daeun Moon (MUMW); Seon (MUMW)	Olof Lindskog; Mayu Wakisaka; 72	3:39
2.	"Sun"	Jeon So-yeon	Jeon So-yeon; Pop Time	3:08
3.	"Lions"	Yujin Yeon (MUMW); Solhee	Melanie Fontana; Michel "Lindgren" Schulz; Miyavi Ishihara; 72	3:38
4.	"Sonic Boom"	Choerry (MUMW); Lee Dae-da (MUMW); Ji-turn (MUMW); Solhee)	Melanie Fontana; Michel "Lindgren" Schulz; GG Ramirez; BUZZ, 72	3:31

== Ratings ==
In the table below, the blue numbers represent the lowest ratings and the red numbers represent the highest ratings.

Ep.	Broadcast date	Nielsen Korea
Ep.	Broadcast date	Nationwide
1	November 28, 2021	1.9%
2	December 5, 2021	1.7%
3	December 12, 2021	1.0%
4	December 19, 2021	1.1%
5	December 26, 2021	1.4%
6	January 2, 2022	1.2%
7	January 9, 2022	1.2%
8	January 16, 2022	1.7%
9	January 23, 2022	1.3%
10	January 30, 2022	1.1%
11	February 20, 2022	1.3%
12	February 27, 2022	1.1%
Average		1.3%

== Aftermath ==
- Classy signed a seven-year exclusive contract with M25, a subsidiary of MBK Entertainment, and Universal Music Japan for group activities. The group made their official debut on May 5, 2022, with their debut extended play Y: Class Is Over. In November 2025, The group signed with K-Tigers Entertainment, replacing M25 as their managing agency.
Other contestants
- Some contestants returned to their original groups:
  - Lee Mi-hee returned to Botopass. The group disbanded on August 25, 2022.
  - Bang Sun-hee returned to Girlkind. The group disbanded on August 13, 2022.
- Some contestants debuted/will debut in groups:
  - Lee Ji-woo & Kim Yoo-yeon were introduced as tripleS' third & fifth members on June 1 & July 11, 2022, respectively.
  - Choi Yun-ju debuted in Mimiirose on September 16, 2022.
  - Kim Su-hye debuted in LimeLight on February 14, 2023.
  - Choi Sa-rang and Cho Su-i debuted in Candy Shop on March 27, 2024.
  - Kim Hyun-hee, under the stage name Hyunny, debuted in VVUP with the pre-debut single "Doo Doom Chit" on March 13, 2024. The 4-member girl group officially debuted on April 1, 2024. She left the group on August 29 the same year due to health issues.
  - Minami debuted in Rescene on March 26, 2024.
  - Kim Ji-yeon, under the stage name Zena, debuted in Bewave on April 17, 2024.
  - Kim In-hye (under the stage name Hu'e) and Kim Yun-seo debuted in Badvillain on June 3, 2024.
  - Yoon Seung-joo debuted in Say My Name on October 16, 2024.
  - Koo Hyun-kyoung, under the stage name Koo Han-na, debuted in UDTT with the pre-debut single "Retry" on December 11, 2024. The group will officially debut on April 29, 2025.
- Some contestants joined new agencies:
  - Lee Young-chae joined JXNEM and their trainee team JXNEM Girls. She left the agency sometime in 2022.
  - Go Tae-hui joined Kiana Entertainment.
  - Kim Su-hye joined 143 Entertainment.
  - Lee Ji-woo and Kim Yoo-yeon joined Modhaus.
  - Choi Yun-ju joined Yes Im Entertainment.
  - Bohme Sara joined Source Music.
  - Park Yoo-ra and Lee Ha-dam joined ON1 Entertainment.
  - Ryou Jay-hyun left ESteem Entertainment and joined SM Entertainment.
  - Choi Sa-rang and Cho Su-i joined Brave Entertainment.
  - Minami joined The Muze Entertainment.
  - Kim Min-sol joined WakeOne.
  - Kim Yun-seo and Kim In-hye joined BPM Entertainment.
  - Kim Ji-yeon joined GoldDust Entertainment.
  - Yoon Seung-joo joined iNKODE.
- Some contestants participated as contestants on other survival shows.
  - Jo Yu-jeong participated as a contestant on the survival show, U2U: Up to You.
  - Lee Ji-woo participated as a contestant on the survival show, Queendom Puzzle.
  - Kim Min-sol participated as a contestant on the survival show, I-Land 2: N/a.
  - Hina Fukumoto will participate as a contestant on the survival show, Unpretty Rapstar: HIP POP Princess.
