= List of Universe Ticket contestants =

Universe Ticket is a South Korean reality competition show produced by SBS, airing from 2023 to 2024. The program aimed to create an eight-member girl group with a contract lasting two years and six months. The final group, UNIS, debuted under F&F Entertainment, a newly established agency affiliated with the clothing brand F&F.

== Contestants ==
The show features a total of 82 contestants from various countries, all competing against one another through a series of performances, challenges, and eliminations for a chance to debut in a global girl group formed at the end of the competition. A complete lineup of contestants was unveiled via profile teasers released in two phases on July 13 and 17, 2023. The spelling of names in English is according to the official website. The Korean contestants are presented in Eastern order (family name, given name). The age listed is according to the Korean age system at the start of the competition.

Color Key:

Final member of Unis
Contestants eliminated in the final elimination round (Episode 10)
Contestants eliminated in the fourth elimination round (Episode 9)
Contestants eliminated in the third elimination round (Episode 7)
Contestants eliminated in the second elimination round (Episode 5/6)
Contestants eliminated in the first elimination round (Episode 4)
Contestants that left the show
Contestants that got promoted by the Unicorns
Top 8 of the round

Key:

P Level	4/4 stars
R Level	3/4 stars
I Level	2/4 stars
S Level	1/4 stars
M Level	0/4 stars

Company	Name	Age	Ranking								Final Rank	
Company	Name	Age	Battle Week		Road to PRISM						Final Rank	
Company	Name	Age	Ep. 1 (Note: As of November 18, 2023, at 21:00 KST.)	Ep. 4 (Note: As of December 8, 2023, at 00:00 KST.)	Ep. 5 (Note: Level Station)	Ep. 6 (Note: Level Station)	Ep. 7 (Note: Promotion Ceremony)	Ep. 8 (Note: Unit Station)	Ep. 9 (Note: Promotion Ceremony)	Ep. 10	Final Rank	
Individual Trainee (개인연습생)	Elisia (엘리시아)	15	11	5	High	0/4 stars	3	Vocal	1	1	Final Rank	1
F&F Entertainment (에프앤에프 엔터테인먼트)	Bang Yun-ha (방윤하)	15	31	35	High	1/4 stars	5	Vocal	7	2	2	
FNC Entertainment Japan (FNC 엔터테인먼트 재팬)	Nana (ナナ) / (나나) (Note: Nana and Yukino were contestant on Who Is Princess?.) (Note: Nana and Yukino are members of Prikil.)	16	19	20	Average	1/4 stars	1	Visual	4	3	3	
Individual Trainee (개인연습생)	Gehlee Dangca (젤리 당카)	16	22	8	Low	1/4 stars	2	Vocal	2	4	4	
Lean Branding	Lim Seo-won (임서원) (Note: Lim Seowon was a Music Love and Miss Trot 2 contestant.)	13	9	10	High	0/4 stars	4	Vocal	3	5	5	
J9 Entertainment	Jin Hyeon-ju (진현주) (Note: Jin Hyeon-ju was a member of Good Day under the stage name Lucky.) (Note: Jin Hyeon-ju was a contestant on The Unit: Idol Rebooting Project.) (Note: Jin Hyeon-ju is a member of girl group Cignature under the stage name Belle.)	23	6	26	High	0/4 stars	11	Vocal	10	6	6	
STARON Entertainment (스타온 엔터테인먼트)	Oh Yoon-a (오윤아) (Note: Ahn Seungbi, Bae Yeram, and Oh Yoona were members of Play With Me Club.) (Note: Oh Yoona was a pre-debut member of Free In Sass.)	15	49	9	Average	0/4 stars	12	Visual	5	7	7	
Individual Trainee (개인연습생)	Kotoko (琴子) / (코토코)	16	18	24	Average	0/4 stars	8	Visual	6	8	8	
FNC Entertainment (FNC 엔터테인먼트)	Hwang Si-eun (황시은)	15	5	32	High	0/4 stars	10	Visual	13	9	9	
Evermore Music (에버모어뮤직)	Lee Sun-woo (이선우) (Note: Choi Hyerin and Lee Sunwoo were contestants on Girls Planet 999.) (Note: Lee Sunwoo was a contestant on Stars Awakening.)	21	8	2	Average	0/4 stars	7	Vocal	9	10	10	
Individual Trainee (개인연습생)	Bae Ha-ram (배하람) (Note: Bae Haram and Bae Yeram were contestants on Kookmin Singer.) (Note: Bae Haram was a contestant on 100DNAcers.)	18	71	19	Average	1/4 stars	9	Performance	14	11	11	
Blade Music (블레이드 뮤직)	Kim Su-min (김수민)	19	13	18	Average	0/4 stars	18	Visual	8	12	12	
J Win Entertainment	Jeon Jin-yeong (전진영)	19	78	57	Average	0/4 stars	22	Performance	15	13	13	
Individual Trainee (개인연습생)	Narumi (なるみ) / (나루미)	18	53	22	Low	1/4 stars	15	Performance	11	14	14	
Individual Trainee (개인연습생)	Gabi (Note: Korean full name: Park Gabi (박가비) Full name: Gabi Baylee Boehr (가비 베일리 보어)) (가비)	15	7	12	Average	0/4 stars	6	Visual	12	15	15	
STARON Entertainment (스타온 엔터테인먼트)	Yuri (ユリ) / (유리)	19	68	36	High	0/4 stars	23	Performance	16	16	16	
Individual Trainee (개인연습생)	Nizi (ニジ) / (니지)	14	74	66	High	1/4 stars	19	Performance	17	Eliminated	17	
Starting House Entertainment (스타팅하우스)	Kim Su-jin (김수진)	14	39	56	High	1/4 stars	16	Vocal	18	Eliminated	18	
Jellyfish Entertainment (젤리피쉬)	Goo Gyo-ryeon (구교련)	18	48	27	Average	1/4 stars	17	Performance	19	Eliminated	19	
Individual Trainee (개인연습생)	Bae Ye-ram (배예람)	16	58	29	High	1/4 stars	13	Performance	20	Eliminated	20	
STARON Entertainment (스타온 엔터테인먼트)	Lee Hu-ran (이후란)	18	59	25	High	0/4 stars	24	Vocal	21	Eliminated	21	
Individual Trainee (개인연습생)	Jayla (ジェイラ) / (제이라)	18	43	51	Average	0/4 stars	20	Performance	22	Eliminated	22	
GOLDDUST Entertainment (골드더스트 엔터테인먼트)	Yona (Note: Full Name: Chen Yujie (陈羽洁) / (첸유지에)) (요나)	25	63	14	Low	0/4 stars	14	Visual	Out	Eliminated	23	
STARON Entertainment (스타온 엔터테인먼트)	Kwon Eun-hyung (권은형)	17	17	3	Low	0/4 stars	21	Visual	Out	Eliminated	24	
TR Entertainment (티알)	Heo Sun-bin (허선빈)	19	16	17	Low	0/4 stars	25	Eliminated			25	
Individual Trainee (개인연습생)	Lee Eun-chae (이은채)	13	46	46	High	0/4 stars	26	Eliminated			26	
Entertainment CUP (엔터테인먼트 컵)	Jang Su-a (장수아)	15	36	59	Low	0/4 stars	27	Eliminated			27	
Individual Trainee (개인연습생)	Minari (ミナリ) / (미나리)	18	29	23	Low	0/4 stars	28	Eliminated			28	
Modhaus (모드 하우스)	Idota Yui (井戸田ゆい) / (이도타 유이)	16	79	77	Low	0/4 stars	29	Eliminated			29	
Blade Music (블레이드 뮤직)	Kim Soo-bin (김수빈)	18	57	49	High	0/4 stars	30	Eliminated			30	
Blade Music (블레이드 뮤직)	Oh Da-eun (오다은)	22	15	13	High	0/4 stars	Eliminated				31	
Blade Music (블레이드 뮤직)	Lee Soo-vin (이수빈)	20	30	21	High	0/4 stars	Eliminated				32	
J Win Entertainment	Choi Hye-rin (최혜린)	21	27	4	Average	0/4 stars	Eliminated				33	
Individual Trainee (개인연습생)	Kwon Chae-won (권채원) (Note: Kwon Chaewon is a member of girl group DIA.)	25	2	15	Average	0/4 stars	Eliminated				34	
Individual Trainee (개인연습생)	Nako (ナコ) / (나코)	15	60	53	Average	0/4 stars	Eliminated				35	
Individual Trainee (개인연습생)	Vanesya (바네사) (Note: Full Name: Vanesya Vixel Agustin (바네사 빅셀 어거스틴))	16	3	1	Low	0/4 stars	Eliminated				36	
Individual Trainee (개인연습생)	Riel (리엘) (Note: Full Name: Nan Akari Shwe (난 아카리 쉐))	24	1	6	Low	0/4 stars	Eliminated				37	
Individual Trainee (개인연습생)	Park Ye-won (박예원) (Note: Park Yewon was a member of Hot Issue.)	20	24	16	Low	0/4 stars	Eliminated				38	
Individual Trainee (개인연습생)	Aya Natsumi (아야 나츠미)	19	10	28	Low	0/4 stars	Eliminated				39	
Individual Trainee (개인연습생)	Alyssa (알리사)	19	12	7		Eliminated					40	
Individual Trainee (개인연습생)	Natchayathorn (나차야손)	17	62	11		Eliminated					41	
Individual Trainee (개인연습생)	Vũ Linh Ðan (부린단) (Note: Vu Linh Dan was a contestant on the seventh season of The Voice Kids of Vietnam.)	17	4	30		Eliminated					42	
Individual Trainee (개인연습생)	Ahn Seung-bi (안승비)	14	33	31		Eliminated					43	
Mystic Story (미스틱스토리)	Kim Seo-yeon (김서연)	17	23	33		Eliminated					44	
Starting House Entertainment (스타팅하우스)	Yoon Soo-in (윤수인)	19	45	34		Eliminated					45	
Individual Trainee (개인연습생)	Kim Hyo-jin (김효진)	17	32	37		Eliminated					46	
Troy Entertainment	Enny (эни) / (애니)	20	20	38		Eliminated					47	
Jellyfish Entertainment (젤리피쉬)	Choi Sung-eun (최성은)	19	28	39		Eliminated					48	
Woollim Entertainment (울림엔터테인먼트)	Kim So-yul (김소율)	18	21	40		Eliminated					49	
Individual Trainee (개인연습생)	Choi Yeo-jin (최여진)	13	50	41		Eliminated					50	
Individual Trainee (개인연습생)	Anxin (Note: Full Name: Anxin Mier (安心米儿) / (안신마이어)) (安心) / (안씬)	14	14	42		Eliminated					51	
Marbling E&M (마블링이엔엠)	Jeon Ji-eun (전지은) (Note: Jeon Jieun is a member of girl group Busters.)	19	42	43		Eliminated					52	
Individual Trainee (개인연습생)	Kim Chae-a (김채아)	13	37	44		Eliminated					53	
Woollim Entertainment (울림엔터테인먼트)	Lee Su-an (이수안)	16	51	45		Eliminated					54	
Individual Trainee (개인연습생)	Oukikk (우키크) (Note: Full Name: Thitirat Ngamchicharoen (ฐิติรัตน์ งามชิเจริญ) / (티티랏 응암치차로엔))	18	67	47		Eliminated					55	
FNC Entertainment Japan (FNC 엔터테인먼트 재팬)	Yukino (ユキノ) / (유키노)	17	73	48		Eliminated					56	
Individual Trainee (개인연습생)	Xiaoyu (Note: Full Name: Zhou Xiaoyu (周小榆) / (저우샤오유)) (小榆) / (샤오위)	23	54	50		Eliminated					57	
Individual Trainee (개인연습생)	Pia (ピア) / (피아)	18	44	52		Eliminated					58	
Individual Trainee (개인연습생)	Yuriko Yamaguchi (山口百合子) / (야마구치 유리코)	18	47	54		Eliminated					59	
Individual Trainee (개인연습생)	Kim Hye-mi (김혜미)	21	55	55		Eliminated					60	
Individual Trainee (개인연습생)	Kim Yu-ri (김유리)	16	41	58		Eliminated					61	
Individual Trainee (개인연습생)	Laura (로라)	18	65	60		Eliminated					62	
Individual Trainee (개인연습생)	Jessica (제시카)	16	61	61		Eliminated					63	
GGA	May (메이) (Note: Full Name: Nattha Phapirom (ณัฏฐา ภาภิรมย์) / (나타 파피롬)) (Note: May was a 2nd Generation candidate for the Thai girl group BNK48 under the name: Aomthong (아옴통))	22	26	62		Eliminated					64	
Individual Trainee (개인연습생)	Jung Ji-won (정지원)	18	56	63		Eliminated					65	
Individual Trainee (개인연습생)	Yuriko Honma (本間ゆりこ) / (혼마 유리코)	17	64	64		Eliminated					66	
Individual Trainee (개인연습생)	Yang Eugene (양유진)	15	82	65		Eliminated					67	
TNK Entertainment (TNK 엔터테인먼트)	Lee Jin-e (이진이)	20	40	67		Eliminated					68	
Individual Trainee (개인연습생)	Jang Min-ju (장민주) (Note: Jang Minju was a member of MAJORS under the stage name Aki.)	23	25	68		Eliminated					69	
Individual Trainee (개인연습생)	Kim Chae-won (김채원)	17	38	69		Eliminated					70	
Individual Trainee (개인연습생)	Cho Min-seo (조민서)	15	52	70		Eliminated					71	
Top Class Entertainment (TOP CLASS 娱乐)	Zhou Jiaqi (周嘉琪) / (저우지아치)	18	72	71		Eliminated					72	
Individual Trainee (개인연습생)	Kwon Yejin (권예진)	18	69	72		Eliminated					73	
YG Plus (YG 플러스)	Jeong Huigyeong (정희경)	18	77	73		Eliminated					74	
Individual Trainee (개인연습생)	Cho Chae-young (조채영)	18	70	74		Eliminated					75	
Individual Trainee (개인연습생)	Mila (ミラ) / (미라)	14	35	75		Eliminated					76	
Individual Trainee (개인연습생)	Yu (유우) (Note: Full Name: Kawasaki Yu (川崎優) / (가와사키 유우))	16	80	76		Eliminated					77	
GGA	Noh Yeon-woo (노연우)	18	34	78		Eliminated					78	
Woollim Entertainment (울림엔터테인먼트)	Park Ye-hyeon (박예현)	15	66	79		Eliminated					79	
Woollim Entertainment (울림엔터테인먼트)	Yoo Ye-na (유예나) (Note: Yoo Yena was a member of Cookie, Dream Candy, and LUNA KIDS.)	15	75	80		Eliminated					80	
Individual Trainee (개인연습생)	Izumi (いずみ) / (이즈미)	16	81	81		Eliminated					81	
Biscuit Entertainment	Jang Su-bin (장수빈)	18	76	82		Eliminated					82	
