= Universe Ticket =

2023–2024 South Korean reality competition series

- Promotional poster
- Hangul: 유니버스 티켓
- RR: Yunibeoseu tiket
- MR: Yunibŏsŭ t'ik'et
- Genre: Reality competition
- Created by: SBS
- Directed by: Lee Hwan-jin; Kim Hae-gyo; Yoo Hwa; Lee Byung-hee; Seo Yoon-mi; Jeong Min-ji; Do Yoo-jin; Jo Sung-bin; Eom Ha-eun; Kang Joo-hee
- Music by: Kwon Tae-eun
- Opening theme: "Universe" by Universe Ticket contestants
- Country of origin: South Korea
- Original language: Korean
- No. of episodes: 10

Production
- Running time: 90 minutes
- Production companies: SBS; F&F Entertainment; Formatist; UCC

Original release
- Network: SBS TV
- Release: November 18, 2023 – January 17, 2024

Related
- Universe League (2024–2025)

Universe Ticket (Korean: 유니버스 티켓) is a 2023–2024 South Korean reality competition show created by SBS. It was intended to form an eight-member girl group with a contract of 2 years and 6 months. The final group, UNIS, debuted under F&F Entertainment, a newly established entertainment company related to the clothing brand of the same name, F&F. The show aired on SBS TV from November 18, 2023, to January 17, 2024, every Friday at 18:00 (KST) for the first episode, then changed to 17:00 (KST) time slot for the second episode, before it changed to Wednesday (December 6) at 22:40 (KST) onwards.

A second season named Universe League features an all male contestants with a different format that aired starting November 2024.

== Production ==
=== Conception and development ===
Universe Ticket is a South Korean reality television show that features 82 contestants competing for a chance to debut in a global K-pop girl group. The program includes a series of missions and evaluations designed to assess the participants' singing, dancing, and overall performance abilities. The competition will ultimately result in the selection of eight final members, who will form a project-based girl group aimed at promoting to a global audience. The group will be active under a contract of 2 years and 6 months. The group formed through the show will carry out activities in both the real world and the metaverse, incorporating virtual content and digital fan interactions as part of their official promotions. This dual concept reflects the increasing integration of technology and entertainment within the K-pop industry. The first teaser for the show was released on March 2, 2023. Further details about the format, mentors, and broadcast schedule were gradually revealed leading up to the show's official premiere.

=== Casting ===
In January 2023, it was initially announced that the show would feature trainees between the ages of 10 and 19. However, when the official audition recruitment began in March 2023, the eligibility criteria were adjusted to allow any girls born before 2011 to apply. The application period for auditions ran from March 2 to May 14, 2023. After the application phase closed, successful applicants were individually notified between June 1 and June 10, 2023.

The profiles of the selected 82 contestants were introduced to the public through teaser videos released in two batches, on July 13 and July 17, 2023. These teasers served as an initial presentation to help viewers begin to familiarize themselves with the participants through their visuals, allowing fans to form early impressions of the participants ahead of the show's premiere.

On August 21, 2023, it was officially announced that several well-known K-pop artists would join the program as mentors. These included Kim Se-jeong, a former member of I.O.I and Gugudan; Hyoyeon of Girls' Generation; Yeji and Chaeryeong of Itzy; and solo artists Younha and Adora. Their involvement was confirmed ahead of the show's premiere as part of the main mentorship lineup.

During the show, the mentors were assigned specific roles based on their areas of expertise. Kim Se-jeong, Younha, and Adora served as vocal judges, while Rian of dance crew LaChica joined as the dance judge. Hyoyeon took on the role of rap judge. Yeji and Chaeryeong participated as celebrity mentors, offering general guidance and support to the contestants. Additionally, Jang Sung-kyu appeared as the emcee during Episode 10.

=== Competition format and voting ===
The show centers on 82 contestants competing in a series of missions for the opportunity to debut in a global K-pop girl group. Eight finalists are ultimately selected to form a project group aimed at international audiences, with activities conducted both in the real world and the metaverse. The competition begins with Battle Week, where contestants engage in a 1-on-1 battle using their audition songs. Higher-ranked contestants (1st–41st) choose opponents from the lower half (42nd–82nd), with performances evaluated on vocal ability, dance precision, and stage presence. A Revenge Battle follows, offering a second chance through team-based competition between "Winners" and "Challengers," with only four members receiving a Unicorn Pass for advancement. The next phase, Universe: Road to PRISM, includes a Level Test and Level Station, categorizing contestants into "High," "Average," and "Low" groups, each with differing advancement odds. High-ranked contestants perform original songs, while others perform covers, and compete within their tiers. For the next round, two stages were introduced in the Unit Station: the Position Unit and the New Song Unit. In Position Unit, participants choose between "Vocal," "Visual," and "Performance" units based on their strengths, with standout contestants earning Unicorn Tickets. In New Song Unit, participants are grouped to perform original songs, with eliminations based on votes from producers, judges, and fellow contestants. Those receiving two or more elimination votes are removed, while those with one vote undergo a 1-on-1 battle to determine their fate. The final phase, Final Station, involves performances under two concepts, "Dream" and "Prism," where judges award final Unicorn Tickets. The show concludes with the selection of the final lineup through a combination of fan votes and Unicorn Ticketing, leading to the debut of the eight-member girl group Unis.

== Cast ==
- Unicorns (Judges):
  - Kim Se-jeong (All-Rounder Unicorn, Vocal Mentor)
  - Younha (Artist Unicorn, Vocal Mentor)
  - Adora (Artist Unicorn, Vocal Mentor)
  - Rian (Performance Unicorn, Dance Mentor)
  - Hyoyeon (Girl Group Unicorn, Rap Mentor)
- Celebrity Unicorns:
  - Chaeryeong & Yeji (Wannabe Unicorn, MCs: Ep. 1-2, Special Trainers: Ep. 2-3)

== Contestants ==
The spelling of names in English is according to the official website. The Korean contestants are presented in Eastern order (family name, given name).

Color Key:

Final member of Unis
Contestants eliminated in the final elimination round (Episode 10)
Contestants eliminated in the fourth elimination round (Episode 9)
Contestants eliminated in the third elimination round (Episode 7)
Contestants eliminated in the second elimination round (Episode 5/6)
Contestants eliminated in the first elimination round (Episode 4)
Contestants that left the show

82 contestants
Elisia (엘리시아)	Bang Yun-ha (방윤하)	Nana (ナナ)	Gehlee Dangca (젤리 당카)	Lim Seo-won (임서원)
Jin Hyeon-ju (진현주)	Oh Yoon-a (오윤아)	Kotoko (琴子)	Hwang Si-eun (황시은)	Lee Sun-woo (이선우)
Bae Ha-ram (배하람)	Kim Su-min (김수민)	Jeon Jin-yeong (전진영)	Narumi (なるみ)	Gabi (가비)
Yuri (ユリ)	Nizi (ニジ)	Kim Su-jin (김수진)	Goo Gyo-ryeon (구교련)	Bae Ye-ram (배예람)
Lee Hu-ran (이후란)	Jayla (ジェイラ)	Yona (요나)	Kwon Eun-hyung (권은형)	Heo Sun-bin (허선빈)
Lee Eun-chae (이은채)	Jang Sua (장수아)	Minari (ミナリ)	Idota Yui (井戸田ゆい)	Kim Soo-bin (김수빈)
Oh Da-eun (오다연)	Lee Soo-vin (이수빈)	Choi Hye-rin (최혜린)	Kwon Chae-won (권채원)	Nako (ナコ)
Vanesya (바네사)	Riel (리엘)	Park Ye-won (박예원)	Aya Natsumi (아야나츠미)	Alyssa (알리사)
Natchayathorn (나차야손)	Vu Linh Dan (Vũ Linh Đan)	Ahn Seung-bi (안승비)	Kim Seo-yeon (김서연)	Yoon Soo-in (윤수인)
Kim Hyo-jin (김효진)	Enny (애니; эни)	Choi Sung-eun (최성은)	Kim So-yul (김소율)	Choi Yeo-jin (최여진)
Anxin (安心)	Jeon Ji-eun (전지은)	Kim Chae-a (김채아)	Lee Su-an (이수안)	Oukikk (우키크)
Yukino (ユキノ)	Xiaoyu (小榆)	Pia (ピア)	Yamaguchi Yuriko (山口百合子)	Kim Hye-mi (김혜미)
Kim Yu-ri (김유리)	Laura (로라)	Jessica (제시카)	May (메이)	Jung Ji-won (정지원)
Honma Yuriko (本間ゆりこ)	Yang Eugene (양유진)	Lee Jin-e (이진이)	Jang Min-ju (장민주)	Kim Chae-won (김채원)
Cho Min-seo (조민서)	Zhou Jiaqi (周嘉琪)	Kwon Ye-jin (권예진)	Jeong Hui-gyeong (정희경)	Cho Chae-young (조채영)
Mila (ミラ)	Yu (ユウ)	Noh Yeon-woo (노연우)	Park Ye-hyeon (박예현)	Yoo Ye-na (유예나)
Izumi (いずみ)	Jang Su-bin (장수빈)			

== Episodes ==
No.	Title	Original release date	Average audience share (Nielsen Korea)
1	"Episode.01: Beginning" (Korean: Episode.01: 시작)	November 18, 2023	1.1%
Universe Ticket is a reality competition where 82 young women showcase their talents to achieve their dreams of stardom. The journey begins with the revelation of rankings based on pre-show voting, setting the stage for intense competition. Next comes Battle Week, where the top 41 contestants select their opponents from those ranked 42-82. In high-stakes one-on-one battles, they showcase their vocal, dance, and performance skills to prove they deserve to stay. With only half of the contestants advancing, emotions run high as eliminations take place. Those who survive must continue refining their talents, striving for a coveted spot in the final lineup.
2	"Episode.02: Revenge" (Korean: Episode.02: 복수)	November 25, 2023	0.9%
As "Battle Week" progresses, contestants are filled with both excitement and nervousness, knowing that each performance could determine their fate. Once the battle week concludes, the competition intensifies with the start of the "Revenge Battle." In this round, the contestants are split into two groups: the "Winners" and the "Challengers". Both groups are tasked with performing songs based on five different concepts: "Cute", "Enchanting", "Pure", "Sparkling", and "Charismatic". The teams will showcase their abilities by embodying these concepts, and the group with the best performance will win. The winning team will be rewarded with a chance to move on to the next round, but only four members will earn a direct pass to continue. The remaining contestants, both from the winning and losing teams, must rely on the votes to secure their spot in the next phase of the competition.
3	"Episode.03: Tears" (Korean: Episode.03: 눈물)	December 2, 2023	0.7%
The "Revenge Battle" continues, pushing contestants to give their all as they fight to secure victory for their team. With the stakes higher than ever, each participant is fully dedicated to perfecting their performances, refining their vocals, mastering choreography, and embodying their assigned concept. As the competition heats up, emotions run high—some contestants feel the pressure mounting, while others draw strength from their determination to prove themselves. With every rehearsal and performance, they push their limits, knowing that only the best will earn a direct pass to the next round. Each moment on stage is a crucial opportunity to impress both the judges and the audience, making every decision, every movement, and every note count.
4	"Episode.04: Ticket" (Korean: Episode.04: 티켓)	December 6, 2023	0.8%
Following the intense "Revenge Battle", a total of 39 contestants successfully advance to the next stage of the competition. With the stakes growing even higher, the next phase, "Universe: Road to Prism", is officially introduced. In this stage, contestants must climb through five hierarchical levels within PRISM, each representing a step closer to their ultimate goal. Every contestant begins at the same starting level, "M," but their rankings will shift based on their performances and the points they accumulate throughout the competition. Only 8 contestants who advance to the "P" level will earn PRISM tickets and make their debut. As they progress, their skills, stage presence, and determination will be tested more than ever, pushing them to prove that they deserve to reach the top.
5	"Episode.05: Competition" (Korean: Episode.05: 경쟁)	December 13, 2023	0.5%
The journey through "Universe: Road to PRISM" officially begins with its first major challenge, the "Level Station". In this stage, the contestants are evaluated individually and categorized into three ranks based on their overall skills and performance: "High", "Average", and "Low". Each ranking tier comes with different opportunities for advancement as well as risks of elimination. Contestants placed in the "High" category will see four members promoted to the next level, while two will face elimination. In the "Average" group, three contestants will be promoted, but an equal number of three will be eliminated. Meanwhile, those in the "Low" category face the greatest challenge, as only two will advance while four will be eliminated. To determine who will be promoted and who will be eliminated, each rank is further divided into two groups that will compete against each other. This additional layer of competition makes the stakes even higher, as contestants must outperform their direct competitors to secure their place in the next stage. With the number of promotions and eliminations varying across ranks, contestants must give their best performance to secure their spot in the competition. As the pressure intensifies, each decision and showcase becomes even more critical in determining their future on the Universe Ticket stage.
6	"Episode.06: Growth" (Korean: Episode.06: 성장)	December 20, 2023	0.7%
The "Level Station" continues, and the competition grows even more intense. Contestants push themselves to the limit, determined to avoid elimination and secure their place in the next round. The pressure takes an emotional toll, and tears are shed as some face the stress of proving themselves while others struggle with uncertainty about their future in the show. The atmosphere is charged with tension, as every contestant knows that their fate hangs in the balance.
7	"Episode.07: Promotion or Elimination" (Korean: Episode.07: 승급 혹은 탈락)	December 27, 2023	0.6%
After the "Level Station" concludes, it's time to place the contestants into their respective hierarchies within "Universe: Road to PRISM". The "Promotion Ceremony" introduces three distinct methods by which contestants can be promoted to higher ranks, each offering a different path to advancement. The first method is the "Unicorn Ticket", a highly coveted pass granted by the judges. This ticket is awarded to the contestants whose performances stand out the most, impressing the judges and earning them a direct promotion to the next level. The second method is "Fan Ticketing", where the power shifts to the fans. Based on their votes, fans can propel their favorite contestants forward, giving them a chance to move up the ranks. Finally, there's the hidden "Candy Ticketing", a secret form of promotion that comes from the contestants themselves. This unique ticket allows fellow participants to vote for the contestants based on the given questions. However, for those who fail to secure promotion through any of these methods and remain stuck in rank "M," the consequences are harsh. These contestants will be eliminated from the competition, marking the end of their journey on Universe Ticket. With the pressure to advance mounting, every contestant must strive to secure their place in the next phase or face the risk of being sent home.
8	"Episode.08: Rival" (Korean: Episode.08: 라이벌)	January 3, 2024	0.7%
After the "Level Station", the competition moves into the next phase: the "Unit Station". This stage consists of two parts: the "Position Unit" and the "New Song Unit". The episode kicks off with the "Position Unit", where contestants are given the opportunity to choose their respective units based on their strengths and skills. The available units are "Vocal", "Visual", and "Performance", each focusing on different aspects of a contestant's talent. Contestants must carefully select the unit that best aligns with their abilities, as this decision will play a crucial role in their journey forward in the competition. Throughout this process, the judges will be observing closely and awarding "Unicorn Tickets" to contestants who stand out the most in their performances, granting them direct advancement and recognition for their exceptional skills.
9	"Episode.09: Debut D-7" (Korean: Episode.09: 데뷔 D-7)	January 10, 2024	0.7%
Right after the "Position Unit", the final part of the "Unit Station" begins, marking the last performance before the highly anticipated "Final Station" of "Universe: Road to PRISM". In this stage, the contestants are divided into two groups, each given a new song composed specifically for the show. These songs provide a fresh challenge, allowing the contestants to showcase their versatility and growth throughout the competition. The elimination process is unique, as it involves a vote from the producers, judges, and the contestants themselves. If a contestant receives two or more elimination votes, they are immediately eliminated from the competition. However, if they receive just one vote, along with other candidates, they will enter a one-on-one battle to determine who will be sent home. At the end of this intense round, the promotion ceremony takes place, determining which contestants will move on to the next stage and ultimately become finalists. This marks a crucial turning point in the competition, as the remaining contestants fight to secure their spot in the grand finale.
10	"Episode.10: D-day"	January 17, 2024	0.6%
The "Final Station" of "Universe: Road to PRISM" begins, bringing the competition to its thrilling climax. In this stage, there are two key concepts: "Dream" and "Prism", with the contestants split into two groups, each performing for one of these themes. The performances will be judged closely, with the judges awarding "Unicorn Tickets" to the standout performers who impress the most, granting them a direct promotion to the next level. After the performances, the most exceptional contestants will be chosen to form the final debut group, named "Unis", short for "U&I Story" and "Universe is Started." This group will represent the culmination of all the hard work and talent showcased throughout the competition, marking the ultimate achievement for the remaining contestants.

== Rankings ==
=== Overall Ranking ===
Rankings in each round are based exclusively on online voting, with contestant placements determined by fan support.

Color key:

New Top 8 (Note: Indicates contestants who had never placed in the Top 8 in any prior elimination rounds or ranking announcements.)

#	Ep. 1 (Note: Pre-Voting Period: Jul 19 – Aug 9)	Ep. 4 (Note: First Voting Period: Sep 9 – Oct 10)		Ep. 7 (Note: Second Voting Period: Nov 18 – Dec 5)		Ep. 9 (Note: Third Voting Period: Dec 28 – Jan 6)		Ep. 10 (Note: Third Voting Period: Jan 11 – Jan 17)	
#	Contestant	Contestant	Voting Points	Contestant	Voting Points	Contestant	Voting Points	Contestant	Voting Points
1	Elisia	Vu Linh Dan	12,593.9	Elisia	228,503.7	Elisia	553,483.4	Elisia	—
2	Bae Haram	Choi Hyerin	5,583.6	Gehlee Dangca	204,903.1	Gehlee Dangca	518,852.4	Gehlee Dangca	1,705,770
3	Hwang Sieun	Kim Sumin	3,753.0	Lim Seo-won	172,272.2	Oh Yoon-a	140,747.0	Jin Hyeon-ju	305,215.8
4	Vu Linh Dan	Nana	3,689.9	Oh Yoon-a	139,734.5	Jin Hyeon-ju	111,800.9	Hwang Si-eun	273,287.1
5	Bae Yeram	Elisia	3,499.8	Nana	121,707.2	Bang Yunha	91,723.4	Oh Yoon-a	252,482.5
6	Heo Sunbin	Riel	3,393.9	Jin Hyeon-ju	113,915.0	Jeon Jin-yeong	89,763.7	Yuri	251,957.5
7	Narumi	Gehlee Dangca	2,739.6	Bang Yun-ha	113,135.2	Yuri	84,794.6	Lim Seo-won	231,159.5
8	Jin Hyeon-ju	Oh Yoon-a	2,497.5	Kotoko	112,835.0	Lim Seo-won	78,783.2	Bang Yun-ha	200,906.3

=== Prism Level Ranking ===
The overall rankings are determined by accumulated points, which include Unicorn Ticketing and Hidden Ticketing, influencing contestant advancement.

Color key

- New Top 8 (Note: Indicates contestants who had never placed in the Top 8 in any prior elimination rounds or ranking announcements.)
- Unicorn Ticketing (Note: Indicates contestants who get bonus points from judges.)
- Producer Ticketing (Note: Indicates contestants who get bonus points from hidden evaluation.)
- Unicorn and Hidden Ticketing (Note: Indicates contestants who get bonus points from judges and hidden evaluation at the same time.)

#	Ep. 7 (Note: Second Voting Period: Nov 18 – Dec 5)			Ep. 9 (Note: Second Voting Period: Dec 28 – Jan 6)			Ep. 10 (Note: Final Voting Period: Jan 11 – Jan 17)		
#	Contestant	Points (Note: Online Voting (30% from Web + 70% from Fancast App) + Judges Bonus (35000 Points) + Contestants Evaluation Bonus (115000 Points).)	Level	Contestant	Points	Level	Contestant	Voting Points	Level
1	Nana	271,707.2	R	Elisia	781,987.1	P	Elisia	PRISM Ticketing	P
2	Gehlee Dangca	239,903.1	I	Gehlee Dangca	758,755.5	R	Bang Yun-ha	960,906 (Note: This Unicorn Ticketing selected by Sejeong.)	P
3	Elisia	228,503.7	I	Lim Seo-won	328,783.2	R	Nana	917,941 (Note: This Unicorn Ticketing selected by Younha.)	P
4	Lim Seo-won	172,272.2	I	Nana	326,948.9	R	Gehlee Dangca	2,464,526	P
5	Bang Yun-ha	148,135.2	S	Oh Yoon-a	220,222.8	R	Lim Seo-won	559,943	P
6	Gabi	139,734.5	S	Kotoko	218,019.9	R	Jin Hyeon-ju	496,797	P
7	Lee Sun-woo	113,915	S	Bang Yun-ha	217,703.1	R	Oh Yoon-a	472,180	P
8	Kotoko	112,835	S	Kim Su-min	208,870	R	Kotoko	470,502	P

=== Final Prism Ticketing & Fan Ticketing Ranking ===
The points accumulated are based on Fan Ticketing from the first voting period up until the last. However, this total does not include the Unicorn Ticket that contestants may have received during the competition.

#	Ep. 10 (Note: Final Voting Period: Jan 11 – Jan 17)	
#	Contestant	Voting Points
1	Elisia	PRISM Ticketing
2	Gehlee Dangca	2,464,526
3	Lim Seo-won	559,943
4	Jin Hyeon-ju	496,797
5	Nana	484,889
6	Oh Yoon-a	472,180
7	Kotoko	470,502
8	Bang Yunha	434,275

== Discography ==
The theme song "Come With Me? (Universe)" was recorded and performed by the contestants. It was released on October 8, 2023, on digital music platforms.

=== Singles ===
List of singles, with selected chart positions
Title	Year	Peak chart positions	Album
Title	Year	KOR	Album
"Come With Me? (Universe)" (같이 갈래? (Universe))	2023	—	Universe Ticket - Come With Me?
"Come With Me? (Universe) Instrumental" (같이 갈래?)	2023	—	Universe Ticket - Come With Me?
"Ticket To You"	2023	—	Universe Ticket - Ticket To You
"Ticket To You (Inst.)"	2023	—	Universe Ticket - Ticket To You
"Rush Hour"	2023	—	Universe Ticket - Level Station
"Whateva"	2023	—	Universe Ticket - Level Station
"Yummy Yum"	2024	—	Universe Ticket - Unit Station
"Dream of Girls" (꿈의 소녀)	2024	—	Universe Ticket - Unit Station
"Loco"	2024	—	Universe Ticket - Unit Station
"Beautiful"	2024	—	Universe Ticket - Unit Station
"Catallena" (까탈레나)	2024	—	Universe Ticket - Unit Station
"Camera"	2024	—	Universe Ticket - Final Station
"Dopamine"	2024	—	Universe Ticket - Final Station
"White"	2024	—	Universe Ticket - Final Station
"Miracle"	2024	—	Universe Ticket - Final Station
"—" denotes releases that did not chart or were not released in that territory.

== Reception ==
=== Viewership ratings ===
According to Nielsen Korea, Universe Ticket maintained an average nationwide viewership rating of 0.5% throughout its broadcast from November 2023 to January 2024. The show's highest-rated episode reached 1.1%, while the lowest dropped to 0.5%. Its final episode, aired on January 17, 2024, also recorded a 0.5% rating. Overall, the program experienced limited domestic viewership during its run.

=== Business impact ===
The program was produced by F&F Entertainment in collaboration with SBS and marks F&F's first major venture into the K-pop entertainment sector. According to media reports, F&F invested over ₩10 billion to produce Universe Ticket alone, underscoring a significant commitment given that the company's initial capital was only ₩2 billion. This level of investment was aligned with F&F's broader strategy to diversify beyond fashion—leveraging its entertainment subsidiary to create cross-promotional synergies between its clothing business and the newly formed girl group, Unis. Industry insiders note that despite low domestic ratings, the show generated international engagement and provided brand exposure across multiple markets. This emphasis on long-term return aligns with the broader trend of K-pop survival programs, where initial losses are often recovered through global fandom, merchandise, and extended content strategies .

== Post-Competition ==
The final group, Unis is set to be active for 2 1/2 years and is managed by F&F Entertainment. The group debuted on March 27, 2024, with their mini album We Unis.

Other contestants
- Some contestants returned to their original groups:
  - Jeon Ji-eun (52nd) returned to Busters.
    - She left the group on March 20, 2025.
- Some contestants left their companies or joined new ones:
  - Kim Su-min (12th), Kim Soo-bin (30th), and Lee Soo-vin (32nd) all left Blade Music.
    - Kim Soo-bin joined Big Ocean ENM.
    - Lee Soo-vin joined Big Mountain Entertainment.
  - Jeon Jin-yeong (13th) and Choi Hye-rin (32nd) both left J Win Entertainment.
    - Jeon Jin-yeong joined Big Mountain Entertainment.
  - Yuri (16th) and Lee Hu-ran (21st) both left STARON Entertainment.
    - Yuri joined Across Entertainment.
    - Lee Hu-ran joined Big Ocean ENM, but later left the company after her exclusive contract was terminated on April 3, 2026.
  - Kim Su-jin (18th) and Yoon Soo-in (45th) both left Starting House Entertainment.
    - Yoon Soo-in joined Blue Brown Records.
  - Goo Gyo-ryeon (19th) and Choi Sung-eun (48th) both left Jellyfish Entertainment.
  - Yona (23rd) left GOLDDUST Entertainment and joined CNS Entertainment.
  - Heo Sun-bin (25th) left TR Entertainment.
  - Jang Su-a (27th) left Entertainment CUP.
  - Idota Yui (29th) left Modhaus.
  - Kwon Chae-won (34th) signed with acting agency Started Entertainment.
  - Vanesya (36th) joined Na Entertainment.
  - Riel (37th) joined DSP Media.
  - Aya Natsumi (39th) joined TryCrew Entertainment.
    - She later left the company to focus on her academic pursuits.
  - Vũ Linh Ðan (42nd) joined DAO Labels.
  - Ahn Seung-bi (43rd) joined Monster Brain.
  - Kim Seo-yeon (44th) left Mystic Story.
  - Kim So-yul (49th), Lee Su-an (54th), Park Ye-hyeon (79th), and Yoo Ye-na (80th) all left Woollim Entertainment.
  - Jeon Ji-eun (52nd) left Marbling E&M on March 20, 2025.
  - Oukikk (55th) joined BRIQ Entertainment.
    - She later quietly left the company after their girl group plans fell through.
  - Yukino (56th) has seemingly left FNC Entertainment Japan, after her old group, Prikil was removed from the company's website.
  - Pia (58th) joined O21.
  - May (64th) and Noh Yeon-woo (78th) both left GGA.
    - May joined Big Ocean ENM, but later left in the second half of 2024.
  - Kim Chae-won (70th) joined Modhaus.
  - Kwon Ye-jin (73rd) joined SW Entertainment.
  - Jang Su-bin (82nd) left Biscuit Entertainment.
- Some contestants will debut or debuted in new girl groups or released music as solo artists:
  - Jeon Jin-yeong (13th) and Lee Soo-vin (32nd) were revealed to be added to the lineup of Big Mountain Entertainment's debuted girl group, Queenz Eye on July 8 and 7, 2025, respectively. They debuted, under the stage names Jinyul and Seovin, respectively, as members of Queenz Eye with their first mini album Prism Ep.01 with the title track 'Feel the Vibe' on August 7, 2025.
  - Yuri (16th) debuted as a member of Across Entertainment's new Japanese girl group ALETTA with their first digital single Natsumeku Kissing You on May 15, 2025.
  - Yona (23rd) was seemingly slated to debut as a member of CNS Entertainment's new girl group, I-CODE sometime in 2026, but she seems to have quietly left the company.
  - Vanesya (36th) debuted as a member of Na Entertainment's new global girl group, NWH:I with their first digital single Like a Flame on October 24, 2025.
  - Riel (37th) was revealed to be added to the lineup of DSP Media's debuted girl group, Gavy NJ on August 20, 2025. She debuted as a member of Gavy NJ with their first extended play (EP) The Gavy NJ with the title track 'Happiness' on September 10, 2025.
  - Aya Natsumi (39th), under the stage name Vivi, debuted as a member of TryCrew Entertainment's new Japanese girl group BENNY with their first digital single WOAH on February 22, 2025.
    - She left the group and the agency to focus on her academic pursuits on January 23, 2026.
  - Vũ Linh Ðan (42nd), under the stage name Linh Dan, debuted as a soloist with her first EP Sống Trong Tình Yêu on December 18, 2025.
  - Ahn Seung-bi (43rd) debuted as a member of Monster Brain's new girl group, S2IT with their first digital single What I Want on March 14, 2026.
  - Yoon Soo-in (45th), under the stage name Chaei, debuted as a member of Blue Brown Records' new girl group, Heart Of Woman with their first album Heart Byte: LEGACY with the title track 'Lost In Proof' on May 28, 2026.
  - Enny (47th) debuted as a member of Troy Entertainment's new girl group, NAVILLERA with their first digital single No Limit on February 3, 2026.
  - Pia (58th) debuted as a member of O21's new Japanese girl group, Ettone with their first single U+U on September 10, 2025.
  - May (64th), under the stage name Evie, was a predebut member of Big Ocean ENM's upcoming girl group, iii but she left the group and the company before debut in the second half of 2024.
    - Lee Hu-ran (21st) and Kim Soo-bin (30th) were later revealed to be added to the lineup of iii on July 21 and 18, 2025, respectively. They debuted as members of iii with their first single album Re:al iii with the title track 'Forbidden Midnight' on August 29, 2025.
      - Lee Hu-ran left the group and the agency after the termination of her exclusive contract on April 3, 2026.
  - Lee Jin-e (68th), who already debuted as a soloist prior to the airing of the show, released her eighth digital single Just the two of us on January 1, 2024.
  - Kim Chae-won (70th) was revealed as TripleS' 21st member on April 1, 2024. She debuted as a member of TripleS with their first full-length album <Assemble24> with the title track 'Girls Never Die' on May 8, 2024, as well as a member of TripleS' eighth sub unit, Glow with the digital single Glow <Inner Dance> on June 21, 2024.
  - Kwon Ye-jin (73rd) debuted as a member of SW Entertainment's new girl group, UDTT with their first single album School Rush with the title track 'Really Really' on April 29, 2025.
- Some contestants participated in other survival shows:
  - Kim Su-jin (18th) and Yoon Soo-in (45th) participated in Mnet’s Korean rap survival show Unpretty Rapstar: HIP POP Princess. Yoon Soo-in was eliminated in the eighth episode, after ranking 22nd, and Kim Su-jin debuted as a member of the winning girl group Hiipe Princess under Chapter-I, after ranking 7th.
  - Jayla (22nd) participated in Hybe and Geffen Records' Japanese survival show World Scout: The Final Piece. She was eliminated in the fifth episode, after ranking 5th.
  - Yona (23rd) participated in global girl group survival show Stellar Sugar.
    - She was never officially eliminated from the show, as she was one of four contestants who were to be selected as the final two members of the debut group, who were never officially announced.
  - Yu (77th) participated in JYP Entertainment and KBS2's Korean survival show The Entertainer. She was seemingly set to debut as a member of the winning girl group DDDD 25 under INNIT Entertainment, after ranking in the show's top 5, but the plans for their debut seems to have been cancelled.
    - She would later be revealed as a member of INNIT Entertainment's upcoming girl group OURBIRTHDAY, under the stage name U.
