= Unis (group) =

South Korean girl group (2024–2026)

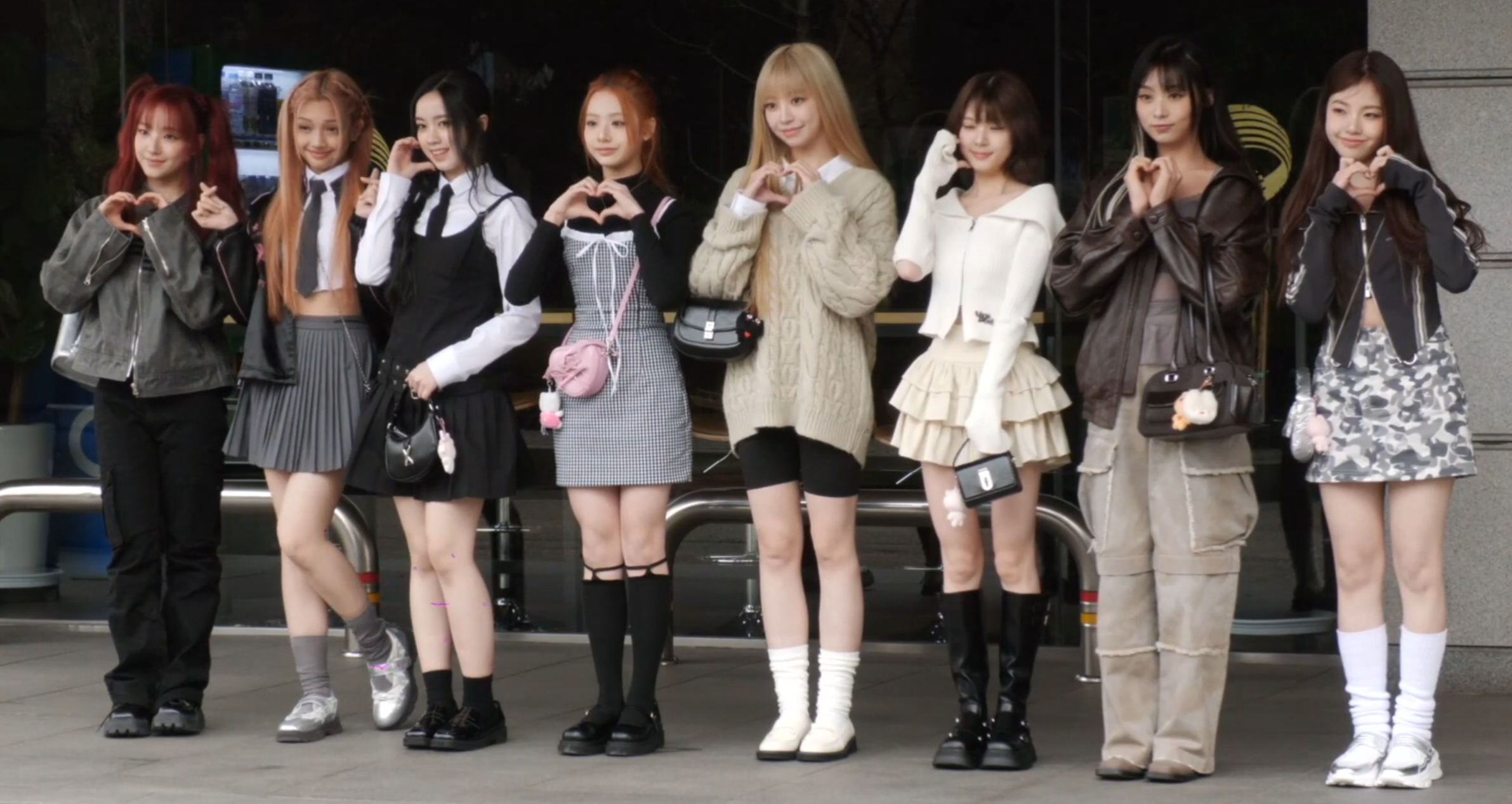
- Unis in March 2024; L–R: Yunha, Gehlee, Elisia, Seowon, Nana, Kotoko, Hyeonju, Yoona

Background information
- Origin: Seoul, South Korea
- Genre: K-pop
- Years active: 2024–2026
- Labels: F&F
- Past members: Hyeonju; Nana; Gehlee; Kotoko; Yunha; Elisia; Yoona; Seowon
- Website: Official website

Unis (Korean: 유니스; stylized in all caps or as U&iS) was a South Korean girl group formed and managed by F&F Entertainment through the survival reality show, Universe Ticket. The group consisted of Hyeonju, Nana, Gehlee, Kotoko, Yunha, Elisia, Yoona, and Seowon. They debuted on March 27, 2024, with the extended play (EP) We Unis. The group disbanded on September 26, 2026 following the end of their contract term.

== Name ==
Official logo

The group's name is derived as an abbreviation of "U&I Story", as well as "UNiverse Is Starting", which symbolizes the group's desire to continue writing its own story of achieving their dreams that began in Universe Ticket.

== History ==
=== Formation through Universe Ticket and pre-debut activities ===
Unis was formed through the SBS reality survival show Universe Ticket, which aired from November 18, 2023, to January 17, 2024. The show brought 82 contestants from around the world, primarily in South Korea, Japan, China, Thailand, Myanmar, Mongolia, Vietnam, France, USA, the Philippines, and Canada, to compete to debut in a multinational girl group.

Before appearing on the program, several members had already been active in the entertainment industry. In 2017, Hyeonju was a member of the girl group Good Day under the name Lucky and competed in The Unit: Idol Rebooting Project. However, she was eliminated in the third elimination round and redebuted in Cignature in 2020 under the name Belle. In 2019, Elisia was cast in a guest role on the Philippine television drama series Nang Ngumiti ang Langit. In December 2020, Seowon appeared as a contestant on the reality survival show Miss Trot 2. Sometime after the show, Seowon signed a contract with Lean Branding. and went onto make her official debut as a soloist on April 24, 2021, with the release of her first digital single, "Shoulder Dance". In March 2021, Yoona joined the music group and YouTube collective Play With Me Club formed by PocketTV, and graduated from the group on March 25, 2022. In October 2021, Nana competed in Who Is Princess?. She ranked fifth and made her debut as a member of a five-member girl group Prikil in May 2022.

=== 2024: Debut with We Unis and Curious ===
On January 18, 2024, it was reported that Unis will be debuting sometime in March. Later, it was announced that the group will be making their debut on March 27, 2024, with the extended play We Unis. On March 7, the group released a promotion scheduler for the album. On March 27, the group made their debut with the release of the EP We Unis, along with its lead single "Superwoman".

On July 12, it was announced that the group will release their first single album Curious on August 6. On July 14, the group released a promotion scheduler for the album. On August 6, the group made their comeback with the release of their first single album Curious, along with its lead single as the same name. On September 3, it was announced that the group will debut their first solo reality show Unibus Tour on September 24. On December 13, the group's single "Curious" was placed on "50 Best Songs of 2024" by Billboard Philippines.

=== 2025–2026: Swicy, Japanese releases, and disbandment ===
On March 6, 2025, it was reported that Unis would have a comeback sometime in April, 8 months after their previous comeback and followed by an Asian tour. Later, it was announced that the group would be making their comeback on April 15, 2025, with the extended play Swicy, and its lead single of the same name. On March 31, the group released a promotion scheduler for the album. On April 23, the group received their first music show win since debut with "Swicy", on the MBC M music program Show Champion. On May 7, F&F confirmed Unis would kick off their first fan-con Asia tour with a Seoul, South Korea concert at CG Art Hall on June 8, followed by shows in Japan in Tokyo and Osaka for June 15 and 20. On June 7, Unis released the special digital single "See you in my dream" as a surprise fan song to expresses gratitude to fans for their endless love and announces the beginning of a new journey together. On June 21, an additional fan-con in the Philippines was announced for September 9 at New Frontier Theater. On July 9, Unis released the digital single "Shaking My Head" with Japanese singer and songwriter noa through various online music sites. On August 28, Unis unveiled the cover art for their Japanese digital single "Moshi Moshi". On September 12, Unis released the first Japanese digital single "MoshiMoshi" with an English version on September 15. On December 17, Unis released the second Japanese digital single "Mwah...".

On January 9, 2026, F&F Entertainment confirmed Unis would hold a concert, 2026 Unis 1st Tour: Ever Last beginning in Philadelphia on January 30 and followed by shows in 14 other cities. On March 3, F&F Entertainment confirmed Unis would be holding a fan meeting, 2026 Unis Tokyo Fanmeeting Moshi Moshi This is Unis in Tokyo, Japan on March 29. On June 18, it was announced that UNIS would make their comeback on July 31, 2026, with their first Japanese mini album. On July 31, the group made their comeback with the release of the first Japanese EP Uni Sparkle!, along with its lead single "GimmeSummer". On September 8, the group released a remake of "Sky Land, Star Land", a hit song from the 90s by the duo B.B.

On September 22, F&F Entertainment announced the group would disband on September 26. On September 23, it was announced that members Elisia and Yunha recorded the title track "Wonderful Life" for the Korean drama Mission: Mompossible. On the same day, the group released their final single, "Milky Way", co-written by members Hyeonju, Nana, Elisia, and Yoona. The group officially disbanded on September 26 with their final music video for "Milky Way" released on the same day.

== Members ==
- Hyeonju (현주) – leader
- Nana (나나)
- Gehlee (젤리)
- Kotoko (코토코)
- Yunha (윤하)
- Elisia (엘리시아)
- Yoona (윤아)
- Seowon (서원)

== Discography ==
=== Extended plays ===
List of extended plays, with selected chart positions and sales
Title	Details	Peak chart positions		Sales
Title	Details	KOR	JPN	Sales
Korean
We Unis	Released: March 27, 2024; Label: F&F; Formats: CD, digital download, streaming; Track listing: 1. "Superwoman"; 2. "Butterfly's Dream"; 3. "Whatchu Need"; 4. "Dopamine (UNIS ver.)" 5. "Dream of Girls (UNIS ver.)"	11	—	KOR: 65,052
Swicy	Released: April 15, 2025; Label: F&F; Formats: CD, digital download, streaming; Track listing: 1. "From a seed called 'Hey, what's up?'" 2. "Swicy"; 3. "Ddang!"; 4. "Good Feeling"; 5. "Spring Rain"	3	—	KOR: 58,479
Japanese
UNI☆Sparkle!	Released: July 31, 2026; Label: F&F; Formats: CD, digital download, streaming; Track listing: 1. "GimmeSummer"; 2. "Bbybby"; 3. "MoshiMoshi"; 4. "Mwah..."; 5. "Swicy - Japanese ver."	—	13	JPN: 4,602

=== Single albums ===
List of single albums, with selected chart positions and sales
Title	Details	Peak chart positions	Sales
Title	Details	KOR	Sales
Curious	Released: August 6, 2024; Label: F&F; Formats: CD, digital download, streaming; Track listing: 1. "Curious"; 2. "Datin' Myself"; 3. "Poppin'"	5	KOR: 70,376

=== Singles ===
List of singles, showing year released, selected chart positions, and name of the album
Title	Year	Peak chart positions	Album
Title	Year	KOR DL	Album
Korean
"Superwoman"	2024	41	We Unis
"Curious" (너만 몰라)	2024	14	Curious
"Swicy"	2025	5	Swicy
"Sky Land, Star Land" (하늘땅 별땅)	2026	31	Non-album singles
"Milky Way"	2026	95	Non-album singles
Japanese
"MoshiMoshi" (もしもし)	2025	—	Uni Sparkle!
"Mwah..." (幸せになんかならないでね)	2025	—	Uni Sparkle!
"GimmeSummer" (ギミサマ⭐︎)	2026	—	Uni Sparkle!
"—" denotes releases that did not chart or were not released in that region.

=== Promotional singles ===
List of promotional singles, showing year released, and name of the album
Title	Year	Album
"See You in My Dream" (꿈에서 또 만나)	2025	Non-album single

=== Collaborative singles ===
List of collaborative singles, showing year released, and name of the album
Title	Year	Album
"Shaking My Head" (with Noa (乃紫)	2025	Non-album single

=== Other charted songs ===
List of other charted songs, showing year released, selected chart positions, and name of the album
Title	Year	Peak chart positions	Album
Title	Year	KOR DL	Album
"Butterfly's Dream"	2024	133	We Unis
"Whatchu Need"	2024	140	We Unis
"Dopamine" (Unis Ver.)	2024	49	We Unis
"Dream of Girls" (꿈의 소녀) (Unis Ver.)	2024	115	We Unis
"Datin' Myself"	2024	31	Curious
"Poppin"	2024	30	Curious
"From a Seed Called 'Hey, What's Up?'" ('뭐해?'라는 씨앗에서)	2025	113	Swicy
"Ddang!" (땡!)	2025	124	Swicy
"Good Feeling"	2025	129	Swicy
"Spring Rain" (봄비)	2025	111	Swicy

== Videography ==
=== Music videos ===
List of music videos, showing year released, and name of the director(s)
Title	Year	Director(s)	Ref.
"Superwoman"	2024	Bart, Seo Dong-hyeok (Flipevil)	
"Curious"	2024	Headhead (Ambience)	
"Swicy"	2025	Lee Ki-suk, Kim Do-yun (LayerZ)	
"MoshiMoshi"	2025	Lee Ki-suk, Kim Do-yun (LayerZ)	
"Mwah..."	2025	Lee Ki-suk, Kim Do-yun (LayerZ)	
"GimmeSummer"	2026	Makita Sako	
"Milky Way"	2026		

=== Other videos ===
Title	Year	Director(s)	Notes	Ref.
"Curious"	2024	—	Performance video	
"Swicy"	2025	—	Performance video	
"Spring Rain"	2025	—	Special clip	
"MoshiMoshi"	2025	—	Performance video	
"Mwah..."	2025	—	Performance video	
"Sky Land, Star Land"	2026	—	Performance video	

== Filmography ==
=== Reality shows ===
Reality shows appearances
Year	Title	Notes	Ref.
2023–24	Universe Ticket	Reality competition show that determined the members of Unis	
2024	Unibus Tour		

== Live performances ==
=== Concerts and tours ===
Date	City	Country	Venue	Performed song(s)	Ref.
1st Philippine Fancon: UNIS in Curiousland
October 25, 2024	Quezon City	Philippines	New Frontier Theater	"Superwoman"; "Dopamine"; "Poppin'"; "Datin' Myself"; "Pantropiko" (Bini cover); "Cheer Up" (Twice cover); "Dream of Girls"; "Curious"; "Whatchu Need"	
October 26, 2024	Cebu City	Philippines	Waterfront Cebu City Hotel	"Superwoman"; "Dopamine"; "Poppin'"; "Datin' Myself"; "Pantropiko" (Bini cover); "Cheer Up" (Twice cover); "Dream of Girls"; "Curious"; "Whatchu Need"	
2026 1st Tour: EverLast
January 30, 2026	Philadelphia	United States	Theatre of Living Arts	"Swicy"; "DDANG!"; "Superwoman"; "Mwah..."; "Butterfly's Dream"; "Good Feeling"; "Baby" (Justin Bieber cover) (Note: Elisia, Kotoko, Seowon, Yoona, Yunha); "Paint the Town Red" (Doja Cat cover) (Note: Gehlee, Hyeonju, Nana); "Dopamine"; "Curious"; "Call Me Maybe" (Carly Rae Jepsen cover); "From a seed called 'Hey, what's up?"; "Moshimoshi"; "Spring rain"; "Whatchu Need"; "Cheer Up/TT/What Is Love?" (Twice covers) (Note: "Cheer Up" was performed at the first five U.S. stops, with "TT" replacing it starting from the rescheduled New York stop, and "What Is Love?" doing the same starting from the Dallas stop.); "Poppin'"	
February 1, 2026	Washington D.C.	United States	Howard Theatre	"Swicy"; "DDANG!"; "Superwoman"; "Mwah..."; "Butterfly's Dream"; "Good Feeling"; "Baby" (Justin Bieber cover); "Paint the Town Red" (Doja Cat cover); "Dopamine"; "Curious"; "Call Me Maybe" (Carly Rae Jepsen cover); "From a seed called 'Hey, what's up?"; "Moshimoshi"; "Spring rain"; "Whatchu Need"; "Cheer Up/TT/What Is Love?" (Twice covers); "Poppin'"	
February 3, 2026	Charlotte	United States	Amos' Southend	"Swicy"; "DDANG!"; "Superwoman"; "Mwah..."; "Butterfly's Dream"; "Good Feeling"; "Baby" (Justin Bieber cover); "Paint the Town Red" (Doja Cat cover); "Dopamine"; "Curious"; "Call Me Maybe" (Carly Rae Jepsen cover); "From a seed called 'Hey, what's up?"; "Moshimoshi"; "Spring rain"; "Whatchu Need"; "Cheer Up/TT/What Is Love?" (Twice covers); "Poppin'"	
February 4, 2026	Atlanta	United States	The Masquerade	"Swicy"; "DDANG!"; "Superwoman"; "Mwah..."; "Butterfly's Dream"; "Good Feeling"; "Baby" (Justin Bieber cover); "Paint the Town Red" (Doja Cat cover); "Dopamine"; "Curious"; "Call Me Maybe" (Carly Rae Jepsen cover); "From a seed called 'Hey, what's up?"; "Moshimoshi"; "Spring rain"; "Whatchu Need"; "Cheer Up/TT/What Is Love?" (Twice covers); "Poppin'"	
February 6, 2026	Jacksonville	United States	Terry Theatre	"Swicy"; "DDANG!"; "Superwoman"; "Mwah..."; "Butterfly's Dream"; "Good Feeling"; "Baby" (Justin Bieber cover); "Paint the Town Red" (Doja Cat cover); "Dopamine"; "Curious"; "Call Me Maybe" (Carly Rae Jepsen cover); "From a seed called 'Hey, what's up?"; "Moshimoshi"; "Spring rain"; "Whatchu Need"; "Cheer Up/TT/What Is Love?" (Twice covers); "Poppin'"	
February 7, 2026 (Note: Rescheduled from January 28, 2026)	New York	United States	Racket NYC	"Swicy"; "DDANG!"; "Superwoman"; "Mwah..."; "Butterfly's Dream"; "Good Feeling"; "Baby" (Justin Bieber cover); "Paint the Town Red" (Doja Cat cover); "Dopamine"; "Curious"; "Call Me Maybe" (Carly Rae Jepsen cover); "From a seed called 'Hey, what's up?"; "Moshimoshi"; "Spring rain"; "Whatchu Need"; "Cheer Up/TT/What Is Love?" (Twice covers); "Poppin'"	
February 10, 2026	Cleveland	United States	Globe Iron	"Swicy"; "DDANG!"; "Superwoman"; "Mwah..."; "Butterfly's Dream"; "Good Feeling"; "Baby" (Justin Bieber cover); "Paint the Town Red" (Doja Cat cover); "Dopamine"; "Curious"; "Call Me Maybe" (Carly Rae Jepsen cover); "From a seed called 'Hey, what's up?"; "Moshimoshi"; "Spring rain"; "Whatchu Need"; "Cheer Up/TT/What Is Love?" (Twice covers); "Poppin'"	
February 11, 2026	Chicago	United States	Park West	"Swicy"; "DDANG!"; "Superwoman"; "Mwah..."; "Butterfly's Dream"; "Good Feeling"; "Baby" (Justin Bieber cover); "Paint the Town Red" (Doja Cat cover); "Dopamine"; "Curious"; "Call Me Maybe" (Carly Rae Jepsen cover); "From a seed called 'Hey, what's up?"; "Moshimoshi"; "Spring rain"; "Whatchu Need"; "Cheer Up/TT/What Is Love?" (Twice covers); "Poppin'"	
February 13, 2026	Ottawa	United States	Ottawa Memorial Auditorium	"Swicy"; "DDANG!"; "Superwoman"; "Mwah..."; "Butterfly's Dream"; "Good Feeling"; "Baby" (Justin Bieber cover); "Paint the Town Red" (Doja Cat cover); "Dopamine"; "Curious"; "Call Me Maybe" (Carly Rae Jepsen cover); "From a seed called 'Hey, what's up?"; "Moshimoshi"; "Spring rain"; "Whatchu Need"; "Cheer Up/TT/What Is Love?" (Twice covers); "Poppin'"	
February 15, 2026	Dallas	United States	South Side Music Hall	"Swicy"; "DDANG!"; "Superwoman"; "Mwah..."; "Butterfly's Dream"; "Good Feeling"; "Baby" (Justin Bieber cover); "Paint the Town Red" (Doja Cat cover); "Dopamine"; "Curious"; "Call Me Maybe" (Carly Rae Jepsen cover); "From a seed called 'Hey, what's up?"; "Moshimoshi"; "Spring rain"; "Whatchu Need"; "Cheer Up/TT/What Is Love?" (Twice covers); "Poppin'"	
February 19, 2026	Buenos Aires	Argentina	C Art Media	"Swicy"; "DDANG!"; "Superwoman"; "Mwah..."; "Butterfly's Dream"; "Good Feeling"; "Baby" (Justin Bieber cover); "Paint the Town Red" (Doja Cat cover); "Dopamine"; "Curious"; "Call Me Maybe" (Carly Rae Jepsen cover); "From a seed called 'Hey, what's up?"; "Moshimoshi"; "Spring rain"; "Whatchu Need"; "Cheer Up/TT/What Is Love?" (Twice covers); "Poppin'"	
February 22, 2026	Santiago	Chile	Club Amanda	"Swicy"; "DDANG!"; "Superwoman"; "Mwah..."; "Butterfly's Dream"; "Good Feeling"; "Baby" (Justin Bieber cover); "Paint the Town Red" (Doja Cat cover); "Dopamine"; "Curious"; "Call Me Maybe" (Carly Rae Jepsen cover); "From a seed called 'Hey, what's up?"; "Moshimoshi"; "Spring rain"; "Whatchu Need"; "Cheer Up/TT/What Is Love?" (Twice covers); "Poppin'"	
February 25, 2026	Mexico City	Mexico	Foro Puebla 186	"Swicy"; "DDANG!"; "Superwoman"; "Mwah..."; "Butterfly's Dream"; "Good Feeling"; "Baby" (Justin Bieber cover); "Paint the Town Red" (Doja Cat cover); "Dopamine"; "Curious"; "Call Me Maybe" (Carly Rae Jepsen cover); "From a seed called 'Hey, what's up?"; "Moshimoshi"; "Spring rain"; "Whatchu Need"; "Cheer Up/TT/What Is Love?" (Twice covers); "Poppin'"	
February 27, 2026	Los Angeles	United States	Echoplex	"Swicy"; "DDANG!"; "Superwoman"; "Mwah..."; "Butterfly's Dream"; "Good Feeling"; "Baby" (Justin Bieber cover); "Paint the Town Red" (Doja Cat cover); "Dopamine"; "Curious"; "Call Me Maybe" (Carly Rae Jepsen cover); "From a seed called 'Hey, what's up?"; "Moshimoshi"; "Spring rain"; "Whatchu Need"; "Cheer Up/TT/What Is Love?" (Twice covers); "Poppin'"	

=== Music festivals ===
Event	Date	Location (Note: Venue, City, Country)	Performed song(s)	Ref.
Yuseong Culture Spa Festival 2024	May 11, 2024	Daejeon, South Korea	"Dream of Girls"; "Superwoman"; "Whatchu Need"; "Butterfly's Dream"; "Dopamine"	
SBS Mega Concert 2024	May 19, 2024	Incheon Munhak Stadium, Incheon, South Korea	"Superwoman"; "Dopamine"	
K-Wave Concert Inkigayo 2024	June 2, 2024	Inspire Arena, Incheon, South Korea	"Superwoman"	
K-Mega Concert 2024	July 13, 2024	Kaohsiung Arena, Kaohsiung, Taiwan	"So Hot / You're The Best / La Vie En Rose / Ice Cream Cake" (Wonder Girls / Mamamoo / Iz*One / Red Velvet cover); "Superwoman"; "Whatchu Need"; "Butterfly's Dream"; Dream of Girls; Dopamine	
Boryeong Mud Festival 2024	July 20, 2024	Daecheon Beach, Boryeong, South Korea	"Superwoman"; Dopamine	
Midsummer Night's Cultural Festival 2024	August 3, 2024	Haenam County Citizen Square, Haenam, South Korea	"Superwoman"; "Whatchu Need"; "What Is Love?" (Twice cover)	
Ulsan Summer Festival 2024	August 12, 2024	Ulsan Stadium, Ulsan, South Korea	"Curious"	
15th Incheon K-Pop Concert	September 7, 2024	Incheon Munhak Stadium, Incheon, South Korea	"Curious"; "Superwoman"	
Yes Con 2024	September 14, 2024	Yesan Stadium, Yesan, South Korea	"Curious"; "Poppin'"; "What Is Love?" (Twice cover); "Superwoman"	
Dream Concert 2024	October 19, 2024	Goyang Stadium, Goyang, South Korea	"TT" (Twice cover); "Curious'"	
KBS Song Festival 2024	December 20, 2024	KINTEX, Goyang, South Korea	"Curious"	
All Loud KT Pop 2025	May 31, 2025	Kaohsiung National Stadium, Kaohsiung, Taiwan	"Curious"; "DDANG! '"; "Cheer Up?" (Twice cover); "Poppin'"; "From a seed called 'Hey, what's up?"; "Swicy"	
K-Mega Concert in Sydney 2026	June 26, 2026	Qudos Bank Arena, Sydney, Australia	"Swicy"; "Mwah... (EN Ver.)"; "Whatchu Need"; "Dream of Girls"; "Moshimoshi (EN Ver.)"; "Curious"	

=== Award shows ===
Event	Date	Location	Performed song(s)	Ref.
2024 K-World Dream Awards	August 22, 2024	Jamsil Arena, Seoul, South Korea	"Poppin'"	
The Fact Music Awards 2024	September 8, 2024	Kyocera Dome, Osaka, Japan	"Curious"; "Superwoman"	
TikTok Awards 2024	November 15, 2024	Kyunghee University, Seoul, South Korea	"Poppin'"; "Curious"	
2024 Korea Grand Music Awards	November 17, 2024	Inspire Arena, Incheon, South Korea	"Curious" (KGMA ver.)	
1st D Awards	February 22, 2025	Korea University, Seoul, South Korea	"Curious"; "Superwoman"	
2025 Korea Grand Music Awards	November 15, 2025	Inspire Arena, Incheon, South Korea	"Swicy"	
KM Chart Awards 2026	July 25, 2026	Korea University, Seoul, South Korea	"Swicy" (Remix ver.)	

== Accolades ==
=== Awards and nominations ===
Name of the award ceremony, year presented, category, nominee of the award, and the result of the nomination
Award ceremony	Year	Category	Nominee / Work	Result	Ref.
Asia Artist Awards	2024	Popularity Award (Female Singer)	Unis	Nominated	
Asia Model Awards	2024	Popular Star Award (Singer)	Unis	Won	
Asian Pop Music Awards	2024	Best New Artist (Overseas)	We Unis	Nominated	
Brand Customer Loyalty Awards (Note: Korean Customers Council held its annual Brand Customer Loyalty Awards, which recognizes the brands that have the most influence on popular culture and society, as determined through consumer research.)	2025	Most Influential Female Idol (Hot Trend)	Unis	Won	
Brand of the Year Awards (Note: Established in 2003, Brand of the Year Awards is an awards ceremony based on nationwide surveys hosted by the Korea Consumer Brand Committee and organized by the Korea Consumer Forum.)	2024	Best Female Rookie	Unis	Won	
Brand of the Year Awards	2025	Female Idol	Unis	Won	
D Awards	2025	Dreams Silver Label	Unis	Won	
D Awards	2025	Discovery of the Year	Unis	Won	
D Awards	2025	Best Girl Group Popularity Award	Unis	Nominated	
Golden Disc Awards	2025	Most Popular Artist – Female	Unis	Nominated	
Golden Disc Awards	2025	Rookie Artist of the Year	Unis	Nominated	
Hanteo Music Awards	2024	Rookie of the Year – Female	Unis	Nominated	
Hanteo Music Awards	2024	WhosFandom Award – Female	Unis	Longlisted	
K-World Dream Awards	2024	K-World Dream Music Icon Award	Unis	Won	
K-World Dream Awards	2024	Upick Girl Group Popularity Award	Unis	Won	
K-World Dream Awards	2025	Girl Group Popularity Award	Unis	Won	
Korea Best Brand Awards	2024	Asia Star Award – Idol Star	Unis	Won	
Korea First Brand Awards (Note: The Korea First Brand Awards is hosted by the Korea Consumer Brand Committee and the Korea Consumer Forum. Awards are based on a nationwide survey held in South Korea.)	2025	Female Rookie Idol	Unis	Won	
Korea Grand Music Awards	2024	Trend of the Year (K-pop Group)	Unis	Won	
Korea Grand Music Awards	2024	IS Rookies	Unis	Won	
Korea Grand Music Awards	2024	Lullua x Fancast Best Popularity	Unis	Nominated	
Korea Grand Music Awards	2024	Fan Vote Rookie (Female)	Unis	Nominated	
Korea Grand Music Awards	2024	Caliverse, Transcedent Artist of the Year	Unis	Nominated	
Korea Grand Music Awards	2025	Best Music Video	Curious	Nominated	
Korea Grand Music Awards	2025	Best Popularity - Music Day	Unis	Nominated	
Korea Grand Music Awards	2025	BIGC Global Star Award	Unis	Nominated	
Korea Grand Music Awards	2025	Best Listener's Pick	"See You in My Dream"	Nominated	
Korea Grand Music Awards	2025	Best Listener's Pick	"Swicy"	Won	
Korea Grand Music Awards	2025	Style Icon	Unis	Won	
Korean Culture and Entertainment Awards	2024	K-pop Award	Unis	Won	
MAMA Awards	2024	Fans' Choice Female	Unis	Won	
MAMA Awards	2024	Artist of the Year	Unis	Nominated	
MAMA Awards	2024	Best New Female Artist	Unis	Nominated	
MAMA Awards	2024	Fans' Choice of the Year	Unis	Nominated	
MAMA Awards	2025	Fans' Choice Female	Unis	Nominated	
MAMA Awards	2025	VISA Fans' Choice of the Year	Unis	Nominated	
Philippine K-pop Awards	2024	Rookie of the Year	Unis	Won	
Seoul Music Awards	2025	Main Prize (Bonsang)	Unis	Nominated	
Seoul Music Awards	2025	K-pop World Choice – Group	Unis	Nominated	
Seoul Music Awards	2025	K-Wave Special Award	Unis	Nominated	
Seoul Music Awards	2025	Popularity Award	Unis	Nominated	
The Fact Music Awards	2024	Hottest Award	Unis	Won	
The Fact Music Awards	2024	Today's Choice Award	Unis	Won	
TikTok Awards Korea	2024	New Rising Star (Female)	Unis	Won	
VP Choice Awards (Note: Produced by Village Pipol and Red Entertainment Inc., it recognizes individuals, brands, and creators who have flourished in their respective fields.)	2025	K-Pop Act of the Year	Unis	Nominated	

=== Listicles ===
Name of publisher, year listed, name of listicle, and placement
Publisher	Year	Listicle	Placement	Ref.
Billboard Korea	2025	K-Pop Rookie of the Month – February	Placed	
Grammys	2024	12 Rising Girl Groups To Know Now	Placed	
