= Swicy =

- Digital cover

EP by Unis
- Released: April 15, 2025
- Genre: K-pop
- Length: 14:37
- Languages: Korean; English
- Labels: F&F; Kakao; Universal Philippines

Unis chronology
| Curious (2024) | Swicy (2025) |

Singles from Swicy
- 1. "Swicy" Released: April 15, 2025

Swicy is the second extended play by South Korean girl group Unis. It was released on April 15, 2025, by F&F Entertainment. The album consists of five tracks, including the title track, "Swicy".

== Background ==
Unis unveiled concept photos for their second EP Swicy On April 1, 2025. They held a showcase for the release at the YES24 Live Hall in Gwangjang-dong, Seoul, on April 15th.

== Commercial performance ==
The EP sold 58,479 copies in South Korea. It peaked at number 3 on the Circle Album Chart.

== Track listing ==
Swicy track listing
| No. | Title | Lyrics | Music | Arrangement | Length |
|---|---|---|---|---|---|
| 1. | "'뭐해?'라는 씨앗에서" (In the seeds 'What are you doing?') | Brother Su; Paprikaa; Iris | Strawberrybananaclub; Brother Su; Paprikaa; Iris | Strawberrybananaclub | 3:03 |
| 2. | "Swicy" | Dalie (Jam Factory); Lee Hye-yum (Jam Factory); Moon Ji-young (Lalala Studio); Park Seong-hee (Jam Factory) | Nano (Vendors); Coll!n (Vendors); Youha; Click; 37; Ha Hyeong-eon; Noor | Click; 37; Ha Hyeong-eon | 3:03 |
| 3. | "땡!" (Ddang!) | Brother Su; Paprikaa | Brother Su; Paprikaa; Chicok; Eniac | Chicok; Eniac | 2:33 |
| 4. | "Good Feeling" | Hwang Hye-rim (Jam Factory); Lee Na-yoon (Jam Factory); Alex Keem; Sarah Johnson; Yumare (Jam Factory); Gujo (153/Joombas); Hanahi (153/Joombas); Yelly (153/Joombas); Softserveboy; Edwin Honoret | Softserveboy; Edwin Honoret; Alex Keem | Softserveboy | 2:58 |
| 5. | "봄비" (Spring Rain) | Seo Jeong-ah; Chungyoon | Toyo; Mayu Wakisaka | Toyo | 3:00 |
| Total length: | | | | | 14:37 |

== Charts ==
=== Weekly charts ===
Weekly chart performance for Swicy
| Chart (2025) | Peak position |
|---|---|
| South Korean Albums (Circle) | 3 |

=== Monthly charts ===
Monthly chart performance for Swicy
| Chart (2025) | Position |
|---|---|
| South Korean Albums (Circle) | 24 |
