= Curious (single album) =

- Digital cover

Single album by Unis
- Released: August 6, 2024
- Genre: K-pop
- Length: 9:18
- Languages: Korean; English
- Labels: F&F; Kakao; Universal Philippines

Unis chronology
We Unis (2024)	Curious (2024)	Swicy (2025)

Singles from Curious
- 1. "Curious" Released: August 6, 2024

Curious (Korean: 너만 몰라; RR: Neoman molla) is the first single album by South Korean girl band Unis. It was released on August 6, 2024, by F&F Entertainment. The album consists of three tracks, including the title track, "Curious".

== Commercial performance ==
The single album sold 68,780 copies in South Korea. It peaked at number 5 on the Circle Album Chart.

== Track listing ==
Curious track listing
No.	Title	Lyrics	Music	Arrangement	Length
1.	"Curious" (너만 몰라)	Seo Ga-yeon (153/Joombas); Rizin (153/Joombas); Choi Ji-ae (Jam Factory)	Ryan Jhun; Marc Sibley; Nathan Cunningham; Lauren Aquilina; Marcus Andersson; Allison Kaplan; Cimo Frankel; Rik Annema	Ryan Jhun; Space Primates	3:12
2.	"Datin' Myself"	Kim Eun-kyung (153/Joombas); Znee; Ryu I-som; Seo Ji-hyang (153/Joombas); Chamo (153/Joombas); Mau.ve (153/Joombas); Five O'Clock (MUMW)	Ryan Jhun; Chaz William Mishan; Ronnie Icon; Nicole Timms; Shawn Wasabi	Ryan Jhun; Chaz Mishan	3:13
3.	"Poppin'"	Choi Bo-ra (153/Joombas); Lee Bo-mi (153/Joombas); Alex Keem; Sarah Johnson; Jung Na-gyeong (153/Joombas)	Phil Schwan; Joe Chen; Avenue 52; Alex Keem; Anniina Timonen	Phil Schwan; Joe Chen	2:53
Total length:					9:18

== Charts ==
=== Weekly charts ===
Weekly chart performance for Curious
Chart (2024)	Peak position
South Korean Albums (Circle)	5

=== Monthly charts ===
Monthly chart performance for Curious
Chart (2024)	Position
South Korean Albums (Circle)	24

== Release history ==
Release dates and formats for Curious
Region	Date	Format	Label
South Korea	August 6, 2024	CD; digital download; streaming	F&F; Kakao
Various	August 6, 2024	digital download; streaming	F&F; Kakao
Philippines	December 2, 2024	CD	Universal
