= Busters (group) =

South Korean girl group

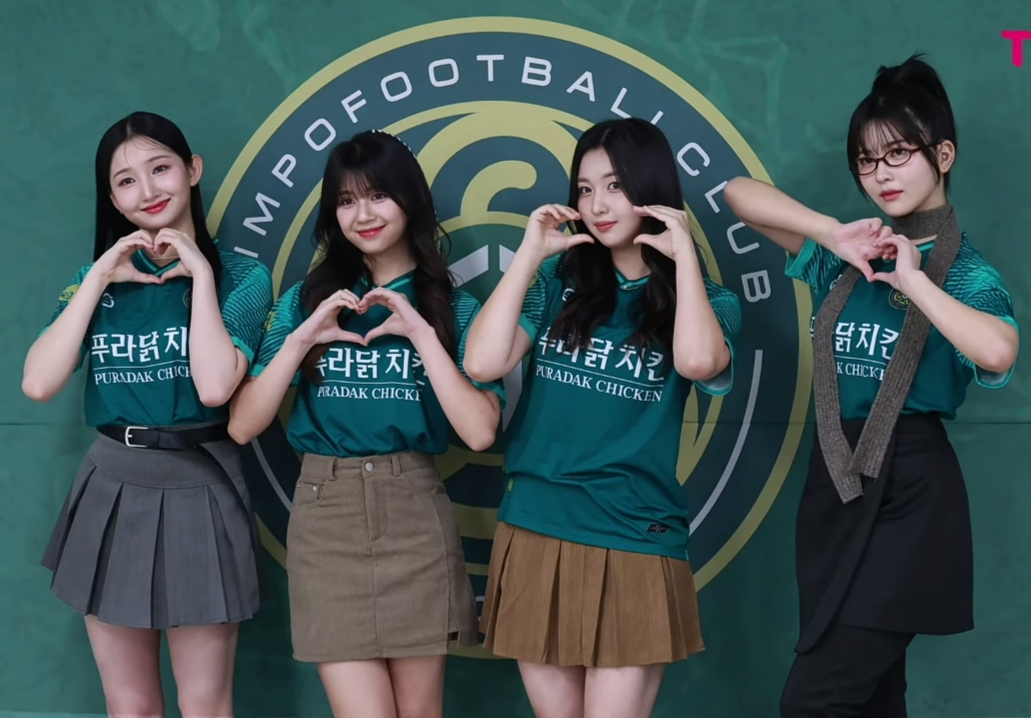
- Busters in October 2024; From left to right: Minji, Nami, Jieun and Takara

Background information
- Origin: Seoul, South Korea
- Genre: K-pop
- Years active: 2017–2025
- Labels: Marbling E&M Inc.; JTG Entertainment
- Past members: Nami; Soyeon; Minjung; Minji; Hyungseo; Jisoo; Seira; Chaeyeon; Takara; Jieun; Yeseo; Minmin; Minji; Yunji
- Website: http://marblingg.com

Busters (Korean: 버스터즈) was a five-member South Korean girl group formed by Marbling E&M Inc. and JTG Entertainment in 2017. The group was reorganized in 2020 after the original members left the company and the group.

== History ==
Busters were formed to promote Monstergram’s upcoming TV series Idol Rangers Power Busters. Prior to their debut, the group promoted with Chaeyeon, Jisoo, Hyungseo, Minji, and Soyeon. Soyeon left the group and was replaced by Minjung. They released their debut single album Dream On on November 27, 2017, and they made a comeback with their second single album Grapes on June 12, 2018.

On January 26, 2019, it was announced through the Marbling official YouTube account that Minjung had left the group. She was replaced by Yeseo at the end of the month. They released their first extended play Pinky Promise on July 31, 2019, marking the official debut of member Yeseo. On November 18, 2019, it was announced that Minji had left the group for personal reasons. On December 10, 2019, it was announced through the Busters official fan cafe that Jieun had joined the group.

On March 17, 2020, Marbling Entertainment added two new members to Busters, Takara and Jeon Minji, making Busters a six-member group. On March 29, Hyungseo posted a letter to the official fan cafe announcing her departure due to her wanting to focus on her studies. Chaeyeon didn't participate in the comeback due to conflicting schedules caused by her MC position in Boni Hani. The group made their comeback with their third single album Paeonia on May 13, 2020.

On August 6, 2020, Marbling Entertainment announced that the group would be disbanding and be reorganized. Jisoo, Yeseo, and Chaeyeon left the group to pursue acting and other activities, while the remaining members Minji, Jieun, and Takara would be joined by a foreign member to pursue promotions as Power Busters.

On May 20, 2021, Busters was reorganized into a five-member group, with the addition of members Seira and Minmin. On October 22, 2021, new member Yunji performed with Busters for the first time during a concert at Jeongdong Theater. On October 24, 2021, it was announced that Minmin had officially left the group.

On March 28, 2022, it was announced that Busters will make their re-debut with the single Re:Born on April 27.

On July 11, 2022, Busters released the new single album Tropical Romance. On November 1, 2022, it was announced that Busters would hold a solo performance in Japan on December 9, 2022. Initially planned with all 5 members to perform, it was later announced that member Yunji would not be participating, due to personal circumstances. A special guest was invited to fill Yunji's position instead.

On June 2, 2023, Marbling Entertainment announced that Nami, previously appeared as guest member during KCON Japan 2023, will officially join the group, and confirming Yunji's departure from the group due to personal circumstances, and Busters will active as a five-member group.

On the 20th of March 2025, it was announced that members Takara, Jieun and Minji had left the group. And the next day, on the 21st, Seira also announced that she would be leaving the group. On March 7th of 2025, Marbling Entertainment announced the group would be replaced with AI members confirming the disbandment of the group.

== Members ==
=== Former members ===
- Park So-yeon (박소연)
- Cha Min-jung (차민정)
- Kim Min-ji (김민지)
- Myung Hyung-seo (명형서)
- Kang Ye-seo (강예서)
- Kim Chae-yeon (김채연)
- Takara Yasuda (安田聖良) (야스다 타카라)
- Jeon Ji-eun (전지은)
- Jung Ji-soo (정지수)
- Seira Tai (田井星空) (타이 세이라)
- Minmin (민민)
- Jeon Min-ji (전민지)
- Yunji (윤지)
- Nami (น้ำ) (나미)

=== Timeline ===
Pre-debut
Active
Inactive
Album release

== Discography ==
=== Extended plays ===
Title	EP details	Peak chart positions	Sales
Title	EP details	KOR	Sales
Pinky Promise	Released: July 31, 2019; Label: Marbling E&M, Genie Music; Formats: CD, digital download; Track listing: 1. Starlight (별 헤는 밤); 2. Pinky Promise (핑키프로미스); 3. Sour Sweet (새콤달콤); 4. Lucky Lucky; 5. TuTuTu (뚜뚜뚜)	31	KOR: 2,870

=== Single albums ===
Title	Album details	Peak chart positions	Sales
Title	Album details	KOR	Sales
Dream On	Released: November 27, 2017; Label: Marbling E&M, Genie Music; Formats: CD, digital download; Track listing: 1. Dream On (내꿈꿔); 2. Lalala (랄랄라); 3. Dream On (내꿈꿔) (Inst.); 4. Lalala (랄랄라) (Inst.)	44	—N/a
Grapes	Released: June 12, 2018; Label: Marbling E&M, Genie Music; Formats: CD, digital download; Track listing: 1. Grapes (포도포도해); 2. Responsibility (책임져); 3. Grapes (포도포도해) (Inst.); 4. Responsibility (책임져) (Inst.)	36	KOR: 1,399
Paeonia	Released: May 13, 2020; Label: Marbling E&M, Genie Music; Formats: CD, digital download; Track listing: 1. Paeonia (피오니아); 2. Cherry Blossom (벚꽃이 피면); 3. Paeonia (피오니아) (Inst.); 4. Cherry Blossom (벚꽃이 피면) (Inst.)	33	KOR: 1,947
Re:Born	Released: April 27, 2022; Label: Marbling E&M, Genie Music; Formats: digital download; Track listing: 1. Futt (풋); 2. Aiya (아이야); 3. Broken Clock (고장난 시계); 4. Futt (풋); 5. Aiya (아이야) (Inst.); 6. Broken Clock (고장난 시계) (Inst.)	—	—N/a
Tropical Romance	Released: July 11, 2022; Label: Marbling E&M, Genie Music; Formats: digital download; Track listing: 1. Tropical Romance (여름인걸); 2. Tropical Romance (여름인걸) (Inst.)	—	—N/a
Broken Clock	Released: September 5, 2022; Label: Marbling E&M, Genie Music; Formats: digital download; Track listing: 1. Broken Clock (고장난 시계); 2. # Broken Clock (고장난 시계) (Inst.)		

=== Singles ===
Title	Year	Peak chart positions		Album
Title	Year	KOR	KOR Hot	Album
"Dream On" (내꿈꿔)	2017	—	—	Dream On
"Grapes" (포도포도해)	2018	—	—	Grapes
"Pinky Promise" (핑키프로미스)	2019	—	95	Pinky Promise
"Paeonia" (피오니아)	2020	—	—	Paeonia
"Futt" (풋)	2022	—	—	Re:Born
"Tropical Romance" (여름인걸)	2022	—	—	Tropical Romance
"—" denotes releases that did not chart or were not released in that region.

== Filmography ==
=== Music videos ===
Year	Title	Director(s)
2017	"Dream On"	Shindong (Super Junior)
2017	"Lalala"	Shindong (Super Junior)
2018	"Grapes"	Vlending
2018	"Grapes (Choreography ver.)"	Shindong (Super Junior)
2019	"Pinky Promise"	Vlending
2020	"Paeonia"	Hwang Hyun-jin (DIRECTORS' CUT PHOTOGRAPHER STUDIO)
2022	"Futt"	—N/a
2022	"Tropical Romance"	Director's Cut Photographer Studio
2022	"Broken Clock"	Lee Gyuie

== Awards and nominations ==
=== Korea Brand Awards ===
Year	Nominee / work	Award	Result
2018	Busters	Female Rookie of the Year	Nominated

=== Korea Culture Entertainment Awards ===
Year	Nominee / work	Award	Result
2017	Busters	Rookie of the Year	Won
2018	Busters	K-pop Singers Award	Won

=== Korea Environment Culture Awards ===
Year	Nominee / work	Award	Result
2017	Busters	Global Asia Star Award in Culture	Won

=== Korean Wave Awards ===
Year	Nominee / work	Award	Result
2019	Busters	Rising Star Award for Popular Culture	Won
