= Who Is Princess? =

2021 Japanese reality competition show

- Also known as: Who Is Princess?: Girls Group Debut Survival Program
- Genre: Reality competition
- Presented by: Takanori Nishikawa
- Theme music composer: Galacktica
- Opening theme: "Fun"
- Country of origin: Japan
- Original languages: Japanese; Korean (spoken)
- No. of episodes: 15

Production
- Production location: Japan
- Running time: 30–40 minutes
- Production company: FNC Entertainment Japan

Original release
- Network: Hulu Japan; Nippon TV
- Release: October 5, 2021 – January 23, 2022

Who Is Princess?: Girls Group Debut Survival Program is a Japanese reality competition show. The series was a joint project between FNC Entertainment Japan and Nippon TV with the intention of creating a Japanese girl group aimed at a global audience. The show was presented by Takanori Nishikawa. The winners of the show debuted as the group Prikil in May 2022.

Who Is Princess? premiered on October 5, 2021, and is available for streaming on Hulu Japan, GyaO!, Weverse, SoftBank VR Square, and iQIYI. An abridged version was serialized on Nippon TV's variety show Shu-ichi with live commentary from the show's panelists beginning on October 3, 2021.

== Background ==
Who Is Princess?: Girls Group Debut Survival Program was announced on September 19, 2021. The series was created in cooperation with FNC Entertainment and Nippon TV to create a 5-member Japanese girl group with a "girl crush" concept aimed at a global audience out of 15 contestants. The theme song, "Fun", is composed by Galacktica, and its music video was released on the same day of the announcement, with the dance choreographed by Kiel Tutin. The show was scheduled to broadcast on Hulu Japan, GyaO!, Weverse, SoftBank VR Square, and iQiyi beginning October 5, 2021. An abridged version was serialized on Nippon TV's variety show Shu-ichi with live commentary from the show's panelists beginning on October 3, 2021.

The show is hosted by Takanori Nishikawa. The mentors, known as "oni coaches", consist of Bae Eun-kyoung (dance), Ryoko Sato (vocal), and Mayuko Kawakita (modeling).

== Contestants ==
The contestants in Who Is Princess? consist of 15 girls, with a combined average age of 15.6 years.

Contestant	Region	Age	Dance experience
Rin	Fukuoka	13	8 years
Rinko	Chiba	14	1 year
Sena	Tokyo	13	4 years
Yuu	Saitama	17	4 years
Ran	Saitama	14	2 years
Rio	Fukushima	17	11 years
Uta	Osaka	14	1 year
Nana	Tokyo	14	9 years
Yumeko	Tokyo	18	11 years
Rinka	Kumamoto	19	2 years
Coco	Saitama	17	1 year
Honoka	Saitama	16	2 years
Nijika	Fukuoka	16	9 years
Aina	Osaka	18	13 years
Yukino	Kyoto	14	5 years

== Episodes ==
No.	Title	Original release date
1	"Episode 1"	October 5, 2021
2	"Episode 2"	October 12, 2021
3	"Episode 3"	October 19, 2021
4	"Episode 4"	October 26, 2021
5	"Episode 5"	October 31, 2021
6	"Episode 6"	November 7, 2021
7	"Episode 7"	November 12, 2021
8	"Episode 8"	November 19, 2021
9	"Episode 9"	November 26, 2021
10	"Episode 10"	December 6, 2021
11	"Episode 11"	December 11, 2021
12	"Episode 12"	December 18, 2021
13	"Episode 13"	January 10, 2022
14	"Episode 14"	January 17, 2022
15	"Episode 15"	January 23, 2022
Specials
SP1	"Special 1"	December 25, 2021
SP2	"Special 2"	January 3, 2022

== Rankings ==
The contestants are arranged into two groups: Princess and Challenger. Being a Princess increases chances of debut, while being a Challenger increases risk of elimination.

=== Summary ===
Color key

Final members of Prikil
Princess
Challenger
Eliminated

Contestant	Evaluation	Mission 1 (eps. 1-3)	Mission 2 (eps. 4-7)	Mission 3 (ep. 8)	Mission 4 (eps. 9-10)	Mission 5 (eps. 11-12)	Final Mission (eps. 13-15)
Uta	Princess	Challenger	Challenger	Princess	Challenger	Princess	Won
Rinko	Princess	Princess	Princess	Challenger	Princess	Challenger	Won
Rin	Challenger	Princess	Princess	Challenger	Challenger	Princess	Won
Yukino	Challenger	Challenger	Challenger	Challenger	Challenger	Challenger	Won
Nana	Princess	Princess	Princess	Princess	Princess	Challenger	Won
Yumeko	Princess	Princess	Princess	Challenger	Princess	Princess	Eliminated
Honoka	Challenger	Challenger	Princess	Challenger	Princess	Princess	Eliminated
Rio	Princess	Princess	Challenger	Princess	Challenger	Princess	Eliminated
Yuu	Challenger	Challenger	Challenger	Challenger	Princess	Challenger	Eliminated
Nijika	Princess	Princess	Princess	Princess	Princess	Challenger	Eliminated
Ran	Challenger	Challenger	Challenger	Princess	Challenger	Eliminated	
Aina	Challenger	Princess	Challenger	Challenger	Challenger	Eliminated	
Coco	Challenger	Challenger	Princess	Princess	Eliminated		
Rinka	Princess	Challenger	Eliminated				
Sena	Challenger	Eliminated					

=== Boys Group Dance Battle ===
Mission 1 is the Boys Group Dance Battle. In episodes 1 through 3, the contestants were split into two groups, Princess and Challenger, by Bae Eun-kyung, after evaluations for the "Fun" music video. Each group was assigned choreographies from boy band songs. The contestants are then reassigned groups based on the mentors' evaluations, and one Challenger is eliminated from the show.

Order	Team	Contestant	Song	Result
1	Challenger	Coco	"Kick It" (NCT 127)	Challenger
1	Challenger	Ran	"Kick It" (NCT 127)	Challenger
1	Challenger	Yuu	"Kick It" (NCT 127)	Challenger
1	Challenger	Yukino	"Kick It" (NCT 127)	Challenger
1	Challenger	Aina	"Kick It" (NCT 127)	Princess
1	Challenger	Sena	"Kick It" (NCT 127)	Eliminated
1	Challenger	Honoka	"Kick It" (NCT 127)	Challenger
1	Challenger	Rin	"Kick It" (NCT 127)	Princess
2	Princess	Nijika	"Back Door" (Stray Kids)	Princess
2	Princess	Rinka	"Back Door" (Stray Kids)	Challenger
2	Princess	Uta	"Back Door" (Stray Kids)	Challenger
2	Princess	Nana	"Back Door" (Stray Kids)	Princess
2	Princess	Yumeko	"Back Door" (Stray Kids)	Princess
2	Princess	Rio	"Back Door" (Stray Kids)	Princess
2	Princess	Rinko	"Back Door" (Stray Kids)	Princess

=== Solo Performance Battle ===
Mission 2 is the Solo Performance Battle. In episodes 4 through 7, each Princess and Challenger must duel in a two-round performance battle consisting of a vocal performance and a dance performance. Ryoko Sato is introduced as the vocal coach, while Bae Eun-kyoung oversaw the dance performance. The contestants are then reassigned groups based on the mentors, with one Challenger eliminated from the show.

Order	Contestant	Solo Vocal Battle	Solo Dance Battle	Outcome	Result
1	Yumeko	"Yonaga Uta" (Kami wa Saikoro o Furanai)	"Hard Carry" (Got7)	Won	Princess
1	Uta	"Yonaga Uta" (Kami wa Saikoro o Furanai)	"Hard Carry" (Got7)	Lost	Challenger
2	Rio	"Tada Kimi ni Hare" (Yorushika)	"Sayonara Hitori" (Taemin)	Lost	Challenger
2	Honoka	"Tada Kimi ni Hare" (Yorushika)	"Sayonara Hitori" (Taemin)	Won	Princess
3	Rinko	"Tadashiku Narenai" (Zutomayo)	"Latata" ((G)I-dle)	Won	Princess
3	Yukino	"Tadashiku Narenai" (Zutomayo)	"Latata" ((G)I-dle)	Lost	Challenger
4	Aina	"Strange Clouds" (B.o.B)	"Hip" (Mamamoo)	Lost	Challenger
4	Coco	"Strange Clouds" (B.o.B)	"Hip" (Mamamoo)	Won	Princess
5	Nijika	"Hana ni Bōrei" (Yorushika)	"I Can't Stop Me" (Twice)	Won	Princess
5	Rinka	"Hana ni Bōrei" (Yorushika)	"I Can't Stop Me" (Twice)	Lost	Eliminated
6	Rin	"24-25" (Iri)	"Not Shy" (Itzy)	Won	Princess
6	Ran	"24-25" (Iri)	"Not Shy" (Itzy)	Lost	Challenger
7	Nana	"Snow Jam" (Rinne)	"Shine" (Pentagon)	Won	Princess
7	Yuu	"Snow Jam" (Rinne)	"Shine" (Pentagon)	Lost	Challenger

=== Popteen Photo Shooting Battle ===
Mission 3 is the Popteen Photo Shooting Battle, led by Mayuko Kawakita as the contestants' mentor. The contestants are assigned to pick and coordinate an outfit from 551 items on a theme, with the photo shoot published in the January 2022 issue of the magazine Popteen. When finished, the contestants are then evaluated by Nishikawa, Kawakita, and Popteen models Non Koizumi and Yume Kawabata through a runway show and a photo shoot. Nishikawa announced there will be no eliminations for this mission.

Order	Contestant	Theme	Result
1	Honoka	Ulzzang	Challenger
2	Nana	Ulzzang	Princess
3	Rinko	Girly	Challenger
4	Coco	Mature	Princess
5	Nijika	Ulzzang	Princess
6	Rin	Mature	Challenger
7	Yumeko	Mature	Challenger
8	Ran	Street	Princess
9	Yukino	Girly	Challenger
10	Uta	Street	Princess
11	Aina	Street	Challenger
12	Rio	Sporty	Princess
13	Yuu	Sporty	Challenger

=== J-pop × K-pop Performance Battle ===
Mission 4 is the J-pop × K-pop Performance Battle, where Princesses and Challengers are shuffled into three teams. Each team is performing a J-pop song with original K-pop dance choreography. One person from the losing team is eliminated.

Order	Team	Contestant	Song	Battle Outcome	Result
1	Hanabi	Nana (leader)	"Yoru ni Kakeru" (Yoasobi)	1st place	Princess
1	Hanabi	Nijika	"Yoru ni Kakeru" (Yoasobi)	1st place	Princess
1	Hanabi	Rinko	"Yoru ni Kakeru" (Yoasobi)	1st place	Princess
1	Hanabi	Yukino	"Yoru ni Kakeru" (Yoasobi)	1st place	Challenger
2	Destiny (Note: No leader was picked for their group.)	Coco	"Pretender" (Official Hige Dandism)	Last place	Eliminated
2	Destiny	Rio	"Pretender" (Official Hige Dandism)	Last place	Challenger
2	Destiny	Aina	"Pretender" (Official Hige Dandism)	Last place	Challenger
2	Destiny	Yuu	"Pretender" (Official Hige Dandism)	Last place	Princess
2	Destiny	Honoka	"Pretender" (Official Hige Dandism)	Last place	Princess
3	Transient Bloom of Blood-red Flowers (血華儚咲, Kekka Bōshō)	Uta	"Gurenge" (Lisa)	2nd place	Challenger
3	Transient Bloom of Blood-red Flowers (血華儚咲, Kekka Bōshō)	Ran	"Gurenge" (Lisa)	2nd place	Challenger
3	Transient Bloom of Blood-red Flowers (血華儚咲, Kekka Bōshō)	Yumeko (leader)	"Gurenge" (Lisa)	2nd place	Princess
3	Transient Bloom of Blood-red Flowers (血華儚咲, Kekka Bōshō)	Rin	"Gurenge" (Lisa)	2nd place	Challenger

=== Girls Group Performance Battle ===
Mission 5 is the Semi Final Mission, later renamed the Girls Group Performance Battle, where the Princess and Challenger teams are performing a song from a K-pop girl group. Two Challengers are eliminated from the show.

Order	Team	Contestant	Song	Result
1	Challenger	Yukino	"How You Like That" (Blackpink)	Challenger
1	Challenger	Uta	"How You Like That" (Blackpink)	Princess
1	Challenger	Rin	"How You Like That" (Blackpink)	Princess
1	Challenger	Ran	"How You Like That" (Blackpink)	Eliminated
1	Challenger	Rio	"How You Like That" (Blackpink)	Princess
1	Challenger	Aina	"How You Like That" (Blackpink)	Eliminated
2	Princess	Nana	"Wannabe" (Itzy)	Challenger
2	Princess	Nijika	"Wannabe" (Itzy)	Challenger
2	Princess	Rinko	"Wannabe" (Itzy)	Challenger
2	Princess	Yumeko	"Wannabe" (Itzy)	Princess
2	Princess	Honoka	"Wannabe" (Itzy)	Princess
2	Princess	Yuu	"Wannabe" (Itzy)	Challenger

=== Original Song Performance Battle ===
In episodes 13 through 15, the finals were split into two rounds. The teams performed the theme song "Fun" for the first round and "Somebody", an original song by Galacktica, for the second round. Both rounds were judged by Galacktica.

Team	Contestant	Round 1		Round 2		Result
Team	Contestant	Order	Song	Order	Song	Result
Challenger	Nana	1	"Fun"	1	"Somebody"	Won
Challenger	Nijika	1	"Fun"	1	"Somebody"	Eliminated
Challenger	Rinko	1	"Fun"	1	"Somebody"	Won
Challenger	Yuu	1	"Fun"	1	"Somebody"	Eliminated
Challenger	Yukino	1	"Fun"	1	"Somebody"	Won
Princess	Yumeko	2	"Fun"	2	"Somebody"	Eliminated
Princess	Rio	2	"Fun"	2	"Somebody"	Eliminated
Princess	Honoka	2	"Fun"	2	"Somebody"	Eliminated
Princess	Uta	2	"Fun"	2	"Somebody"	Won
Princess	Rin	2	"Fun"	2	"Somebody"	Won
