= True Beauty =

True Beauty may refer to:

- True Beauty (album), the debut studio album by American Idol contestant Mandisa
- True Beauty (American TV series), a 2009 reality television series which aired on ABC
- True Beauty (webtoon), a South Korean webtoon by Yaongyi
  - True Beauty (South Korean TV series), a 2020–21 television series based from the webtoon, starring Moon Ga-young, Cha Eun-woo and Hwang In-yeop
