= Hwiyoung =

South Korean singer (born 1999)

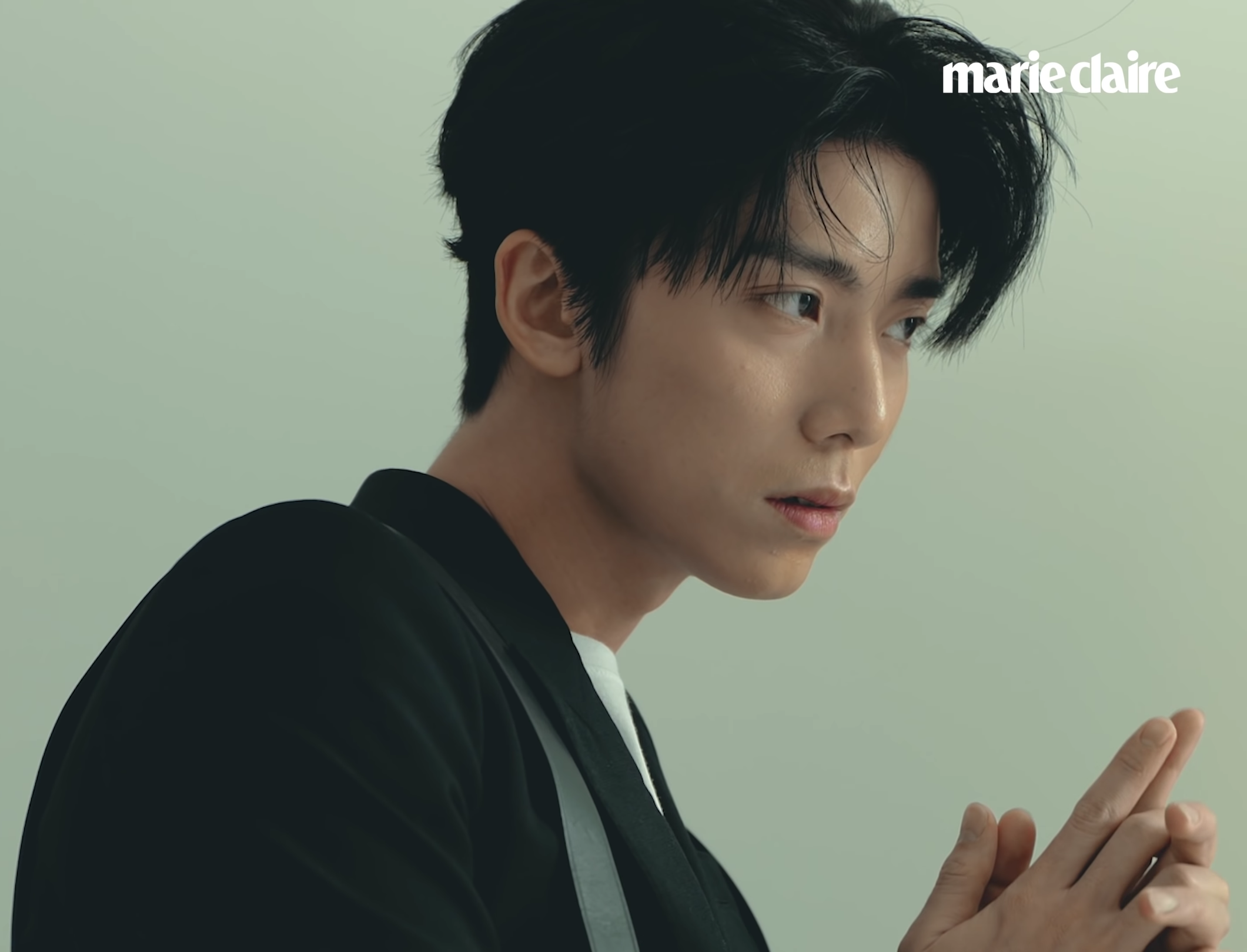
- Hwiyoung in 2021
- Born: Kim Young-kyun; May 11, 1999 (age 27); Busan, South Korea
- Occupations: Singer; rapper; actor
- Years active: 2016–present
- Height: 178 cm (5 ft 10 in)
- Musical career
- Genre: K-pop
- Label: FNC
- Member of: SF9

Korean name
- Hangul: 김영균
- RR: Gim Yeonggyun
- MR: Kim Yŏnggyun

Stage name
- Hangul: 휘영
- RR: Hwiyeong
- MR: Hwiyŏng

Kim Young-kyun (Korean: 김영균; born May 11, 1999), also known by his stage name Hwiyoung (휘영), is a South Korean singer, rapper, and actor. He is a member of the South Korean boy band SF9.

He debuted as a solo artist on August 13, 2023, with the digital single "Drive5" and released his first single album Traveling Fish on June 20, 2024.

Hwiyoung trained to be a k-pop idol and performer in the talent company FNC Entertainment's rookie training program Neoz School. In 2016, he competed in the nine-member dance group NEOZ Dance on the Mnet survival reality show d.o.b.: Dance or Band, where he and his group mates competed for a chance to debut as FNC's first boy dance group. They won the competition, and debuted as FNC's first male dance group with the group name SF9 (short for Sensational Feeling 9). They released their first single "Fanfare" on October 5, 2016.

As an actor, Hwiyoung began his career with a supporting role in the interactive web drama Click Your Heart (2016), later played a support character in the drama Imitation (2021), web drama Miracle (2022), and The Matchmakers (2023).

== Career ==
In 2015, he was a part of a pre-debut team, "Neoz School", under FNC Entertainment as a member of the group called NEOZ. In May 2016, he participated as a member of "NEOZ Dance" in FNC Entertainment's survival show d.o.b : Dance or Band, competing against NEOZ Band (later known as Honeyst). "NEOZ Dance" won the competition with 51% of the votes and received the opportunity to debut. He debuted with group SF9 on October 5, 2016, with their debut album Feeling Sensation, featuring their first single "Fanfare".

== Discography ==
=== Single album ===
List of albums, showing selected details, selected chart positions, and sales figures
Title	Details	Peak chart positions	Sales
Title	Details	KOR	Sales
Traveling Fish	Released: June 20, 2024; Label: FNC Entertainment; Formats: CD, digital download, streaming	28	KOR: 4,339

=== Singles ===
==== As lead artist ====
List of singles as lead artist, showing year released, selected chart positions, and name of the album
Title	Year	Peak chart positions	Album
Title	Year	KOR Down.	Album
"Drive5"	2023	—	Traveling Fish
"HBD"	2023	—	Traveling Fish
"It Is Love ♥"	2024	95	Traveling Fish
"—" denotes a recording that did not chart or was not released in that territory

==== As featured artist ====
List of singles as featured artist, showing year released, and name of the album
Title	Year	Album
"Burn" (4bout and Hemo featuring Hwiyoung)	2022	Omnibus
"Workin" (24 Flakko & Cribs featuring Hwiyoung)	2023	Lotto, Pt. II

=== Soundtracks ===
List of soundtracks, showing year released, and name of the album
Title	Year	Album
"Love Gradation" (with Inseong)	2020	DokGoBin Is Updating OST
"Malo" (with Lee Jun-young, Kang Chan-hee, Ahn Jeong-hun, Park Yu-ri, and Choi Jong-ho) (Note: As Leehyun with members of Shax.)	2021	Imitation OST
"Amen" (with Lee Jun-young, Kang Chan-hee, Ahn Jeong-hun, Park Yu-ri, and Choi Jong-ho)	2021	Imitation OST
"Your Sign" (별자리; Shax version) (with Lee Jun-young, Kang Chan-hee, Ahn Jeong-hun, Park Yu-ri, and Choi Jong-ho)	2021	Imitation OST
"Mini Date" (미니데이트) (with Kim Min-seo) (Note: As Leehyun with Riah.)	2021	Imitation OST
"Your Sign" (별자리) (with Lee Jun-young, Kang Chan-hee, Ahn Jeong-hun, Park Yu-ri, Choi Jong-ho, Jung Ji-so, Kim Min-seo, Lim Na-young, Jeong Yun-ho, Lee Su-woong, Park Seong-hwa, Choi San, and Park Ji-yeon) (Note: As Leehyun with members of Shax, Tea Party, Sparkling, and La Ri-ma.)	2021	Imitation OST
"Milky Way" (with Chani and Kang Min-ah)	2022	Miracle OST

== Filmography ==
=== Television series ===
Year	Title	Role	Notes
2018	Coffee Society 4.0	Jhoo	Cameo (Ep.8) (Thailand)
2020	Was It Love?	Hwiyoung	SF9 cameo (Ep.6)
2021	Imitation	Kang Leehyun	Support role (Shax member)
2023	The Matchmakers	Lee Jwarang	Support role

=== Web series ===
Year	Title	Role	Notes
2016	Click Your Heart	Hwiyoung	SF9 debut drama
2018	Dingo K-Drama	Hwiyoung	Support role
2020	Dok Go Bin is Updating	Dok Gobin	Main role
2020	Mermaid Prince: The Beginning	Yoon Gun	Main role
2021	Replay: The Moment	Lee Jihoon	Main role
2022	Miracle	Min Shiwoo	Main role
