= Twilight Out of Focus =

Japanese manga series

- First tankōbon volume cover

黄昏アウトフォーカス (Tasogare Auto Fōkasu)
- Genre: Yaoi
- Manga
- Written by: Jyanome
- Published by: Kodansha
- English publisher: NA: Kodansha USA
- Imprint: Honey Milk Comics
- Magazine: Honey Milk
- Original run: June 10, 2018 – present List of titles: Twilight Out of Focus June 10, 2018 – March 10, 2019; Overlap May 10, 2019 – August 10, 2020; Afterimages in Slow Motion December 10, 2019 – May 10, 2020; The Evening Monologues December 10, 2020 – June 10, 2021; Long Take August 10, 2022 – present; Afterimages in Slow Motion 2 June 10, 2024 – present
- Volumes: 7
- Anime television series
- Directed by: Toshinori Watabe
- Written by: Yoshimi Narita
- Music by: Satoshi Hōno; Kaori Nakano
- Studio: Studio Deen
- Licensed by: Crunchyroll (streaming); EA/SEA: Medialink
- Original network: Tokyo MX, BS Fuji, HTB, AT-X
- Original run: July 4, 2024 – September 19, 2024
- Episodes: 12

Twilight Out of Focus (黄昏アウトフォーカス, Tasogare Auto Fōkasu) is a Japanese manga series written and illustrated by Jyanome. It began serialization on Kodansha's digital BL magazine Honey Milk in June 2018. The series consists of five parts, three of which are part of the main story, and the other two parts being spin-off content. An anime television series adaptation produced by Studio Deen aired from July to September 2024.

== Plot ==
Despite a rocky start to their relationship, second-year high school students Mao Tsuchiya and Hisashi Otomo have managed to find a way to coexist in their dorm room for another year. The roommates swear to abide by three simple promises: Mao must refrain from outing Otomo as gay and having a boyfriend; Otomo, in turn, must not fall in love with Mao; and the two must respect each other's privacy when one of them "needs time to himself". While these are simple asks, the school's film club's new project suddenly puts them at risk.

The club's short film for the year is a boys' love story between a class president and a delinquent—a role for which Otomo is considered the perfect fit. As the principal photographer in charge of composing every scene, Mao oversees all of the intimate moments between the leads, and though he wishes he could deny it, his growing attraction to his roommate is affecting the movie's production. But as things start to intensify—both in the film and in his personal life—Mao is soon forced to confront these complex emotions head-on.

== Characters ==
Mao Tsuchiya (土屋 真央, Tsuchiya Mao)
Voiced by: Yoshitsugu Matsuoka (Japanese); Eduardo Vildasol (English)
Hisashi Otomo (大友 寿, Ōtomo Hisashi)
Voiced by: Yuma Uchida (Japanese); Joshua Waters (English)
Jin Kikuchihara (菊地原 仁, Kikuchihara Jin)
Voiced by: Makoto Furukawa (Japanese); Reagan Murdock (English)
Giichi Ichikawa (市川 義一, Ichikawa Giichi)
Voiced by: Masatomo Nakazawa (Japanese); Ben Stegmair (English)
Rei Inaba (稲葉 礼, Inaba Rei)
Voiced by: Takuya Eguchi (Japanese); Oscar Seung (English)
Shion Yoshino (吉乃 詩音, Yoshino Shion)
Voiced by: Soma Saito (Japanese); Landon McDonald (English)
Runa Kagari (加賀利 ルナ, Kagari Runa)
Voiced by: Aoi Ichikawa (Japanese); Rudy Lopez (English)
Teru Kagari (加賀利 テル, Kagari Teru)
Voiced by: Kōhei Yanagi (Japanese); Rudy Lopez (English)
Yukitaka Honjō (本條 雪孝, Honjō Yukitaka)
Voiced by: Takeo Ōtsuka (Japanese); Branden Loera (English)
Minoru Chiaki (千秋 実, Chiaki Minoru)
Voiced by: Gen Satō (Japanese); Kiba Walker (English)
Isao Tsuchiya (土谷 功緒, Tsuchiya Isao)
Voiced by: Hinata Tadokoro (Japanese); Conner Allison (English)
Rudy (ルディ, Rudi)
Voiced by: Yasuaki Takumi (Japanese); Abi Kumar (English)
Kirito Kujō (九条 桐斗, Kujō Kirito)
Voiced by: Kent Itō (Japanese); Sean Letourneau (English)

== Media ==
=== Manga ===
Written and illustrated by Jyanome, Twilight Out of Focus is serialized on Kodansha's digital BL magazine Honey Milk. The first part, Twilight Out of Focus, was serialized from June 10, 2018, to March 10, 2019. It was collected in a single tankōbon volume in June 2019. The second part, Twilight Out of Focus 3: Overlap, which continues the story in the first part was serialized from May 10, 2019, to August 10, 2020. It was collected in a single tankōbon volume in August 2020. The third part, Twilight Out of Focus 5: Long Take, began serialization on August 10, 2022. It has been collected in two tankōbon volumes as of May 2024.

A spin-off manga, titled Twilight Out of Focus 2: Afterimages in Slow Motion was serialized between December 10, 2019, and May 10, 2020. It was collected in a single tankōbon volume in July 2020. A second part began serialization on June 10, 2024.

Another spin-off manga, titled Twilight Out of Focus 4: The Evening Monologues, was serialized between December 10, 2020, and June 10, 2021. It was collected in a single tankōbon volume in June 2021.

In March 2022, Kodansha USA announced that they licensed the series for English digital publication. At Anime Expo 2022, Kodansha USA announced that they licensed the series for English print publication.

No.	Title	Original release date	English release date
1	Twilight Out of Focus; Tasogare Autofōkasu (黄昏アウトフォーカス)	June 14, 2019; 978-4-06-516066-4	March 1, 2022 (digital); May 9, 2023 (print); 978-1-64-729233-1
2	Twilight Out of Focus 2: Afterimages in Slow Motion; Zanzō Surō Mōshon (残像スローモーション)	July 10, 2020; 978-4-06-520011-7	July 11, 2023; 978-1-64-729235-5
3	Twilight Out of Focus 3: Overlap; Tasogare Autofōkasu Ōbārappu (黄昏アウトフォーカス overlap)	August 12, 2020; 978-4-06-520603-4	September 19, 2023 (digital); October 24, 2023 (print); 978-1-64-729234-8
4	Twilight Out of Focus 4: The Evening Monologues; Yoiyoi Monorōgu (宵々モノローグ)	June 15, 2021; 978-4-06-524126-4	December 19, 2023 (digital); January 16, 2024 (print); 978-1-64-729236-2
5	Twilight Out of Focus 5: Long Take Part 1 Tasogare Autofōkasu long take 1 (黄昏アウトフォーカス long take 1)	July 12, 2023; 978-4-06-532618-3	September 17, 2024; 978-1-64-729397-0
6	Twilight Out of Focus 6: Long Take Part 2 Tasogare Autofōkasu long take 2 (黄昏アウトフォーカス long take 2)	May 14, 2024; 978-4-06-534675-4	February 18, 2025; 978-1-64-729441-0
7	Twilight Out of Focus 7: Afterimages in Slow Motion 2 Zanzō Surō Mōshon (2) (残像スローモーション(2))	April 14, 2025; 978-4-06-539195-2	November 3, 2026; 978-1-64-729649-0
8	Twilight Out of Focus 8: Afterimages in Slow Motion 3 Zanzō Surō Mōshon (3) (残像スローモーション(3))	March 12, 2026; 978-4-06-541747-8	—

=== Anime ===
An anime television series adaptation was announced in July 2023. It is produced by Studio Deen and directed by Toshinori Watanabe, with Yoshimi Narita in charge of series composition, Yoko Kikuchi designing the characters, and Satoshi Hōno and Kaori Nakano composing the music. The series aired from July 4 to September 19, 2024, on Tokyo MX and other networks. The opening theme song is "Crank Up" performed by Ikusaburo Yamazaki, while the ending theme song is "Unchain×Unchain" performed by Amber's. Crunchyroll streamed the series. Medialink licensed the series for streaming in East and Southeast Asia on its Ani-One Asia YouTube channel.

==== Episodes ====
No.	Title	Directed by (Note: Production staff information is taken from the ending credits of each episode.)	Written by	Storyboarded by	Original release date
1	"If This Love Is Going to be Over Before It Even Begins"; Transliteration: "Hajimaru Mae ni Owaru Koi Nanka" (Japanese: 始まる前に終わる恋なんか)	Toshinori Watanabe	Yoshimi Narita	Toshinori Watanabe	July 4, 2024
2	"Pick Me"; Transliteration: "Ore ni Shinayo" (Japanese: 俺にしなよ)	Naoki Murata	Yoshimi Narita	Toshinori Watanabe	July 11, 2024
3	"Our Feelings Aren't Always Pretty"; Transliteration: "Kireina Dake Janai Kimochi" (Japanese: きれいなだけじゃない気持ち)	Masahiko Watanabe	Yoshimi Narita	Toshinori Watanabe	July 18, 2024
4	"Like the Movies"; Transliteration: "Eiga Mitai ni" (Japanese: 映画みたいに)	Toshinori Watanabe	Yoshimi Narita	Toshinori Watanabe	July 25, 2024
5	"Kikuchihara Jin's Troubles"; Transliteration: "Kikuchihara Jin no Nayami" (Japanese: 菊地原仁の悩み)	Ema Kaneko	Misaki Morie	Kiyotaka Ohata	August 1, 2024
6	"Kikuchihara Jin's First Love"; Transliteration: "Kikuchihara Jin no Hatsukoi" (Japanese: 菊地原仁の初恋)	Naoki Murata	Misaki Morie	Kiyotaka Ohata	August 8, 2024
7	"Settle The Feud"; Transliteration: "In'nen no Ketchaku" (Japanese: 因縁の決着)	Toshinori Watanabe	Misaki Morie	Toshinori Watanabe	August 15, 2024
8	"A Real Trashy Boyfriend"; Transliteration: "Do Kuzuna Kareshi" (Japanese: どクズな彼氏)	Masahiko Watanabe	Yoshimi Narita	Toshinori Watanabe	August 22, 2024
9	"You Should Want to See Me More"; Transliteration: "Motto Aitagatte Yo" (Japanese: もっと会いたがってよっ)	Naoki Murata	Yoshimi Narita	Toshinori Watanabe	August 29, 2024
10	"Promise Me This Is Forever"; Transliteration: "Eien Datte Chikatteyo" (Japanese: 永遠だって誓ってよ)	Toshinori Watanabe	Misaki Morie	Toshinori Watanabe	September 5, 2024
11	"Paths"; Transliteration: "Shinro" (Japanese: 進路)	Masahiko Watanabe	Yoshimi Narita	Toshinori Watanabe	September 12, 2024
12	"A Red Thread"; Transliteration: "Akai Ito" (Japanese: 赤い糸)	Toshinori Watanabe	Yoshimi Narita	Toshinori Watanabe	September 19, 2024

== Controversy ==
Crunchyroll, the streaming service that carries the international simulcast rights to the anime series, removed its comment section across the entire platform to "reduce harmful content", presumably in response to the heavy review bombing the anime was receiving.
