= Imitation (TV series) =

2021 South Korean television series

- Promotional poster
- Hangul: 이미테이션
- RR: Imiteisyeon
- MR: Imit'eisyŏn
- Genre: Drama
- Created by: Kakao Entertainment; KBS Drama Production
- Based on: Imitation by Park Kyung-ran
- Written by: Choi Sun-young; Kim Min-jung
- Directed by: Han Hyun-hee
- Starring: Jung Ji-so; Lee Jun-young; Jeong Yun-ho; Park Ji-yeon
- Country of origin: South Korea
- Original language: Korean
- No. of episodes: 12

Production
- Producers: Lee Jae-moon; Ma Jeong-hoon
- Running time: 60 minutes
- Production company: Hidden Sequence

Original release
- Network: KBS2
- Release: May 7 – July 23, 2021

Imitation (Korean: 이미테이션; RR: Imiteisyeon) is a South Korean television series starring Jung Ji-so, Lee Jun-young, Jeong Yun-ho, and Park Ji-yeon. Based on the webtoon of the same name, it tells the story of the lives of idols in the entertainment industry, centered around the secret romance between a member of a rookie girl group and a member of the top boy group in the industry. The series aired on KBS2 from May 7, 2021, to July 23, 2021. The drama was aired on Rakuten Viki Originals and iQiyi in selected regions.

== Synopsis ==
After her dreams of debuting as an idol are dashed due to a tragic incident involving the former member of her group at her entertainment company, Lee Ma-ha (Jung Ji-so) supports herself by impersonating the solo singer La Ri-ma (Park Ji-yeon) at cheap events. She and the members of Omega III are given a second chance at stardom when Ji Hak (Danny Ahn), the former manager of the famed boy band Shax, recruits them to rebrand as his new girl group, Tea Party. Ma-ha suddenly finds herself thrust into the spotlight, using her La Ri-ma impression to gain Tea Party attention from the public—both positive and negative.

Ma-ha repeatedly encounters Kwon Ryok (Lee Jun-young), Shax's most popular member, at various idol events. Despite his successful career, Ryok is still haunted by the disappearance of group member Lee Eun-jo (Kang Chan-hee) during a concert three years prior. While initially annoyed by Ma-ha, he develops feelings for her and they start a secret relationship that puts their careers at risk. Lee Yu-jin (Jeong Yun-ho), Ma-ha's close friend and fellow idol, notices their budding romance and is determined to protect Ma-ha from Ryok and lead his own group, Sparkling, to dethrone Shax as the top boy band in the industry.

== Cast ==
=== Main ===
- Jung Ji-so as Lee Ma-ha

The center of the new girl group Tea Party, who is best known for her impersonation of the solo artist La Ri-ma. Originally a trainee at Music Holic, she was persuaded to join Omega Entertainment after a member of their upcoming girl group suddenly dropped out. However, the group's debut was cancelled, and Ma-ha spent three years doing odd jobs to support herself before getting her second chance with Tea Party. She is determined to succeed no matter what, even when her attempts to gain popularity make her the subject of severe online hate. Through her idol work, she frequently crosses paths with Shax member Kwon Ryok, and she begins to fall for him despite rules forbidding idols to date.

- Lee Jun-young as Kwon Ryok

The charming center and most popular member of the top boy band Shax, which debuted six years ago under NOG Entertainment. He is known for his strong personality, performance skills, and star quality; however, he is still deeply affected by the disappearance of his best friend Eun-jo three years ago. He pretends to be the same charismatic figure he once was, but it is all an act for the cameras. Ryok cares deeply for the remaining Shax members and does everything he can to ensure the group's continued success in spite of his own pain. He first met Ma-ha prior to his debut with Shax, mentoring her in dance. Once she becomes an idol, their paths cross again, but he dislikes her due to her impersonations of La Ri-ma. However, his opinions begin to shift as they grow closer, and he becomes willing to risk everything to date her.

- Park Ji-yeon as La Ri-ma

A popular solo singer considered one of the most iconic idols in the industry, known for her powerful, sophisticated performances. Once a trainee at NOG Entertainment, she left after Ji Hak suggested that she use her skills to become a soloist instead of joining a girl group. She has embraced the image of a celebrity from a young age, but often finds herself lonely as a result of her lifestyle. Her only close friendship is with Ryok, and she becomes concerned and threatened when Ma-ha's presence in his life begins to grow stronger. Offended by Ma-ha's impersonations of her and worried about losing Ryok, Ri-ma tries to find ways to humiliate Ma-ha and drive the two apart.

- Jeong Yun-ho as Lee Yu-jin

The main vocalist and center of the rising boy band Sparkling, who hides his ambition and persistence behind his outwardly soft and charming image. He trained at Music Holic alongside Ma-ha and they have been close friends for years. He always goes out of his way to be there for Ma-ha when she is struggling and has harbored a secret crush on her since their trainee days. When he notices that Ma-ha is falling for Ryok, his competitive side comes to the surface. He begins to see Ryok as his rival and becomes determined to lead Sparkling to dethrone Shax as the top boy group in the industry.

=== Supporting ===
==== Tea Party ====
- Lim Na-young as Shim Hyun-ji

The group's main visual. She has an obvious crush on Yu-jin, but he does not notice due to his infatuation with Ma-ha.

- Kim Min-seo as Yu Ri-ah

The main vocalist and leader of Tea Party. She has a chic, cool attitude and is always looking out for her group-mates. She develops feelings for Lee-hyun after he asks to collaborate with her on a song.

- Danny Ahn as Ji Hak

Tea Party's creator and the founder of JH Entertainment. Once the well-respected manager of Shax, he resigned after Eun-jo's disappearance and restarted his life as a café owner. After three years, he unexpectedly returns to the entertainment industry with Tea Party, determined to make them a top idol group. He has an unknown connection to Annie, a late Omega Entertainment trainee.

==== Shax ====
- Kang Chan-hee as Lee Eun-jo

A former Shax member who was Ryok's best friend and rival. He suddenly disappeared during a concert three years ago, though the news was overshadowed by the suicide of Annie on the same night. His disappearance deeply hurt the other Shax members and led to Ji Hak's resignation from NOG Entertainment. Ryok and Ji Hak are frequently haunted by his memory, and his unexpected return brings unknown secrets to light.

- Ahn Jeong-hun as Han Jae-woo

A vocalist who is the leader and "mom" of Shax. After Eun-jo disappears, he becomes more mature and protective of the remaining Shax members.

- Yuri Park as Bang Do-jin

A rapper who is known for his eccentric personality. As a foreigner, he sometimes struggles to understand Korean phrases. He is closest to Hyuk, who he enlists to help him uncover the true nature of Ryok's relationship with Ma-ha when he suspects something between them.

- Hwiyoung as Kang Lee-hyun

A rapper and producer. He was persuaded to join Shax due to his idol-like looks, but only cares about creating music. He falls for Ri-ah after hearing her sing.

- Choi Jong-ho as Yoon Hyuk

Shax's youngest member and main vocalist. Having begun idol training at an early age, he was raised largely by his group-mates. He is greedy for their attention and acts out when ignored, but tries to keep the group cheerful after Eun-jo's disappearance. He assists Do-jin in figuring out Ryok and Ma-ha's relationship.

- Oh Hee-joon as Koo Dae-kwon

Shax's dedicated manager who is overworked between managing the group and Ryok's acting career. He cares deeply about maintaining Shax's reputation.

==== Sparkling ====
- Lee Su-woong as Kim Hyun-oh

The group's eldest member and former center. After losing the center position to Yu-jin, Hyun-oh grows cold and judgmental towards him. He vigilantly waits for opportunities to bring Yu-jin down. He was supposed to debut in SHAX.

- Park Seong-hwa as Nam Se-young

A rapper and Sparkling's leader, known as a "hidden gem" amongst Sparkling fans, whose blunt personality keeps Hyun-oh in check.

- Choi San as Son Min-soo

The youngest member, who is well known amongst idol fans for his vibrant pink hair. He is always loyal to Yu-jin. Also known for having weak control of his bowels. In episode 4, group member Seyoung uses the bathroom after Minsoo, only to find it completely befouled. Minsoo reveals he is lactose intolerant in episode 7.

- Shin Soo-ho as Tae-geun

Sparkling's manager who admires Ji Hak's work and assists him when needed. He is burdened with making Sparkling a success, and disdains Yu-jin's closeness with Ma-ha as a result.

==== NOG Entertainment ====
- Gong Jung-hwan as Park Jin-man

The CEO of NOG Entertainment who dominates the idol industry with his intense business strategies. Following Eun-jo's disappearance, he makes sure to keep Shax on top, though he is privately considering the perfect time to bring the group down and push up a new one in their place. He has a secret contract with Ryok. When Tea Party debuts, he tries to hurt their reputation and spite Ji Hak.

- Lee Tae-hyung as Department Head Kim

CEO Park's second-in-command who handles all of his behind-the-scenes tasks.

==== Others ====
- Shim Eun-jin as Byun Jung-hee

A reporter who runs the celebrity newspaper "Fact Check," who is determined to uncover the truth behind Eun-jo's disappearance and all of Shax's scandals.

- Yeon Si-woo as Annie / Jang Yu-ri

A late Omega Entertainment trainee with an unknown connection to Ji Hak. She committed suicide by jumping into the Han River, the same night Shax's Eun-jo disappeared during a concert. Her death was used by NOG Entertainment executives to distract the media from Eun-jo's disappearance.

- Jo Jung-chi as Kim Ha-seok / Ammonite

A composer who is Lee-hyun's mentor and Tea Party's producer.

- Kim Ji-sook as Eun-jin

A talented stylist who works with Shax and Tea Party.

- Nam Jung-woo as Go Ba-wi

Omega III's manager, who unofficially manages Ma-ha after the group disbands.

- Choi So-yoon as So-yoon

The executive of Shax's fan club.

- Lee Hwi-seo as Tae-ri

A Shax fan club member who assists So-yoon.

=== Special appearances ===
- Yoon Jung-sub as a movie studio staff member (Ep. 1, 4–6)
- Jang Won-young as the CEO of Omega Entertainment (Ep. 1, 8)
- Jo Mo-se as a Music Holic staff member (Ep. 1)
- Kim Jae-il as the CEO of Music Holic (Ep. 1, 3)
- Sung Hyuk as a best new actor nominee (Ep. 1)
- 3YE as themselves (Ep. 2, 3)
- Park Kyung-lim as Broadcast Program Host (Ep. 2)
- Jeon Ji-soo as La Ri-ma's manager (Ep. 2, 3, 4)
- Joo Young-hoon as F Reze (Ep. 3, 4)
- Shim Yu-seung as the Music Arena director (Ep. 4)
- Seo Ji-hoon as Yoon Bin (Ep. 8)
- Yoon Yoo-sun as Lee Ma-ha's mother

== Episodes ==
No.	Title	Directed by	Written by	Original release date
1	"Episode 1"	Han Hyun-hee	Choi Sun-young, Kim Min-jung	May 7, 2021
Three years before the main events of the story, idol trainee Lee Ma-ha's dream of debuting in a girl group is cut short when news of a fellow trainee Annie who had committed suicide breaks out and disturbs the K-pop industry. Elsewhere, the comeback of popular boy group Shax kicks off with a rough start as Kwon Ryok is forced to cover for a co-member Lee Eun-jo who suddenly goes missing. At the present time, Ma-ha struggles to support herself by impersonating the famous solo artist La Ri-ma while Shax has become the most popular group in the industry, with Ryok developing a successful acting career.
2	"Episode 2"	Han Hyun-hee	Choi Sun-young, Kim Min-jung	May 14, 2021
After an eventful movie shoot, Ma-ha chooses to quit pursuing idol stardom and start a new life, a decision seconded by her teammates Yu Ri-ah and Shim Hyun-ji. In a press conference, reporter Byun Jung-hee causes a stir by questioning Shax about Eun-jo whose disappearance has already caused an emotional toll on Ryok. Meanwhile, Shax's ex-manager Ji Hak returns to the K-pop industry and decides to manage Ma-ha, Ri-ah and Hyun-ji. The trio changes their minds, resolves to accept Ji Hak's offer and adopts the group name "Tea Party." Ji Hak starts implementing his unorthodox way in managing an idol group.
3	"Episode 3"	Han Hyun-hee	Choi Sun-young, Kim Min-jung	May 21, 2021
Controversy is stirred amongst Shax fans when Ma-ha is photographed returning Ryok's jacket to him after a television shoot. Ryok is forced to apologize to fans, who brazenly demand Shax avoid Ri-ma and Ma-ha at all costs. In a meeting with her CEO, Ri-ma threatens to end her contract if she does not get to record a duet with Ryok. Meanwhile, Tea Party work to find their perfect debut single as Ji Hak prepares for their first appearance on a music show. Elsewhere, Ma-ha's best friend Lee Yu-jin prepares a comeback with his own group, Sparkling, but he is troubled by Ma-ha's interactions with Ryok.
4	"Episode 4"	Han Hyun-hee	Choi Sun-young, Kim Min-jung	May 28, 2021
Shax's CEO Park Jin-man forces the group to appear on a music show, despite their pledge to do otherwise for their juniors' sakes. The move leads junior artists, including Tea Party, to have shorter screentimes. Yu-jin confronts Ryok about the situation and is chastised for being rude to a senior in the industry. However, Tea Party earns a taste of popularity after skillfully performing their debut single a cappella when a technical glitch cuts out their music. Ma-ha fills in the vacated female lead role in a film Ryok is starring in and joins in a tour across major cities to promote the film's premiere.
5	"Episode 5"	Han Hyun-hee	Choi Sun-young, Kim Min-jung	June 4, 2021
During the film promotion tour, Ma-ha and Ryok find themselves in a tight spot as Shax's sasaeng fans storm the halls of their accommodation. Ji Hak is confronted by Jung-hee who is investigating Eun-jo's disappearance and Ji Hak's connection to the late idol trainee Annie, whom she suspects to have been Eun-jo's girlfriend. Elsewhere, Yu-jin and Hyun-ji do a photoshoot together while Ri-ah rejects a request from Shax's Lee-hyun to collaborate on a song. While forced to read more film and TV drama scripts, Ryok recruits his bandmates Do-jin and Hyuk to help him understand his developing feelings towards Ma-ha.
6	"Episode 6"	Han Hyun-hee	Choi Sun-young, Kim Min-jung	June 11, 2021
Ryok visits Ma-ha outside of her apartment but is chased off by Hyun-ji and Ri-ah. Ma-ha is cast for a sitcom along with Ryok's co-members Do-jin and Hyuk. Ryok is forced to accept another role in an action film right after finishing a countryside shooting for a reality show. Ryok's co-members Do-jin and Hyuk help him sneak out to visit Ma-ha but are caught by Shax's leader Jae-woo. Ma-ha, Hyun-ji, and Ri-ah visit the set of Ryok's new film where Yu-jin has a supporting role. Ma-ha unwittingly distracts Ryok with her arrival, causing him to crash his car in the midst of the shooting.
7	"Episode 7"	Han Hyun-hee	Choi Sun-young, Kim Min-jung	June 18, 2021
Ryok does not sustain any serious injuries from the accident, but his hospitalization allows him to compensate on his lack of sleep due to his tight schedule. Shax's manager Dae-kwon apologizes to Ryok for making him overwork and promises that he will do anything he asks. Dae-kwon, Do-jin and Hyuk arrange a secret meeting at the hospital between Ryok and the unknowing Ma-ha who bursts into tears upon arrival. Ma-ha and Ryok confess their feelings for each other. Upon his recovery, Ryok receives a warm welcome from his co-members, while Lee-hyun opens up to Ryok about his feelings for Ri-ah. Later, Ryok takes Ma-ha on a nighttime date in a mountain.
8	"Episode 8"	Han Hyun-hee	Choi Sun-young, Kim Min-jung	June 25, 2021
Unbeknownst to Ma-ha and Ryok, a paparazzo has taken photos of them and has decided to spy on the couple. After finding out that Ma-ha will be shooting kissing scenes for the sitcom, Ryok visits the set with a food truck but can barely contain his jealousy while watching Ma-ha's kissing scene. Later, the paparazzo reveals Ryok and Ma-ha's secret dating to CEO Park, who then convinces Tea Party's former boss to file a trumped-up breach of contract lawsuit against the trio. Ma-ha and Ryok learn that their secret relationship has been exposed. While Ji Hak and Tea Party brace themselves for the lawsuit, Ryok resorts to a difficult decision.
9	"Episode 9"	Han Hyun-hee	Unknown	July 2, 2021
Ji Hak hires Go Ba Wi to manage Tea Party. To drown his sorrows, Kwon Ryok throws himself into his work while Ma-ha prefers to focus on her career and just be his fan. Ji Hak asks Byun Jung-hee to write an article about the lawsuit which results in the suit being dropped. Ji Hak and the girls celebrate and get back to work. Yu-jin and Hyun-ji become a couple. Ryok gets into a fight with cold-hearted Hyun-Oh and Park Jin-man punishes him by making him appear on the YMSA game show along with Hyuk and Do-jin, Ri-ma and members of Sparkling and Tea Party.
10	"Episode 10"	Han Hyun-hee	Unknown	July 9, 2021
The YSMA game show: Ryok is paired with Ri-ma, Ma-ha chooses Yu-jin, and Hyuk and Do-jin are pared for song-dance routines. Lee Hyun and Ri-ah sing together when her original partner is in an accident. [All great performances!] NOG acquires Music Holic and Queen Entertainment and Ri-ma fires the latter as her management company. Ma-ha goes home for a visit and Ryok follows her.
11	"Episode 11"	Han Hyun-hee	Unknown	July 16, 2021
Ri-ma and Queen Entertainment's trainees sign with Ji Hak and JH Entertainment. Ryok discovers Ma-ha has Annie's phone which is the same as Eun-jo's phone that he dropped the night he disappeared (couple phones). He finally realizes Eun-jo and Annie were dating and that he disappeared the day she died. After Ryok and Ma-ha figure out the password on the two phones, the truth of what happened to Annie finally comes out. Ryok and Eun-jo meet and have a good talk then say goodbye. Ryok declares his love to Ma-ha and is determined they will make it. Tea Party gets invited to MML.
12	"Episode 12"	Han Hyun-hee	Unknown	July 23, 2021
Shax, Sparkling, Ri-ma, and Tea Party all prepare to perform Eun-jo and Annie's song at MML. At MML, each group performs their own song and dance routines then they all come together for the finale to sing Eun-jo and Annie's song. Eun-jo appears on stage with them in the end. Shax leaves NOG and Park Jin-man. It appears that everyone joins JH Entertainment in the end. They all meet in Ji Hak's restaurant.

== Production ==
In October 2020, it was announced that the popular webtoon by Park Kyung-ran Imitation would be made into a television series with Jung Ji-so, Lee Jun-young, Park Ji-yeon, and Jeong Yun-ho in lead roles. Imitation marks director Han Hyun-hee and screenwriters Choi Sun-young and Kim Min-jung's second collaboration after Rookie Historian Goo Hae-ryung (2019). In March 2021, it was announced that Imitation would be moving its first air date up from late May to the beginning of the month, in order to fill the empty time-slot left by the indefinite postponement of the drama Dear.M.

=== Promotion ===
As part of the program's promotional campaign KBS created social media accounts on Instagram and Twitter for Shax, Sparkling, and Tea Party, posting photos, interviews, and other special content related to the characters, as though they were real groups. The posts sometimes reference events that occur in recent episodes of the show. Additionally, the actors portraying members of Tea Party and Shax were slated to perform and be interviewed on Music Bank in-character, promoting their singles "Show Me" and "Malo" respectively. Each of the three groups, as well as the character La Ri-ma, are set to release individual mini-albums of their in-show songs.

== Original soundtrack ==
Imitation: Original Soundtrack

Soundtrack album by Various artists
- Genres: Soundtrack; K-pop
- Language: Korean
- Label: VLENDING

=== Singles ===
The following is the track list of singles from Imitation: Original Soundtrack.

Malo (Imitation X Shax)

Released on May 7, 2021
No.	Title	Lyrics	Music	Artist	Length
1.	"Malo"	Park Sung-il, FRAKTAL	Park Sung-il, FRAKTAL	Shax (Note: Performed by Lee Jun-young, Kang Chan-hee, Ahn Jeong-hun, Park Yu-ri, Hwiyoung and Choi Jong-ho)	2:58
2.	"Malo" (Inst.)		Park Sung-il, FRAKTAL		2:58
Total length:					5:56

Call Me (8282119) (Imitation X Omega III)

Released on May 8, 2021
No.	Title	Lyrics	Music	Artist	Length
1.	"Call Me (8282119)"	Park Sung-il, FRAKTAL	Park Sung-il, FRAKTAL	Omega III (Note: Performed by Jung Ji-so, Kim Min-seo and Lim Na-young)	3:11
2.	"Call Me (8282119)" (Inst.)		Park Sung-il, FRAKTAL		3:11
Total length:					6:22

No Answer (Imitation X La Lima)

Released on May 14, 2021
No.	Title	Lyrics	Music	Artist	Length
1.	"No Answer" (답답해, lit. "Frustrated")	Park Sung-il, FRAKTAL	Park Sung-il, FRAKTAL	La Ri-ma (Note: Performed by Park Ji-yeon)	3:21
2.	"No Answer" (Inst.)		Park Sung-il, FRAKTAL		3:21
Total length:					6:42

Show Me (Imitation X Tea Party)

Released on May 21, 2021
No.	Title	Lyrics	Music	Artist	Length
1.	"Show Me"	Park Sung-il, FRAKTAL	Park Sung-il, FRAKTAL	Tea Party	3:26
2.	"Show Me" (Inst.)		Park Sung-il, FRAKTAL		3:26
Total length:					6:52

Diamond (Imitation X Sparkling)

Released on May 28, 2021
No.	Title	Lyrics	Music	Artist	Length
1.	"Diamond"	Jung So-yeon	WuRa Tang Tang	Sparkling (Note: Performed by Jeong Yun-ho, Lee Su-woong, Park Seong-hwa and Choi San)	3:26
2.	"Diamond" (Inst.)		WuRa Tang Tang		3:26
Total length:					6:52

If We Were (Imitation X Maha)

Released on June 25, 2021
No.	Title	Lyrics	Music	Artist	Length
1.	"If We Were" (만약에 우리 둘 중 하나라도, lit. "If Either of Us")	Park Sung-il	Park Sung-il	Maha (Tea Party) (Note: Performed by Jung Ji-so)	4:30
2.	"If We Were" (Inst.)		Park Sung-il		4:30
Total length:					9:00

== Reception ==
=== Commercial performance ===
With 0.8% ratings, Imitation recorded lowest ratings for KBS2's drama, tied with 2020 drama Welcome, and second lowest overall for free TV behind MBC's Dae Jang Geum Is Watching with 0.7% in 2018. On the 6th episode Imitation recorded 0.4% ratings, the lowest of all time.

The drama, however, was well-received with the international audience. It received a rating of 9.5 on its online streaming service Rakuten Viki and ranked amongst the most popular dramas on the platform during its two-month run.

=== Ratings ===
Average TV viewership ratings
Ep.	Part	Original broadcast date	Average audience share (Nielsen Korea)
Ep.	Part	Original broadcast date	Nationwide
1	1	May 7, 2021	1.0%
1	2	May 7, 2021	0.9%
2	1	May 14, 2021	0.8%
2	2	May 14, 2021	1.1%
3	1	May 21, 2021	0.8%
3	2	May 21, 2021	0.8%
4	1	May 28, 2021	1.0%
4	2	May 28, 2021	0.7%
5	1	June 4, 2021	1.1%
5	2	June 4, 2021	0.8%
6	1	June 11, 2021	0.7%
6	2	June 11, 2021	0.4%
7	1	June 18, 2021	0.6%
7	2	June 18, 2021	0.9%
8	1	June 25, 2021	1.3%
8	2	June 25, 2021	1.1%
9		July 2, 2021	1.0%
10		July 9, 2021	1.0%
11		July 16, 2021	0.5%
12		July 23, 2021	1.2%
Average			0.885%

- In the table above, the blue numbers represent the lowest ratings and the red numbers represent the highest ratings.

== Accolades ==
=== Awards and nominations ===
Name of the award ceremony, year presented, category, nominee of the award, and the result of the nomination
Award ceremony	Year	Category	Nominee / Work	Result	Ref.
Seoul International Drama Awards	2022	Outstanding K-Pop Idol Actor	Yunho	Nominated	
Seoul International Drama Awards	2022	Outstanding K-Pop Idol Actor	San	Nominated	
Seoul International Drama Awards	2022	Outstanding K-Pop Idol Actor	Seonghwa	Nominated	
Seoul International Drama Awards	2022	Outstanding K-Pop Idol Actor	Jongho	Nominated	

=== Listicles ===
Name of publisher, year listed, name of listicle, and placement
Publisher	Year	Listicle	Placement	Ref.
CBR	2022	10 Best K-Dramas About The K-Pop Industry	3rd	
Aaficionados	2022	23 Best Dramas of 2021	11th	
