= True Beauty (webtoon) =

South Korean digital comic

- Cover art of the Young Com comic book edition (volume 1)

여신강림 RR: Yeosin gangnim MR: Yŏsin kangnim
- Genre: Romantic comedy; Slice of life; Coming-of-age
- Author: Yaongyi (Note: Korean: 야옹이; RR: Yaongi; lit. "Meow" (i.e. ideophone for a vocalization of cats))
- Illustrator: Yaongyi
- Publisher: Naver; Young Com
- English publisher: Naver
- Magazine: Naver Webtoon (original Korean); Webtoon (official English translation)
- Original run: April 2, 2018 – June 28, 2023

Television adaptation(s)
- Original net animation
- Studio: Studio N; Cocktail Media
- Licensed by: Crunchyroll (streaming); U-Next (streaming, in Japan only)
- Released: August 7, 2024 – present
- Episodes: 13

True Beauty (Korean: 여신강림; Hanja: 女神降臨; Korean pronunciation: [jʌɕʰinɡaːŋnim]; lit. The Advent of a Goddess), also known as The Secret of Angel and other names, is a South Korean manhwa written and illustrated by Yaongyi. First published in Naver Webtoon from April 2, 2018, to June 28, 2023, it centers on a young woman who mastered the art of makeup in her teenage years in order to transform herself into a gorgeous "goddess" after being bullied and discriminated because of being perceived as ugly.

As of January 2022, the official English version of True Beauty has accumulated 6.6 million subscribers and 825.9 million views. The comic updates every Wednesday. True Beauty was the third most viewed series on Webtoon in 2019 and a print version was released starting October 29, 2020 by Young Com. It was also adapted into a television series of the same name which premiered on tvN on December 9, 2020, and later received an aeni series of the same name which aired from August to October 2024 which can be seen on the streaming services Crunchyroll and U-Next. As of 2025, a second season has been announced.

== Plot ==
In her teenage years, Ju-kyung Lim has been treated unfairly by her family and bullied by her enemies due to being perceived as ugly. She starts learning how to use makeup by binge-watching tutorial videos on the Internet. She masters the art and her makeover proves to be gorgeously transformative as she quickly rises to fame and people become awed at the sight of her newfound beauty. Soon, she makes an unlikely relationship with two of the most handsome, most popular boys at school: Lee Su-ho, who is the first to recognize her beyond her makeup, and Han Seo-jun, a "bad boy" who is not on good terms with Suho. Living in a society where people are judged based on their physical appearance, Jugyeong navigates through her high school days and into her college life while struggling to keep her makeup-less face a secret and facing various challenges with her self-esteem, love life and career.

The plot of True Beauty can de subdivided into the following story arcs:

- Ju-kyung's high school story (Prologue, Chs. 1–58)
1. "The advent of a goddess": Ju-kyung learns and masters the makeup arts (Prologue, Chs. 1–3)
2. Suho recognizes Ju-kyung beyond her make-up (Chs. 4–10)
3. Soo-jin's plot against Ju-kyung (Chs. 11–16)
4. Ju-kyung meets Seo-jun and Aiden (Chs. 17–24)
5. Ju-kyung becomes Gowoon's makeup artist (Chs. 25–28)
6. The tragedy of Yoon Se-yeon; Su-ho and Seo-jun reconcile (Chs. 29–38)
7. The summer break with Suho and Seo-jun (Chs. 39–47)
8. The last year in high school and Suho's departure to Japan (Chs. 48–58)
- Into adulthood (Chs. 59-223)
1. Ju-kyung in college: life without Su-ho and falling in love with Seo-jun (Chs. 59–69)
2. Ju-kyung deals with her jealousy (Chs. 70–73)
3. Ju-kyung and Jin-su (Chs. 74–77)
4. Seo-jun's multiple part-time jobs and his overnight Internet stardom (Chs. 78–86)
5. Su-ho returns; Seo-jun recognizes Ju-kyung's bare face (Chs. 87–94)
6. Seo-jun returns to idol training, Ju-kyung works under Selena Lee (Chs. 95–99)
7. Ju-kyung deals with Seo-jun's jealousy (Chs. 100–109)
8. Ju-kyung, Su-ho, Seo-jun, and Aiden in Prince of Prince (Chs. 110–119)
9. Ju-kyung's struggle with dating an upcoming idol; Ju-kyung and Seo-jun's break-up (Chs. 120–128)
10. Ju-kyung and Seo-jun try to move on from their break-up (Chs. 129–135)
11. Ju-kyung and Eun-hye (Chs. 136–143)
12. Ju-kyung at the Lee Family's villa (Chs. 144–147)
13. Seo-jun's song dedicated to Ju-kyung (Chs. 148–150)
14. Soo-jin's ordeal with her abusive boyfriend (Chs. 151–158)
15. Soo-jin starts leading a new life, Su-ho and Seo-jun continue fighting over Ju-kyung (Chs. 159–165)
16. Da-jung's cheating boyfriend (Chs. 166–168)
17. Su-ho becomes Ju-kyung's boyfriend (Chs. 169–174)
18. Ju-kyung venturing into vlogging and her struggle against Jo Bo-jung (Chs. 175–185)
19. Su-ho and his father reconcile; Ju-kyung stands up to Bo-jung (Chs. 186–190)
20. Su-ho starts working as a cook under Mi-yeon; Ju-kyung helps Mi-yeon with her face scar (Chs. 191–194)
21. Ju-kyung and Seung-ho (Chs. 195–199)
22. Seo-jun suffered hardships in his career as an idol (Chs. 200–212)
23. Ju-kyung's bare face becomes exposed to the netizens (Chs. 213–217)
24. Ju-kyung runs away from home and finally learns to love her true self (Chs. 218–221)
25. Conclusion (Chs. 222–223)

== Characters ==
=== Main ===
The main characters of True Beauty. Upper row, left to right: Lim Ju-kyung without and with makeup. Lower row, left to right: Lee Su-ho and Han Seo-jun.
- Lim Ju-kyung

Voiced by: Jung Hye-won (Korean), Rebecca Danae (English), Hina Suguta (Japanese)
a 22-year-old make-up artist and social media influencer; Su-ho's wife and Seo-jun's ex-girlfriend; the protagonist of the webtoon. Ju-kyung is hooked on reading horror comic books and listening to heavy metal music. In her younger years, she bore the harsh consequences of not conforming to society's standards of beauty. In the family, she is treated less favorably over her two relatively good-looking siblings; at school, she is being bullied and is treated like an errand girl. Seeking solutions on the Internet, she discovers a plethora of makeup tutorial videos and she soon masters the art to effectively transforming herself into a gorgeous "goddess." Other than her family, the first two people who knew her real face were her boyfriend Su-ho, whom she had previously run into with her bare face a couple of times at a comic book store back in her high school years, and her ex-boyfriend Seo-jun.

- Lee Su-ho

Voiced by: Jang Min-hyeok (Korean), Eduardo Vildasol (English), Taito Ban (Japanese)
a 22-year-old third-generation Korean-Japanese who works as a cook and aspires for a career in culinary arts; Ju-kyung's husband and Seo-jun's best friend. Su-ho is the son of a famous Korean actor and a Japanese mother who is ethnically Korean but was born in Japan. Back in middle school, he became best friends with Seo-jun and Se-yeon, but after unintentionally ignoring Se-yeon moments before the latter's suicide, he becomes the object of Seo-jun's hostility. The immense guilt due to Se-yeon's death and the broken friendship with Seo-jun turns him into a cold and aloof boy who, unbeknownst to everybody, cannot sleep well and has also contemplated suicide. Sharing Ju-kyung's penchant for horror comic books, he sometimes runs into her inside a comic book store they both frequent and soon develops feelings for her. In high school, he is the first to recognize Ju-kyung beyond her makeup. He later reconciles with Seo-jun after opening up about what really happened to him on the day of Se-yeon's suicide. He then becomes Ju-kyung's husband.

- Han Seo-jun

Voiced by: Seo Ban-suk (Korean), Mauricio Ortiz-Segura (English), Hayato Dojima (Japanese)
a 22-year-old solo K-pop artist under ST Entertainment; Ju-kyung's ex-boyfriend and Su-ho's best friend. Back in middle school, Seo-jun became best friends with Su-ho and Se-yeon after he rescued them from bullies. He becomes an idol trainee after being convinced by Se-yeon who, along with Su-ho, discovered his talent in singing. After Se-yeon's suicide, he broke his friendship with Su-ho (they reconciled later on) and stopped pursuing idol stardom. In high school, he had a crush on Ju-kyung but did not pursue her because of the mutual feelings between Su-ho and Ju-kyung. When Su-ho left for Japan for a few years, he became Ju-kyung's boyfriend and he revived his idol training. He later reluctantly accepts Ju-kyung's wish to break up after Ju-kyung suffers from the pressure and online criticism associated with dating an upcoming idol.

=== Supporting ===
==== Ju-kyung's family ====
- Lim Hee-kyung

Ju-kyung and Ju-young's elder sister; an employee at ST Entertainment. Hee-kyung frequently goes home drunk after work. She is close to Ju-kyung.

- Lim Ju-young

Ju-kyung and Hee-kyung's younger brother.

- the Lim siblings' mother

she frequently discriminates against Ju-kyung over Hee-kyung and Ju-young, though deep inside she also loves Ju-kyung.

==== Saebom High School ====
- Kang Soo-ah

Ju-kyung's best friend who is an ardent fan of boy idol groups. Soo-ah is supportive and protective of Ju-kyung.

- Kang Soo-jin

a pretty social media celebrity who appears to despise Ju-kyung. Despite her perfect appearance, Soo-jin suffers from an alcoholic and abusive mother, a broken family, and an eating disorder.

- Ahn Chae-rin

a friend of Ju-kyung and Soo-ah.

- Han Joon-woo

a teacher at Saebom High School who went out on a date with Hee-kyung.

==== Seo-jun's family and friends ====
- Han Go-woon

a student of Saebom High School; Seo-jun's younger sister. Go-woon has great singing talent, but she is ridiculed by her co-members in the music club for being chosen to take the lead role in a musical despite being not pretty.

- the Han siblings' mother
- Lee Pil-soo

one of Seo-jun's friends.

- Wang Ji-hoon

one of Seo-jun's friends.

- Jessie

one of Seo-jun's friends; Pil-soo's girlfriend and owner of a clothes shop.

- Kim Aiden

a biracial member of K-pop boy group PVC; formerly a trainee under ST Entertainment; Seo-jun and Ju-kyung's friend.

==== Su-ho's family ====
- Lee Joo-heon

a famous actor who works in both South Korea and Japan; Su-ho's father. After his Japanese wife died of cancer, Joo-heon allegedly started dating a co-star behind his children's backs. His apparently secret relationship was discovered by Su-ho on the day of Se-yeon's suicide; due to mixed shock and indignation, Su-ho left home and unintentionally ignored Se-yeon's phone calls for help (which would be Se-yeon's last phone calls before his death).

- Lee Selena

a famous make-up artist whom Ju-kyung admires; Su-ho's elder sister.

==== College acquaintances ====
- Kim Jin-su

Ju-kyung's fellow film student who asked her for help in transforming his appearance to win Soo-jin's heart.

- Lee Ha-neul

Ju-kyung's senior who is excessively clingy to her.

- Ahn Hyeon-woo

a college student in industrial design who becomes Ju-kyung's groupmate in a class project.

==== ST Entertainment ====
- Shin Hee-yeon

a female K-pop idol under ST Entertainment who likes Seo-jun.

- Jeong Ji-hyuk

a male K-pop idol under ST Entertainment.

- Kim Yeong-bin

a male K-pop idol under ST Entertainment.

- Yeonjun

a male K-pop idol under ST Entertainment.

==== Prince of Prince ====
- Yang Jae-won

a social media celebrity and contender in a TV fashion show Prince of Prince.

- Seo Hwi

a model-environmentalist and contender in a TV fashion show Prince of Prince.

==== Others ====
- Yoon Se-yeon

a former member of K-pop boy group No-Time; Su-ho and Seo-jun's late best friend. Se-yeon was bullied back in middle school; he became friends with Su-ho, who attempted to rescue him but got beaten up also, and Seo-jun, who fought against the bullies to stop them, rescuing both Se-yeon and Su-ho. Talented in dancing, he became an idol trainee along with Seo-jun, but he was later invited to join a survival reality show that recruits members of a new idol group. He emerges as one of the finalists who debut as the group No-Time. Since his membership into the show, he has become a victim of harsh online shaming, the extreme stress that resulted led to him committing suicide. His tragic death becomes the center of the broken friendship between Seo-jun and Su-ho.

- Ji Woo-hyun

Soo-jin's friend and Ju-kyung's ex-boyfriend. Unbeknownst to Ju-kyung, Woo-hyun went out with Ju-kyung in a fake relationship at Soo-jin's bidding. He broke up with Ju-kyung after Su-ho discovered that he already has a girlfriend.

- Yoo Eun-hye

Ju-kyung's junior acquaintance at a makeup class. Eun-hye is revealed to be Seo-jun's sasaeng fan who secretly knew about Seo-jun's relationships with Ju-kyung and Su-ho. Knowing that Ju-kyung is Seo-jun's ex-girlfriend, she gets close to Ju-kyung and starts imitating her makeup and fashion. She also smuggles a hidden camera into Seo-jun's bedroom through a fan gift.

- Jo Bo-jung

a vlogger and aspiring K-pop artist; Ju-kyung's former middle school classmate and one of her bullies. Notoriously selfish, arrogant, and haughty, she becomes envious of Ju-kyung's success in vlogging and she tries to destroy her career by attempting to smear her reputation.

- Lee Mi-yeon

a chef and owner of a Japanese cuisine restaurant where Su-ho works; Su-ho's boss and Min-ji's mother. Mi-yeon has a large burn scar that disfigured half of her face due to a vehicular accident that resulted in their family's car bursting into flames; she had exposed herself to the fire just to keep her daughter safe while waiting for rescue to arrive.

- Kim Min-ji

Mi-yeon's daughter and Su-ho's co-worker at her mother's restaurant. Min-ji loves her mother very much despite being teased by her peers because of her mother's disfigured face back in her younger years.

- Cha Seung-ho

a male make-up artist and vlogger; Ju-kyung's friend and Seo-jun's make-up assistant. Like Ju-kyung, Seung-ho was also abused by his peers due to his looks and resorted to make-up to transform himself into a handsome man.

- Producer Lee

Ju Kyung's manager at a YouTuber type company. She later revealed Ju Kyung's secret about her bare face and Bo-Jung being a bully in order to grow subscribers on Ju Kyung's channel.

== Background and publication history ==
=== Naver Webtoon ===
The planning for the Webtoon that would later be known as True Beauty started when Webtoon author Kim Na-young, better known under her nom de plume Yaongyi, was in her late teens. She published the early version of True Beauty in Naver Comics' Challenge Comics (Korean: 도전만화; RR: Dojeon manhwa), a platform for new, self-publishing Webtoon's (akin to Webtoon's CANVAS). In this version, the protagonist was male and was described by Yaongyi as a boy with a "warm appearance" and an "anime otaku."

After a break from webcomics, Yaongyi returned to working on True Beauty in her mid-twenties and changed its protagonist to the current female character Lim Ju-kyung but she kept the Webtoon's theme of "true beauty" (e.g. the person's inner goodness is better than their physical appearance).

Yaongyi also once worked as a fitting model before venturing into webcomics. This, combined with her penchant for fashion and cosmetics, helped her conceptualize True Beauty which would later be published as a formal Naver Webtoon beginning with April 2, 2018, and has been running on a weekly basis on Monday.

Various official translations of True Beauty were published on Naver's non-Korean Webtoon platforms as early as May 2018, when the Thai and Indonesian versions were released starting on the 14th and 19th, respectively. The Chinese version followed on June 29, 2018 while the English version was released on August 14, 2018. In 2019, True Beauty was also translated into Spanish and French, released on November 21 and December 18 respectively.

==== Other names ====
Since its international release, True Beauty has become known under other names other than its international English title and its literal English-translated title. They are as follows:

- The Secret of Angel (in Indonesia; title written in English)
- The Secret of a Goddess (in Thailand; Thai: ความลับของนางฟ้า; RTGS: Khwam-lap khong nangfa; Thai pronunciation: [kʰwaːm˧.lap̚˦˥ kʰɔːŋ˩˩˦ naːŋ˧.faː˦˥])
- Beauty Secrets (in Spain; Spanish: Secretos de belleza; Spanish pronunciation: [seˈkɾetos ðe βeˈʎeθa])

=== Print version ===
A print version of True Beauty was released starting October 29, 2020, by Young Com.

== Adaptations ==
=== Live-action ===
True Beauty has been adapted into a television series of the same name which premiered on tvN on December 9, 2020. The plan to adopt the Webtoon into a television series was revealed in July 2019, and the casting of Moon Ga-young, Cha Eun-woo and Hwang In-yeop was confirmed by August 2020. Written by Lee Si-eun and directed by Kim Sang-hyeop, the series focuses on the original Webtoon's high school story arc but with considerable changes in plot and characterizations. The main characters Lim Ju-kyung, Lee Su-ho, and Han Seo-jun are played by Moon, Cha, and Hwang, respectively, while the supporting character Kang Soo-jin was recharacterized, promoted to be one of the main characters of the series version and is played by Park Yoo-na.

In 2024, a Japanese film adaptation was announced starring Koki Kimura as Reina Tanikawa (Lim Ju-kyung's counterpart). The two-part films, titled True Beauty: Before (女神降臨 Before) and True Beauty: After (女神降臨 After), were released in March and May 2025, respectively.

=== Aeni ===
On November 3, 2021, an aeni series was announced. It was produced by Studio N and Cocktail Media, and aired from August 7 to October 30, 2024. Crunchyroll announced during its panel at Anime NYC 2023 that it would be streaming the series and premiered the show on the same day. Crunchyroll also produced and aired an English dub starting on August 21, 2024, while U-Next produced a Japanese dub version and streamed it on October 5, 2024. The series was later released through other streaming sites include ABEMA, Amazon Prime and Hulu.

A second season was announced on January 4, 2025.

== Reception ==
In 2019, the webtoon was nominated for the 2019 Next Manga Awards in the web category and was placed 4th out of 50 nominees.
