= The Other World's Books Depend on the Bean Counter =

Japanese light novel series and its franchise

- First light novel volume cover, featuring Aresh Indolark (left) and Seiichirō Kondō (right)

異世界の沙汰は社畜次第 (Isekai no Sata wa Shachiku Shidai)
- Genre: Isekai; Boys' love
- Novel series
- Written by: Yatsuki Wakatsu
- Published by: Shōsetsuka ni Narō
- Original run: March 2018 – December 2018
- Light novel
- Written by: Yatsuki Wakatsu
- Illustrated by: Kikka Ohashi
- Published by: Enterbrain
- English publisher: NA: Yen Press
- Original run: February 28, 2019 – present
- Volumes: 4
- Manga
- Written by: Yatsuki Wakatsu
- Illustrated by: Kazuki Irodori
- Published by: Enterbrain
- English publisher: NA: Yen Press
- Imprint: B's Log Comics
- Magazine: B's Log Comic
- Original run: March 26, 2020 – present
- Volumes: 8
- Anime television series

Isekai Office Worker: The Other World's Books Depend on the Bean Counter
- Directed by: Shinji Ishihara; Akira Yamada (assistant)
- Written by: Yoshiko Nakamura
- Music by: Megumi Ōhashi
- Studio: Studio Deen
- Licensed by: Crunchyroll: SEA: Muse Communication
- Original network: AT-X, Tokyo MX, BS11, SUN, KBS Kyoto
- Original run: January 6, 2026 – March 24, 2026
- Episodes: 12
- icon

The Other World's Books Depend on the Bean Counter (Japanese: 異世界の沙汰は社畜次第, Hepburn: Isekai no Sata wa Shachiku Shidai) is a Japanese light novel series written by Yatsuki Wakatsu and illustrated by Kikka Ohashi. It was serialized online from March to December 2018 on the user-generated novel publishing website Shōsetsuka ni Narō. It was later acquired by Enterbrain, which has published four volumes since February 2019. A manga adaptation with art by Kazuki Irodori has been serialized online via Enterbrain's B's Log Comic digital magazine since March 2020 and has been collected in eight tankōbon volumes. An anime television series adaptation produced by Studio Deen aired from January to March 2026.

== Premise ==
Seiichirou Kondou, a Japanese accountant in the modern world, tries to save a teenage girl from a magical portal but falls through it with her. It transports them to a kingdom that had summoned the girl to be their Holy Maiden, and the kingdom compensates Seiichirou by granting his request for a job in the royal accounting department.

To support his intense work ethic, Seiichirou begins a habit of drinking energizing tonics, not realizing that this could be dangerous to his health, until one day he experiences a tonic overdose. Luckily the knight captain Aresh Indolark finds and uses a healing spell on him, but while Seiichirou's life is saved, his condition does not yet improve because he lacks a tolerance for magic, and the only treatment involves Aresh and Seiichirou engaging in sexual activity and physical contact.

== Characters ==
Seiichirou Kondou (近藤 誠一郎, Kondō Seiichirō)
Voiced by: Kent Itō (PV, anime) (Japanese); Eduardo Vildasol (English)
The main character of the series. He was summoned along with Yua Shiraishi by accident as she is to be the Holy Maiden. As Seiichirou cannot go home, he receives a job in the royal accounting department.
Aresh Indolark (アレシュ・インドラーク, Areshu Indorāku)
Voiced by: Tomoaki Maeno (PV, anime) (Japanese); Daniel Van Thomas (English)
A knight, and the commander of the kingdom's Third Royal Order. Other people have called him the "Ice Nobleman" because of his disinterested attitude.
Norbert (ノルベルト, Noruberuto)
Voiced by: Seiichiro Yamashita (anime) (Japanese); Chase Kloza (English)
Kamil (カミル, Kamiru)
Voiced by: Hiroki Tōchi (anime) (Japanese); Mike Smith (English)
Julius (ユーリウス, Yūriusu)
Voiced by: Tomohiro Yamaguchi (anime) (Japanese); Garret Storms (English)
The prince of the Kingdom of Romany. For some reason he seems to distrust Seiichirou.
Yua Shiraishi (白石 優愛, Shiraishi Yua)
Voiced by: Yuna Kamakura (anime) (Japanese); Monica Flatley (English)
Yua is the girl who was summoned to be the kingdom's Holy Maiden, said to be the only person able to purify a deadly miasma. Yua is determined to save the people and the kingdom, causing her to initially clash with Seiichirou, who is concerned that the kingdom may be endangering her for their own gain.
Ist (イスト, Isuto)
Voiced by: Takaaki Torashima (anime)
Siegvold (シーグヴォルド, Shīguvorudo)
Voiced by: Yūki Ono (PV, anime)
Ciro (シーロ, Shīro)
Voiced by: Win Morisaki (anime)
Orjef (オルジフ, Orujifu)
Voiced by: Kazuyuki Okitsu (anime) (Japanese); Ethan Marshall (English)
Selio (セリオ, Serio)
Voiced by: Shiori Izawa (anime)

== Media ==
=== Light novels ===
Written by Yatsuki Wakatsu, The Other World's Books Depend on the Bean Counter was initially serialized on the user-generated novel publishing website Shōsetsuka ni Narō between March and December 2018. It was later acquired by Enterbrain who began publishing it as a light novel with illustrations by Kikka Ohashi on February 28, 2019. Four volumes have been released as of April 1, 2026. The series is licensed in North America by Yen Press.

| No. | Title | Original release date | North American release date |
|---|---|---|---|
| 1 | Holy Maiden Summoning Improvement Plan; Seijo Shōkan Kaizen Keikaku (聖女召喚改善計画) | February 28, 2019; 978-4-04-735538-5 | February 27, 2024; 978-1-9753-6434-2 |
| 2 | Church Management Support Plan; Kyōkai Un'ei Shien Keikaku (教会運営支援計画) | July 31, 2020; 978-4-04-736204-8 | June 18, 2024; 978-1-9753-7373-3 |
| 3 | Magic Research Exchange Plan; Mahō Gaikō Seijō-ka Keikaku (魔法外交正常化計画) | September 30, 2021; 978-4-04-736799-9 | March 18, 2025; 978-1-9753-8920-8 |
| 4 | Kokkyō Chian Saikōchiku Keikaku (国境治安再構築計画) | April 1, 2026; 978-4-04-500018-8 | — |

=== Manga ===
A manga adaptation illustrated by Kazuki Irodori began serialization in Enterbrain's B's Log Comic digital magazine on March 26, 2020. The manga's chapters have been collected into eight tankōbon volumes as of October 2026.

During their panel, at Anime NYC 2021, Yen Press announced that they had licensed the manga adaptation for English publication.

| No. | Original release date | Original ISBN | North American release date | North American ISBN |
|---|---|---|---|---|
| 1 | October 30, 2020 | 978-4-04-736394-6 | August 2, 2022 | 978-1-9753-3886-2 |
| 2 | July 30, 2021 | 978-4-04-736710-4 | August 30, 2022 | 978-1-9753-4514-3 |
| 3 | May 30, 2022 | 978-4-04-736999-3 | May 23, 2023 | 978-1-9753-6185-3 |
| 4 | March 1, 2023 | 978-4-04-737384-6 | March 19, 2024 | 978-1-9753-7650-5 |
| 5 | December 1, 2023 | 978-4-04-737727-1 | December 10, 2024 | 979-8-8554-0696-2 |
| 6 | November 1, 2024 | 978-4-04-738154-4 | January 20, 2026 | 979-8-8554-2097-5 |
| 7 | October 31, 2025 | 978-4-04-738646-4 | February 23, 2027 | 979-8-8554-4947-1 |
| 8 | October 30, 2026 | 978-4-04-500313-4 | — | — |

=== Anime ===
An anime adaptation was announced on November 1, 2024, which was later confirmed to be a television series produced by Studio Deen and directed by Shinji Ishihara, with Akira Yamada serving as assistant director, Yoshiko Nakamura handling series composition, Maki Fujii designing the characters and Megumi Ōhashi composing the music. The series aired from January 6 to March 24, 2026, 2026, on AT-X and other networks. The opening theme song is "Magic", performed by Kobore, while the ending theme song is "Back to Back", performed by Win Morisaki. Crunchyroll is streaming the series under the title Isekai Office Worker: The Other World's Books Depend on the Bean Counter. Muse Communication licensed the series in Southeast Asia, also distributing it on Crunchyroll. Crunchyroll announced on April 27, 2026, that the series will receive an English dub.

| No. | Title | Directed by (Note: Production staff information is taken from the ending credits of each episode.) | Written by | Storyboarded by | Original release date |
|---|---|---|---|---|---|
| 1 | "I Got a Job"; Transliteration: "Shūshoku Shimashita" (Japanese: 就職しました) | Ryo Yasumura | Yoshiko Nakamura | TBA | January 6, 2026 |
Salaryman Seiichirou, witnessing a girl named Yua being pulled into a magic portal, falls into it trying to help her. They awaken in an alternate world where the Romany Kingdom has summoned Yua as their Holy Maiden to purify miasma. Seiichirou, requesting a job, is employed by the Royal Accounting Department, meeting his boss Helmut, coworker Norbert and Commander Aresh. As Seiichirou voluntarily overworks Norbert shows him a tonic to cure fatigue. Yua asks to see Seiichirou, who learns Prince Yurius doesn't trust him. Yua is determined to be a useful Holy Maiden but Seiichirou reminds her they were kidnapped and it's possible the kingdom lied about why. Yua accuses Seiichirou of selfishness, and Aresh warns him that Prime Minister Camile is watching him. Seiichirou discovers their department only exists to approve financial requests for the nobility, so he begins rejecting obviously fraudulent requests. Vice-commander Rhoda worries Yua is too naïve to realise Camile is untrustworthy. Seiichirou finds the fraud is funded by tax money that was supposed to pay for defenses against miasma, but as it only appears once a century nobles routinely steal the money while the Accounting Department covers it up. Unfortunately, there is almost no money left just as the miasma has reappeared. Camile is forced to admit there is a financial crisis so he promotes Seiichirou to Assistant-director. Seiichirou increasingly relies on tonics until suddenly experiencing chest pains with Aresh finding him collapsed in the street.
| 2 | "I Got Promoted"; Transliteration: "Shusse Shimashita" (Japanese: 出世しました) | Shunji Yoshida | Yoshiko Nakamura | TBA | January 13, 2026 |
Realizing Seiichirou has overdosed, Aresh applies healing magic. Unfortunately, this causes magic-sickness as Seiichirou has no resistance to magic, so now the only way Aresh can save his life is to acclimatise his body to Aresh's magic, through sex. The next morning Seiichirou awakens and rushes to work, leaving Aresh alone and furious. Seiichirou feels guilty since Aresh did save his life, and decides he must compensate him. Aresh is grumpy at Yua who has barely begun learning to use her purification magic. Aresh drags Seiichirou to Medical Director Quellbus, who theorizes Seiichirou wasn't granted the same magical protection as Yua during the summoning, so even the weak magic in tonic caused an overdose. Quellbus changes Seiichirou's diet since there is even magic in food, and demands he get proper sleep. The whole palace staff is aghast as Aresh starts following Seiichirou like a nurse, forcing him to eat and rest. Seiichirou considers that regular sex might be worth it if he can go back on the tonics, but Aresh drags him from his office for dinner, where Aresh asks why Seiichirou bothers to work when the King offered to support him financially. Seiichirou explains working is part of who he is. This only irritates Aresh further.
| 3 | "I Got A Manager"; Transliteration: "Kanri Saremashita" (Japanese: 管理されました) | Naoki Murata | Yoshiko Nakamura | TBA | January 20, 2026 |
Aresh catches Seiichirou buying a tonic for his headache. He heals the headache then kisses him, leaving Seiichirou confused. Camile asks Seiichirou about his lack of contact with Yua but accepts Seiichirou's explanation they didn't know each other before the summoning. Aresh asks why Seiichirou won't delegate work tasks. Seiichirou insists he is trying to solve the financial crisis, which Aresh knew nothing about precisely because he delegates financial matters to his subordinates. Yua, having a crush on Aresh, tried to surprise him at lunch but finds him with Seiichirou. A knight of the Second Order accuses Seiichirou of romantic interest in Yua, but Seiichirou has no interest in those younger than him. This seemingly upsets Aresh, who is 8 years younger than Seiichirou. Yua offers to heal Seiichirou's fatigue, panicking Aresh who drags him away to kiss him just in case. He considers putting an anti-magic barrier around Seiichirou, but this would require having sex again. Orjef is amazed Aresh does his own paperwork, then more shocked when he asks about relationships with age gaps. Orjef assumes it might not work because of differing values. Camile reveals he will be sending Yua and a Royal Orders of Knights to the Demon Forest, so he needs Seiichirou to calculate the budget. Seiichirou is attacked by three men.
| 4 | "I Punished Them"; Transliteration: "Danzai Shimashita" (Japanese: 断罪しました) | Hiromichi Matano | Sayuri Ōba | TBA | January 27, 2026 |
Camile finds Seiichirou unconscious. Camile is confused when Aresh treats Seiichirou instead of Quellbus. The severity of his injuries requires Aresh to heal him while having sex with him to continually stop magic-sickness killing him. Seichirou recalls his attackers; Harvey and Matthew, soldiers from the Third Order whose financial applications he rejected and Yua's bodyguard from the Second Order who accused him of interest in Yua. Aresh, Camile and Commander Makovska of the Second Order punish the three men with suspension, restraining orders, forfeiture of one year's salary and additional compensation to be paid to Seiichirou. Seiichirou is satisfied as the forfeited salaries mean they can afford to send Yua to the Demon Forest ahead of schedule. He also uses the compensation to pay Aresh for the treatments, which Aresh is eventually convinced to accept. Seiichirou also agrees to have the anti-magic barrier, which must be applied in several sessions with bare skin contact. Seiichirou is baffled when the King decides to host a banquet to celebrate Yua's mission; it will cost a fortune out of Seiichirou's new budget, and he is prevented from working on the problem when Norbert sends his mother's maids with a full health plan to cure his unhealthy appearance. At the banquet Aresh is amazed by Seiichirou's new look.
| 5 | "I Went on an Expedition"; Transliteration: "Ensei Shimashita" (Japanese: 遠征しました) | Matsuo Asami & Akira Yamada | Yuka Yamada | TBA | February 3, 2026 |
Seiichirou meets Director Zoltan of the Royal Sorcery Department and Assistant-director Ist. Yurius petulantly demands Seiichirou join the expedition, ignoring everyone's claims that entering the Demon Forest without resistance to magic would be suicide. Seiichirou spends days preparing, though this makes Aresh angry when he discovers Seiichirou has been working at night and using tonics. He insists on spending the night reinforcing Seiichirou's barrier. Seiichirou learns Aresh is the youngest of his siblings, making Seiichirou worry about his own parents. The expedition is shocked by Aresh forcing Seiichirou to ride on his horse with him for continuous healing, especially Orjef, who notices Seiichirou is wearing Aresh' spare traveling clothes. Seiichirou makes a deal with Ist concerning his funding. Yua asks to swap places so she can ride with Aresh. Seiichirou reminds her of her position as Holy Maiden and of his weakness to magic, so her request was not only improper it would have risked his life. He warns her to really start thinking about their situation, upsetting her. Their conversation is reported to Aresh who manages to stop Yurius finding out. Aresh is also unhappy Seiichirou met with Ist in private. As they approach the Demon Forest Yua's fear grows as she starts realizing how dangerous the mission is. They prepare to leave the non-warriors with the carriages, but Yurius insists Seiichirou continue to accompany them, infuriating Aresh.
| 6 | "I Made a Proposal"; Transliteration: "Teian Shimashita" (Japanese: 提案しました) | Naoki Murata | Yoshiko Nakamura | TBA | February 10, 2026 |
Yua cleanses 30% of the miasma before collapsing. Seiichirou reveals he made a deal with Ist for the Royal Sorcery Department to help the Third Order on an experiment he devised should Yua fail, enraging Yurius. At Seiichirou's direction an experimental barrier is placed around the demon tree responsible, preventing its miasma spreading. Aresh is amazed no one else ever considered this method. Seiichirou hopes if it works as a long-term solution the Kingdom won't need to kidnap another Holy Maiden ever again. Seiichirou realises eventually he will need to address Aresh's feelings. The King praises Seiichirou for his barrier idea, though many nobles consider it blasphemous as it undermines the Holy Maiden, but the nobility is astonished when Seiichirou provides evidence that compared to summoning a Holy Maiden and supporting her financially for her entire life, his barrier plan is five times cheaper. Yua speaks in Seiichirou's defense, revealing she wants to go home to her family, and breaks down crying. Seiichirou reveals that Ist has already begun researching a spell for returning them to Japan, requiring expanding the Royal Sorcery Department in manpower, money and research potential. The King realises Seiichirou is proposing replacing the Holy Maiden with advanced magical technology, improving life for the entire kingdom and all within a budget that actually saves money. Yurius is stunned when Yua asks to leave the palace and get a normal job to support herself once she finishes cleansing the miasma.
| 7 | "I Went On A Temporary Assignment"; Transliteration: "Shukkō Shimashita" (Japanese: 出向しました) | Shunji Yoshida | Sayuri Ōba | TBA | February 17, 2026 |
Aresh announces he bought a house for them, though it turns out to be a mansion with a butler Valtom, a maid Milan and a chef Pavel. Aresh is amazed when Seiichirou describes the one room apartment he rented in Japan. Seiichirou comes to accept Aresh sneaking into his bed every night to maintain his barrier but doesn't try to have sex with him again. The second expedition goes well, allowing Seiichirou to begin plans to fund research for the spell to return to Japan. As this will mean leaving Aresh he needs time to consider his feelings. The King asks Seiichirou to investigate the finances of the Alban Church, angering Aresh as the church is full of holy magic that could harm Seiichirou, including the prayers recited by priests. Camile warns Aresh his blatant favouritism towards Seiichirou is having political consequences, so time apart will be beneficial. Seiichirou is not welcomed by the priests who resent his interference, and is warned by priest Selio to look at whatever paperwork he wants but not to expect help from anybody. Seiichirou is later met by senior priest Siegvold who is furious at Selio for not telling him the King ordered an investigation and for being rude to Seiichirou. Selio admits Bishop Mateus told him to be as unhelpful as possible. Seiichirou leaves for the day and is scolded by Aresh for being late.
| 8 | "I Went To Work On My Day Off"; Transliteration: "Kyūjitsu Shukkin Shimashita" (Japanese: 休日出勤しました) | Hiromichi Matano | Yuka Yamada | TBA | February 24, 2026 |
Seiichirou asks to meet church accountant Cipriano but is told Cipriano is working with Mateus and will be absent for some time. Siegvold believes Alban intervened to ensure Seiichirou was summoned to help save the kingdom. On his day off Seiichirou visits the palace to work and learns from Norbert priests are usually nobles or mages, as ceremonies require a lot of magic. Seiichirou learns Ist's research has stalled already as his funding has run out. He also meets Yua, who has been working at the church as a healer. Yurius asks Seiichirou why Yua rejects his support. Seiichirou is unable to answer, since it is obvious Yua is rejecting the Holy Maiden role. Seiichirou worries about upsetting the priests as many are still connected to their noble birth families, including their politics. Due to a shortage of sorcerers Seiichirou concludes a fourth expedition will be needed for his barrier experiment, after Yua purifies the demon tree on the third expedition. From Aresh he learns the church often takes in powerful children whose magic is out of control, regardless if the child is noble or commoner. Seiichirou is outraged Aresh gropes him and concludes he is putting on weight.
| 9 | "I Made A Plan"; Transliteration: "Keikaku Shimashita" (Japanese: 計画しました) | Matsuo Asami & Akira Yamada | Sayuri Ōba | TBA | March 3, 2026 |
Seiichirou visits the alms-house where the church cares for children who can't control their magic. He encounters Yua who is disappointed alms-house children don't receive education. Selio insists alms-houses don't have funds for education, but Seiichirou designs a class schedule that would let the children work and study. Selio wonders if he misjudged Seiichirou. Camile angrily orders Mateus and Cipriano to return and cooperate with Seiichirou's investigation. He is also not surprised Seiichirou has already discovered embezzlement in the church. As Seiichirou is not going on the third expedition, Aresh spends 24 hours adding extra reinforcements to his barrier. Before he leaves Aresh is surprised Seiichirou wishes for him to come home safe, so he impulsively kisses him goodbye. Seiichiroui finds that Mateus is deliberately hostile, but Cipriano seems genuinely apologetic for letting church finances get out of hand. Siegvold is ecstatic about Seiichirou's plan to open a church school, which even pleases Mateus. Seven days later Yua finishes purifying the demon tree, yet Aresh is delayed due to monsters. Seiichirou feels better on getting a letter from Aresh. He is confused by a line asking him to "sleep soundly with my soul", then embarrassed when Milan explains it is a knight's phrase declaring "passionate intentions".
| 10 | "I Investigated"; Transliteration: "Chōsa Shimashita" (Japanese: 調査しました) | Motohiko Niwa | Yuka Yamada | TBA | March 10, 2026 |
Seiichirou realises he can no longer imagine his life without Aresh. Seiichirou learns from Ist that church relics store magic converted from prayers. Yurius asks Seiichirou and Norbert about Yua, and Seiichirou convinces him the almshouse school was Yua's idea, so Yurius decides to finance the school himself. Norbert reveals magic taken by the relics is secretly used to power the barrier protecting the kingdom from monsters and magical attacks. Seiichirou realises the King must be buying the stored magic from the Church to power the barrier. Yurius visits the almshouse incognito. Sigma decides to attend the school. Ist visits to watch everyone sending prayers to the relic. Yurius is shocked Yua has been praying regularly, accidentally making herself weaker. While watching children praying Seiichirou realises children whose magic is out of control are told to pray to the relic, then when their magic is taken and they regain control they believe it is a blessing from Alban. Sigma notices their method of prayer is abnormal, with Ist confirming the new method seems designed to give away too much magic, resulting in even greater loss of control. Ist and Sigma spontaneously invent a method of measuring how much magic a person possesses. One of the praying children loses control and a magical explosion appears to hit Seiichirou.
| 11 | "I Got Hospitalized"; Transliteration: "Nyūin Shimashita" (Japanese: 入院しました) | Naoki Murata | Yoshiko Nakamura | TBA | March 17, 2026 |
Siegvold blocks the explosion but Seiichirou develops magic sickness instantly. Aresh, who had finally returned home, rushes him to Quellbus' clinic. Quellbus warns Aresh he might need multiple tonics, which can be dangerous, but Aresh takes them anyway and has sex with Seiichirou to restore his barrier. Seiichirou is forced to rest for three days, during which Aresh doesn't visit him. He eventually learns from Valtom Aresh developed tonic overdose, making Seiichirou feel guilty. After recovering, Seiichirou learns Ist has begun working with Sigma on their magic measuring tool, disappointing him as he had hoped to steer Sigma toward a career as an accountant. Siegvold visits with worrying news that the new prayer being used was actually designed to cause an explosion, which someone at the church aimed at Seiichirou to kill him. Siegvold also reveals the only magic user skilled enough to do that is Cipriano. Seichirou is confused as his investigation was almost over and nothing pointed toward Cipriano being guilty of anything. Grateful he saved his life again, Seiichirou insists on giving Aresh a gift to show his appreciation. Aresh asks him to begin speaking to him informally, like he does with Sigma. Seiichirou is surprised Aresh is jealous of Sigma, and that it makes Aresh seem more attractive to him.
| 12 | "We Cornered Him, And Then . . ."; Transliteration: "Oitsumemashita。Soshite" (Japanese: 追い詰めました。そして) | Shunji Yoshida | Yoshiko Nakamura | TBA | March 24, 2026 |
Seiichirou returns to the church and with Camile as a witness he uses Ist's device during prayers and discovers the amount of magic being donated was far higher than was needed. Camile demands to know where the extra magic has been going and Seiichirou reveals Cipriano has been stealing it. Exposed, Cipriano reveals he is a follower of the eastern Goddess Merke, a rival of Alban. Cipriano reveals the extra magic has been stored in an explosive crystal he plans to detonate. Yua contains the crystal in the same barrier used to contain the demon tree, preventing the explosion. Cipriano is arrested for embezzlement, stealing magic, attempted murder, fraud and high treason and imprisoned for life. Mateus is transferred to the distant countryside. A month later the school has grown larger than expected. Yua and Yurius start getting along better. Due to the church scandal Siegvold is summoned home by his father the Marquis of Aelvaar but plans to continue working as a priest. Seiichirou still has doubts about reciprocating Aresh's feelings in case he ever has the opportunity to return to Japan, but when Aresh asks him to go on a beach vacation he initiates a kiss with Aresh for the first time.
| OVA | "I Let My Thoughts Wander"; Transliteration: "TBA" (Japanese: TBA) | TBA | TBA | TBA | N/A |
Seiichirou encounters a noble lady while shopping. Aresh buys a heater for Seichirou's room, as winters is approaching. The shopkeeper offers a free gift, a magic item resembling a telescope. Seiichirou finds by twisting the items two halves the designs on the outside form letters Aresh identifies as ancient text, the language used to cast spells. As the text does not form a spell Ist deduces the decorative pattern might be important. Quellbus reveals Egorova Kingdom mages use ancient text differently, so to an Egorovan the text might mean something. Aresh reveals the lady Seiichirou met was Countess Hanzelka from Egorova. Aresh confirms the pattern contains normal words, a romantic dedication to a woman named Lina. Seiichirou explains how Kanji symbols can have different meanings, so Aresh deciphers the ancient text as individual words and deduces the item stores and projects pictures. They seek out Countess Hanzelka, who confirms her nickname was Lina and the item was a gift from her first lover, before her arranged marriage to Count Hanzelka. Seichirou notices Lina wears a jewelled ring, which when placed in the item projects pictures of her and her lover when they were young. Seichirou leaves the item with the grateful Lina but wonders what might happen if one day he has to leave Aresh.

=== Other media ===
In commemoration of the release of the manga adaptation's second volume, a promotional video featuring the voices of Kent Itō and Tomoaki Maeno was uploaded to Kadokawa Corporation's YouTube channel that same day. Another promotional video commemorating the release of the manga adaptation's fifth volume was released that same day. It featured Itō and Maeno reprising their roles from the previous promotional video, and Yūki Ono.

== Reception ==
By November 2024, the series has over 1.4 million copies in circulation.

== See also ==
- The Villainesses Are Unwavering, another light novel with the same writer
