= Eduardo Vildasol =

American voice actor

- Born: El Paso, Texas, US
- Occupation: Voice actor
- Years active: 2023–present
- Notable credits: Kei Mikhail Ignatov in Psycho-Pass; Mao in Twilight Out of Focus; Suho in True Beauty; Alec in The Banished Court Magician Aims to Become the Strongest; Kondou in Isekai Office Worker: The Other World's Books Depend on the Bean Counter
- Website: www.eduardovildasol.com

Eduardo Vildasol is a Native American and Latinx actor known for his voice work in anime. He is best known for his roles as Kei Mikhail Ignatov in Psycho-Pass, Mao in Twilight Out of Focus, and Suho in True Beauty.

== Biography ==
Raised in El Pasco, Texas, Vildasol took ballet and acting classes as a child. Initially studying marine conservation sciences in college, he shifted to acting within a year and found his prior dance experience helped him with musical theater auditions. After completing his schooling, Vildasol joined a Canadian circus company before eventually making his way back to Texas and pursuing acting, on stage and screen.

Vildasol identifies as queer, using he/they pronouns.

== Filmography ==
=== Animated series ===
List of voice performances in animated series
Year	Title	Role	Notes	Ref.
2023	The Saint's Magic Power Is Omnipotent	Oscar		
2023	I'm in Love with the Villainess	Matt Monte		
2024	Campfire Cooking in Another World with My Absurd Skill	Kaito		
2024	Twilight Out of Focus	Mao		
2024	True Beauty	Suho		
2024	I'll Become a Villainess Who Goes Down in History	Albert		
2025	The Water Magician	Eto		
2025	My Status as an Assassin Obviously Exceeds the Hero's	Watabe		
2025	The Banished Court Magician Aims to Become the Strongest	Alec		
2026	Isekai Office Worker: The Other World's Books Depend on the Bean Counter	Kondo		
2026	Full Clearing Another World Under a Goddess with Zero Believers	Ryosuke Sakurai		

=== Film ===
- Psycho-Pass Providence (2023) Kei Mikhail
