= The Villainesses Are Unwavering =

Japanese light novel

- Light novel volume cover, featuring from left to right: Bernardetta, Serafina (sitting), and Sandra

悪役令嬢たちは揺るがない (Akuyaku Reijō-tachi wa Yuruganai)
- Genre: Fantasy
- Novel series
- Written by: Yatsuki Wakatsu
- Published by: Shōsetsuka ni Narō
- Original run: September 10, 2022 – October 14, 2022
- Light novel
- Written by: Yatsuki Wakatsu
- Illustrated by: Taku Haruno
- Published by: Enterbrain
- Published: November 30, 2023
- Volumes: 1
- Manga
- Written by: Yatsuki Wakatsu
- Illustrated by: Nina Akabane
- Published by: Kadokawa Shoten
- English publisher: NA: Yen Press
- Imprint: Flos Comic
- Magazine: KadoComi
- Original run: October 3, 2024 – August 27, 2026
- Volumes: 4

The Villainesses Are Unwavering (悪役令嬢たちは揺るがない, Akuyaku Reijō-tachi wa Yuruganai) is a Japanese light novel written by Yatsuki Wakatsu and illustrated by Taku Haruno. It was initially serialized as a web novel on Shōsetsuka ni Narō between September and October 2022. It was later published by Enterbrain in November 2023. A manga adaptation illustrated by Nina Akabane was serialized on Kadokawa Corporation's KadoComi manga website from October 2024 to August 2026.

== Synopsis ==
Aini Miccola, the illegitimate daughter of a countryside baron, has been the center of attention at the Royal Academy six months after arriving, having been made an apprentice saint prior to her arrival. Boys gush over her perceived cuteness, while girls display hostility towards her for her unladylike demeanor. Later, Aini is confronted by three girls in particular; Serafina, daughter of a marquess and fiancée of the crown prince Eric, Sandra, a daughter of a viscount, and Bernardetta, an attendant of the prime minister and heiress to a house with close ties to the royal family. The three girls are likened to villainesses, and confront Aini over her lack of ladylike traits.

== Characters ==
Serafina (セラフィーナ)
Voiced by: Yoko Hikasa (voice comic)
Eric (エーリク, Erikku)
Voiced by: Takeo Ōtsuka (voice comic)
Aini (アイニ)
Voiced by: Maaya Uchida (voice comic)
Sandra (サンドラ, Sandora)
Voiced by: Reina Ueda (voice comic)
Bernardetta (ベルナルデッタ, Berunarudetta)
Voiced by: Hitomi Ueda (voice comic)

== Media ==
=== Light novel ===
Written by Yatsuki Wakatsu, The Villainesses Are Unwavering was initially serialized as a web novel on Shōsetsuka ni Narō from September 10, to October 14, 2022. It was later published by Enterbrain as a light novel with illustrations by Taku Haruno on November 30, 2023.

No.	Release date	ISBN
1	November 30, 2023	978-4-04-737725-7

=== Manga ===
A manga adaptation illustrated by Nina Akabane was serialized on Kadokawa Corporation's KadoComi manga website from October 3, 2024 to August 27, 2026. The manga's chapters were compiled into four tankōbon volumes released from February 5, 2025, to September 4, 2026.

During their panel at San Diego Comic-Con 2026, Yen Press announced that they had licensed the series for English publication, with the first volume set to release in January 2027.

No.	Original release date	Original ISBN	North American release date	North American ISBN
1	February 5, 2025	978-4-04-684529-0	January 26, 2027	979-8-8554-3304-3
2	August 5, 2025	978-4-04-685030-0	—	—
3	February 5, 2026	978-4-04-685660-9	—	—
4	September 4, 2026	978-4-04-660446-0	—	—

=== Other ===
In commemoration of the release of the manga's third volume, a voice comic adaptation was uploaded to Kadokawa Corporation's YouTube channel on February 5, 2026. The voice comic featured performances from Yoko Hikasa, Takeo Ōtsuka, Maaya Uchida, Reina Ueda, and Hitomi Ueda.

== Reception ==
The manga adaptation won the grand prize in the Isekai Division of the 2025 Renta Manga Awards. The manga adaptation was ranked 11th in the seventh Sanyodo Bookstore Comic Awards in 2026.

== See also ==
- The Other World's Books Depend on the Bean Counter, another light novel series with the same writer
