= Traveling Fish =

Single album by Hwiyoung
- Released: June 20, 2024
- Genre: K-pop
- Length: 10:17
- Language: Korean; English
- Label: FNC Entertainment

Singles from Traveling Fish
- 1. "Drive5" Released: August 13, 2023; 2. "HBD" Released: December 9, 2023; 3. "It Is Love" Released: June 20, 2024

Traveling Fish is the debut single album by South Korean singer Hwiyoung of SF9 released on June 20, 2024, by FNC Entertainment. The album consists of three tracks, including the title track, "It Is Love".

== Background ==
Hwiyoung's first single album, "Traveling Fish," tells the story of a young man who falls in love and freely travels the "sea of love." The album depicts young people who have overcome countless loves, breakups, emotions, and anxieties, and are moving towards a new love that gives them the courage to do anything. Hwiyoung's emotional vocals and honest and intuitive lyrics will come together to give listeners a fresh excitement. In addition, the single album being released this time includes a total of three songs, including 'Drive5' and 'HBD'. In particular, Hwiyoung participated in writing and composing all the songs, completing music with even more sincerity.

I participated in writing and composing all the songs on the album that was released this time; I tried not to make it in a calculated way, and I also tried to express myself as honestly as possible without being technical or trying to show off too much. I want to work harder and release a full album or EP.

— Hwiyoung talks about the album.

== Commercial performance ==
The single album sold 4,339+ copies in South Korea. It peaked at number 28 on the Korean Gaon Chart.

== Track listing ==
No.	Title	Lyrics	Music	Length
1.	"It Is Love ♥"	Hwiyoung	Hwiyoung; Go Jinyoung	3:29
2.	"Drive5"	Hwiyoung	Hwiyoung; SlyBerry; Rapid	3:19
3.	"HBD"	Han Seong-ho; Hwiyoung	Hwiyoung; Himo	3:32
Total length:				10:17
