= Miracle (web series) =

- Genre: Romance, Youth
- Written by: 이효진
- Directed by: 명현우
- Starring: Kang Chan-hee; Hwiyoung; Kang Min-ah
- Country of origin: South Korea
- Original language: Korean

Production
- Production company: PRODUCTION H

Miracle (Korean: 미라클) is a Korean web series, first premiered on Japanese pay TV Eigeki in April 2022, and later release on OTT streaming platform Viu and Viki in June 2022.

The series is about several teenagers overcoming hardships and growing up while pursuing their dreams.

It is released as a Viu Original series in selected regions by Viu since June 24, 2022.

== Synopsis ==
So-rin, who was once an idol trainee, convinced Shi-woo to audition in a survival show. Shi-woo performed so well in the show that he was later in recruited in the idol group N/S. He hopes to be a successful singer like the global star Luice.

On the other hand, even though the international sensation Luice is loved by fans all around the world, he has been worried that his status would be stolen. There's a specific group that he's especially aware of, and that is N/S. One day, So-rin meets Luice, and their lives are since altered.

== Cast and characters ==
=== Main cast ===
- Kang Chan-hee as Luice, a global star.
- Kang Min-ah as So-rin, a fan of Luice who as a trainee was once hoping to debut in a girl group; currently the content creator of an entertainment agency.
- Hwiyoung as Shi-woo, a member of N/S who became an idol because of his high school friendship with So-rin.

== Soundtrack ==
The original soundtrack of Miracle was released since May 2022, distributed by music label Warner Music Korea.

| No. | Title | Artist | Length |
|---|---|---|---|
| 1. | "ONE TWO THREE" | Kim Dong-han | 03:11 |
| 2. | "Shining Star" | Kang Chan-hee | 03:04 |
| 3. | "널 위해" (For You) | Bleachers | 03:50 |
| 4. | "우리 둘 사이에" (Between Us Two) | Weki Meki | 03:11 |
| 5. | "Forever love" | Kang Chan-hee | 03:05 |
| 6. | "Milky Way" | Kang Chan-hee, Hwiyoung and Kang Min-ah | 03:25 |
