= Love in Sync =

2026 South Korean television series

- Promotional poster
- Hangul: 공감세포
- Hanja: 共感細胞
- Lit.: Empathy Cell
- RR: Gonggam sepo
- MR: Konggam sep'o
- Genre: Romantic comedy
- Written by: Jeong Yeon; Kim Sung-rae
- Directed by: Kim Chil-bong
- Starring: Kim Myung-soo; Kang Min-ah; Kwon So-hyun; Shin Woo-gyum
- Country of origin: South Korea
- Original language: Korean
- No. of episodes: 8

Production
- Production companies: WeMad; LG U+; MBC C&I

Original release
- Network: Lifetime; U+ Mobile TV
- Release: July 4 – July 26, 2026

Love in Sync (Korean: 공감세포) is a 2026 South Korean romantic comedy television series written by Jeong Yeon and Kim Sung-rae, directed by Kim Chil-bong, and starring Kim Myung-soo, Kang Min-ah, Kwon So-hyun, and Shin Woo-gyum. The series depicts a woman who denies empathy and a man who embraces it learning emotions anew after a surreal event called "emotional transference" causes their worlds to collide. It premiered simultaneously on Lifetime, U+ Mobile TV, and Disney+ (Note: Only available in South Korea and Japan) on July 4, 2026, at 22:50 (KST) in South Korea, and on Viu in selected regions.

== Cast and characters ==
=== Main ===
- Kim Myung-soo as Cha Eun-hwan

A psychological counselor, who finds his life upended by a sudden incident that throws his emotions and daily routine into chaos. Just as he is struggling to cope, someone from his past reappears, setting off a chain reaction that reshapes his life and heart.

- Kang Min-ah as Yoo Ji-an

A former girl group member who became an actress. Her acting skills come under fire due to her lack of empathy, throwing her into crisis. However, working with counselor Eun-hwan sparks an "emotional transfer" that helps her regain her emotional depth and growth.

- Kwon So-hyun as Han Yi-jin, an actress and Ji-an's rival
- Shin Woo-gyum as Dong-kyung, Eun-hwan's best friend

=== Supporting ===
- Cha Min-ji as Cha Song-hwan
- Kang Pil-jun as Do-hoon
- Kim Da-hye as Hyun-ji
- Ok Yoon-joong as Manager Kim
- Jang Sung-won as Teacher Lee
- Kim Yi-hyun as Lee Young-ji
- Park Chae-won as Shin Mi-jung

== Production ==
=== Development ===
The series is directed by Kim Chil-bong, who helmed The Second Husband (2021–2022) and Numbers (2023), and co-written by Jeong Yeon and Kim Sung-rae. It is produced by WeMad, LG U+, and MBC C&I. This project is led by the global media company A+E Korea, which handled production investment and global distribution, and distribution in Japan and Asia has already been completed.

=== Casting ===
In February 2026, Kim Myung-soo and Kang Min-ah were confirmed to lead the series. The next month, Kwon So-hyun joined the cast. By June 2026, the main cast was confirmed to include Kim, Kang, Kwon, and Shin Woo-gyum.

== Release ==
The series premiered simultaneously on Lifetime, U+ Mobile TV, and Disney+ on July 4, 2026, at 22:50 (KST). It is also available for streaming on Viu in selected regions.
