= Park You-na =

South Korean actress (born 1997)

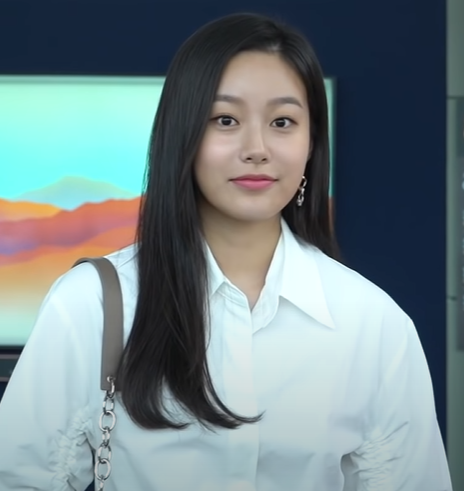
- Park in 2019
- Born: December 23, 1997 (age 28); Seoul, South Korea
- Education: Hanlim Multi Art School
- Occupation: Actress
- Years active: 2015–present
- Agent: KeyEast

Korean name
- Hangul: 박유나
- RR: Bak Yuna
- MR: Pak Yuna

Park You-na (Korean: 박유나; born December 23, 1997) is a South Korean actress. She is best known for her roles in the television series My ID is Gangnam Beauty (2018), Sky Castle (2018–2019), Hotel del Luna (2019), True Beauty (2020–2021), and Rookie Cops (2022).

== Career ==
In August 2023, Park signed with new agency YG Entertainment.

In April 2025, Park left YG Entertainment and signed with new agency KeyEast.

== Personal life ==
She attended Hanlim Multi Art School as a practical dance major before turning to acting.

== Filmography ==
=== Film ===
Year	Title	Role	Ref.
2021	White Day: Broken Limit	So-young	
2022	A Man of Reason	Jin-ah	
2023	Long Distance	Tae-in	

=== Television series ===
Year	Title	Role	Notes	Ref.
2015	Cheer Up!	Kim Kyung-eun		
2015–2016	Six Flying Dragons			
2017	Stranger	Kwon Min-ah / Kim Ga-yeong		
2017	Modulove			
2017	The Package	Na Hyun		
2018	Gangnam Beauty	Yoo-eun		
2018	Drama Special	Joo Young-joo	Episode: "So Close, Yet So Far"	
2018–2019	Sky Castle	Cha Se-ri		
2019	Two Hearts	Yoo Seon-woo		
2019	Hotel del Luna	Lee Mi-Ra / Princess Song-hwa		
2020–2021	True Beauty	Kang Soo-jin		
2026	Love on the Menu	Han Gyu-young		
2026	Oh! My Guard	Song Na-ri		

=== Web series ===
Year	Title	Role	Ref.
2022	Rookie Cops	Gi Han-na	
2025	Spirit Fingers	Nam Geu-rin (Mint Finger)	

=== Music video appearances ===
Year	Song title	Singer	Notes	Ref.
2016	"#WYD" (오늘 모해)	iKon	Bobby's love interest	
2019	"Old Movie" (옛날사람)	Kim Hee-chul (Super Junior)		
