= Kang Min-ah =

South Korean actress (born 1997)

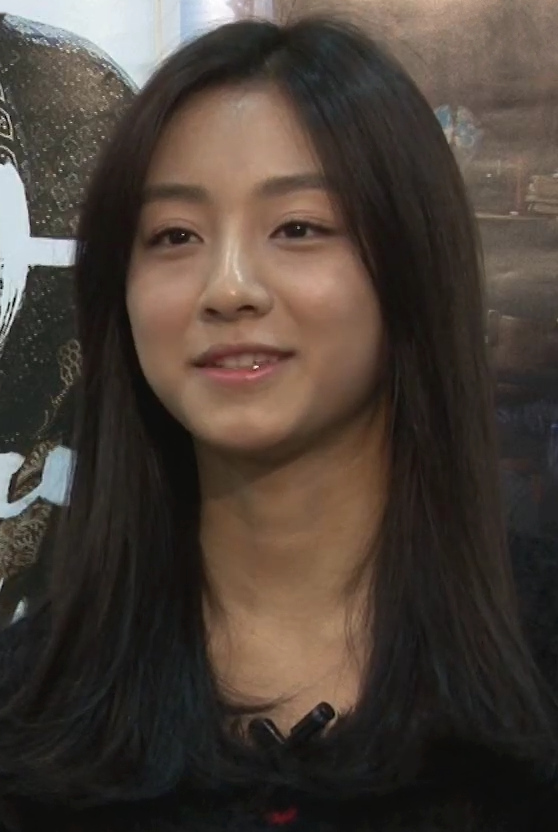
- Kang in 2014
- Born: March 20, 1997 (age 29); Seoul, South Korea
- Education: Seoul Broadcasting High School
- Occupation: Actress
- Years active: 2009–present
- Agent: Blitzway Entertainment
- Height: 1.60 m (5 ft 3 in)

Korean name
- Hangul: 강민아
- Hanja: 姜旻兒
- RR: Gang Mina
- MR: Kang Mina

Kang Min-ah (Korean: 강민아; born March 20, 1997), is a South Korean actress. She is known for the television dramas Schoolgirl Detectives (2014–2015), True Beauty (2020–2021), and At a Distance, Spring Is Green (2021).

== Filmography ==
=== Film ===
| Year | Title | Role | Ref. |
|---|---|---|---|
| 2009 | To the Sea | So-yeon | |
| 2010 | Baeckkajehae (百家濟海) | young So-woong | |
| 2011 | Pained | Nam-soon's older sister | |
| 2011 | Grape Candy: The Promise of 17 Years Ago | young So-ra | |
| 2014 | Man in Love | Song-ji | |
| 2014 | The Huntresses | young Hong-dan | |
| 2016 | Hiya | Choi Han-joo | |
| 2018 | Park Hwa-young | Eun Mi-jung | |

=== Television series ===
| Year | Title | Role | Notes | Ref. |
|---|---|---|---|---|
| 2012 | Love, My Love | Yeo Eui-joo | | |
| 2013 | Jang Ok-jung, Living by Love | Young Jang Ok-jung | | |
| 2014–2015 | Schoolgirl Detectives | Yoon Mi-do | | |
| 2015 | Cheer Up! | Park Da-mi | | |
| 2016 | Bring It On, Ghost | Eun-sung | | |
| 2016 | KBS Drama Special: "A World Without Nineteen" | Yoon Seo-kyung | one act-drama | |
| 2017–2018 | Modulove (Everybody's Romance) | Kang Min-ah | | |
| 2020 | Memorist | Sul Cho-won | | |
| 2020–2021 | True Beauty | Choi Soo-ah | | |
| 2021 | Beyond Evil | Kang Min-jung | | |
| 2021 | At a Distance, Spring Is Green | Kim So-bin | | |
| 2022 | Gaus Electronics | Geon Kang-mi | | |
| 2026 | Love in Sync | Yoo Ji-an | | |

=== Web series ===
| Year | Title | Role | Notes | Ref. |
|---|---|---|---|---|
| 2016 | Tomorrow Boy | Jo Ah-ra | | |
| 2017 | Between Friendship and Love | Yeo Yoo-jung | Season 2 | |
| 2019 | Love As You Taste | Hong Cho-i | | |
| 2019 | A-Teen 2 | Cha Ah-hyun | | |
| 2019 | Monchouchou Global house | Kang Yu-na | | |
| 2020 | The Temperature of Language: Our Nineteen | Han Yu-ri | | |
| 2022 | Miracle | Lee So-rin | | |

=== Music video appearances ===
| Year | Song Title | Artist |
|---|---|---|
| 2013 | "You and I" | Yoo Seung-woo |
| 2018 | "Wait a sec" | Andup |
| 2018 | "Additional" | Paul Kim |
| 2020 | "I still love you a lot" | Baek Ji-young |

== Awards and nominations ==
Name of the award ceremony, year presented, category, nominee of the award, and the result of the nomination
| Award ceremony | Year | Category | Nominee / Work | Result | Ref. |
|---|---|---|---|---|---|
| Brand of the Year Awards | 2019 | Rising Star of the Year (Female Actress) | Kang Min-ah | Nominated | |
| Korea University Film Festival | 2019 | Acting award | Park Hwa-young | Won | |
| Seoul Webfest | 2019 | Best Actress | Love As You Taste | Nominated | |
