= True Beauty (South Korean TV series) =

2020–21 South Korean television series

- Promotional poster
- Hangul: 여신강림
- Hanja: 女神降臨
- Lit.: The Advent of a Goddess
- RR: Yeosin gangnim
- MR: Yŏsin kangnim
- Genre: Romance; Comedy; Slice of life Coming-of-age
- Based on: True Beauty by Yaongyi
- Developed by: Studio Dragon
- Written by: Lee Si-eun
- Directed by: Kim Sang-hyeop
- Starring: Moon Ga-young; Cha Eun-woo; Hwang In-youp; Park Yoo-na
- Opening theme: "Milky Way" by Park Se-joon & Na Sang-jin
- Ending theme: Various themes (Note: The end themes used vary per episode but are all singles from True Beauty: Original Soundtrack. See the list of singles for details.)
- Composer: Park Se-joon et al. (Note: See True Beauty: Original Soundtrack for the names of all involved musical score composers.)
- Country of origin: South Korea
- Original language: Korean
- No. of episodes: 16

Production
- Executive producers: Kim Young-gyu; Jang Jung-do; Song Jin-seon
- Producers: Kwon Mi-kyung; Moon Seok-hwan; Oh Kwang-hee
- Running time: 70 minutes.
- Production companies: Bon Factory Worldwide; Studio N

Original release
- Network: tvN
- Release: December 9, 2020 – February 4, 2021

True Beauty (Korean: 여신강림) is a South Korean television series starring Moon Ka-young, Cha Eun-woo, Hwang In-youp and Park Yoo-na. Based on the webtoon of the same title by Yaongyi, it centers on a high school girl who, after being bullied and discriminated against because of being perceived as ugly, masters the art of makeup to transform herself into a gorgeous "goddess". It aired on tvN from December 9, 2020 to February 4, 2021 every Wednesday and Thursday at 22:30 (KST). It was named the best Korean drama of 2021 by Forbes.

== Plot ==
Lim Ju-kyung is a high school student who has always had a complex attitude towards her appearance since childhood, since she was badly bullied by her classmates and told that she was ugly. Struggling with insecurity and ridicule, when her family must move and she transfers schools as a result, she decides to take the opportunity to escape her past and start fresh. To overcome her low self-esteem and avoid further bullying, she masters the art of makeup, using it to transform her appearance. Her excellent makeup skills enhance her beauty so much that people at her new school believe she is naturally stunning, earning her the title of a "goddess".

Before transferring, Ju-kyung had reached a breaking point due to relentless bullying that drove her to contemplate suicide from the ledge of a tower rooftop. At that time, she was pulled off the ledge by Lee Su-ho, a wealthy but cold high school student. However, since she was not wearing her glasses at the time, she couldn't see his face, and Lee Su-ho does not recognise her because of her new look.

At her new school, Ju-kyung crosses paths with Lee Su-ho again, but neither of them realises their past connection. Meanwhile, she also meets Han Seo-jun, a rebellious yet talented student, forming an interesting dynamic among the three. One day, while visiting a comic store near her house without makeup, she runs into Lee Su-ho. Terrified that he might discover her bare face, she panics. However, Lee Su-ho recognises her as the girl he once saved, and they slowly develop a friendship. As time passes, he discovers her true appearance, but instead of cutting her off, he accepts Ju-kyung as she is.

Alongside Lee Su-ho, Han Seo-jun, also befriends Ju-kyung. As he slowly develops feelings for her, it leads to a love triangle between the three. Through ups and downs throughout her high school life, Ju-kyung struggles to keep her bare face a secret, but eventually, the truth about her appearance is exposed. Despite facing initial embarrassment and fear, she grows stronger, learning to embrace herself. In the end, she pursues her dream of becoming a cosmetologist, turning her passion for makeup into a career and proving that beauty is about confidence rather than just appearance.

Through all the ups and downs, Lee Su-ho and Ju-kyung support each other and grow stronger together. Eventually, they find happiness in each other, cherishing their love and embracing their true selves, while Seo-jun gives up his feelings for Ju-Kyung.

== Cast ==
=== Main ===
- Moon Ga-young as Lim Ju-kyung
  - Lee Go-eun as young Ju-kyung

A newcomer student of Class 2-5 recently transferred to Saebom High School. Having been constantly discriminated by her family and bullied by her peers in previous school due to being perceived as ugly, she masters to wear makeup by binge-watching tutorial videos in the internet and her makeover proves to be transformative as she quickly rises to fame and her peers in new school call her a "goddess", unaware of her real appearance. Ju-kyung prefers reading horror comic books and listening to heavy metal music.

- Cha Eun-woo as Lee Su-ho
  - Lee Seung-woo as young Su-ho

A student of Class 2–5 in Saebom High School. He is very popular for his handsome looks and being the top of his class. His dysfunctional family and a tragic incident from a year ago have turned him into an ice-cold boy who hates being the center of attention. He is formerly best friends with Seo-jun. Su-ho shares Ju-kyung's penchant for horror comic books.

- Hwang In-youp as Han Seo-jun

A student of Class 2–5 in Saebom High School. Seo-jun is a handsome and equally-popular student at his school who, despite being tough-looking, is a kind, loving and soft person, especially to his mother and sister. He is formerly best friends with Su-ho and a former idol trainee, but a tragic incident a year ago leads to him abandoning his path to stardom and severing his friendship with Su-ho, with whom he has since become extremely hostile.

- Park Yoo-na as Kang Su-jin

A student of Class 2–5 in Saebom High School. She is Su-ho's childhood friend who becomes close friends with Ju-kyung, but is being forced by her parents to excel at school, and is always being compared with Su-ho.

=== Supporting ===
Lim Ju-kyung's family

- Jang Hye-jin as Hong Hyun-sook

Lim Jae-pil's wife and mother of Hee-kyung, Ju-kyung and Ju-young. She is the matriarch of the Lim family who owns a beauty shop named Pandora which is popular among older women.

- Park Ho-san as Lim Jae-pil

Hong Hyun-sook's husband and father of Hee-kyung, Ju-kyung and Ju-young. He lost a great sum of money to a dubious investment which leads to his family moving back to their old house.

- Im Se-mi as Lim Hee-kyung
  - Park Seo-kyung as young Hee-kyung (ep. 1)

Ju-kyung's older sister. She is adored by the family for being pretty and intelligent. She works at Move Entertainment and develops feelings for Han Joon-woo.

- Kim Min-gi as Lim Ju-young
  - Park Ju-hwan as young Ju-young (ep. 1)

Ju-kyung's younger brother. He harbors a crush on Go-woon after hearing her sing.

Lee Su-ho's family

- Jung Joon-ho as Lee Joo-heon

Su-ho's father. He is a famous actor and CEO of Move Entertainment who was once seen with another woman by young Suho the time his mother was ill, leading to a long-term misunderstanding and resentment from his son towards him.

Han Seo-jun's family

- Yeo Joo-ha as Han Go-woon

A student at Saebom High School and Seo-jun's younger sister. She has great singing talent, but is bullied by her peers for being perceived as ugly. She befriends Ju-kyung after Ju-kyung saves her from bullies.

- Park Hyun-jung as Lee Mi-hyang

Seo-jun and Go-woon's mother and an acquaintance of Hyun-sook. She suffers from an illness requiring a kidney transplant.

Kang Su-jin's family

- Seo Sang-won as Kang Jun-hyuk

Su-jin's father, who is a professor and doctor-in-charge of a medical school. He is teaching Su-jin to be competitive by mentally and physically abusing her.

- Yoo Dam-yeon as Kim Ji-yeon

Su-jin's mother. She is passive with her husband's abuse at first. She later divorces him and leaves Korea with Su-jin.

Saebom High School

- Oh Eui-shik as Han Joon-woo

The homeroom teacher of Class 2-5 and a literature teacher in Saebom High School. He falls in love with Hee-kyung.

- Kang Min-ah as Choi Soo-ah

A student of Class 2–5 in Saebom High School, Ju-kyung and Su-jin's best friend and classmate, and Tae-hoon's girlfriend.

- Lee Il-jun as Yoo Tae-hoon

A student of Class 2–5 in Saebom High School and Soo-ah's boyfriend. Tae-hoon often seeks Su-ho's approval and later befriends him.

- Lee Sang-jin as Ahn Hyun-gyu

A student of Class 2–5 in Saebom High School.

- Han Yi-young as Ha Ji-young

A student of Class 2–5 in Saebom High School.

- Lee Woo-je as Kim Cho-rong

A student in Saebom High School and Seo-jun's friend.

- Kim Hyun-ji as Kim Si-hyun

A student in Saebom High School.

- Kim Myung-ji as Jin Hee-jeong

A first-year student in Saebom High School and a webmaster of school's online community. She bullied Go-woon once.

- Kim Byung-chun as the vice-principal of Saebom High School.

Yongpa High School

- Shin Jae-hwi as Lee Sung-yong

A student in Yongpa High School. He is a bully who formerly acquainted with Seo-jun.

- Jeon Hye-won as Park Sae-mi

A student of Yongpa High School. A popular girl with pretty face, she used to bully Ju-kyung before she transferred to Saebom High School.

- Oh Yoo-jin as Joo Hye-min

A student in Yongpa High School who later transfers to Saebom High School after being bullied tremendously at her old school.

- Seo Hye-won as Park Ji-hee

A student in Yongpa High School and Park Sae-mi's friend.

Others

- Im Hyun-sung as Wang Ja

The owner of Prince Comics, a comic book store that Ju-kyung and Su-ho frequently visits.

- Park Young-soo as Columbus Park

A man who tricks Ju-kyung's father out of his money.

=== Special appearances ===
- Kang Chan-hee as Jung Se-yeon
  (eps. 1, 4–5, 11–12, 16)

Su-ho and Seo-jun's deceased best friend. Se-yeon was a member of a boy group under Move Entertainment. A victim of harsh online shaming and fake scandals, he committed suicide by jumping off a tall building. His tragic death becomes the center of the broken friendship between Seo-jun and Su-ho, Seo-jun's animosity towards Su-ho's father, and Su-ho's life of immense guilt.

- Go Woo-ri as Selena

A famous makeup-artist whom Ju-kyung idolizes and later works for.

- Lee Tae-ri as Wang Hyun-bin (ep. 1)

A handsome nutritionist of Yongpa High School's canteen whom Ju-kyung had a crush on.

- Ok Joo-ri as a neighbourhood woman (ep. 1)
- Cha Young-ok as a neighbourhood woman (eps. 1–2)
- Lee Jae-eun as Su-ho's housekeeper (ep. 3)
- Song Hoon as a history teacher (ep. 3)
- Uhm Tae-yoon as a customer (ep. 3)
- Kim Jeong-hak as Joo-heon's associate (ep. 3)
- Jang Young-hyun as a guy at the convenience store (ep. 3)
- Moon Hak-jin as a guy at the convenience store (ep. 3)
- Ham Tae-gyun as a guy at the convenience store (ep. 3)
- Kim Hye-yoon as Eun Dan-oh (ep. 4)

Baek Kyung's classmate and fiancée and Ha-ru's girlfriend from Extraordinary You, whom Suho mistakes as Jugyeong (Note: The character appears in a short crossover scene alluding Director Kim Sang-hyeop's previous work Extraordinary You, where the character originally appeared.)

- Lee Jae-wook as Baek Kyung (ep. 4)

Dan-oh's classmate and fiancé from Extraordinary You, whom Suho mistakes as Woo-hyun and Jugyeong's blind date.

- Jung Gun-joo as Ryu Hyung-jin (ep. 7)

A baseball star playing for Seonil High School who has a crush on Ju-kyung and asks her out.

- Woo Hyun as a camping site manager (ep. 8)
- Kim Jae-wook as MC Jaerong (ep. 8)

A recreation host.

- Jung Ye-nok as the head of imaginary bullies (ep. 9)
- Lee Han-wi as Min Jae-joon (ep. 13)

A plastic surgeon.

- Kim Young-dae as Oh Nam-joo (ep. 15) (Note: Kim Young-dae's cameo role alludes to his role as Oh Nam-joo in episode 32 of Director Kim Sang-hyeop's Extraordinary You.)

A stranger whom Ju-kyung runs into at the Namsan Tower, and she mistaken him as Su-ho.

- Im Da-young as Chae-ni (eps. 15–16)

A celebrity under Move Entertainment.

== Episodes ==
No.	Title	Directed by	Written by	Original release date	South Korea viewers (millions)
1	"Episode 1"	Kim Sang-hyeop	Lee Si-eun	December 9, 2020	1.083
Teased by her family and bullied by her peers because of her looks, 18-year-old high school student Lim Ju-kyung contemplates suicide and goes to the rooftop of a high-rise building, but she stops herself at the last minute and decides to move on with her life. Just in time, a handsome boy, Lee Su-ho, pulls her away from danger and tells her to consider how her loved ones will suffer had she jumped to her death. Days after, she starts learning how to use makeup through tutorial videos on the Internet and masters the art just before transferring to her new school. The makeover proves to be transformative as her peers call her a "goddess", however Lee Su-ho's presence at her new school as well as her brother's blackmail threaten to reveal her previous poor looks.
2	"Episode 2"	Kim Sang-hyeop	Lee Si-eun	December 10, 2020	1.000
After encountering her handsome classmate Lee Su-ho at the comic book store in her bare face, Ju-kyung struggles with keeping her true face a secret to her peers. She realizes later that Su-ho does not recognize her yet at school as the ugly girl from the comic book store. Meanwhile, tough guy Han Seo-jun returns to school and recognizes Ju-kyung to be the girl who ran away with his helmet.
3	"Episode 3"	Kim Sang-hyeop	Lee Si-eun	December 16, 2020	1.162
Su-ho reveals to Ju-kyung that he recognizes her. Ju-kyung offers herself to Su-ho as his errand girl in return for keeping her true face a secret from their peers. Later, she searches her bedroom for Seo-jun's helmet but it is nowhere to be found.
4	"Episode 4"	Kim Sang-hyeop	Lee Si-eun	December 17, 2020	1.178
Reminded of Jung Se-yeon's tragic death, Seo-jun picks up a fight against Su-ho at the cafeteria, with the innocent Ju-kyung in the middle of the clash. The incident puts Ju-kyung in an uncomfortable position as rumors of a love triangle between her and the boys spread in the school. Su-ho becomes bothered when Soo-ah arranges a blind date for Ju-kyung.
5	"Episode 5"	Kim Sang-hyeop	Lee Si-eun	December 23, 2020	1.095
Ju-kyung runs into Seo-jun's younger sister Go-woon being bullied by her fellow music club members for taking the lead role despite being ugly. Reminded of her past suffering, she defends Go-woon against the bullies and uses her makeup skills to transform her just before the club's performance during the school festival. As Seo-jun's rebuke and a posthumously released song remind, Su-ho of his tragic past, Ju-kyung recognizes the boy who rescued her at the rooftop.
6	"Episode 6"	Kim Sang-hyeop	Lee Si-eun	December 24, 2020	1.086
Despite Su-ho's loathing, his celebrity father Lee Joo-heon goes to school for a parent-teacher conference and gains a lot of attention. Seo-jun expresses his gratitude to Ju-kyung for helping his younger sister. Ju-kyung runs into an unlikely visitor at the Im family's residence. One day, she bumps into the person she fears meeting the most and is kidnapped later on by Seo-jun's enemies. Seo-jun and Su-ho team up to rescue her as Soo-jin, Soo-ah and Tae-hoon discover where Ju-kyung is held captive.
7	"Episode 7"	Kim Sang-hyeop	Lee Si-eun	January 6, 2021	1.154
Ju-kyung and the rescue party receive punishments at school for being involved in the brawl against Seo-jun's enemies. Soo-jin is in distress as her grades drop after the exams. Su-ho gets upset as a popular baseball player gets attracted to Ju-kyung and starts to pursue her. Su-ho later learns a few dating tricks from Tae-hoon.
8	"Episode 8"	Kim Sang-hyeop	Lee Si-eun	January 7, 2021	.973
The students of Saebom High School go to a school trip in the countryside. Ju-kyung tries to keep herself distant from Su-ho, while Seo-jun makes himself closer to Ju-kyung. Su-ho plans to confess to Ju-kyung but seems to lose his chances.
9	"Episode 9"	Kim Sang-hyeop	Lee Si-eun	January 13, 2021	1.361
After Su-ho confessed his feelings for her, a thrilled Ju-kyung accidentally reveals her bare face to Soo-jin. As Ju-kyung wishes, Soo-jin would keep her real face a secret from everybody, she also asks Su-ho if they could be clandestinely dating because of her fear of retaliation from Su-ho's fans. Ju-kyung attempts part-time working as a model with Seo-jun, while Su-ho and Soo-jin meet with their high-class families.
10	"Episode 10"	Kim Sang-hyeop	Lee Si-eun	January 14, 2021	1.120
Lim Jae-pil discovers that Su-ho is already dating his daughter Ju-kyung. After Soo-jin opens up to, Ju-kyung about her feelings for Su-ho, Ju-kyung starts to have qualms about her and Su-ho's secret relationship. The competition between Su-ho and Seo-jun heats up when they are, by chance, both invited to the Im family's residence. At Move Entertainment, Hee-kyung discovers that the late Se-yeon's song has been used as a debut single of another artist without due permission.
11	"Episode 11"	Kim Sang-hyeop	Lee Si-eun	January 20, 2021	1.216
Su-ho and Seo-jun are caught in a car crash moments after Su-ho discovers to his shock the horrible truth behind the fake scandals that led to Se-yeon's suicide. Ju-kyung opens up to Soo-jin about her relationship with Su-ho. Joo Hye-min, a former classmate of Ju-kyung from her previous school, transfers to Saebom High School to escape from the same bullies that once tormented Ju-kyung.
12	"Episode 12"	Kim Sang-hyeop	Lee Si-eun	January 21, 2021	1.107
Joo-heon steps down from his position after revealing to the public the truth about Se-yeon's death and the plagiarized song. After recovering from their injuries, the reconciled, Su-ho and Seo-jun visit Se-yeon's grave together. Ju-kyung starts questioning how long she can maintain her disguise and popularity as she keeps running into Hye-min at school, ranks first in an online beauty contest of which she is an unwilling contestant and becomes the school promotion model.
13	"Episode 13"	Kim Sang-hyeop	Lee Si-eun	January 27, 2021	1.215
Judgmental eyes and a bunch of bullies target the distressed Ju-kyung after the truth of her makeup-less face gets revealed in social media. As Ju-kyung runs away from her new tormentors, Su-ho tries hard to search for her while Seo-jun deduces who is the culprit behind the malicious online exposé. Class 2-5 gets reprimanded for being insensitive to Ju-kyung's plight. Ju-kyung's mother finally realizes the reason behind her daughter's obsession with makeup.
14	"Episode 14"	Kim Sang-hyeop	Lee Si-eun	January 28, 2021	1.143
Ju-kyung resolves go to school in her bare, makeup-less face and makes her relationship with Su-ho known to everyone. She reconciles with Soo-ah who felt betrayed for not knowing the truth sooner. Su-ho tries to convince Soo-jin to apologize to Ju-kyung, knowing that something other than mere jealousy must have brought her to maligning Ju-kyung. A shocking news from overseas puts Ju-kyung and Su-ho's relationship to the test.
15	"Episode 15"	Kim Sang-hyeop	Lee Si-eun	February 3, 2021	1.353
The hardships of a long-distance relationship pushes Su-ho to break up with Ju-kyung. Two years later, Ju-kyung and her classmates have graduated from Saebom High School. Ju-kyung works as a makeup assistant while Seo-jun is nearing towards his debut as a singer. After Seo-jun's confession of his feelings for her, a surprise awaits Ju-kyung at Namsan Tower under the first shower of snow.
16	"Episode 16"	Kim Sang-hyeop	Lee Si-eun	February 4, 2021	1.270
Ju-kyung and Su-ho are reunited as Seo-jun come to terms with his unrequited love. Soo-jin, free from her father's abuse, formally apologizes to Ju-kyung. Su-ho offers the final version of Se-yeon's song for posthumous publishing, to be performed by Seo-jun on his debut. At the ending, Su-ho and Ju-kyung share a kiss at Prince Comics, where they first met.

== Production ==
In July 2019, it was announced that Line Webtoon's True Beauty would be adapted into a television series. In August 2020, the production team confirmed the casting of Moon Ga-young, Cha Eun-woo and Hwang In-youp in the lead roles. The first script reading session was held in October 2020. Filming was temporarily halted in late December 2020 after Kim Byung-chun tested positive for COVID-19. The first stills from filming were released on November 10, 2020, one month prior to the series premiere.

=== Male main character inspiration ===
In an interview, Yaongyi revealed that she created and drew the male main character Lee Su-ho with actor and singer Cha Eun-woo in mind.

== Release ==
The series was originally made available for streaming through Viu and Rakuten Viki. It became available on Amazon Prime Video from October 21, 2021. In 2023, the series became available on Netflix in selected territories.

== Original soundtrack ==
True Beauty: Original Soundtrack

Soundtrack album by Various artists
- Released: February 5, 2021
- Genres: Soundtrack; K-pop
- Length: 118:32
- Languages: Korean; English
- Label: Stone Music Entertainment

=== True Beauty: Original Soundtrack ===
The following is the official track list of True Beauty: Original Soundtrack album, which was released by Stone Music Entertainment on February 5, 2021. The tracks with no indicated lyricists and composers are the drama's musical score; the artists indicated for these tracks are the tracks' composers themselves.

The album peaked on number 5 on weekly Gaon Album Chart. As of March 2021, 40,786 copies have been sold.

CD 1
No.	Title	Lyrics	Music	Artist	Length
1.	"Call Me Maybe"	KYRIELLE (FAB); IKEK (FAB); PiRi BOi (FAB); Han Hye-ji; Lee Hoo-sang	KYRIELLE (FAB); IKEK (FAB); PiRi BOi (FAB); Han Hye-ji; Lee Hoo-sang	SAya	3:21
2.	"I'm In the Mood for Dancing (Note: Original song by The Nolans, released in 1979.)"	Ben Findon; Mike Myers; Robert Puzey	Ben Findon; Mike Myers; Robert Puzey	Yuju (GFriend)	3:30
3.	"Happy Ending"	Dong Woo-seok	Dong Woo-seok	Car, the Garden	3:02
4.	"I'm Missing You"	DOKO	DOKO	Sunjae	3:02
5.	"Starlight" (그리움, lit. "Longing")	Jung Goo-hyun	Jung Goo-hyun	Chani (SF9)	4:23
6.	"Fall in You"	DOKO	DOKO	Ha Sung-woon (Hotshot)	3:46
7.	"Before Today Is Over" (오늘이 지나기 전에)	Kid Wine	TOIL; Kid Wine	Hyojin (ONF)	2:35
8.	"Milky Way"			Park Se-joon; Na Sang-jin	2:05
9.	"Suspension from School"			Lee Nyum	2:06
10.	"Paper Flower"			Park Se-joon; Woo Ji-hoon	1:45
11.	"Float About"			Park Se-joon; Yoo Hee-hyun	2:25
12.	"Stop It"			Park Se-joon; Na Sang-jin	1:49
13.	"Honey Drop"			Kim Dong-hyuk; Choi Moon-suk	1:43
14.	"I Warned"			Park Se-joon; Woo Ji-hoon	1:56
15.	"Strange Makeup"			Park Se-joon; Kim Min-ji	1:46
16.	"Two Tone Sox"			Park Se-joon; Song Jae-kyung	2:20
17.	"The Real World in Fairy Tales"			Lee Nyum	2:39
18.	"At The End of Day"			Park Se-joon; Na Sang-jin	2:23
19.	"Beginning of the Day"			Park Se-joon; Kim Tae-hwan	2:20
20.	"Into the Sorrow"			Park Se-joon; Woo Ji-hoon	2:45
21.	"Bubble Up"			Park Se-joon; Na Yoon-shik	1:22
22.	"My New Birth"			Lee Nyum	2:40
23.	"Trouble Again"			Song Jin-suk; Hwang Seung-pil	1:46
24.	"Different Life"			Park Se-joon; Na Sang-jin	1:54
25.	"Feel Dizzy"			Park Se-joon; Yoo Hee-hyun	2:05
Total length:					61:28

CD 2
No.	Title	Lyrics	Music	Artist	Length
1.	"Love So Fine"	Kim Tae-young; December 32; Llwyd	Kim Tae-young; December 32	Cha Eun-woo (Astro)	3:10
2.	"It Starts Today" (오늘부터 시작인걸)	Park Se-joon; Han Joon	Jung Goo-hyun	Hwang In-youp	4:04
3.	"How Do You Do"	Park Se-joon; Woo Ji-hoon	Park Se-joon; Woo Ji-hoon	Chani (SF9)	4:17
4.	"Tears of the Rain"			Lee Nyum	2:34
5.	"You and My Secret"			Park Se-joon	2:50
6.	"Love Poem"			Park Se-joon; Kim Min-ji	2:12
7.	"Do Not Cheat Again"			Park Se-joon; Woo Ji-hoon	1:31
8.	"Soft Ice Cream"			Park Se-joon; Kim Tae-hwan	1:52
9.	"Rockin Street"			Park Se-joon; Song Jae-kyung	2:09
10.	"Mehlong"			Kim Dong-hyuk; Choi Moon-suk	1:48
11.	"Venus"			Park Se-joon; Kim Min-ji	2:09
12.	"No Makeup"			Park Se-joon; Kim Ji-ae	2:06
13.	"This Life is Ruined"			Park Se-joon	2:03
14.	"BoomBoom"			Song Jin-suk; Hwang Seung-pil	1:49
15.	"Mystery Box"			Park Se-joon; Na Sang-jin	1:35
16.	"I am Screwed"			Park Se-joon; Kim Tae-hwan	1:36
17.	"Ignore"			Park Se-joon; Kim Min-ji	3:13
18.	"Are You Happy"			Park Se-joon; Yoo Hee-hyun	1:11
19.	"A Proud Man"			Park Se-joon; Song Jin-suk	1:13
20.	"My Fantastic Star"			Lee Nyum	2:21
21.	"All Day"			Park Se-joon; Woo Ji-hoon	2:10
22.	"Regret"			Park Se-joon; Na Yoon-shik	3:42
23.	"Love Inside"			Kim Dong-hyuk	2:14
24.	"Electric Soul"			Park Se-joon; Na Sang-jin	1:32
25.	"Become Goddess"			Park Se-joon; Woo Ji-hoon	1:43
Total length:					57:04

=== Singles ===
The following is the track list of singles from True Beauty: Original Soundtrack.

Part 1

Released on December 10, 2020
No.	Title	Lyrics	Music	Artist	Length
1.	"Call Me Maybe"	KYRIELLE (FAB); IKEK (FAB); PiRi BOi (FAB); Han Hye-ji; Lee Hoo-sang	KYRIELLE (FAB); IKEK (FAB); PiRi BOi (FAB); Han Hye-ji; Lee Hoo-sang	SAya	3:23
2.	"Call Me Maybe" (Inst.)		KYRIELLE (FAB); IKEK (FAB); PiRi BOi (FAB); Han Hye-ji; Lee Hoo-sang		3:23
Total length:					6:46

Part 2

Released on December 17, 2020
No.	Title	Lyrics	Music	Artist	Length
1.	"I'm In the Mood for Dancing"	Ben Findon; Mike Myers; Robert Puzey	Ben Findon; Mike Myers; Robert Puzey	Yuju (GFriend)	3:30
2.	"I'm In the Mood for Dancing" (Inst.)		Ben Findon; Mike Myers; Robert Puzey		3:30
Total length:					7:00

Part 3

Released on January 7, 2021
No.	Title	Lyrics	Music	Artist	Length
1.	"Happy Ending"	Dong Woo-seok	Dong Woo-seok	Car, the Garden	3:03
2.	"Happy Ending" (Inst.)		Dong Woo-seok		3:03
Total length:					6:06

Part 4

Released on January 13, 2021
No.	Title	Lyrics	Music	Artist	Length
1.	"I'm Missing You"	DOKO	DOKO	Sunjae	3:03
2.	"I'm Missing You" (Inst.)		DOKO		3:03
Total length:					6:06

Part 5

Released on January 14, 2021
No.	Title	Lyrics	Music	Artist	Length
1.	"Starlight" (그리움, lit. "Longing")	Jung Goo-hyun	Jung Goo-hyun	Chani (SF9)	4:24
2.	"Starlight" (Inst.)		Jung Goo-hyun		4:24
Total length:					8:48

Part 6

Released on January 21, 2021
No.	Title	Lyrics	Music	Artist	Length
1.	"Fall in You"	DOKO	DOKO	Ha Sung-woon (Hotshot)	3:46
2.	"Fall in You" (Inst.)		DOKO		3:46
Total length:					7:32

Part 7

Released on January 28, 2021
No.	Title	Lyrics	Music	Artist	Length
1.	"Before Today Is Over" (오늘이 지나기 전에)	Kid Wine	TOIL; Kid Wine	Hyojin (ONF)	2:36
2.	"Before Today Is Over" (Inst.)		TOIL; Kid Wine		2:36
Total length:					5:12

Part 8

Released on February 3, 2021
No.	Title	Lyrics	Music	Artist	Length
1.	"Love So Fine"	Kim Tae-young; December 32; Llwyd	Kim Tae-young; December 32	Cha Eun-woo (Astro)	3:11
2.	"Love So Fine" (Inst.)		Kim Tae-young; December 32		3:11
Total length:					6:22

== Viewership ==
True Beauty : South Korea viewers per episode (thousands)

Season	Episode number																Average
Season	1	2	3	4	5	6	7	8	9	10	11	12	13	14	15	16	Average
1	1083	1000	1162	1178	1095	1086	1154	973	1361	1120	1216	1107	1215	1143	1353	1270	1157

Source: Audience measurement performed nationwide by Nielsen Korea

Average TV viewership ratings
Ep.	Original broadcast date	Average audience share (Nielsen Korea)	
Ep.	Original broadcast date	Nationwide	Seoul
1	December 9, 2020	3.573% (2nd)	4.056% (2nd)
2	December 10, 2020	3.626% (1st)	3.963% (1st)
3	December 16, 2020	3.813% (2nd)	4.711% (2nd)
4	December 17, 2020	3.586% (1st)	3.824% (1st)
5	December 23, 2020	3.859% (2nd)	4.293% (2nd)
6	December 24, 2020	3.333% (1st)	3.724% (1st)
7	January 6, 2021	3.892% (2nd)	4.198% (2nd)
8	January 7, 2021	2.909% (1st)	3.003% (1st)
9	January 13, 2021	4.265% (2nd)	4.938% (2nd)
10	January 14, 2021	3.411% (1st)	3.870% (1st)
11	January 20, 2021	3.850% (2nd)	4.303% (2nd)
12	January 21, 2021	3.418% (1st)	4.069% (1st)
13	January 27, 2021	4.000% (2nd)	4.547% (2nd)
14	January 28, 2021	4.125% (1st)	4.802% (2nd)
15	February 3, 2021	4.579% (2nd)	5.371% (2nd)
16	February 4, 2021	4.458% (1st)	5.087% (1st)
Average		3.794%	4.297%
In the table above, the blue numbers represent the lowest ratings and the red numbers represent the highest ratings.; This drama airs on a cable channel/pay TV which normally has a relatively smaller audience compared to free-to-air TV/public broadcasters (KBS, SBS, MBC and EBS).; No episode aired on December 30 and 31 due to the broadcast of a special year-end holiday program.

== Awards and nominations ==
Name of the award ceremony, year presented, category, nominee of the award, and the result of the nomination
Award ceremony	Year	Category	Nominee / Work	Result	Ref.
Anugerah Drama Sangat (Note: Anugerah Drama Sangat is a Malaysian TV awards ceremony by TV3 that honors excellence in local dramas, recognizing actors, directors, writers, producers, and other contributors.)	2023	Oppa Pilihan Tonton	Cha Eun-woo	Won	
Asia Artist Awards	2021	Emotive Award - Actor	Cha Eun-woo	Won	
Asia Artist Awards	2021	Emotive Award - Actress	Moon Ga-young	Won	
Asian Culture Awards	2020	Best Korean Actor	Cha Eun-woo	Nominated	
Asian Culture Awards	2020	Best Korean Actress	Moon Ga-young	Nominated	
Asian Culture Awards	2020	Best Korean Drama	True Beauty	Nominated	
Asian Culture Awards	2020	Best Korean Rising Star	Hwang In-yeop	Nominated	
Brand Customer Loyalty Awards (Note: Co-organized by the Korean Customers Council and Brand Keys, this event recognizes the most influential brands in society and culture, as determined through consumer research.)	2021	Best Idol-Actor Award	Cha Eun-woo	Won	
Brand Customer Loyalty Awards	2021	Best Rookie Actor	Hwang In-youp	Won	
Brand of the Year Awards (Note: Established in 2003, the Brand of the Year Awards is an awards ceremony based on nationwide surveys hosted by the Korea Consumer Brand Committee and organized by the Korea Consumer Forum.)	2021	Actor of the Year (Idol) Award	Cha Eun-woo	Won	
Indonesian Hallyu Fans Choice Awards	2021	K-Drama of the Year	True Beauty	Won	

=== Listicle ===
Publisher	Year	Listicle	Placement	Ref.
Forbes	2021	20 Best Korean Dramas Of 2021	1st	
KOFICE	2023	Korean Content OTT Ranking	3rd	
Marie Claire	2023	25 Best K-Dramas on Viki	3rd	
Ministry of Culture, Sports and Tourism	2023	K-Drama Overseas Hallyu Status	9th	
Ministry of Culture, Sports and Tourism	2024	K-Drama Overseas Hallyu Status	4th	
