= Kang Chan-hee =

South Korean singer and actor (born 2000)

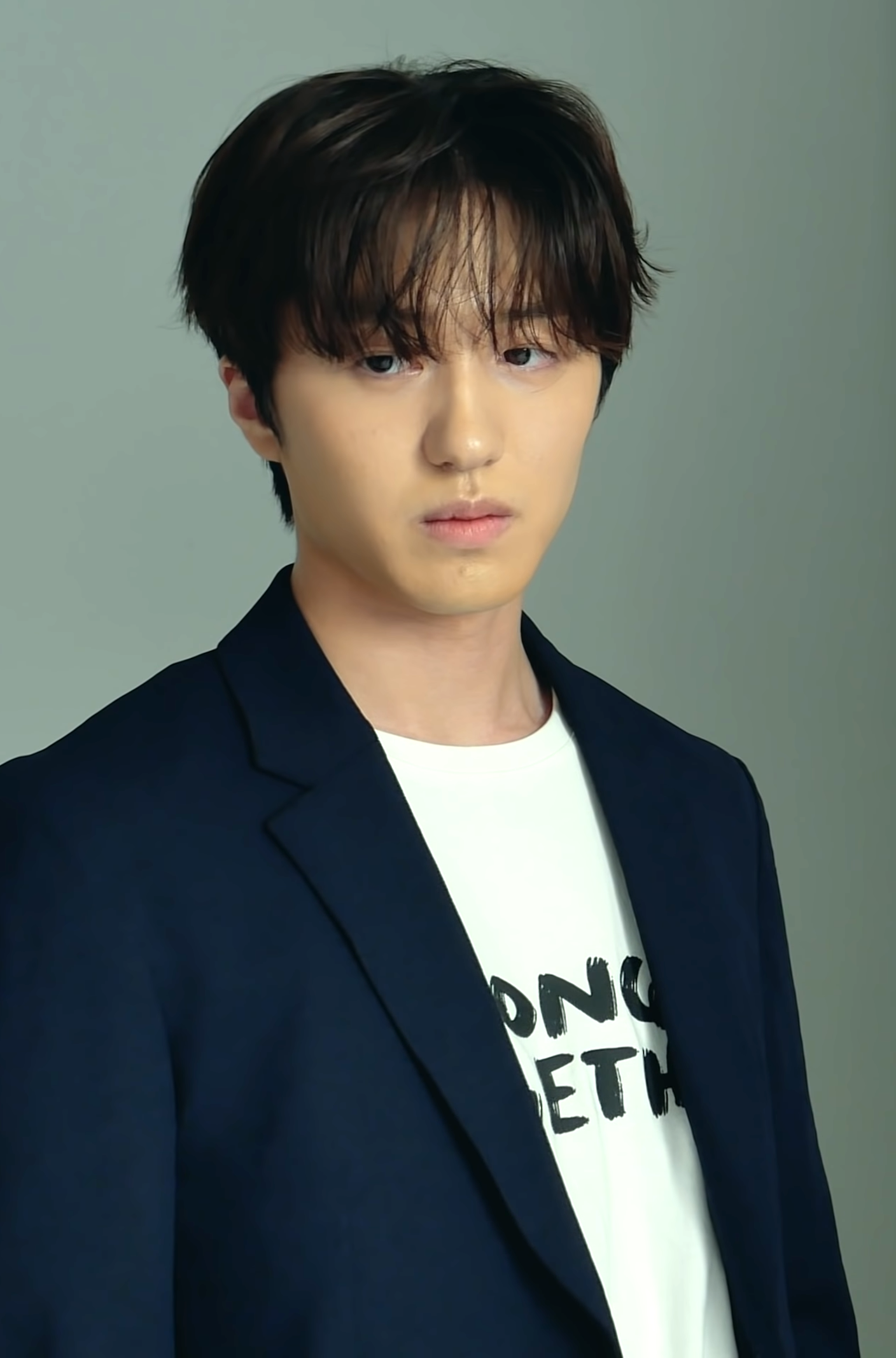
- Kang in 2021
- Born: January 17, 2000 (age 26); Seo-gu, Daejeon, South Korea
- Education: School of Performing Arts Seoul
- Occupations: Singer; actor; dancer
- Years active: 2009–present
- Musical career
- Genre: K-pop
- Years active: 2016–present
- Label: FNC
- Member of: SF9

Korean name
- Hangul: 강찬희
- Hanja: 姜澯熙
- RR: Gang Chanhui
- MR: Kang Ch'anhŭi

Kang Chan-hee (Korean: 강찬희; born January 17, 2000), also known by his stage name Chani, is a South Korean singer and actor. He began his career as a child actor, in the television dramas Listen to My Heart (2011), The Innocent Man (2012), The Queen's Classroom (2013), interactive drama Click Your Heart (2016), crime drama Signal (2016), and high-rated drama Sky Castle (2018). In 2015, he was introduced as one of the first members of NEOZ, which was the first group of FNC Entertainment's pre-debut team Neoz School. He debuted in October 2016 with the boy group SF9 and the single "Fanfare".

Kang's best-known acting role was his part in the 2018-19 hit television drama Sky Castle, where he played the role of Hwang Woo-joo, a smart and sweet high school student who lives in a high-end residential area called Sky Castle. It has also gained him a lot of fame and popularity.

== Discography ==
=== Soundtrack appearances ===
Title	Year	Peak position	Album
Title	Year	KOR	Album
"Starlight" (그리움)	2021	— (Note: "Starlight" did not enter Gaon Digital Chart, but peaked at position 31 and 25 on component Download Chart and BGM Chart, respectively.)	True Beauty OST
"How Do You Do"	2021	— (Note: "How Do You Do" did not enter Gaon Digital Chart, but peaked at position 122 on component Download Chart.)	True Beauty OST
"Shining Star"	2022	—	Miracle OST
"Forever Love"	2022	—	Miracle OST
"Milky Way" (with Hwiyoung)	2022	—	Miracle OST
"—" denotes releases that did not chart or were not released in that region.

== Filmography ==
Key
†	Denotes films that have not yet been released

=== Film ===
Year	Title	Role	Ref.
2016	Familyhood	Hyun-bin	
2017	The King's Case Note	King Yejong (Young)	
2019	The First Issue	Hyun-jun	
2021	The Gossip	Jung-seok	
2021	White Day: The Labyrinth	Hee-min	
2026	Method Acting	Jung Tae-min	

=== Television series ===
Year	Title	Role	Notes	Ref.
2009	Queen Seondeok	Hwarang		
2009	Three Brothers	Kim Sung-tae		
2011	Listen to My Heart	Cha Dong-joo (Young)		
2011	Garden of Heaven	Shin Seung-woo		
2012	To the Beautiful You	Kang Tae-joon (Young)		
2012	The Innocent Man	Kang Ma-ru (Young)		
2013	The Queen's Classroom	Kim Do-jin		
2015	Splendid Politics	Ja-gyung (Young)		
2016	Signal	Park Sun-woo		
2016	Click Your Heart	Kang Chan-hee		
2018	Coffee House 4.0	Do-yoon	Cameo (Ep. 8)	
2018–2019	Sky Castle	Hwang Woo-joo		
2020	Once Again	Choi Ji-won	Cameo (Ep. 59–66, 68)	
2020	True Beauty	Jung Se-yeon	Cameo (Ep. 1, 4–5, 11, 12, 16)	
2021	Must You Go?	Park Yeon		
2021	Imitation	Lee Eun-jo		
2022	Under the Queen's Umbrella	Prince Ui-seong		

=== Web series ===
Year	Title	Role	Ref.
2019	Love In Your Taste	Yoon Dan	
2021	Jinx	Gyu-han	
2022	Miracle	Louis	
2025	The Scandal of Chunhwa	Jang-won	
2026	The Scandal	In-ho	

=== Television shows ===
Year	Title	Role	Notes	Ref.
2016	d.o.b (Dance or Band)	Contestant		
2021	Kingdom: Legendary War	Contestant	Survival Show as SF9	
2021–2022	Teacher of Narat	Teacher		

=== Hosting ===
Year	Title	Notes	Ref.
2019–2021	Show! Music Core	February 16, 2019 – July 17, 2021	
2022	2022 KBS Entertainment Awards	with Seol In-ah and Moon Se-yoon	

== Awards and nominations ==
Name of the award ceremony, year presented, category, nominee of the award, and the result of the nomination
Award ceremony	Year	Category	Nominee / Work	Result	Ref.
APAN Music Awards	2020	Entertainer of the Year – Male	Kang Chan-hee	Nominated	
Brand of the Year Awards	2021	Male Idol Actor of the Year	Kang Chan-hee	Nominated	
MBC Entertainment Awards	2020	Rookie Award in Variety Category – Male	Show! Music Core	Nominated	
Soompi Awards	2019	Best Idol Actor Award	Sky Castle	Nominated	
