= Choi Yu-ju =

South Korean singer and actress (born 1997)

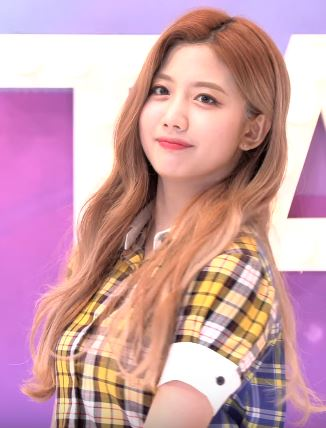
- Choi in June 2019
- Born: March 5, 1997 (age 29); South Korea
- Occupations: Singer; actress
- Years active: 2019–present
- Musical career
- Genres: K-pop
- Instrument: Vocals
- Labels: FNC; FNC W
- Formerly of: Cherry Bullet

Korean name
- Hangul: 최유주
- RR: Choe Yuju
- MR: Ch'oe Yuju

Choi Yu-ju (Korean: 최유주), known mononymously as Yuju, is a South Korean singer and actress who works with FNC Entertainment. She is a former member of the South Korean girl group Cherry Bullet.

== Career ==
Before her debut, Choi appeared in BTS's "Love Yourself" Highlight Reel. On August 24, 2017, she was selected as a exclusive model of SMART School Uniforms alongside labelmate trainee Jiwon, which began on their marketing activities in September.

On November 24, 2018, Choi was introduced as a member of the upcoming girl group through Mnet's reality show Insider Channel Cherry Bullet. They debuted with a single album, Let's Play Cherry Bullet was released on January 21, 2019. Choi made her acting debut in the web series Be My Boyfriend which premiered on February 25, 2021.

On October 1, 2021, Choi joined the KBS1 drama The All-Round Wife, which was her debut in terrestrial drama. The same year, Choi also appeared in the KakaoTV's series Jinx, along with fellow band member Bora.

On September 20, 2022, Choi made her first leading role in the fantasy web series My 20th Twenty which premiered on April 21, 2023. On October 17, 2023, Choi was cast in the SBS television series The Escape of the Seven.

On April 22, 2024, FNC Entertainment announced that the group had officially disbanded. Choi will remain under FNC for individual activities. On December 11, Choi was cast in the ENA television series Namib. Choi made her film debut in a teen romance film Everyday We Are, which was released on March 4, 2026.

== Discography ==
=== Soundtrack appearances ===
List of soundtrack appearances, showing year released and album name
Title	Year	Album
"Flower Way"	2024	Namib OST

== Filmography ==
=== Film ===
Year	Title	Role	Ref.
2026	Everyday We Are	Kim Joo-yeon	

=== Television series ===
Year	Title	Role	Notes	Ref.
2021–2022	The All-Round Wife	Gong Ju-ah		
2023–2024	The Escape of the Seven	Song Ji-sun / Michelle	Season 1–2	
2024–2025	Namib	Kyung Ha-na		
2025	Spring of Youth	Kim Bom's acquaintance	Cameo	
2026	Our Sticky Love	Min Su-ji		

=== Web series ===
Year	Title	Role	Ref.
2021	Be My Boyfriend	Seong Han-na	
2021	Jinx	Su-jin	
2023	My 20th Twenty	Kang So-won	

=== Web shows ===
Year	Title	Role	Ref.
2018–2019	Insider Channel Cherry Bullet	Cast member	

=== Music video appearances ===
Year	Song Title	Artist	Ref.
2017	"Someone to Love"	Honeyst	
2017	"Love Yourself"	BTS	

== Accolades ==
Name of the award ceremony, year presented, category, nominee of the award, and the result of the nomination
Award ceremony	Year	Category	Nominee / Work	Result	Ref.
SBS Drama Awards	2024	Best New Actress	The Escape of the Seven	Won	
