= Huh Ji-won =

South Korean singer and actress (born 2000)

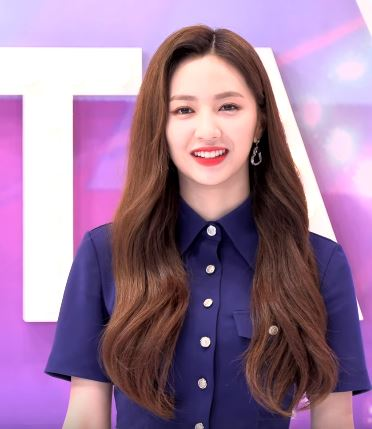
- Huh in 2019
- Born: September 4, 2000 (age 26); Seoul, South Korea
- Occupations: Model; actress; singer
- Years active: 2011–present
- Agent: B.able Company
- Musical career
- Genre: K-pop
- Instrument: Vocals
- Years active: 2019–2024; 2026–present
- Labels: FNC; FNC W
- Formerly of: Cherry Bullet

Korean name
- Hangul: 허지원
- RR: Heo Jiwon
- MR: Hŏ Chiwŏn

Huh Ji-won (Korean: 허지원), known mononymously as Jiwon, is a South Korean model, actress and singer. She is a former member of the South Korean girl group Cherry Bullet, and made her solo debut on August 5, 2026, with the single album The Calling.

== Life and career ==
=== 2000–2017: Early life and career beginnings ===
Huh was born on September 4, 2000, in Seoul, South Korea. In 2011, she participated in the first season of K-pop Star. However, she was eliminated early during auditions. She appeared in several music videos during her spent trainee in Nega Network. On August 24, 2017, she was selected as an exclusive model of SMART School Uniforms, alongside fellow FNC Entertainment trainee Choi Yu-ju, which began on their marketing activities in September.

=== 2019–present: Debut with Cherry Bullet, acting debut, Girls Planet 999 and Queendom Puzzle ===
Huh was introduced as a member of the upcoming girl group through Mnet's reality show Insider Channel Cherry Bullet. They debuted with a single album, Let's Play Cherry Bullet on January 21, 2019. Huh made her acting debut in a romance web series Heart Way, which premiered on November 30, 2021. On July 7, she participated on Mnet's reality survival show Girls Planet 999. On September 24, she eliminated in episode 8 with her final rank being K16.

On October 26, 2022, Huh starred in a youth web series Disarming Romance. On February 14, 2023, Huh starred in the mystery thriller film Cornell's Box. On May 19, 2023, she participated on Mnet's reality show Queendom Puzzle. However, she was eliminated in episode 10 and ranked 15th. On September 20, 2023, Huh joined in the Lifetime web series Love Andante.

On April 22, 2024, FNC Entertainment confirmed that Huh decided not to renew her contract, along with other members, and Cherry Bullet was officially disbanded. On September 13, 2024, it was announced that Huh would star in the short film The Moment I Become You, alongside Park San-ha. On April 25, 2025, Huh was selected as an exclusive model for the Japanese fashion media Kobunsha's JJ magazine to commemorate its 50th anniversary. On May 13, 2025, Huh signed a contract with B.able Company for global activities.

On July 28, 2026, B.able Company announced that Huh would be making her solo debut with her first single album The Calling, which was released on August 5 with the lead single "Call Me Up". On October 7, Huh made her soundtrack appearance "Drawn In Your Light" for ReelShort's short-from drama Mafia King: A Secret Contract Between an Ordinary College Student and the Mafia.

== Ambassadorship ==
In December 2025, Huh was appointed as the first brand ambassador for the fashion label ABEEHUMS and participated in an official collaboration event held in Jongno.

On April 10, 2026, Huh has been selected as an ambassador for the hangover remedy brand Judang-ui Bigyeol alongside Super Junior's Shindong.

== Discography ==
=== Single albums ===
List of single albums, showing selected details
Title	Details
The Calling	Released: August 5, 2026; Label: B.able Company; Formats: CD, digital download, streaming; Track listing: 1. "Call Me Up"; 2. "Every Moment"; 3. "Call Me Up" (Inst.); 4. "Every Moment" (Inst.)

=== Singles ===
List of singles, showing year released and name of the album
Title	Year	Album
"Call Me Up"	2026	The Calling

=== Soundtrack appearances ===
List of soundtrack appearances, showing year released and album name
Title	Year	Album
"Drawn In Your Light"	2026	Mafia King OST

== Filmography ==
=== Film ===
Year	Title	Role	Notes	Ref.
2022	Midnight Horror: Six Nights	Soo-young	Segment: Order	
2025	Cornell's Box	Yoo-rim		
TBA	The Moment I Become You	Eun-jung	Short film	

=== Web series ===
Year	Title	Role	Notes	Ref.
2021	Replay: The Moment	Restaurant employee	Cameo (episode 10)	
2021	Heart Way	Han Ji-an		
2022	Disarming Romance	Kim Ha-na		
2024	Love Andante	Kim Joo-hee		

=== Television shows ===
Year	Title	Role	Notes	Ref.
2021	Girls Planet 999	Contestant	Eliminated in second elimination round	
2023	Queendom Puzzle	Contestant	Finished 15th	

=== Web shows ===
Year	Title	Role	Ref.
2018–2019	Insider Channel Cherry Bullet	Cast member	

=== Music video appearances ===
Year	Song Title	Artist	Ref.
2012	"Reminiscence"	Super Junior-K.R.Y.	
2012	"White Love"	Starship Planet	
2018	"Let's go see the stars"	Park Bo-gum	
