= The Escape of the Seven =

South Korean television series

- Promotional poster for season 2
- Also known as: 7 Escape (Season 1); The Escape of the Seven: War for Survival (Season 1); Reborn 7 (Season 2); The Escape of the Seven: Resurrection (Season 2)
- Hangul: 7인의 탈출
- Hanja: 七人의 脫出
- Lit.: The Escape of 7
- RR: 7inui talchul
- MR: 7inŭi t'alch'ul
- Genre: Revenge drama; Picaresque; Crime; Thriller
- Written by: Kim Soon-ok
- Directed by: Joo Dong-min (Season 1); Oh Joon-hyuk (Season 1–2); Oh Song-hee (Season 2)
- Starring: Um Ki-joon; Hwang Jung-eum; Lee Joon; Lee Yu-bi; Shin Eun-kyung; Yoon Jong-hoon; Jo Yoon-hee; Jo Jae-yoon; Lee Jung-shin
- Music by: Kim Joon-seok; Jeong Se-rin
- Country of origin: South Korea
- Original language: Korean
- No. of seasons: 2
- No. of episodes: 33

Production
- Executive producers: Park Young-soo (CP); Kang Bo-ah
- Producers: Han Jung-hwan; Seo Jang-won; Yoo Ho-sung; Seo Gyun
- Cinematography: Yeo Jung-hoon; Son Hong-rak
- Editors: Jo In-hyung; Park Ji-hyun
- Running time: 60–90 minutes
- Production companies: Chorokbaem Media; Studio S
- Budget: ₩46.2 billion

Original release
- Network: SBS TV
- Release: September 15, 2023 – May 18, 2024

The Escape of the Seven (Korean: 7인의 탈출) is a 2023–2024 South Korean television series starring Um Ki-joon, Hwang Jung-eum, Lee Joon, Lee Yu-bi, Shin Eun-kyung, Yoon Jong-hoon, Jo Yoon-hee, and Jo Jae-yoon. It revolves around seven main characters. The first season aired on SBS TV from September 15 to November 17, 2023, every Friday and Saturday at 22:00 (KST). The second season aired on SBS TV from March 29, to May 18, 2024, every Friday and Saturday at 22:00 (KST). It is also available for streaming on Coupang Play and Wavve in South Korea, and on Viu, Viki and Kocowa in selected regions.

== Series overview ==
Season	Episodes	Originally released			Time slot (KST)	Avg. viewership (millions)
Season	Episodes	First released	Last released	Network	Time slot (KST)	Avg. viewership (millions)
1	17	September 15, 2023	November 17, 2023	SBS TV	Fridays and Saturdays at 22:00 (KST)	1.133
2	16	March 29, 2024	May 18, 2024	SBS TV	Fridays and Saturdays at 22:00 (KST)	N/A

== Synopsis ==
Seven people involved in the case of a missing girl face huge events intertwined with many lies and desires. The journey of searching for the truth leads to bloody revenge resembling divine punishment.

== Cast and characters ==
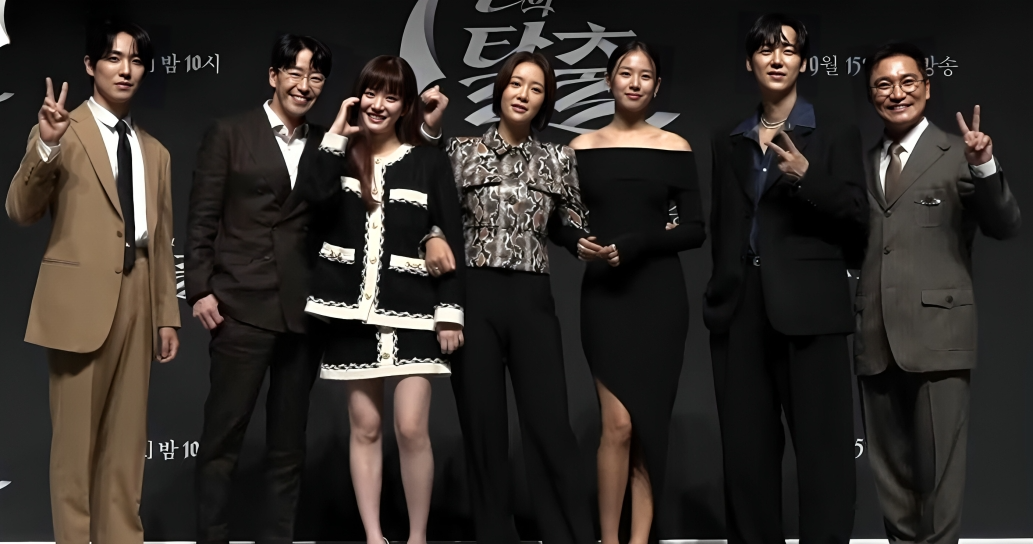
The Escape of the Seven main cast at the press conference on October 6, 2023

=== Main ===
- Um Ki-joon as Matthew Lee / Sim Jun-seok / K
  - Kim Do-hoon as Sim Jun-seok / K

A mysterious figure who was the mastermind of the events happening in the drama, and the real killer of Da-mi. His real identity was Sim Jun-seok, apparent heir of Sungchan Group. He was revealed to be the adoptive son of Sungchan Group's chairman, and he had also hated Do-hyuk for being the biological heir, leading to him attempting to kill Do-hyuk. After having plastic surgery, he returns as Matthew Lee, a Korean-American man who runs the biggest mobile platform company in South Korea but is the tyrannical villainous figure behind the veil. He pretends to be Lee Hwi-so to gain trust of Do-hyuk and Ki-tak and uses Da-mi's revenge as an act after finding out about Chairman Bang and Ki-tak's plan. His true intention is to kill Do-hyuk after making his life miserable.

- Hwang Jung-eum as Geum La-hui (or Geum Ra-hee)

The CEO of a drama production company and Da-mi's biological mother. She is skillful and aggressive at her job. Geum Ra-hee values money and success the most in her life and she will take any path to achieve that. To receive a huge inheritance, she tries to find her daughter whom she abandoned 15 years ago.

- Lee Joon as Min Do-hyuk

A man who used to be a gangster. He does not have a dream or hope for his life. If he trusts someone once, he will trust them for good. Due to this, his life is filled with a series of betrayals. He believes his younger brother and mother died due to Da-mi's adoptive mother, but later found out that it was Jin-mo who killed them, and it led to him secretly acting as a spy for Matthew Lee in order to exact revenge on Jin-mo. He was revealed to be the long-lost biological son of the chairman of Sungchan Group.

- Lee Yu-bi as Han Mo-ne

A young woman wants to become an idol and she is admired by her friends. She seems to have a perfect life but she has a weakness. Her weakness is that she consistently turns out lies. She secretly had a relationship with Jun-seok and gave birth to a daughter, whom she cruelly abandoned. She later frames Da-mi of having the child and ruins her life to protect herself. She also lies about her family having a business is Silicon Valley when in fact her family is poor. Mo-ne will do anything to achieve what she wants even if she has to lie or sacrifice someone to achieve it.

- Shin Eun-kyung as Cha Ju-ran

An OB-GYN and Chil-sung's former lover. She lives with Chil-sung and loves the money he has. Later on she tries to kill him with La-hui when he finds out that she made a fake doctor's report stating that Da-mi is pregnant and ruining her life. She later works as the nurse of Sungchan Group's chairman after being blackmailed by Matthew.

- Yoon Jong-hoon as Yang Jin-mo

The CEO of Cherry Entertainment. He is usually gentle, but once his anger explodes nobody stops him. He is extremely greedy and will do anything for profit. Yang used to work directly for K and knew his identity. He tried to send Do-hyuk to jail and killed his family due to K's orders. One of Mo-ne's most trusted allies, he also knew her and K's relationship. While obeying K's order of destroying Do-hyuk, he grows suspicious of the reasons behind K's hate for him. The only person Jin-mo cares about throughout the series is Ms. Noh.

- Jo Yoon-hee as Go Myung-ji

An art teacher at school. She creates a lie to protect something precious to her and she spreads a weird rumor at school to hide her weakness.

- Jo Jae-yoon as Nam Cheol-woo

The chief detective of Deokseon Police Station who is promoted to Commissioner on later parts of the series. He frames Da-mi's adoptive father for murder and drug dealing as well as for being a drug addict. Ironically, Nam is a drug addict himself. He works for Jun-seok. Later in the series, he decides to help Matthew and work against Jun-seok to save himself.

- Lee Jung-shin as Hwang Chan-sung (Season 2)

=== Supporting ===
- Lee Deok-hwa as Bang Chil-sung

Da-mi's paternal grandfather who is a very wealthy man-building owner. He loves Da-mi very much and genuinely cares for her.

- Yoon Tae-young as Kang Ki-tak

CEO of Taebaek Entertainment who is kept in check by Jin-mo. He was also the former boss of the Central Party, a gangster group centered in Seoul. He was also the former boyfriend of Ra-hee and still have feelings for her. He allied with Matthew Lee to exact revenge on the seven villains. In the later part of the second season, he was revealed to be the real biological father of Da-mi and probably the son of Chil-sung.

- Jung Ra-el as Bang Da-mi
  - Oh Yun-sung as young Bang Da-mi

A school star, Chil-sung's granddaughter and La-hui's biological daughter. She is actually the descendant of a wealthy tycoon, the only grandchild of Chairman Chil-sung, but due to heart disease, her mother abandoned her for 15 years. When her biological mother brought her back home, she became a tool to inherit her grandfather's property in her mother's plan.

- Min Young-ki as Lee Hwi-so

Da-mi's adoptive father who was framed for murdering her and sentenced to death. He was kidnapped by K who assumed his identity to trick Do-hyuk and Ki-tak.

- Seo Young-hee as Park Nan-young

Da-mi's adoptive mother. She was murdered by Jin-mo, who framed her for killing Do-hyuk's family.

- Kim Ki-doo as Joo Yong-ju

Jin-mo's subordinate. He was responsible for spreading fake news to frame Da-mi and her adoptive father for having a sexual relationship in order to hide Mo-ne's secret.

- Ahn Eun-ho as Hong Man-du

Jin-mo's subordinate.

- Jung Da-eun as Song Ji-ah

A bully at Myeongju Girls' High School. After reaching adulthood, she grew remorseful for bullying Da-mi, and also fell out with Mo-ne, who often ordered her to do the bullying and even stole Ji-ah's written songs as her own. She was revealed to have taken the blame of murdering her abusive father in self-defence to protect her elder sister from prosecution, and Mo-ne made use of this secret to force Ji-ah to do her bidding. She was later murdered by Jun-seok.

- Eom Ji-yoon as Yoo-jin

A bully at Myeongju Girls' High School.

- Jang Ha-kyung as So-yeon

A bully at Myeongju Girls' High School.

- Im Seong-kyun as Min Jae-hyuk

Do-hyuk's foster younger brother.

- Lee Jong-nam as Jung Mi-so

Do-hyuk's foster mother, who adopted Do-hyuk during his birth.

- Han Da-hee as Oh Hye-bin

Ra-hee's head secretary.

- Han Bo-reum as Noh Paeng-hee

A bar owner who was Jin-mo's partner. She adopted a daughter named Han-na, who is the biological daughter of Mo-ne.

- Kim Hyun as Yoon Ji-sook

Mo-ne's deaf-mute mother.

- Eun Hae-sung as Han Kyung-soo

Mo-ne's eldest brother with a confident personality and strong assertiveness.

- Lee Eugene as Han Cheong-soo

Mo-ne's younger brother.

- Ji Seung-hyun as Uhm Ji-man

A Deputy Chief Prosecutor who fabricated the evidence of the killings to seek a death sentence for Hwi-so on the grounds of murdering Da-mi and Chil-sung. He was murdered by Jun-seok after he found out the secret of Jun-seok's parentage.

- Lee Jung-hyun as Baek Ik-ho

A baker in the detention center. He was Ki-tak's loyal henchman while in and outside of prison.

- Lee Boo-young as Executive Director Hwang

A silent assistant and personal secretary of Chil-sung.

- Yuju as Song Ji-sun / Michelle

=== Extended ===
- Lim Bo-ra as Jo Su-ji

An actress from Cherry Entertainment who betrayed her former company Taebaek Entertainment.

- Shin Soo-yeon as Han-na

=== Special appearances ===
- Tae Hang-ho as the chairman's son of Myeongju Girls' High School
- Han Da-ra as Hong Sa-ra
- Danny Ahn
- Kim So-yeon

== Production ==
=== Development ===
The work brings together author Kim Soon-ok with director Jo Dong-min for the third time after the series The Last Empress (2018) and The Penthouse: War in Life (2020–21). The series was produced by SBS Drama Division, Studio S, in cooperation with Chorokbaem Media. The cost of production the series was about ₩46.2 billion (US$40.39 million) for both seasons 1 and 2.

On February 24, 2023, it was revealed that the series was preparing for a second season. On October 13, 2023, it was announced that main director Jo Dong-min was leaving, and the second season would be directed by Oh Joon-hyuk, who also co-directed the first season. On December 29, 2023, it was announced that director Oh Song-hee would co-direct the second season with Oh Joon-hyuk.

=== Filming ===
On September 22, 2022, the cast was confirmed with the start of filming for the series. Filming for the first season ended on July 6, 2023. Filming for the second season began in July 2023.

On December 5, 2022, the production company apologized for illegally parking a small car on the sidewalk and paid a fine to the Parking Management Division of the Administrative Support Bureau of the District Office.

== Viewership ==
The Escape of the Seven : South Korea viewers per episode (thousands)

Season	Episode number																	Average
Season	1	2	3	4	5	6	7	8	9	10	11	12	13	14	15	16	17	Average
1	972	1183	1138	1310	1163	1374	1193	1145	1080	1120	975	1056	1337	1044	990	1025	1154	1133
2	831	617	732	534	548	N/A	618	N/A	593	N/A	702	626	551	522	666	827	–	N/A

Source: Audience measurement performed nationwide by Nielsen Korea.

Average TV viewership ratings (season 1)
Ep.	Original broadcast date	Average audience share		
Ep.	Original broadcast date	Nielsen Korea		TNmS
Ep.	Original broadcast date	Nationwide	Seoul	Nationwide
1	September 15, 2023	6.0% (6th)	5.4% (7th)	5.1% (9th)
2	September 16, 2023	6.1% (4th)	6.3% (2nd)	5.9% (8th)
3	September 22, 2023	6.7% (4th)	6.5% (4th)	5.6% (10th)
4	September 23, 2023	7.7% (2nd)	7.3% (2nd)	7.0% (2nd)
5	September 29, 2023	5.6% (3rd)	5.5% (3rd)	N/A
6	September 30, 2023	7.3% (2nd)	7.0% (2nd)	6.4% (2nd)
7	October 13, 2023	6.8% (7th)	7.1% (4th)	6.2% (7th)
8	October 14, 2023	6.5% (4th)	6.5% (3rd)	6.7% (3rd)
9	October 20, 2023	6.0% (7th)	6.7% (6th)	5.4% (13th)
10	October 21, 2023	5.7% (5th)	5.9% (4th)	N/A
11	October 27, 2023	5.3% (9th)	5.3% (7th)	4.8% (11th)
12	October 28, 2023	5.6% (5th)	5.8% (4th)	N/A
13	November 3, 2023	7.2% (4th)	7.4% (3rd)	5.9% (9th)
14	November 4, 2023	5.6% (5th)	5.7% (5th)	N/A
15	November 10, 2023	5.2% (10th)	5.5% (9th)	4.7% (13th)
16	November 11, 2023	5.2% (6th)	5.3% (5th)	N/A
17	November 17, 2023	6.6% (7th)	7.3% (5th)	N/A
Average		6.2%	6.3%	— (Note: Due to multiple unpublished ratings, the exact average rating is unknown.)
In the table above, the blue numbers represent the lowest ratings and the red numbers represent the highest ratings.; N/A denotes ratings that were not published.

Average TV viewership ratings (season 2)
Ep.	Original broadcast date	Average audience share (Nielsen Korea)	
Ep.	Original broadcast date	Nationwide	Seoul
1	March 29, 2024	4.4% (12th)	5.0% (9th)
2	March 30, 2024	3.2% (19th)	3.7% (9th)
3	April 5, 2024	3.8% (14th)	4.5% (12th)
4	April 6, 2024	2.7% (21st)	3.2% (15th)
5	April 12, 2024	3.1% (17th)	3.4% (14th)
6	April 13, 2024	2.4% (26th)	2.9% (18th)
7	April 19, 2024	3.3% (16th)	3.7% (14th)
8	April 20, 2024	2.3% (26th)	2.6% (19th)
9	April 26, 2024	3.8% (13th)	4.4% (10th)
10	April 27, 2024	2.1% (27th)	2.5% (18th)
11	May 3, 2024	3.5% (14th)	3.9% (12th)
12	May 4, 2024	3.0% (16th)	3.6% (9th)
13	May 10, 2024	3.3% (16th)	3.2% (13th)
14	May 11, 2024	3.1% (21st)	3.3% (15th)
15	May 17, 2024	3.2% (16th)	3.5% (13th)
16	May 18, 2024	4.1% (10th)	4.5% (6th)
Average		3.2%	3.9%
In the table above, the blue numbers represent the lowest ratings and the red numbers represent the highest ratings.

== Awards and nominations ==
Name of the award ceremony, year presented, category, nominee of the award, and the result of the nomination
Award ceremony	Year	Category	Nominee / Work	Result	Ref.
SBS Drama Awards	2023	Excellence Award, Actor in a Miniseries Genre/Action Drama	Lee Joon	Won	
SBS Drama Awards	2023	Excellence Award, Actress in a Miniseries Genre/Action Drama	Lee Yu-bi	Won	
SBS Drama Awards	2023	Best New Actor	Kim Do-hoon	Won	
SBS Drama Awards	2023	Top Excellence Award, Actor in a Miniseries Genre/Action Drama	Um Ki-joon	Nominated	
SBS Drama Awards	2023	Top Excellence Award, Actress in a Miniseries Genre/Action Drama	Hwang Jung-eum	Nominated	
SBS Drama Awards	2023	Best Supporting Performance in a Miniseries Genre/Action Drama	Yoon Tae-young	Nominated	
SBS Drama Awards	2023	Excellence Award, Actress in a Miniseries Genre/Action Drama	Jo Yoon-hee	Nominated	
