= Queendom Puzzle =

South Korean reality survival show

- Hangul: 퀸덤 퍼즐
- RR: Kwindeom peojeul
- MR: K'windŏm p'ŏjŭl
- Genre: Reality competition
- Based on: Queendom
- Presented by: Taeyeon
- Country of origin: South Korea
- Original language: Korean
- No. of seasons: 1

Production
- Running time: 120 minutes
- Production companies: CJ ENM; W Team; Apple Monster

Original release
- Network: Mnet; TVING
- Release: June 13 – August 15, 2023

Related
- Queendom (2019); Road to Kingdom (2020); Kingdom: Legendary War (2021); Road to Kingdom: Ace of Ace (2024)

Queendom Puzzle (Korean: 퀸덤 퍼즐) is a 2023 South Korean reality competition show created by Mnet. It premiered on Mnet on June 13, 2023, airing every Tuesday at 22:00 KST. The show concluded on August 15, 2023.

The show serves as a spin-off series of Queendom, however it does not share a similar format with the previous seasons, only taking the name of the series.

== Concept and format ==
On January 26, 2023, it was announced that the Queendom series would have a third season, but would be different from the previous two seasons.

The show will focus on forming a global project girl group by taking members from currently active girl groups as well as solo female artists and piecing them together like a puzzle. It will take on a completely new format from the pre-existing Queendom series, with individual competitions taking place rather than team competition.

Out of the initial 28 contestants, they will compete through performances to finally become a 7-member supergroup, El7z Up.

== Promotion and broadcast ==
On April 10, 2023, Mnet released the first teaser video on their YouTube channel. In the teaser, iconic girl group songs play in the background as well as the silhouettes of seven female celebrities are shown. Along with the confirmation that the first lineup will be revealed in May, the teaser includes the mysterious code on the bottom, "IURP WZHQWB HLJKW WR VHYHQ", which deciphers "from twenty-eight to seven".

On April 24, Mnet confirmed that Girls' Generation's Taeyeon will host the show. The first six contestants were also revealed, as well as Weeekly, and H1-KEY where its agency, GLG, confirmed two of their members' participation in the show.

On April 25, it was revealed that WJSN's Yeoreum would be a contestant in the show. On April 26, it was revealed that members Jiwon, Chaerin and Bora from Cherry Bullet would participate in the show. On April 27, it was revealed that Yuki from Purple Kiss would also be a contestant.

On May 2, the remaining member of AOA, Chanmi, now known as Dohwa, was revealed as a contestant in the show.

On May 9, Mnet released a second teaser to officially announce the program's premiere date of June 13, 2023, at 22:00 (KST). In the teaser, silhouettes of the cast members are revealed as well as Taeyeon standing in the center.

On May 18, Mnet released teaser photos of the first 13 contestants in silhouettes, as well as two teams created, Pick on the top and Pick-Cat. The two teams also released two theme songs titled "Charismatic" and "Snap" respectively on the same day, accompanied by two performance videos shown on M Countdown. It was also shared that the rest of the contestants would be revealed the week after, and that they would be releasing and performing the same two songs on M Countdown in their own versions. On the same day, Lee Chae-yeon and Haein were reported to have withdrawn from the show. They would not be replaced and the show would continue with 26 contestants. On May 19, Mnet released individual teaser videos and posters previewing the first 13 contestants revealed.

On May 25, Mnet released a second set of teaser photos of the remaining 13 contestants in silhouettes, as well as the two teams, Drop The Beat & Athena. The two teams also released different versions of the two theme songs on the same day, accompanied by performance videos shown on M Countdown. On May 26, Mnet released individual teaser videos and posters for the remaining 13 contestants.

On May 29, Mnet released a group poster containing all contestants and MC Taeyeon, as well as the profiles of the 26 contestants. On June 2, Mnet released the first teaser trailer.

On June 6, a behind-the-scenes video was released, showing the contestants meeting each other for the first time. An exclusive preview, also known as Episode 0, was also released, showing the first hour of Episode 1 that was to be aired in the following week.

On June 8, a special stage of the contestants was aired on M Countdown.

== Cast ==
=== Host ===
- Taeyeon

== Contestants ==
All of the contestants have previous experiences in the K-pop industry, either as a current or former member of a girl group or as a soloist. The lineup of contestants includes members of Cherry Bullet, Rocket Punch, Weki Meki, H1-Key, AOA, WJSN, Purple Kiss, Weeekly, Woo!ah!, Lightsum, TripleS, and former members of Lovelyz, CLC, Momoland, BNK48, and NMB48. The show originally had 28 contestants, though Chaeyeon and Haein of Laboum both left the show prior to its airing for personal reasons. Both made appearances in the first 2 episodes.

Color key

Final members of El7z Up
Contestants eliminated in the final episode
Contestants eliminated in the second elimination round
Contestants eliminated in the first elimination round
Contestants that left the show

List of Queendom Puzzle contestants
28 contestants
Hwiseo (휘서) (Note: Hwiseo and Riina are members of H1-Key.)	Nana (나나) (Note: Nana and Wooyeon are members of Woo!ah!.)	Yuki (ゆき) (Note: Yuki is a member of Purple Kiss.)	Kei (케이) (Note: Kei is a member of Lovelyz.)	Yeoreum (여름) (Note: Yeoreum is a member of WJSN.)	Yeonhee (연희) (Note: Juri, Suyun, and Yeonhee are members of Rocket Punch.)	Yeeun (예은) (Note: Yeeun, currently a solo artist, is a former member of CLC.)
Suyun (수윤) (Note: Juri, Miru, Riina, Suyun, and Chaeyeon are former Produce 48 contestants.) (Note: Bora, Dohwa, Elly, Haein, Juri, and Suyun participated in Girls Reverse.)	Wooyeon (우연)	Jihan (지한) (Note: Jihan, Soeun, Soojin, and Zoa are members of Weeekly.)	Elly (엘리) (Note: Elly is a member of Weki Meki.) (Note: Elly is a former Produce 101 contestant.)	Juri (朱里) (Note: Juri is a former member of AKB48)	Jiwoo (지우) (Note: Jiwoo and Seoyeon are members of TripleS.) (Note: Jiwoo is a former My Teenage Girl contestant.)	Dohwa (도화) (Note: Dohwa is a member of AOA.)
Jiwon (지원) (Note: Bora, Chaerin, and Jiwon are members of Cherry Bullet.) (Note: Bora and Jiwon participated in Girls Planet 999.)	Fye (ฝ้าย) (Note: Fye is a former member of BNK48.)	Miru (美瑠) (Note: Miru Shiroma is a former member of NMB48.)	Riina (리이나)	Zoa (조아)	Bora (보라)	Soojin (수진) (Note: Soojin and Soeun are former Mix Nine contestants.)
Sangah (상아) (Note: Sangah is a member of Lightsum.)	Soeun (소은)	Seoyeon (서연)	JooE (주이) (Note: JooE is a former member of Momoland.)	Chaerin (채린)	Haein (해인) (Note: Haein is a member of Laboum.) (Note: Haein is a former The Unit: Idol Rebooting Project contestant.) (Note: Lee Chae-yeon and Haein dropped out of the show prior to its premiere date. They have participated in the first recording session and will not be edited out of the broadcast.)	Chaeyeon (채연) (Note: Chaeyeon, currently a soloist, is a former member of Iz*One) (Note: Chaeyeon is a former Sixteen contestant.) (Note: Chaeyeon is a former Street Woman Fighter contestant.)

=== Contestant Progress ===
Group	Contestant	Round 1 (Note: Up-Down Battle shown on Episodes 1 and 2.)				Round 2 (Note: Shown on Episodes 2 and 3.)		Round 3 (Note: Re-Mix Battle shown on Episodes 3 and 4.)	Round 4 (Note: All-Rounder Battle shown on Episodes 5 and 6.)	Ranking					Semi-Final (Note: Shown on Episode 9.)	Ranking						Final Ranking
Group	Contestant	Tier		Votes		7:7 Battle	Top 7 (Note: Only the Top 7 contestants were revealed, without revealing the number of votes.)	Round 3	Round 4	Episode 7				Episode 8 (Note: Only the tiers were revealed, without revealing the number of votes. Tier 1 stands for Top 7 contestants, Tier 2 stands for contestants that would advance to the Finals (together with the Top 7), and Tier 3 stands for contestants on brink of elimination. These tiers were based on votes up to July 31, 23:59 (KST).)	Semi-Final	Episode 9				Episode 10		Final Ranking
Group	Contestant	Before (Note: Tiering based on 50% on number of Music Show wins and 50% on number of first week album sales.)	After (Note: Through re-evaluation done by the fellow contestants.)	Up	Down	7:7 Battle	Top 7	Round 3	Round 4	#	Voting Points	Benefits	Total Points (Note: After adding up the benefit votes won through winning the 7:7, Re-Mix, and All-Rounder Battles.)	Tier	Semi-Final	#	Voting Points	Benefits	Total Points (Note: After adding up the benefit votes won through winning the Semi-Final Battle.)	#	Total Points	Final Ranking
Soloist	Kei (케이)	1	2	▲18	▼9	Win	Yes	4	Win	4	345,529	30,000	375,529	1	Lose	6	485,485	—N/a	485,485	4	376,553	4
Soloist	Yeeun (예은)	2	1	▲19	▼8	Lose	Yes	3	Win	5	344,959	20,000	364,959	1	Win	5	464,677	30,000	494,677	7	350,517	7
Soloist	Dohwa (도화)	1	3	▲11	▼16	Win	No	1	Lose	17	166,012	30,000	196,012	2	Win	10	313,755	30,000	343,755	14	229,076	14
Soloist	Fye (파이/ฝ้าย)	4	2	▲16	▼11	Win	No	6	Lose	20	144,391	10,000	154,391	3	Win	16	260,370	30,000	290,370	Eliminated		16
Soloist	Miru (미루/美瑠)	4	4	▲5	▼22	Win	No	3	Lose	18	184,176	10,000	194,176	3	Lose	17	285,533	—N/a	285,533	Eliminated		17
Soloist	JooE (주이)	1	4	▲6	▼21	Lose	No	2	Lose	25	70,439	—N/a	70,439	Eliminated								25
Soloist	Chaeyeon (채연)	1	1	▲20	▼7	Left the show																
Cherry Bullet (체리블렛)	Jiwon (지원)	3	1	▲24	▼3	Win	Yes	5	Win	9	255,263	30,000	285,263	3	Lose	15	296,033	—N/a	296,033	Eliminated		15
Cherry Bullet (체리블렛)	Bora (보라)	3	1	▲25	▼2	Lose	Yes	5	Win	8	272,657	20,000	292,657	3	Lose	20	249,489	—N/a	249,489	Eliminated		20
Cherry Bullet (체리블렛)	Chaerin (채린)	3	4	▲4	▼23	Lose	No	5	Lose	26	49,336	—N/a	49,336	Eliminated								26
H1-Key (하이키)	Hwiseo (휘서)	4	1	▲23	▼4	MVP	No	6	Lose	3	381,051	10,000	391,051	1	Win	1	564,400	30,000	594,400	1	444,495	1
H1-Key (하이키)	Riina (리이나)	4	3	▲8	▼19	Lose	No	6	Win	15	191,859	20,000	211,859	3	Lose	18	275,835	—N/a	275,835	Eliminated		18
Laboum (라붐)	Haein (해인)	2	4	▲5	▼22	Left the show																
Lightsum (라잇썸)	Sangah (상아)	4	3	▲11	▼16	Lose	No	6	Win	22	103,258	20,000	123,258	Eliminated								22
Purple Kiss (퍼플키스)	Yuki (유키/小雪)	2	2	▲13	▼14	Lose	No	2	Win	7	286,283	20,000	306,283	1	Win	3	492,245	30,000	522,245	3	394,649	3
Rocket Punch (로켓펀치)	Yeonhee (연희)	3	3	▲12	▼15	Lose	No	5	Lose	11	275,565	—N/a	275,565	1	Lose	7	461,327	—N/a	461,327	6	358,059	6
Rocket Punch (로켓펀치)	Suyun (수윤)	3	3	▲12	▼15	Lose	No	1	Win	12	215,973	40,000	255,973	2	Lose	12	312,667	—N/a	312,667	8	302,579	8
Rocket Punch (로켓펀치)	Juri (쥬리/朱里)	3	3	▲7	▼20	Win	No	2	Lose	10	267,258	10,000	277,258	2	Lose	9	376,298	—N/a	376,298	12	282,362	12
TripleS (트리플에스)	Jiwoo (지우)	3	3	▲7	▼20	Win	No	2	Lose	16	197,166	10,000	207,166	2	Lose	14	306,475	—N/a	306,475	13	274,403	13
TripleS (트리플에스)	Seoyeon (서연)	3	4	▲2	▼25	Lose	No	5	Lose	24	88,862	—N/a	88,862	Eliminated								24
Weeekly (위클리)	Jihan (지한)	2	2	▲17	▼10	Win	Yes	1	Win	6	298,611	50,000	348,611	2	Lose	11	339,485	—N/a	339,485	10	293,904	10
Weeekly (위클리)	Zoa (조아)	2	2	▲16	▼11	Lose	No	3	Win	14	212,717	20,000	232,717	3	Lose	19	273,641	—N/a	273,641	Eliminated		19
Weeekly (위클리)	Soojin (수진)	2	2	▲13	▼14	Lose	No	2	Lose	21	124,269	—N/a	124,269	3	Lose	21	229,811	—N/a	229,811	Eliminated		21
Weeekly (위클리)	Soeun (소은)	2	2	▲13	▼14	Win	No	4	Lose	23	96,186	10,000	106,186	Eliminated								23
Weki Meki (위키미키)	Elly (엘리)	4	4	▲4	▼23	Win	No	2	Lose	19	171,822	10,000	181,822	2	Win	8	347,416	30,000	377,416	11	292,486	11
WJSN (우주소녀)	Yeoreum (여름)	1	1	▲24	▼3	Lose	Yes	3	Win	2	382,964	20,000	402,964	1	Win	4	475,236	30,000	505,236	5	371,096	5
woo!ah! (우아!)	Nana (나나)	4	1	▲19	▼8	MVP	Yes	1	Win	1	480,960	50,000	530,960	1	Lose	2	537,782	—N/a	537,782	2	430,450	2
woo!ah! (우아!)	Wooyeon (우연)	4	4	▲4	▼23	Win	No	3	Win	13	208,692	30,000	238,692	2	Lose	13	307,745	—N/a	307,745	9	300,106	9

== Voting ==
The final group will be decided based on votes through the Mnet Plus and Twinkple applications, where each voter choose 7 contestants to vote as an ideal final group.

First Voting Period

- The voting period for every week began from the start of the episode, to 2 hours before the airing of the following episode. The entire voting period started from June 13, 2023, during the broadcast of Episode 1, and had concluded on July 25, 2023, 23:00 (KST).
- One new vote (from each application) would be provided at the start of each episode, for 7 weeks. Hence, each voter would have a maximum of 14 votes throughout the voting period.
- All votes cast to each contestant would be accumulated throughout the voting period and will be reflected in the eventual ranking after this voting period. The voting results would be based on 50% for Korea and 50% for all other global regions.

Second Voting Period

- The votes in the first voting period would not be carried over to the second voting period.
- The voting period would begin from after Episode 7, to during the broadcast of the Episode 9.
- Voters can vote once every day. However, on August 8, which is the live broadcast for Episode 9, voters can vote twice on this day: once before 20:00 (KST), and once during the broadcast of the episode.
- All votes cast to each contestant would be accumulated throughout the voting period and will be reflected in the eventual ranking after this voting period. The voting results would be based on 50% for Korea and 50% for all other global regions.

Final Voting Period

- The votes in the second voting period would not be carried over to the final voting period.
- The voting period would begin from after Episode 9, to during the broadcast of the Episode 10.
- Voters can vote once every day. However, on August 15, which is the live broadcast for Episode 10, voters can vote twice on this day: once before 20:00 (KST), and once during the broadcast of the episode.
- All votes cast to each contestant would be accumulated throughout the voting period and will be reflected in the eventual ranking after this voting period. The voting results would be based on 50% for Korea and 50% for all other global regions.

== Episodes ==
=== Round 1: Up-Down Battle (Episode 1-2) ===
The 28 contestants are split into four tiers, based on the following criteria (as at April 24, 2023):

- Number of times the contestant has won first places in music shows (50%)
- Largest number of first week orders among all physical albums released (50%) (based on data from Circle Chart)

The two scores are added up and each contestant would be placed in Tiers 1 to 4.

Tier	Contestants
1	Dohwa, JooE, Kei, Lee Chae-yeon, Yeoreum
2	Haein, Jihan, Soojin, Soeun, Yeeun, Yuki, Zoa
3	Bora, Chaerin, Jiwon, Juri, Jiwoo, Suyun, Yeonhee, Seoyeon
4	Elly, Fye, Hwiseo, Miru, Nana, Riina, Sangah, Wooyeon

Each contestant would then have a solo performance, and the remaining 27 contestants would each vote for the contestant. "Up" would be pressed if the voters each think that the performing contestant has performed better than the voter, and if otherwise "Down" would be pressed. After the performances, the contestants would be rearranged into their new tiers based on the results of the performances.

Ep #	#	Contestant	Song(s)	Votes		Former Tier	New Tier	
Ep #	#	Contestant	Song(s)	Up	Down	Former Tier	New Tier	
Ep 1	1	Dohwa	"Elvis" by AOA "Bingle Bangle" (빙글뱅글) by AOA "Come See Me" (날 보러 와요) by AOA	▲11	▼16	1	3	(2▼)
Ep 1	2	Zoa	"After School" by Weeekly "Rum Pum Pum Pum" (첫 사랑니) by f(x)	▲16	▼11	2	2	Same position
Ep 1	3	Jiwoo	"Rising" by TripleS	▲7	▼20	3	3	Same position
Ep 1	4	Jiwon	"Gotta Go" (벌써 12시) by Chungha	▲24	▼3	3	1	(2▲)
Ep 1	5	Suyun	"Advice" by Taemin	▲12	▼15	3	3	Same position
Ep 1	6	Nana	"Move" by Taemin	▲19	▼8	4	1	(3▲)
Ep 1	7	Chaeyeon	"Toc Toc Toc" (톡!톡!톡!) by Lee Hyori	▲20	▼7	1	1	Same position
Ep 1	8	Fye	"Hype Boy" by NewJeans "Gone Gurl" by Fyeqoodgurl	▲16	▼11	4	2	(2▲)
Ep 1	9	Riina	"Rose Blossom" (건물 사이에 피어난 장미) by H1-Key "Pop!" by Nayeon	▲8	▼19	4	3	(1▲)
Ep 1	10	Jihan	"Pop!" by Nayeon	▲17	▼10	2	2	Same position
Ep 1	11	Wooyeon	"INVU" by Taeyeon	▲4	▼23	4	4	Same position
Ep 1	12	Yeoreum	"As You Wish" (이루리) by WJSN "Mmmh" (음) by Kai	▲24	▼3	1	1	Same position
Ep 1	13	Bora	"My Sea" (아이와 나의 바다) by IU	▲25	▼2	3	1	(2▲)
Ep 2	14	Juri	"Heart Burn" (열이올라요) by Sunmi	▲7	▼20	3	3	Same position
Ep 2	15	Yeonhee	"Dumb Dumb" (덤덤) by Jeon Somi	▲12	▼15	3	3	Same position
Ep 2	16	Soeun	"28 Reasons" by Seulgi	▲13	▼14	2	2	Same position
Ep 2	17	Soojin	"Flower" (꽃) by Jisoo	▲13	▼14	2	2	Same position
Ep 2	18	Seoyeon	"Cherry Talk" by TripleS +(KR)ystal Eyes	▲2	▼25	3	4	(1▼)
Ep 2	19	Miru	"Shine Bright" by Miru	▲5	▼22	4	4	Same position
Ep 2	20	Yuki	"WH0 CARES? (Queen's Prelude)" by Yuki (Purple Kiss)	▲13	▼14	2	2	Same position
Ep 2	21	Sangah	"Black Dress" by CLC "Tomboy" by (G)I-dle	▲11	▼16	4	3	(1▲)
Ep 2	22	Yeeun	"Cherry Coke" by Yeeun	▲19	▼8	2	1	(1▲)
Ep 2	23	Haein	"Journey to Atlantis" (상상더하기) by Laboum "Between Us" (체온) by Laboum	▲5	▼22	2	4	(2▼)
Ep 2	24	Elly	"Sonata of Temptation" (유혹의 소나타) by Ivy	▲4	▼23	4	4	Same position
Ep 2	25	Chaerin	"Bicycle" by Chungha	▲4	▼23	3	4	(1▼)
Ep 2	26	JooE	"24 Hours" (24시간이 모자라) by Sunmi	▲6	▼21	1	4	(3▼)
Ep 2	27	Hwiseo	"Rose Blossom" (건물 사이에 피어난 장미) by H1-Key "Tomboy" by (G)I-dle	▲23	▼4	4	1	(3▲)
Ep 2	28	Kei	"Destiny" (나의 지구) by Lovelyz	▲18	▼9	1	2	(1▼)

After Performances

Tier	Contestants
1	Bora, Yeoreum, Jiwon, Hwiseo, Chaeyeon, Nana, Yeeun
2	Kei, Jihan, Zoa, Fye, Soeun, Soojin, Yuki
3	Suyun, Yeonhee, Sangah, Dohwa, Riina, Juri, Jiwoo
4	JooE, Miru, Haein, Elly, Wooyeon, Chaerin, Seoyeon

=== Round 2: 7:7 Team Battle (Episode 2-3) ===
For this round, each contestant would choose one of the 2 signal songs, "Charismatic" and "Snap", in order of the number of Ups received from the Up-Down Battle, and there would be 14 contestants per song. In the event when there are already 14 contestants in one of the songs, the remaining contestants that have not chosen would be automatically allocated to the other song. Each song would consist of 2 teams: "PICK" and "DROP". After the contestants choose, in the Puzzle Room, Jiwon would form the 2 teams for "Charismatic", while Bora would form the 2 teams for "Snap". The formed teams would practice and then record performance videos for the songs.

- A panel of 13 expert judges will watch the performance videos and evaluate them. The panel of judges consist of the following:
  - Seo Eun-kwang (BtoB)
  - Lee Min-hyuk (BtoB)
  - Hyolyn
  - La Chica: Gabee, Rian, Simeez (Dance Group)
  - Choi Young-jun (Choreographer)
  - Ryan S. Jhun (Music Producer)
  - Kim Do-yeon (Film Director)
  - Lee Gi-seok (Music Video Director)
  - Park Hee-a (Journalist)
  - Kim Yoon-ha (Music Critic)
  - RyuD (Choreographer)
- In addition, the 14 contestants of "SNAP" would evaluate both teams of "Charismatic" and vice versa.
- For each song, the team with more votes wins. The contestants under the winning team of each song would get a benefit of 10,000 points.
- There would be 1 MVP for the winning team of each song, based on the selection of the expert panel. The selected MVPs would have the right to arrange the teams for the next round.

Song	Teams & Contestants							Result	Votes	MVP
Charismatic	PICK (PICK on the top)							WIN	21	Nana
Charismatic	Jiwon	Nana	Chaeyeon (Note: Left the program in the middle of the round.)	Jiwoo	Soeun	Wooyeon	Jihan	WIN	21	Nana
Charismatic	DROP (DROP The Beat)							LOSE	6	Nana
Charismatic	Suyun	Haein	Seoyeon	JooE	Soojin	Zoa	Yeonhee	LOSE	6	Nana
SNAP	PICK (PICK-CAT)							LOSE	0	Hwiseo
SNAP	Yeeun	Yeoreum	Sangah	Yuki	Bora	Riina	Chaerin	LOSE	0	Hwiseo
SNAP	DROP (Athena (아테나))							WIN	27	Hwiseo
SNAP	Elly	Miru	Dohwa	Kei	Hwiseo	Fye	Juri	WIN	27	Hwiseo

=== Round 3: Re-mix Battle (Episode 3-4) ===
The contestants would form new teams and recreate top K-pop songs by various K-pop acts.

- The MVPs of the previous round, Nana and Hwiseo, have the right to form all 6 teams, with both of them having the right to choose the song they want to re-create first. After that, the contestants of the winning teams would be distributed, then followed by the contestants of the losing teams. After the puzzling, only members from the winning teams of the previous round ("PICK on the top" & "Athena") can raise objections on the song they are assigned to. Then, the 2 MVPs (Nana and Hwiseo) can decide whether to make the change or not.
- After each performance, 300 on-site audience would evaluate it, and the score would be revealed immediately after voting ended. From the second performance onwards, the current first place team's score and the current performing team's score would be revealed simultaneously, (Note: The voting results of each team are shown to the members but hidden from the audience.) to show whether the current performing team has replaced the previous first place team or not.
- Each member of the winning team will get a benefit of 20,000 points.

#	Team	Contestants	Song	Original Singer	Total Votes	Final Ranking
1	Shh Yes I'm a queen (쉿 Yes I'm a queen)	Nana, Jihan, Dohwa, Suyun	"Nxde"	(G)I-dle	222	1st
2	Biceps (이두근)	Elly, Jiwoo, Juri, JooE, Soojin, Yuki	"Fighting" (파이팅 해야지)	BSS	209	2nd
3	RED QUEEN	Hwiseo, Fye, Sangah, Riina	"Shut Down"	Blackpink	152	6th
4	Soulmate (소울메이트)	Soeun, Kei	"Only One"	BoA	184	4th
5	Beauty Fox (미예여우조)	Miru, Wooyeon, Yeoreum, Yeeun, Zoa	"Don't Call Me"	Shinee	201	3rd
6	Under the C	Jiwon, Bora, Chaerin, Seoyeon, Yeonhee	"Dance The Night Away"	Twice	166	5th

=== Round 4: All-Rounder Battle (Episode 4-6) ===
The contestants would be split into Team Queendom and Team Puzzle immediately after the Remix Battle performances, starting from contestant Yeonhee being picked into Team Queendom and contestant Kei being picked into Team Puzzle, with the rest of the contestants choosing Team Queendom or Team Puzzle afterwards. As part of winning the Remix Battle, contestants Jihan, Dohwa, Nana and Suyun can bring contestant(s) from one team to another. Lastly, if one team does not have 13 contestants, through voting among the team with more than 13 contestants, contestant(s) would move to the team without 13 contestants.

- For this battle, each team would perform 3 rounds of vocal-rap songs, and 2 rounds of dance songs.
- For the vocal-rap songs, 3-4 songs would be shown, and each team will pick one song on a first come, first serve basis.
- For the dance songs, they would be newly produced songs, and the selection of the songs would be through a dance battle between the two teams; the winning team would get to pick 2 of the 4 songs available first, while the remaining 2 songs not picked would automatically be allocated to the other team.
- For each round, the audience would vote for the better performance of the 2. (Note: Fellow group members and family members of the contestants would also attend the recording of the battle as audience, but they are not allowed to vote for the entire battle.) The team that has the higher total score after the 5 rounds would take the battle, and the members of the winning team would each get a benefit of 20,000 votes. The winning team would only be revealed in Episode 7, which would be a special live broadcast.

Teams

Team	Contestants
Queendom	Yeonhee, Jiwoo, Seoyeon, Juri, Dohwa, Hwiseo, Soeun, Elly, Miru, Chaerin, JooE, Fye, Soojin
Puzzle	Kei, Nana, Bora, Wooyeon, Zoa, Jihan, Jiwon, Yeeun, Suyun, Yeoreum, Riina, Sangah, Yuki

Category	Round	Team			
Category	Round	PUZZLE Team		QUEENDOM Team	
Category	Round	Members & Song	Votes	Votes	Members & Song
VOCAL & RAP	R1	Yeeun, Yeoreum, Suyun, Nana, Zoa, Yuki "Rush Hour" by Crush (feat. J-Hope)	253	133	JooE, Yeonhee, Soojin, Seoyeon "Weekend" by Taeyeon
VOCAL & RAP	R2	Kei, Bora "If We Ever Meet Again" (다시 만날 수 있을까) by Lim Young-woong	208	178	Dohwa, Fye, Juri, Jiwoo "Hopeless Romantic" (사랑이라 믿었던 것들은) by Big Naughty (feat. Lee Su-hyun)
VOCAL & RAP	R3	Jiwon, Wooyeon, Jihan, Sangah, Riina "Wannabe" by ITZY	217	169	Miru, Elly, Chaerin, Soeun, Hwiseo "Time of Our Life" (한 페이지가 될 수 있게) by Day6
DANCE	R4	Kei, Yeeun, Suyun, Nana, Wooyeon, Sangah "BAD BLOOD"	245	155	Miru, Dohwa, Fye, Soojin, Seoyeon, Jiwoo "Overwater"
DANCE	R5	Yeoreum, Bora, Jiwon, Jihan, Zoa, Yuki, Riina "WEB" (선)	223	177	JooE, Elly, Chaerin, Juri, Yeonhee, Soeun, Hwiseo "Glow-Up"

Final Score

Team	Rounds					Total Score	Won Rounds	Results
Team	Round 1	Round 2	Round 3	Round 4	Round 5	Total Score	Won Rounds	Results
PUZZLE	253	208	217	245	223	1,146	5	Win
QUEENDOM	133	178	169	155	177	812	0	Lose

=== Round 5: Semi-Final (Episode 7-9) ===
Five (5) contestants will be eliminated during the first live broadcast, wherein the votes starting from the start of the show until the airing of the episode will be tallied. The benefit points earned from the previous rounds will also be combined, and the Top 7 members will be announced. Subsequently, the Bottom 5 who will be eliminated are also announced.

Episode 7: Scores & Ranking
Rank	Contestant	Votes	Benefits	Total Points
1st	Nana	480,960	50,000	530,960
2nd	Yeoreum	382,964	20,000	402,964
3rd	Hwiseo	381,051	10,000	391,051
4th	Kei	345,529	30,000	375,529
5th	Yeeun	344,959	20,000	364,959
6th	Jihan	298,611	50,000	348,611
7th	Yuki	286,283	20,000	306,283
8th	Bora	272,657	20,000	292,657
9th	Jiwon	255,263	30,000	285,263
10th	Juri	267,258	10,000	277,258
11th	Yeonhee	275,565	0	275,565
12th	Suyun	215,973	40,000	255,973
13th	Wooyeon	208,692	30,000	238,692
14th	Zoa	212,717	20,000	232,717
15th	Riina	191,859	20,000	211,859
16th	Jiwoo	197,166	10,000	207,166
17th	Dohwa	166,012	30,000	196,012
18th	Miru	184,176	10,000	194,176
19th	Elly	171,822	10,000	181,822
20th	Fye	144,391	10,000	154,391
21st	Soojin	124,269	0	124,269
22nd	Sangah	103,258	20,000	123,258
23rd	Soeun	96,186	10,000	106,186
24th	Seoyeon	88,862	0	88,862
25th	JooE	70,439	0	70,439
26th	Chaerin	49,336	0	49,336

The following contestants from the three songs are eliminated before the performances:

Song	Eliminated Contestant(s)
Puzzlin'	Chaerin, JooE
i DGA (I Don't Give A)	Sangah, Soeun
I Do	Seoyeon

The Semi-Final voting assembly-choice voting began from July 4 to 7, 23:59 (KST), via the Mnet Plus application, where voters listen to snippets of three newly produced songs and for each song, they pick 7 contestants they want to put in. The three teams would then be formed based on the votes. Subsequently, elimination of 5 contestants would be conducted on Episode 7 (special live broadcast), followed by member adjustments to the teams, such that each song would only have 7 contestants. The eventual performances of the three songs would be held in the Semi-Final, which is Episode 9 (live broadcast).

Through live text votes in Episode 9, the winning team is decided. The members of the winning team would each get a benefit of 30,000 votes. Subsequently, 7 contestants would be eliminated.

#	Contestants	Song	Vote Percentage	Result
1	Kei, Miru, Jiwon, Riina, Soojin, Wooyeon, Suyun	"Puzzlin'" (Prod. Young K)	35.3%	Lose
2	Yuki, Hwiseo, Yeeun, Dohwa, Fye, Yeoreum, Elly (Note: Originally in the "I Do" Team, Elly chose to join the "i DGA (I Don't Give A)" Team.)	"i DGA (I Don't Give A)" (Prod. Bobby)	36.3%	Win
3	Bora, Yeonhee, Zoa, Jiwoo, Nana, Jihan, Juri	"I Do" (Prod. Ryan S. Jhun)	28.4%	Lose

Episode 9 (Semi-Final): Scores & Ranking
Rank	Contestant	Song	Votes	Benefits	Total Points
1st	Hwiseo	i DGA (I Don't Give A)	564,400	30,000	594,400
2nd	Nana	I Do	537,782	0	537,782
3rd	Yuki	i DGA (I Don't Give A)	492,245	30,000	522,245
4th	Yeoreum	i DGA (I Don't Give A)	475,236	30,000	505,236
5th	Yeeun	i DGA (I Don't Give A)	464,677	30,000	494,677
6th	Kei	Puzzlin'	485,485	0	485,485
7th	Yeonhee	I Do	461,327	0	461,327
8th	Elly	i DGA (I Don't Give A)	347,416	30,000	377,416
9th	Juri	I Do	376,298	0	376,298
10th	Dohwa	i DGA (I Don't Give A)	313,755	30,000	343,755
11th	Jihan	I Do	339,485	0	339,485
12th	Suyun	Puzzlin'	312,667	0	312,667
13th	Wooyeon	Puzzlin'	307,745	0	307,745
14th	Jiwoo	I Do	306,745	0	306,745
15th	Jiwon	Puzzlin'	296,033	0	296,033
16th	Fye	i DGA (I Don't Give A)	260,370	30,000	290,370
17th	Miru	Puzzlin'	285,533	0	285,533
18th	Riina	Puzzlin'	275,835	0	275,835
19th	Zoa	I Do	273,641	0	273,641
20th	Bora	I Do	249,489	0	249,489
21st	Soojin	Puzzlin'	229,811	0	229,811

=== Round 6: Final (Episode 9-10) ===
The 21 contestants would choose one of the two newly produced songs. After the elimination of 7 contestants that happened in Episode 9 (Semi-Final Round & Second Live Episode), the remaining 14 contestants would be split into 2 teams, through the grouping by the top 2 as at Semi-Final, Hwiseo and Nana.

The following contestants from the two songs are eliminated before the performances:

Song	Eliminated Contestant(s)
Billionaire	Jiwon
Last Piece	Fye, Riina, Miru, Soojin, Zoa, Bora

#	Members	Song
1	Nana, Yeonhee, Wooyeon, Jihan, Suyun, (Note: Suyun, Yuki, and Kei originally chose "Last Piece", but then moved to "Billionaire" during the second grouping after the Semi-Final.) Yuki, Kei	"Billionaire" (Prod. Kenzie, LDN Noise)
2	Hwiseo, Yeoreum, Yeeun, Dohwa, Elly, Jiwoo, Juri	"Last Piece" (Prod. Kenzie, Moonshine)

Rank	Contestant	Song	Votes
1st	Hwiseo	Last Piece	444,495
2nd	Nana	Billionaire	430,450
3rd	Yuki	Billionaire	394,649
4th	Kei	Billionaire	376,553
5th	Yeoreum	Last Piece	371,096
6th	Yeonhee	Billionaire	358,059
7th	Yeeun	Last Piece	350,517
8th	Suyun	Billionaire	302,579
9th	Wooyeon	Billionaire	300,106
10th	Jihan	Billionaire	293,904
11th	Elly	Last Piece	292,486
12th	Juri	Last Piece	282,362
13th	Jiwoo	Last Piece	274,403
14th	Dohwa	Last Piece	229,076

== Discography ==
=== Queendom Puzzle Team Battle 1 ===
Released on May 18, 2023
No.	Title	Lyrics	Music	Artist	Length
1.	"Charismatic"	SKINNER BOX; Michelle Cho (Singing Beetle)	Ylva Dimberg; Philip Knudsen; HIDDEN SOUND (HSND); SakaZan; Foundboy; Michelle Cho (Singing Beetle)	PICK on the top (Note: Members include Jihan, Jiwon, Jiwoo, Nana, Soeun and Wooyeon.)	3:07
2.	"SNAP"	Kim Eana	Ryan S. Jhun; Dino Medanhodzic; Cazzi Opeia; Ellen Berg; (Note: Arranged by Ryan S. Jhun and Dino Medanhodzic)	PICK-CAT (Note: Members include Bora, Chaerin, Riina, Sangah, Yeeun, Yeoreum and Yuki.)	3:42

=== Queendom Puzzle Team Battle 2 ===
Released on May 25, 2023
No.	Title	Lyrics	Music	Artist	Length
1.	"Charismatic"	SKINNER BOX; Michelle Cho (Singing Beetle)	Ylva Dimberg; Philip Knudsen; HIDDEN SOUND (HSND); SakaZan; Foundboy; Michelle Cho (Singing Beetle)	DROP The Beat (Note: Members include JooE, Seoyeon, Soojin, Suyun, Yeonhee and Zoa.)	3:07
2.	"SNAP"	Kim Eana	Ryan S. Jhun; Dino Medanhodzic; Cazzi Opeia; Ellen Berg	Athena (Note: Members include Dohwa, Elly, Fye, Hwiseo, Juri, Kei and Miru.)	3:42

=== Queendom Puzzle Rise Up ===
Released on June 8, 2023
No.	Title	Lyrics	Music	Artist	Length
1.	"Rise Up"	Lee Seu-ran	Nmore; Shannon; (Note: Arranged by Nmore)	Queendom Puzzle	3:19
2.	"Rise Up (Inst.)"		Nmore; Shannon		3:19

=== Queendom Puzzle All-Rounder Battle 1 ===
Released on July 12, 2023
No.	Title	Lyrics	Music	Artist	Length
1.	"Wannabe"	Galactika	Galactika; Woobin; (Note: Arranged by Kim Seung-joon)	Riina, Sangah, Wooyeon, Jiwon, Jihan	4:11
2.	"Hopeless Romantic" (사랑이라 믿었던 것들은)	Big Naughty	dress; Big Naughty; (Note: Arranged by Kim Kyung-hwan)	Dohwa, Jiwoo, Juri, Fye	4:27
3.	"Time of Our Life" (한 페이지가 될 수 있게)	Young K	Jae; Sungjin; Young K; Wonpil; Hong Ji-sang; (Note: Arranged by Hong Hoon-gi and Kim Kyung-hwan)	Miru, Soeun, Elly, Chaerin, Hwiseo	3:52

=== Queendom Puzzle All-Rounder Battle 2 ===
Released on July 19, 2023
No.	Title	Lyrics	Music	Artist	Length
1.	"Bad Blood"	SKINNER BOX; Jo Se-yeon; Ryan S. Jhun; Erik Smaaland; Kristoffer Tømmerbakke; Alida Peck	Ryan S. Jhun; Erik Smaaland; Kristoffer Tømmerbakke; Alida Peck; (Note: Arranged by Ryan S. Jhun, Erik Smaaland and Kristoffer Tømmerbakke)	Nana, Sangah, Suyun, Yeeun, Wooyeon, Kei	2:57
2.	"Overwater"	FLUM3N; Boran; IRIS	dress; FLUM3N; Boran; IRIS; Dacy; (Note: Arranged by FLUM3N and Dacy)	Dohwa, Miru, Seoyeon, Soojin, Jiwoo, Fye	3:09
3.	"Web" (선)	GDLO (MonoTree); Jo Se-yeon	NickIE (PAPERMAKER); WWWAVE (PAPERMAKER); Leever (PAPERMAKER); (Note: Arranged by NickIE (PAPERMAKER) and Leever (PAPERMAKER))	Riina, Bora, Yeoreum, Yuki, Zoa, Jiwon, Jihan	3:30
4.	"Glow-Up"	DayOff (MUMW); Kim Lu-ki (MUMW); Y0UNG (MUMW); Kim Ji-young (MUMW); Ryan S. Jhun; Nathan Cunningham; Marc Raymond Ernest Sibley; Sofia Quinn; Benjamin Shaprio	Ryan S. Jhun; Nathan Cunningham; Marc Raymond Ernest Sibley; Sofia Quinn; (Note: Arranged by Ryan S. Jhun and Space Primates)	Soeun, Elly, Yeonhee, JooE, Juri, Chaerin, Hwiseo	3:28

=== Queendom Puzzle Semi Final ===
Released on August 9, 2023
No.	Title	Lyrics	Music	Artist	Length
1.	"Puzzlin'"	Young K	GARDEN; Young K; HotSauce; (Note: Arranged by GARDEN)	Riina, Miru, Suyun, Soojin, Wooyeon, Jiwon, Kei	3:21
2.	"i DGA (I Don't Give A)"	Bobby	Bobby; The Proof; (Note: Arranged by The Proof)	Dohwa, Elly, Yeoreum, Yeeun, Yuki, Fye, Hwiseo	3:19
3.	"I Do"	Jessica Oh; Ryan S. Jhun; Nathan Cunningham; Marc Sibley; Brandon Hamlin; Rosina Hamlin; Rosina Russell; Dan Vidmar	Ryan S. Jhun; Nathan Cunningham; Marc Sibley; Brandon Hamlin; Rosina Hamlin; Rosina Russell; Dan Vidmar; (Note: Arranged by Ryan S. Jhun, Space Primates and Jason OK)	Nana, Bora, Yeonhee, Zoa, Juri, Jiwoo, Jihan	3:10

=== Queendom Puzzle Final ===
Released on August 16, 2023
No.	Title	Lyrics	Music	Artist	Length
1.	"Billionaire"	Kenzie	Kenzie; Hayden Chapman; Greg Bonnick; Courtney Jenaé Stahl; (Note: Arranged by LDN Noise)	Nana, Suyun, Yeonhee, Wooyeon, Yuki, Jihan, Kei	3:09
2.	"Last Piece"	Kenzie	Kenzie; Ludvig Evers; Jonatan Gusmark; Adrian Mckinnon; (Note: Arranged by Kenzie and Moonshine)	Dohwa, Elly, Yeoreum, Yeeun, Juri, Jiwoo, Hwiseo	3:06

=== Chart performance ===
Title	Year	Peak chart positions	Album
Title	Year	KOR Down.	Album
"Charistmatic"	2023	—	Queendom Puzzle Team Battle 1
"SNAP"	2023	—	Queendom Puzzle Team Battle 1
"Charistmatic"	2023	—	Queendom Puzzle Team Battle 2
"SNAP"	2023	—	Queendom Puzzle Team Battle 2
"Rise Up"	2023	—	Queendom Puzzle Rise Up
"Wannabe"	2023	—	Queendom Puzzle All-Rounder Battle 1
"Hopeless Romantic" (사랑이라 믿었던 것들은)	2023	—	Queendom Puzzle All-Rounder Battle 1
"Time of Our Life" (한 페이지가 될 수 있게)	2023	—	Queendom Puzzle All-Rounder Battle 1
"Bad Blood"	2023	124	Queendom Puzzle All-Rounder Battle 2
"Overwater"	2023	—	Queendom Puzzle All-Rounder Battle 2
"Web" (선)	2023	—	Queendom Puzzle All-Rounder Battle 2
"Glow-Up"	2023	—	Queendom Puzzle All-Rounder Battle 2
"Puzzlin'"	2023	123	Queendom Puzzle Semi Final
"i DGA (I Don't Give A)"	2023	—	Queendom Puzzle Semi Final
"I Do"	2023	182	Queendom Puzzle Semi Final
"Billionaire"	2023	161	Queendom Puzzle Final
"Last Piece"	2023	—	Queendom Puzzle Final
"—" denotes releases that did not chart or were not released in that region.

== Ratings ==
Average TV viewership ratings
Ep.	Original broadcast date	Average audience share
Ep.	Original broadcast date	Nielsen Korea (Nationwide)
1	June 13, 2023	0.243%
2	June 20, 2023	0.519%
3	June 27, 2023	0.486%
4	July 4, 2023	0.526%
5	July 11, 2023	0.507%
6	July 18, 2023	0.474%
7	July 25, 2023	0.399%
8	August 1, 2023	N/A
9	August 8, 2023	0.188%
10	August 15, 2023	0.287%
In the table above, the blue numbers represent the lowest ratings and the red numbers represent the highest ratings.; N/A denotes ratings that were not published.; This series aired on a cable channel/pay TV which normally has a relatively smaller audience compared to free-to-air TV/public broadcasters (KBS, SBS, MBC and EBS).
