= Girls Reverse =

South Korean reality competition show

- Promotional poster
- Also known as: Girls Reverse
- Hangul: 소녀 리버스
- RR: Sonyeo ribeoseu
- MR: Sonyŏ ribŏsŭ
- Genre: Reality competition
- Opening theme: "I Promise"
- Country of origin: South Korea
- Original language: Korean
- No. of seasons: 1
- No. of episodes: 12

Production
- Producers: Park Jin-kyung, Cho Wook-hyung
- Production companies: Kakao Entertainment, Parable Entertainment, TAKE2 Media Group

Original release
- Network: KakaoTV
- Release: January 2, 2023

Re:Verse (Korean: 소녀 리버스; RR: Sonyeo ribeoseu; lit. 'Girls Reverse') is a South Korean reality competition show created by Kakao Entertainment. The purpose of the competition show is to make a virtual 5 member girl group. The 30 participants already being members of a debuted girl group and have an opportunity to debut in a group in the virtual world. The show premiered on January 2, 2023, was broadcast through KakaoPage until their final episode on March 6, 2023, which announced the final five members of the group Fe:verse.

== Concept ==
'RE:VERSE' is a survival idol show where 30 members of a real-life K-pop girl group compete for a debut opportunity in the virtual world 'W'. It applies virtual reality and motion capture technology to capture the participants gestures and expressions in real-time and transmits them live through virtual characters to vividly direct their performances. The contestants can't reveal their identity in the real world until they are eliminated from the show.

== Promotion and Broadcast ==
At the beginning of October 2022, various promotional clips and contents were uploaded onto the RE:VERSE official channels.

The theme song, "약속해 (I Promise)" was released on November 26, 2022, and the music video was shown during 2022 Melon Music Awards.

The show was originally scheduled to air on November 28, 2022, but due to circumstances regarding licensing for artwork within the virtual reality, the show was indefinitely postponed and all social media was deleted. On December 26, 2022, it was announced the survival show will officially air on January 2, 2023, after dealing with the circumstances. After the licensing circumstances, the credits of the creation of the artwork was shown at the end of each episode.

The virtual reality is created and filmed through VRChat. The show is premiered on KakaoPage, YouTube, Abema and Kocowa.

From February 6, 2023, Kakao Entertainment announced a webtoon named 'Girls Reverse Behind' featuring the contestants of Girls Reverse through KakaoPage and Kakao Webtoon every Monday.

== Cast ==
=== Judges ===
- Boom
- Bada
- Aiki
- Pengsoo

=== Guest ===
- Apoki
- Lee Min-hyuk

== Contestants ==
There are total of 30 contestants participating in the competition, all from existing Korean girl groups.

The names of contestants are listed as named on official sites, not their real names.

Color key (In order of contestant's group rank on the show)

Final members of Fe:verse
Contestants eliminated in the final episode
Contestants eliminated in the second elimination round
Contestants eliminated in the first elimination round
Contestants that left the show

30 contestants
Muneo (무너)	Seoritae (서리태)	Keuang (크앙)	Rien (리엔)	KimSerena (김세레나)
Rose (로즈)	JipSunHui (집순희)	Ruby (루비)	Zzaru (짜루)	Sera (세라)
Dopamine (도파민)	Barim (바림)	Nikena (니케나)	Cheer (치어)	Nemo (니모)
Catherine (캐서린)	Sundaenaejang (순대내장)	Chonky Cat (뚱냥이) (Note: Left the show due to health reasons)	Watchiswatch (시계는 와치)	Junghorang (정호랑)
Rascal (라스칼)	Yenycall (예니콜)	CacaoPrincess (차차다섯공주)	Hairoo (하이루)	Ujewel (유주얼)
Dohwa (도화)	HwaEuiJa (화의자)	Cherry (체리)	Kiki (키키)	Chadodo (차도도)

== Ranking ==
Color key

New Top 5

#	Ep. 1	January 11	January 30	Ep. 9	February 16	Special Live	Ep. 11	
#	1	JipSunHui	Rien (↑3)	Seoritae (↑15)	Muneo (↑7)	Seoritae (↑2)	Seoritae (-)	Muneo (↑2)
2	Keuang	Ruby (↑22)	Ruby (-)	JipSunHui (↑2)	Muneo (↓1)	Ruby (↑1)	Seoritae (↓2)	
3	Sera	Dopamine (↑20)	Rien (↓2)	Seoritae (↓2)	Ruby (↑1)	Muneo (↓1)	Keuang (↑5)	
4	Rien	Catherine (↑15)	JipSunHui (↑2)	Ruby (↓2)	Rien (↑1)	Rien (-)	Rien (-)	
5	Hwaeuija	Muneo (↑15)	Sera (↑3)	Rien (↓2)	JipSunHui (↓3)	JipSunHui (-)	KimSerena (↑4)	

== Discography ==
=== Singles ===
Title	Year	Peak positions	Album
Title	Year	KOR	Album
"I Promise"	2022	—	Non-album single
운명처럼	2023	—	RE:VERSE Final
시간이 날 태우고 너에게 데려가	2023	—	RE:VERSE Final
"—" denotes releases that did not chart or were not released in that region.

== Awards and nominations ==
Name of the award ceremony, year presented, category, nominee of the award, and the result of the nomination
Award ceremony	Year	Category	Nominee / Work	Result	Ref.
BCWW New Media Content Awards	2023	Best Production Award (Reality Show)	Girls Reverse	TBA	
