= Love Andante =

2024 South Korean television series

- Promotional poster
- Hangul: 사랑의 안단테
- RR: Sarangui andante
- MR: Sarangŭi andant'e
- Genre: Romantic comedy
- Written by: Kim Yuna
- Directed by: Yoon Ryu-hae
- Starring: Kwon Hyun-bin; Song Ji-woo
- Country of origin: South Korea
- Original language: Korean
- No. of episodes: 8

Production
- Production company: Even Ent

Original release
- Network: Lifetime
- Release: August 7 – August 29, 2024

Love Andante (Korean: 사랑의 안단테) is a 2024 South Korean television series starring Kwon Hyun-bin and Song Ji-woo. It aired on Lifetime from August 7–29, 2024, every Wednesday and Thursday at 23:00 (KST). It is also available for streaming on TVING in South Korea, on Kocowa in Americas, Europe, and Oceania, and on KNTV in Japan.

== Cast and characters ==
- Kwon Hyun-bin as Im Joo-hyung

- Song Ji-woo as Ha Na-kyung

- Ki Hyun-woo as Nam Kyung-ho

Na-kyung's bodyguard.

- Kim Bo-ra as Park Dam-so

- Heo Ji-won as Kim Joo-hee

== Production and release ==
=== Development ===
The romantic comedy series was written by Kim Yuna, directed by Yoon Ryu-hae, and produced by Even Ent, the overseas business in charge of A&E Networks.

=== Release ===
Originally, the series is scheduled to be released at the end of December 2023, but it was postponed.

On July 14, A&E Korea announced that the series would be simultaneously released in 88 countries around the world. It will be exclusively released in Korea on the Lifetime channel on August 7, 2024, at 23:00 (KST) and will be released on TVING the following day. It will also be exclusively serviced overseas in North America, Central and South America, Europe, and Oceania through Wave America, and in Japan through KNTV.
