= Oh Ye-ju =

South Korean actress and model (born 2004)

- Born: October 5, 2004 (age 22); Seoul, South Korea
- Education: Dongduk Women's University
- Occupations: Actress; model
- Years active: 2019–present
- Agent: Rain Company
- Height: 169 cm (5 ft 6 1/2 in)

Korean name
- Hangul: 오예주
- RR: O Yeju
- MR: O Yeju

Oh Ye-ju (Korean: 오예주; born October 5, 2004), is a South Korean actress and model who has quickly become a rising star in the Korean entertainment industry. She is signed to Rain Company, the agency founded by the famous singer and actor Rain. Oh Ye-ju first gained significant attention for her breakout role as Yoon Cheong-ha in the historical drama Under the Queen's Umbrella (2022), where she charmed viewers with her character's spirited personality and romantic storyline.

== Early life and education ==
Born in Seongnam, Gyeonggi Province, she pursued her education at Dongduk Women's University. Interestingly, she was scouted in front of her school, despite not having initial dreams of becoming an actress.

== Filmography ==
=== Films ===
Year	Title	Role	Notes	Ref.
2021	Aporia		Independent film	
2024	Troll Factory	Lee Eun-chae		

=== Television series ===
Year	Title	Role	Notes	Ref.
2021	Hometown Cha-Cha-Cha	teenage Yoon Hye-jin		
2022	From Now On, Showtime!	young Go Seul-hae		
2022	Under the Queen's Umbrella	Yoon Cheong-ha		
2023	The Matchmakers	Jo Ye-jin		
2024	No Gain No Love	young Son Hae-yeong		
2024	Gangnam B-Side	Kang Ye-seo		
2024	Love Your Enemy	young Yoon Ji-won		
2024	Drama Special: To My Lonely Sister	Yoo Ha-neul	One-act drama	
2026	In Your Radiant Season	Song Ha-dam		
2026	Phantom Lawyer	Kim Su-ah	Special appearances (Ep. 3–4)	

== Awards and nominations ==
Name of the award ceremony, year presented, category, nominee of the award, and the result of the nomination
Award ceremony	Year	Category	Nominee / Work	Result	Ref.
KBS Drama Awards	2024	Best Actress in Drama Special/TV Cinema	To My Lonely Sister	Won	
