= Love Adventure =

Extended play by Cherry Bullet

Single album by Cherry Bullet
- Released: May 22, 2019
- Recorded: 2019
- Language: Korean
- Label: FNC

Cherry Bullet chronology
Let's Play Cherry Bullet (2019)	Love Adventure (2019)	Cherry Rush (2021)

Singles from Love Adventure
- 1. "Really Really" Released: May 22, 2019

Music video
- "Really Really" on YouTube

Love Adventure is the second single album by the South Korean girl group Cherry Bullet. It was released digitally and physically on May 22, 2019, by FNC Entertainment. It contains three tracks, including the lead single "Really Really". This was the final release with members Mirae, Kokoro and Linlin, before they left the group on December 13, 2019.

== Background and release ==
On May 9, it was revealed that Cherry Bullet would release their second single, Love Adventure with title track "Really Really", on May 22.

Concept images of each of the members were released from May 13 to May 17.

A music video teaser was released on May 18 and the full music video on May 22 together with the single release.

== Promotion ==
Cherry Bullet held a live showcase at the YES24 Live Hall in Gwangjin-gu, Seoul, on May 22, where they performed "Really Really" along with "Ping Pong". Cherry Bullet collaborated with LG U+ to establish an augmented reality / virtual reality experience zone and actively introduced it. LG U+ set up an AR / VR experience zone on the scene.

The group started promoting the title track "Really Really" on May 23. They first performed the lead single on Mnet's M Countdown, followed by performances on KBS' Music Bank, MBC's Show! Music Core and SBS' Inkigayo.

== Track listing ==
No.	Title	Lyrics	Music	Arrangement	Length
1.	"Really Really" (네가 참 좋아)	Han Seong-ho, Kim Do Hun	Erik Lidbom	Erik Lidbom	3:15
2.	"Ping Pong" (탁구공)	VIP, Shin Ji-min	Daniel Keonu Park, Malin Johansson	Daniel Keonu Park	3:43
3.	"Ruddy" (발그레)	Seo Youngbae, Shin Ji-min	Seo Youngbae, Ylva Dimberg	Seo Youngbae	3:12
Total length:					10:10

== Charts ==
Chart (2019)	Peak position
South Korean Albums (Gaon)	9

== Release history ==
Region	Date	Format	Distributor
Various	May 22, 2019	Digital download; streaming	FNC Entertainment; Kakao M
South Korea	May 22, 2019	Digital download; streaming	FNC Entertainment; Kakao M
South Korea	May 22, 2019	CD	FNC Entertainment; Kakao M
