= Cherry Rush =

- Digital cover

EP by Cherry Bullet
- Released: January 20, 2021
- Genres: K-pop; bubblegum pop; dance-pop; synth-pop
- Length: 17:24
- Language: Korean
- Labels: FNC; Kakao M

Cherry Bullet chronology
Love Adventure (2019)	Cherry Rush (2021)	Cherry Wish (2022)

Singles from Cherry Rush
- 1. "Hands Up" Released: February 11, 2020; 2. "Aloha Oe" Released: August 6, 2020; 3. "Love So Sweet" Released: January 20, 2021

Cherry Rush is the debut extended play by South Korean girl group Cherry Bullet. It was released on January 20, 2021, by FNC and distributed by Kakao M. The EP contains five tracks (seven tracks on CD), including the lead single "Love So Sweet".

== Background and release ==
On January 8, 2020, FNC Entertainment announced that Cherry Bullet would make a comeback with their first EP Cherry Rush on January 20. They also revealed "Love So Sweet" as the lead single. On January 10, they released the group concept photos for Cherry Rush. On January 11, the first set of the individual concept photos for Cherry Rush was released. On January 12, the second set of the individual concept photos for Cherry Rush was released. On January 14, they released the first music video teaser for "Love So Sweet". On January 16, the tracklist and the highlight medley for the EP was released. On January 18, they released the second music video teaser for "Love So Sweet".

On January 20, they released Cherry Rush along with the music video for "Love So Sweet".

== Promotion ==
Earlier, on January 16, FNC stated that Yuju would not be participating in any group activities until January 22 because she was still in quarantine after a confirmed case of COVID-19 at the filming site where she was filming a web drama. Hence, Cherry Bullet had a six-member press showcase on January 20, 2021.

Cherry Bullet had their first weekly music chart shows performance for "Love So Sweet" at Mnet's M Countdown. Then, they continue to promote the single at KBS2's Music Bank, MBC's Show! Music Core, SBS's Inkigayo.

== Track listing ==
Credits adapted from Melon.

Cherry Rush
No.	Title	Lyrics	Music	Arrangement	Length
1.	"Love So Sweet"	Seo Yong-bae (RBW); Mingki (RBW)	Seo Yong-bae (RBW); Mingki (RBW)	Seo Yong-bae (RBW); Mingki (RBW)	3:08
2.	"Follow Me" (라팜파; rapampa)	Han Seong-ho	Alexander Karlsson; Alexej Viktorovitch; Louise Frick Sveen	Alexander Karlsson; Alexej Viktorovitch	3:42
3.	"Keep Your Head Up" (폼 나게; pom nage [lit. "In style"])	Han Seong-ho	Alexander Karlsson; Alexej Viktorovitch; Anne Judith Stokke Wik; Cazzi Opeia	Alexander Karlsson; Alexej Viktorovitch	3:08
4.	"Whatever" (멋대로 해; meottaero hae [lit. "Do as you want"])	Han Seong-ho; Hwiyoung (SF9)	Command Freaks; Louise Frick Sveen	Command Freaks	3:39
5.	"Ting-a-ring-a-ring" (종소리; jongsori [lit. "Sound of bells"])	Jo Yoon-kyung	David Amber; Devyn Rush	David Amber	3:47
Total length:					17:24

Cherry Rush – CD only (bonus tracks)
No.	Title	Lyrics	Music	Arrangement	Length
6.	"Hands Up" (무릎을 탁 치고; mureupeul tak chigo [lit. "Slap your knees"])	Han Seong-ho; Kim Do-hun (RBW); Lee Sang-ho; Jimin	Kim Do-hun (RBW); Lee Sang-ho	Lee Sang-ho; Mingki (RBW)	3:32
7.	"Aloha Oe" (알로하오에; allohaoe)	Seo Yong-bae (RBW); Mingki (RBW)	Seo Yong-bae (RBW); Mingki (RBW)	Seo Yong-bae (RBW); Mingki (RBW)	3:01
Total length:					23:57

== Accolades ==
Year-end lists
Publisher	List	Work	Rank	Ref.
Time	The Best K-Pop Songs and Albums of 2021	"Love So Sweet"	—N/a	

== Charts ==
Weekly sales chart performance for Cherry Rush
Chart (2021)	Peak position
South Korean Albums (Gaon)	11

Monthly sales chart performance for Cherry Rush
Chart (2021)	Peak position
South Korean Albums (Gaon)	44

== Release history ==
Region	Date	Format	Label
South Korea	January 20, 2021	CD; digital download; streaming	FNC, Kakao M
Various	January 20, 2021	Digital download; streaming	FNC, Kakao M
