= Hands Up (Cherry Bullet song) =

2020 single by Cherry Bullet

- Digital edition cover

Single by Cherry Bullet

from the album Cherry Rush
- Released: February 11, 2020
- Recorded: 2019–2020
- Genre: Trap; dance
- Length: 3:32
- Label: FNC
- Songwriters: Han Sung-ho; Kim Do-hoon; Lee Sang-ho; Jimin
- Producers: Kim Do-hoon; Lee Sang-ho; Mingki

Cherry Bullet singles chronology
"Really Really" (2019)	"Hands Up" (2020)	"Aloha Oe" (2020)

Music video
- "Hands Up" on YouTube

"Hands Up" (Korean: 무릎을 탁 치고) is a song recorded by South Korean girl group Cherry Bullet. The song was digitally released on February 11, 2020 by FNC Entertainment. This marks the first release without members Mirae, Kokoro and Linlin, following their departure from the group on December 13, 2019 and their third release overall.

== Background and release ==
On January 28 it was revealed that Cherry Bullet will make a comeback with their first digital single Hands Up on February 11, marking their first comeback since Mirae, Kokoro and Linlin's departure in December 2019. Concept images featuring each of the members were released from February 4 to February 5.

The music video teaser was released on February 10 and the full music video on February 11 together with the single release.

== Composition ==
An energetic trap and dance track, "Hands Up" samples the melody of "Für Elise" by Beethoven, which runs throughout the song. Labelmate Jimin, former leader of AOA, took part in writing the song.

== Promotion ==
Cherry Bullet held a live showcase at the YES24 Live Hall in Gwangjin-gu, Seoul on February 11, where they performed "Hands Up".

The group started promoting "Hands up" on February 13. They first performed the lead single on Mnet's M Countdown, followed by performances on KBS' Music Bank, MBC's Show! Music Core and SBS' Inkigayo.

== Commercial performance ==
"Hands Up" debuted at number 11 on Billboard's World Digital Songs chart, becoming the group's second entry as well as their highest peak. The song also debuted at number 99 on the K-pop Hot 100, marking the group's first appearance on the chart.

== Track listing ==
Digital download
No.	Title	Lyrics	Music	Arrangement	Length
1.	"Hands Up" (무릎을 탁 치고)	Han Sung-ho, Kim Do-hoon, Lee Sang-ho, Jimin	Kim Do-hoon, Lee Sang-ho	Lee Sang-ho, Mingki	3:32

== Release history ==
Region	Date	Format	Distributor
Various	February 11, 2020	Digital download; streaming	FNC Entertainment; Kakao M
South Korea	February 11, 2020	Digital download; streaming	FNC Entertainment; Kakao M
