= Bora (singer) =

South Korean singer and actress (born 1999)

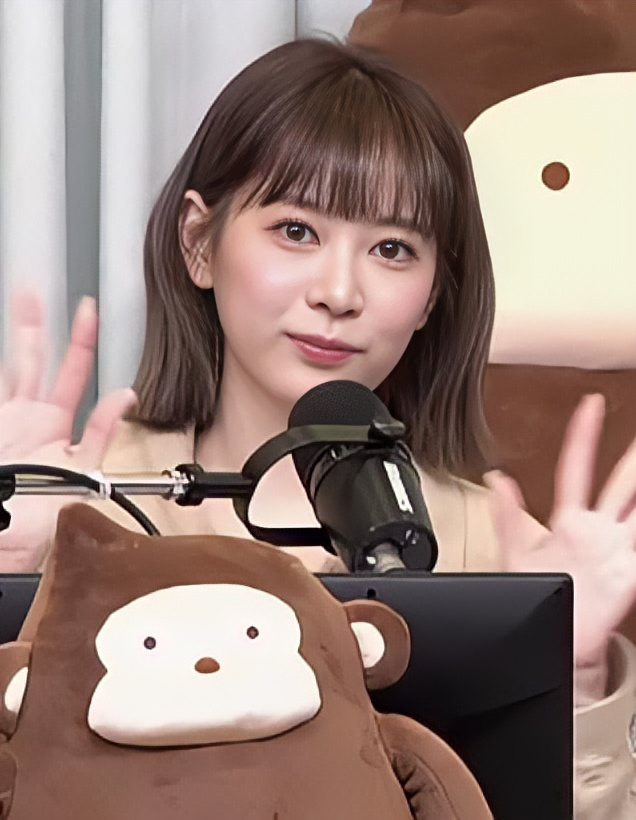
- Bora in March 2023
- Born: Kim Bo-ra; March 3, 1999 (age 27); Gwangju, South Korea
- Occupations: Singer; actress
- Years active: 2019–present
- Musical career
- Genre: K-pop
- Instrument: Vocals
- Labels: FNC; FNC W
- Formerly of: Cherry Bullet

Korean name
- Hangul: 김보라
- RR: Gim Bora
- MR: Kim Pora

Kim Bo-ra (Korean: 김보라; born March 3, 1999), known mononymously as Bora, is a South Korean singer and actress. She is a former member of the South Korean girl group Cherry Bullet. She is best known for her participation in Mnet's reality survival show Girls Planet 999.

== Career ==
Prior to her debut, she appeared in BTS's "Love Yourself: Her" highlight reel as V's partner. She also made a brief appearance in the 2017 drama Girls' Generation 1979.

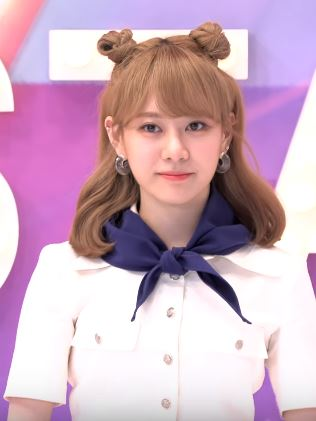
Bora in June 2019

Kim officially made her debut as a member of FNC Entertainment's new girl group Cherry Bullet on January 21, 2019 with the release of their first single album Let's Play Cherry Bullet. In the same year, she participated in the show V-1, however she was eliminated in the first round after losing against Sonamoo's High.D.

In July 2021, she was announced as a contestant on Mnet's reality survival show Girls Planet 999. She was eliminated in the final episode ranking 15th. In the same year she appeared in the web drama Jinx.

In October 2022, she joined the virtual survival show Girls Reverse as Jipsunhui. However, she was eliminated in the final episode ranking 7th.

In 2023, she participated on Mnet's reality show Queendom Puzzle which aims to create a project girl group. On August 8, she was eliminated in episode 9 and ranked 20 in the show with 249,489 points.

== Discography ==
=== Soundtrack appearances ===
List of soundtrack appearances, showing year released and album name
Title	Year	Album
"Want It" (with Kisum)	2020	Almost Famous OST Part 1
"VLV (Viva La Vida)"	2022	Tomorrow OST Part 6
"Paradise"	2023	My Lovely Boxer OST Part 2
"I Wonder If Love Will Come Again"	2023	The Matchmakers OST Part 4
"The Stars We Floated Together"	2024	Branding in Seongsu-dong OST Part 5
"Tears are falling"	2024	Love Andante OST

=== Songwriting credits ===
All song credits are adapted from the Korea Music Copyright Association's database unless stated otherwise.

List of songs, showing year released, artist name, and name of the album
Year	Title	Artist	Album	Composer	Lyricist
2022	"Where You At? (4:00 AM)"	Cherry Bullet	Listen-Up Ep. 3	No	Yes
2023	"Fly Away"	Jipsunhui	Non-album single	Yes	Yes
2023	"A Winter Star"	Cherry Bullet	Cherry Dash	No	Yes

== Filmography ==
=== Television series ===
Year	Title	Role	Notes	Ref.
2017	Girls' Generation 1979		Cameo	

=== Web series ===
Year	Title	Role	Ref.
2020	Almost Famous	Eun-ha	
2021	Jinx	Ja-yeong	
2024	Love Andante	Park Dam-so	
2025	How To Marry Rich by Mistake	Chloe Anderson	

=== Television shows ===
Year	Title	Role	Notes	Ref.
2019	V-1	Contestant		
2021	Girls Planet 999	Contestant	Finished 15th	
2023	Girls Reverse	Contestant	Finished 7th	
2023	Queendom Puzzle	Contestant	Finished 20th	

=== Music video appearances ===
Year	Song title	Artist	Notes	Ref.
2017	"Someone to Love"	Honeyst		
2017	"Love Yourself"	BTS	Appeared as V's partner in highlight reel	
