= In Your Radiant Season =

2026 South Korean television series

- Promotional poster
- Hangul: 찬란한 너의 계절에
- RR: Challanhan neoui gyejeore
- MR: Ch'allanhan nŏŭi kyejŏre
- Genre: Romance drama
- Written by: Jo Sung-hee
- Directed by: Jeong Sang-hee; Kim Young-jae
- Starring: Lee Sung-kyung; Chae Jong-hyeop
- Music by: Moon Sung-nam
- Opening theme: "In Season" by Kim Ka-yeon
- Country of origin: South Korea
- Original language: Korean
- No. of episodes: 12

Production
- Executive producers: Park Sang-hyun; Kim Hee-yeol; Hong Soo-hwan (CP)
- Producers: Lee Wol-yeon; Moon Joo-hee; Ahn Jae-hong
- Running time: 64–71 minutes
- Production company: Pan Entertainment

Original release
- Network: MBC TV
- Release: February 20 – April 3, 2026

In Your Radiant Season (Korean: 찬란한 너의 계절에) is a 2026 South Korean television series written by Jo Sung-hee, directed by Jeong Sang-hee and Kim Young-jae, and starring Lee Sung-kyung and Chae Jong-hyeop. The series tells the story of Sunwoo Chan, who lives life to the fullest, and Song Ha-ran, who is stuck in her emotions, and how their connection brings warmth and change to both their lives when they meet. It aired on MBC TV from February 20 to April 3, 2026 every Friday and Saturday at 21:50 (KST). It is also available for streaming on Disney+.

== Synopsis ==
In Boston, Sunwoo Chan found solace in messaging with Song Ha-ran, his roommate Kang Hyuk-chan's girlfriend. Their laptops had been swapped, and Sunwoo Chan had been talking to her anonymously. He formed a secret bond with her, even sending her a pen as a gift, all without revealing his true identity. An explosion in Boston claimed Kang Hyuk-chan's life and left Sunwoo Chan with serious injuries and partial memory loss. He later reunited with Song Ha-ran in Korea, collaborating with her fashion brand Nana Atelier. Traumatized by her parents' fatal accident and Kang Hyuk-chan's death, Song Ha-ran cut ties with strangers. Sunwoo Chan's warmth slowly opened her up, but his sudden departure sparked curiosity. Nana Atelier's CEO, Kim Na-na, Song Ha-ran's grandmother, is struggling with dementia symptoms and contemplating retirement. Meanwhile, Song Ha-ran's sister, Song Ha-young, develops feelings for Yeon Tae-seok, a longtime employee of Kim Na-na. Their romance is complicated because Tae-seok was likely responsible for her parents' car accident. Song Ha-dam, the youngest, is crushing on high school baseball star Cha Yu-gyeom. He is the only one who knows about her grandmother's dementia.

== Cast ==
=== Main ===
- Lee Sung-kyung as Song Ha-ran
  - Go Hae-won as young Haran

The eldest sister of the three sisters. She's the head designer at Nana Atelier, Korea's top fashion house, hiding behind a perfect image. She's trapped in grief, still hurting from past losses. Then she meets Sunwoo Chan, and her carefully controlled world starts to fall apart.

- Chae Jong-hyeop as Sunwoo Chan
  - Jung Min-joon as young Chan

A character designer at a top animation studio. Behind his sunny personality, he harbors deep scars from a mysterious accident in the past that caused him to lose his hearing and memory. But when he meets Ha-ran, he's forced to face a shocking secret.

=== Supporting ===
==== Ha-ran's family ====
- Lee Mi-sook as Kim Na-na

She is the maternal grandmother of the three Song sisters, and the head of Nana Atelier, South Korea's top high-end fashion house. She is a first-generation designer who is a perfectionist with a cold, sharp professional image, earning her the nickname "the Anna Wintour of Korea".

- Han Ji-hyun as Song Ha-young
  - Yoon Seo-yeon as young Ha-young

She is the younger sister of the protagonist Song Ha-ran and the older sister of Song Ha-dam. She often acts as a protector for Ha-ran against their pushy grandmother, Kim Na-na. She also works as a junior designer on the design team at Nana Atelier.

- Oh Ye-ju as Song Ha-dam

She is the youngest sister. Though she appears to be the most resilient sister—ranking first in her class and handling her affairs independently—this is actually a survival tactic to avoid being seen as a "pitiful child" due to her family's past.

Chan's Family

- Kang Ae-shim as Chan's grandmother (Kim Seon). She is a master ceramicist. Unlike Chan's father, Sunwoo Seok, who is authoritarian and distant, his grandmother provides an emotional safety net.
- Jung Hae-kyun as Chan's father (Sunwoo Seok): He is a central figure in Chan's "painful past". Flashbacks reveal that Seok was emotionally and sometimes physically cold toward Chan, eventually sending him abroad to the U.S. to get him out of sight after Chan refused to follow the family's ceramicist path.

==== People around the Song family ====
- Kang Seok-woo as Park Man-jae

He is a barista and runs a quiet alleyway café called "Rest". He acts as a life senior and advisor to the younger generation and has a past with Kim Na-na.

- Kim Tae-young as Cha Yu-gyeom

He is a top national high school baseball pitcher and Ha-dam's boyfriend. He shares a special bond with Ha-dam's grandmother, acting as a reliable grandson figure to her.

==== Nana Atelier ====
- Kwon Hyuk as Yeon Tae-seok

He is the COO of Nana Atelier and is the loyal "right-hand man" to the company's head. It is slowly revealed that his connection with the Nana family and Nana Atelier dates back 15 years.

- Jang Yong-won as Je Rae-mi

A perfectionist designer.

- Ki Hyun-woo as Baek Seung-gyu

A junior designer in the Design Team 1 at Nana Atelier.

- Lee Seung-yeon as Jeon Pu-reum

Nana Atelier Design Team 1 Assistant Designer.

- Yoon Chae-bin as Kim Sol

Nana Atelier Design Team 1 Intern.

==== People around Chan ====
- Firas A. Naji as Ben - A friend or colleague from Chan's time in the United States and current work acquintance.
- Kwon Do-hyung as Kang Hyuk-chan - He was Sunwoo Chan's university colleague in the U.S. and Song Ha-ran's former boyfriend who tragically died in the explosion seven years ago.

== Production ==
=== Development ===
The series is planned by Namgoong Sung-woo, co-directed by Jeong Sang-hee and Kim Young-jae, written by Jo Sung-hee, and produced by Pan Entertainment.

On November 13, 2025, Pan Entertainment announced that it had signed a production and supply agreement with MBC worth ₩15.2 billion.

=== Casting ===
In 2023, Han Hyo-joo was initially cast as the female lead, but was later recast with Lee Sung-kyung considering it and Seo In-guk considering the male lead.

In May 2025, Chae Jong-hyeop reportedly received an offer to play the role of Sunwoo Chan, which was initially offered to Seo. In September, the casting of Lee and Chae as the leads was officially confirmed. The next month, Lee Mi-sook, Kang Seok-woo, Han Ji-hyun, Oh Ye-ju, and Ki Hyun-woo joined the cast.

=== Filming ===
Principal photography began in October 2025.

== Release ==
In Your Radiant Season was reportedly scheduled to premiere on MBC TV in the first half of 2026. On January 13, 2026, a script reading was revealed, and the series officially confirmed its premiere on February 20, 2026, airing on a Friday–Saturday timeslot at 21:50 (KST). It will also be available for streaming on Disney+.

== Viewership ==
In Your Radiant Season : South Korea viewers per episode (thousands)

Season	Episode number											
Season	1	2	3	4	5	6	7	8	9	10	11	12
1	835	693	798	550	724	554	579	491	N/A	456	482	548

Source: Audience measurement performed nationwide by Nielsen Korea.

Average TV viewership ratings
Ep.	Original broadcast date	Average audience share (Nielsen Korea)	
Ep.	Original broadcast date	Nationwide	Seoul
1	February 20, 2026	4.4% (11th)	4.4% (10th)
2	February 21, 2026	3.5% (14th)	3.2% (13th)
3	February 27, 2026	4.3% (11th)	4.1% (10th)
4	February 28, 2026	3.1% (18th)	3.1% (16th)
5	March 6, 2026	4.1% (11th)	4.1% (9th)
6	March 13, 2026	2.9% (18th)	2.7% (18th)
7	March 14, 2026	2.8% (21st)	N/A
8	March 20, 2026	2.9% (19th)	2.8% (16th)
9	March 21, 2026	2.3% (23rd)	N/A
10	March 27, 2026	2.6% (19th)	2.1% (19th)
11	March 28, 2026	2.5% (20th)	N/A
12	April 3, 2026	3.1% (13th)	2.8% (13th)
Average		3.2%	— (Note: Due to multiple unpublished ratings, the exact average rating is unknown.)
In the table above, the blue numbers represent the lowest ratings and the red numbers represent the highest ratings.; N/A denotes ratings that were not published.
