= Ki Hyun-woo =

South Korean actor (born 2000)

- Born: December 27, 2000 (age 25); South Korea
- Occupation: Actor
- Years active: 2021–present
- Agent: Hogiroun Company

Korean name
- Hangul: 기현우
- RR: Gi Hyeonu
- MR: Ki Hyŏnu

Ki Hyun-woo (Korean: 기현우; born December 27, 2000) is a South Korean actor under Hogiroun Company. He is best known for Jinx (2021), his first debut, and Jun & Jun (2023).

== Early life ==
Ki was born on December 27, 2000, in South Korea.

== Career ==
Ki made his debut in Jinx (2021). He then played Choi Jun in Jun and Jun (2023).

On March 20, 2024, Ki signed an exclusive contract with Hogiroun Company.

== Filmography ==
=== Film ===
Year	Title	Role	Ref.
2026	Made in Intaewon	Hyeong-sik	

=== Television series ===
Year	Title	Role	Ref.
2021	Jinx	Min Cheol	
2023	Jun & Jun	Choi Jun	
2024	The Chairman Is Level 9	Pil Da-hee	
2024	Love Andante	Nam Kyung-ho	
2026	In Your Radiant Season	Baek Seung-gyu	

=== Web series ===
Year	Title	Role	Ref.
2025	The Tyrant's Bride to Be		

== Awards and nominations ==
Name of the award ceremony, year presented, award category, nominee(s) of the award, and the result of the nomination
Award ceremony	Year	Category	Nominee(s) / Work(s)	Result	Ref.
2024 Korea Best Brand Awards	2024	Acting	Himself	Won	
