= The All-Round Wife =

2021 South Korean television daily drama

- Promotional concept poster
- Also known as: National Wife
- Hangul: 국가대표 와이프
- Lit.: National Team Wife
- RR: Gukgadaepyo waipeu
- MR: Kukkadaep'yo waip'ŭ
- Genre: Drama; Melodrama; Family
- Created by: Ki Min-soo; KBS Drama Division
- Written by: Kim Ji-wan
- Directed by: Choi Ji-young
- Starring: Han Da-gam; Han Sang-jin; Shin Seung-hwan; Seo In-seok; Shim Ji-ho
- Music by: Kim Eui-yong
- Country of origin: South Korea
- Original language: Korean
- No. of episodes: 122

Production
- Executive producer: Kang Byung-taek (KBS)
- Producer: Kim Hae-jeong
- Camera setup: Single-camera
- Running time: 35 minutes
- Production company: KBS Drama Center

Original release
- Network: KBS1
- Release: October 4, 2021 – April 8, 2022

The All-Round Wife (Korean: 국가대표 와이프) was a South Korean television series starring Han Da-gam, Han Sang-jin, Shin Seung-hwan, and Shim Ji-ho. The series directed by Choi Ji-young, revolves around Seo Cho-hee, who struggles to raise the standard of life through a house in Gangnam, but she realizes that happiness is not about the house, but the loving people living in the house who care for each other. The daily drama premiered on KBS1 on October 4, 2021, and aired every weekday at 20:30 (KST) for 122 episodes till April 8, 2022.

== Synopsis ==
Story of the TV series revolves around Seo Cho-hee (Han Da-gam) and her husband Kang Nam-goo (Han Sang-jin), who endeavour to raise their standard of life through a house in Gangnam. In the end, they get the realisation that it is the people who live in the house bring happiness and not the house they live in.

== Cast ==
=== Main ===
- Han Eun-jung as Seo Cho-hee, 38 years old

12-year-old advertising company AE

- Han Sang-jin as Kang Nam-goo, 41 years old

Seo Cho-hee's husband, Han River University associate professor

- Shim Ji-ho as Seo Kang-rim, 37 years old, a divorce lawyer
- Shin Hyun-tak as Kang Seok-goo, 33 years old, Kang Nam-goo's younger brother

=== Supporting ===
==== People around Seo Cho-hee ====
- Yoon Da-young as Seo Bo-ri, 32 years old

The younger sister of Seo Cho-hee and Seo Kang-rim, she likes to get attention from a young age and liked idols and became a trainee singer.

- Yang Mi-kyung as Oh Jang-geum, 63 years old

Seo Cho-hee's mother, she raised three children by running a side dish shop alone without a husband for over 30 years.

- Geum Bo-ra as Dook Na-ra 65 years old

Seo Cho-hee's mother-in-law, she was the president's wife, but one morning she lost her husband

- Jo Eun-sook as Oh Poong-geum, 53 years old

Seo Cho-hee's aunt, and Jang-geum's side dish employee. Because she only learned about dating from books. She is often deceived by men and cries. But still dreaming of running away alone.

- Kim Tae-yeon as Kang Ri-an, 10 years old, Cho-hee's daughter

==== Won-ju and people around her ====
- Jo Hyang-gi as Noh Won-ju, 38 years old, high school classmate of Cho-hee

Bang Hyeong-do's wife, she felt inferior to Cho-hee. But now, she is a daughter-in-law of a wealthy family and lives in a high-end apartment in Gangnam and is envious of her classmates

- Shin Seung-hwan as Bang Hyeong-do, 42 years old, Wonju's husband

The eldest son of a multi-billionaire semi-rich. He is a man who dreams of one day having a full life with the legacy left by his father.

- Lee Chae-bin as Bang Sa-rang, 10 years old, Won-ju's daughter
- Ahn Suk-hwan as Bang Bae-su, Bang Hyeong-do's father

==== People at Com2Me Company ====
- Kim Deok-hyun as Go Seong-man, 47 years old, CEO of Com2Me
- Han Jeong-woo as Yang Jae-min, 35 years old, Head of Com2Me

Colleague of Seo Cho-hee and only son of the AJ Group president

- Kim Ga-ran as Yeo Eui-kyung, 33 years old, member of Com2Me Planning Team 1

An employee of advertising agency where Seo So-hee works

- Ahn Jung-ho as Ok Soo Hyun, 29 years old, member of Com2Me Planning Team 1

A subordinate of Seo Cho-hee's advertising agency

- Kim Jae-in as Ku Ro-mi, 28 years old, member of Com2Me Planning Team 1
- Han So-hyun as Mary Lee, 27 years old, member of Com2Me Planning Team 1
- Moon Il-taek as Moon Jung-gyu

Head of the 2nd Planning Team of an Advertising Company. He's a colleague and rival to the 1st planning team leader Seo Cho-hee, and is jealous of her.

==== Han River University ====
- Jung Bo-min as Han Seul-ah, 24 years old, Han River University college student

She is the most positive and strong character in the world. She hates to ask anyone for help, rather she will solve her problem on her own.

- Oh Yu-na as Choi Seon-hae, 38 years old, assistant professor at Han River University, high school classmate of Seo Cho-hee
- Kim Chae-yoon as Song Pa-ran, 24 years old, Han River University college student, daughter of Cho-hee's cousin sister-in-law
- Lee Myung-jun as Kim Dong-ha

A fresh college student, Han Seul-ah's college classmate.

- Yuju as Gong Ju-ah, 24 years old, Han River University college student

Distinguished in education and beauty as the daughter of a wealthy family

=== Special appearance ===
- Lee Eun-yul as Seo-jin's mother (Ep.1)

== Production ==
Shin Hyun-tak came back to TV series after a gap of 6 years. He last appeared in the 2014 school drama Hi! School: Love On.

On November 17, 2021, it was reported that actress Yoon Da-young was diagnosed with Corona 19 and the production team has suspended filming following guidelines for prevention of further spread of the pandemic. On November 18, 2021, it was reported that one of the actor was positive, but was asymptomatic, so they plan to continue filming while monitoring the situation. On December 1, 2021, it was reported that actress Yoon Da-young has recovered from COVID-19 and returned to filming of the drama. Later, on December 2, 2021, the actress's agency Yoon Da Young has confirmed that she has recovered from the infection and is back to filming normally.

== Release ==
The daily drama was premiered on KBS1 on October 4, 2021, and aired every weekday at 20:30 (KST).

From November 29 to December 3, a special broadcast featuring the contents of Episodes 1 to 40 were aired.

The series ended on April 8, 2022, by airing the 122nd episode, 2 more than the initially planned 120 episodes.

== Original soundtrack ==
The All-Round Wife

Soundtrack album by Various
- Released: 2021
- Genre: Soundtrack
- Languages: Korean; English
- Labels: Layun Wellness; Interpark Co., Ltd

=== Part 1 ===
Released on November 8, 2021
No.	Title	Lyrics	Music	Artist	Length
1.	"Come to Me, Always Your Smile" (다가와 늘 네 미소가)	Island Papaya	Kim Ui-yong, Lee Ji-yong	Soyeon (LABOUM)	3:15
2.	"Come to Me, Always Your Smile" (Inst.)				3:15

=== Part 2 ===
Released on November 15, 2021
No.	Title	Lyrics	Music	Artist	Length
1.	"Dream Song" (꿈의 노래)	Island Papaya	Hwang Yong-joo	Momoland	3:01
2.	"Dream Song" (Inst.)				3:01

=== Part 3 ===
Released on November 29, 2021
No.	Title	Artist	Length
1.	"Cheer Up Life" (힘내라 인생)	Park Seo-jin	3:24
2.	"Cheer Up Life" (Inst.)		3:24

=== Part 4 ===
Released on December 6, 2021
No.	Title	Lyrics	Music	Artist	Length
1.	"Will You Be a Star" (별이될래)	Kim Ui-yong, Keyman	Kim Ui-yong, Keyman	Lee-Nu	3:58
2.	"Will You Be a Star" (Inst.)				3:58

=== Part 5 ===
Released on January 6, 2022
No.	Title	Lyrics	Music	Artist	Length
1.	"My Alice" (마이 앨리스)	AliceS30	Hwang Yong-joo, Cho Dae-min	Hey Girls	3:07
2.	"My Alice" (Inst.)				3:07

=== Part 6 ===
Released on January 18, 2022
No.	Title	Lyrics	Music	Artist	Length
1.	"You in Me" (내 안에 있는 너)	Kim Ui-yong, Keyman	Kim Ui-yong, Keyman	Rainfall	4:18
2.	"You in Me" (Inst.)				4:18

=== Part 7 ===
Released on January 19, 2022
No.	Title	Lyrics	Music	Artist	Length
1.	"I'm Here" (여기있어요)	Kim Ui-yong, Keyman	Kim Ui-yong, Keyman	Gna	4:13
2.	"I'm Here" (Inst.)				4:13

=== Part 8 ===
Released on March 14, 2022
No.	Title	Lyrics	Music	Artist	Length
1.	"Consolation" (위로)	Kim Eui-yong, Keyman	Kim Ui-yong, Keyman	Lee Hye-eun	4:27
2.	"Consolation" (Inst.)				4:27

== Viewership ==
Audience response

The All-Round Wife : South Korea viewers per episode (millions)

Episodes	Episode number																			
Episodes	1	2	3	4	5	6	7	8	9	10	11	12	13	14	15	16	17	18	19	20
1–20	2.799	2.213	1.954	2.238	2.022	2.546	2.142	2.200	2.303	1.922	2.240	2.057	2.057	2.351	1.844	2.252	1.959	2.047	2.328	2.070
21–40	2.184	2.143	2.178	2.429	1.917	2.442	2.092	2.025	2.114	2.007	2.061	2.106	2.137	2.235	2.082	2.399	2.213	2.291	2.411	2.165
41–60	2.303	2.151	2.086	2.455	2.289	2.425	2.209	2.282	2.505	2.334	2.677	2.296	2.432	2.524	2.458	2.678	2.457	2.516	2.699	2.511
61–80	2.882	2.638	2.734	2.914	2.964	2.862	2.636	2.837	3.029	2.757	3.021	2.868	2.974	3.035	2.902	3.111	3.092	2.763	3.082	2.915
81–100	1.563	2.189	2.756	2.018	2.145	2.754	2.697	1.785	2.387	2.700	2.840	2.802	2.795	3.032	3.032	3.066	3.097	3.076	3.190	2.741
101–120	3.063	3.058	3.245	2.947	3.081	3.122	3.007	3.075	2.934	2.914	2.834	2.865	2.998	2.807	2.877	3.102	2.856	3.047	2.828	2.881
121–122	2.960	2.908	–																	

Source: Audience measurement performed nationwide by Nielsen Korea.

Ep.	Broadcast date	Average audience share		
Ep.	Broadcast date	Nielsen Korea		TNmS
Ep.	Broadcast date	Nationwide	Seoul	Nationwide
1	October 4, 2021	17.1% (2nd)	15.9% (1st)	15.6% (2nd)
2	October 5, 2021	13.5% (2nd)	12.0% (2nd)	13.7% (2nd)
3	October 6, 2021	12.2% (2nd)	10.2% (2nd)	13.9% (2nd)
4	October 7, 2021	13.9% (2nd)	12.4% (2nd)	12.9% (2nd)
5	October 8, 2021	12.5% (3rd)	11.1% (3rd)	12.4% (3rd)
6	October 11, 2021	16.0% (2nd)	15.1% (1st)	14.9% (2nd)
7	October 12, 2021	13.2% (2nd)	11.9% (2nd)	12.3% (2nd)
8	October 13, 2021	13.3% (2nd)	11.6% (2nd)	13.2% (2nd)
9	October 14, 2021	14.2% (2nd)	13.1% (2nd)	14.6% (2nd)
10	October 15, 2021	11.7% (3rd)	10.3% (3rd)	11.8% (2nd)
11	October 18, 2021	14.3% (2nd)	12.3% (2nd)	14.9% (2nd)
12	October 19, 2021	13.0% (2nd)	11.6% (2nd)	12.1% (2nd)
13	October 20, 2021	13.2% (2nd)	11.1% (2nd)	12.1% (2nd)
14	October 21, 2021	14.4% (2nd)	12.6% (2nd)	14.2% (2nd)
15	October 22, 2021	12.4% (3rd)	10.9% (3rd)	12.4% (2nd)
16	October 25, 2021	13.9% (2nd)	12.1% (2nd)	14.3% (2nd)
17	October 26, 2021	12.8% (2nd)	10.9% (2nd)	11.9% (2nd)
18	October 27, 2021	12.9% (2nd)	10.9% (2nd)	12.3% (2nd)
19	October 28, 2021	15.2% (2nd)	13.6% (2nd)	14.8% (2nd)
20	October 29, 2021	13.1% (3rd)	11.3% (3rd)	13.5% (2nd)
21	November 1, 2021	14.2% (2nd)	12.4% (2nd)	14.8% (2nd)
22	November 2, 2021	13.8% (2nd)	11.7% (2nd)	14.1% (2nd)
23	November 3, 2021	13.8% (2nd)	11.6% (2nd)	13.9% (2nd)
24	November 4, 2021	15.0% (2nd)	13.2% (2nd)	14.4% (2nd)
25	November 5, 2021	12.4% (3rd)	10.3% (3rd)	12.6% (3rd)
26	November 8, 2021	15.1% (2nd)	13.4% (2nd)	14.3% (2nd)
27	November 9, 2021	13.0% (1st)	11.8% (1st)	12.0% (1st)
28	November 10, 2021	12.8% (2nd)	11.0% (2nd)	12.6% (2nd)
29	November 11, 2021	13.5% (2nd)	11.8% (2nd)	13.5% (2nd)
30	November 12, 2021	13.1% (2nd)	11.3% (2nd)	—N/a
31	November 15, 2021	12.8% (1st)	11.4% (1st)	13.3% (1st)
32	November 16, 2021	13.4% (2nd)	11.4% (2nd)	13.0% (2nd)
33	November 17, 2021	13.4% (2nd)	12.0% (2nd)	13.4% (2nd)
34	November 18, 2021	14.0% (2nd)	12.0% (2nd)	13.2% (2nd)
35	November 19, 2021	13.2% (2nd)	11.7% (2nd)	13.5% (2nd)
36	November 22, 2021	15.5% (2nd)	13.9% (2nd)	15.3% (2nd)
37	November 23, 2021	13.8% (2nd)	11.8% (2nd)	13.6% (2nd)
38	November 24, 2021	14.2% (2nd)	12.7% (2nd)	14.1% (2nd)
39	November 25, 2021	15.6% (2nd)	14.4% (2nd)	15.5% (2nd)
40	November 26, 2021	14.0% (2nd)	12.5% (2nd)	14.2% (2nd)
41	December 6, 2021 (Note: Due to COVID-19 aftermath the episode 41 was aired on December 6, 2021.)	14.4% (2nd)	12.7% (2nd)	13.4% (2nd)
42	December 7, 2021	13.7% (2nd)	12.4% (2nd)	—N/a
43	December 8, 2021	13.2% (2nd)	11.4% (2nd)	13.7% (2nd)
44	December 9, 2021	15.9% (2nd)	13.7% (2nd)	16.4% (2nd)
45	December 10, 2021	15.0% (2nd)	13.9% (2nd)	14.3% (2nd)
46	December 13, 2021	15.5% (1st)	14.4% (1st)	13.3% (1st)
47	December 14, 2021	14.0% (1st)	12.7% (1st)	13.9% (1st)
48	December 15, 2021	14.1% (1st)	12.7% (1st)	14.2% (1st)
49	December 16, 2021	16.1% (1st)	14.7% (1st)	14.9% (1st)
50	December 17, 2021	15.4% (1st)	14.9% (1st)	15.0% (1st)
51	December 20, 2021	17.0% (1st)	15.4% (1st)	16.5% (1st)
52	December 21, 2021	15.3% (1st)	13.3% (1st)	15.1% (1st)
53	December 22, 2021	15.8% (1st)	14.6% (1st)	15.4% (1st)
54	December 23, 2021	16.7% (1st)	15.1% (1st)	17.1% (1st)
55	December 24, 2021	14.9% (1st)	13.9% (1st)	15.0% (1st)
56	December 27, 2021	16.7% (1st)	14.9% (1st)	15.2% (1st)
57	December 28, 2021	15.5% (1st)	13.5% (1st)	14.6% (1st)
58	December 29, 2021	15.7% (1st)	13.9% (1st)	15.0% (1st)
59	December 30, 2021	17.1% (1st)	15.2% (1st)	16.7% (1st)
60	December 31, 2021	15.2% (1st)	13.7% (1st)	15.6% (1st)
61	January 3, 2022	18.3% (1st)	16.9% (1st)	15.9% (1st)
62	January 4, 2022	16.3% (1st)	14.7% (1st)	14.5% (1st)
63	January 5, 2022	16.8% (1st)	15.3% (1st)	15.1% (1st)
64	January 6, 2022	18.2% (1st)	16.8% (1st)	14.8% (1st)
65	January 7, 2022	17.9% (1st)	16.5% (1st)	14.8% (1st)
66	January 10, 2022	17.5% (1st)	15.7% (1st)	15.5% (1st)
67	January 11, 2022	16.4% (1st)	14.5% (1st)	13.8% (1st)
68	January 12, 2022	17.7% (1st)	16.4% (1st)	—N/a
69	January 13, 2022	18.2% (1st)	16.9% (1st)	15.1% (1st)
70	January 14, 2022	17.0% (1st)	—N/a	15.0% (1st)
71	January 17, 2022	18.8% (1st)	16.9% (1st)	16.0% (1st)
72	January 18, 2022	16.8% (1st)	15.5% (1st)	14.2% (1st)
73	January 19, 2022	18.0% (1st)	16.6% (1st)	16.2% (1st)
74	January 20, 2022	18.5% (1st)	17.6% (1st)	15.8% (1st)
75	January 21, 2022	17.3% (1st)	15.5% (1st)	14.9% (1st)
76	January 24, 2022	18.5% (1st)	17.1% (1st)	15.9% (1st)
77	January 25, 2022	17.9% (1st)	16.7% (1st)	17.0% (1st)
78	January 26, 2022	16.6% (1st)	14.8% (1st)	15.7% (1st)
79	January 27, 2022	18.6% (1st)	17.8% (1st)	16.2% (1st)
80	January 28, 2022	17.2% (1st)	16.2% (1st)	14.1% (1st)
81	January 31, 2022	9.7% (2nd)	9.0% (2nd)	7.4% (3rd)
82	February 1, 2022	12.3% (1st)	11.4% (1st)	10.6% (1st)
83	February 2, 2022	16.4% (1st)	15.2% (1st)	15.1% (1st)
84	February 7, 2022 (Note: The 84th episode was cancelled for February 3 and 4, due to telecast of Presidential debate and 2022 Beijing Winter Olympics start.)	12.8% (1st)	11.5% (1st)	11.2% (1st)
85	February 8, 2022	13.7% (1st)	12.9% (1st)	12.7% (1st)
86	February 9, 2022	14.7% (1st)	13.8% (2nd)	13.3% (1st)
87	February 10, 2022	16.5% (1st)	15.2% (1st)	14.8% (1st)
88	February 11, 2022	10.9% (1st)	10.9% (1st)	10.6% (1st)
89	February 14, 2022	15.0% (1st)	13.7% (1st)	12.1% (1st)
90	February 15, 2022	16.1% (1st)	14.9% (1st)	15.2% (1st)
91	February 17, 2022	17.1% (1st)	15.6% (1st)	15.3% (1st)
92	February 18, 2022	17.3% (1st)	16.1% (1st)	16.2% (1st)
93	February 22, 2022	16.6% (1st)	15.2% (1st)	16.1% (1st)
94	February 23, 2022	18.0% (1st)	16.5% (1st)	18.0% (1st)
95	February 24, 2022	18.3% (1st)	17.0% (1st)	17.7% (1st)
96	February 28, 2022	18.7% (1st)	17.5% (1st)	17.6% (1st)
97	March 1, 2022	18.2% (1st)	17.3% (1st)	16.6% (1st)
98	March 3, 2022	18.3% (1st)	17.3% (1st)	16.9% (1st)
99	March 7, 2022 (Note: The 99th episode was cancelled for March 4, due to telecast of 2022 Winter Paralympics opening ceremony.)	19.5% (1st)	17.2% (1st)	17.5% (1st)
100	March 8, 2022	17.3% (1st)	15.4% (1st)	16.1% (2nd)
101	March 10, 2022	18.9% (1st)	17.4% (1st)	18.0% (1st)
102	March 11, 2022	17.9% (1st)	16.7% (1st)	17.8% (1st)
103	March 14, 2022	19.3% (1st)	18.6% (1st)	19.0% (1st)
104	March 15, 2022	18.0% (1st)	16.8% (1st)	17.1% (1st)
105	March 16, 2022	18.6% (1st)	17.2% (1st)	18.1% (1st)
106	March 17, 2022	19.0% (1st)	17.8% (1st)	18.7% (1st)
107	March 18, 2022	17.9% (1st)	16.8% (1st)	17.5% (1st)
108	March 21, 2022	18.8% (1st)	17.5% (1st)	18.9% (1st)
109	March 22, 2022	17.6% (1st)	15.8% (1st)	16.7% (1st)
110	March 23, 2022	18.0% (1st)	16.2% (1st)	18.2% (1st)
111	March 24, 2022	17.2% (1st)	15.9% (1st)	17.0% (1st)
112	March 25, 2022	17.2% (1st)	15.8% (1st)	15.4% (1st)
113	March 28, 2022	18.7% (1st)	17.8% (1st)	17.4% (1st)
114	March 29, 2022	17.8% (1st)	16.8% (1st)	17.3% (1st)
115	March 30, 2022	18.1% (1st)	16.5% (1st)	17.6% (1st)
116	March 31, 2022	19.0% (1st)	17.3% (1st)	17.6% (1st)
117	April 1, 2022	16.9% (1st)	15.7% (1st)	17.1% (1st)
118	April 4, 2022	18.9% (1st)	17.5% (1st)	17.5% (1st)
119	April 5, 2022	17.9% (1st)	16.8% (1st)	16.8% (1st)
120	April 6, 2022	17.4% (1st)	15.7% (1st)	17.6% (1st)
121	April 7, 2022	18.4% (1st)	16.7% (1st)	N/A
122	April 8, 2022	17.2% (1st)	16.0% (1st)	
Average		%	%	%
Special	November 29, 2021	12.9% (2nd)	11.4% (2nd)	12.4% (2nd)
Special	November 30, 2021	9.6% (4th)	8.3% (3rd)	10.4% (2nd)
Special	December 1, 2021	8.3% (7th)	7.2% (9th)	9.0% (6th)
Special	December 2, 2021	8.8% (5th)	8.1% (6th)	10.3% (3rd)
Special	December 3, 2021	6.9% (9th)	6.1% (12th)	—N/a
In the table above, the blue numbers represent the lowest ratings and the red numbers represent the highest ratings.; NR denotes that the series did not rank in the top 20 daily programs on that date.; N/A denotes that the rating is not known.

== Awards and nominations ==
Year	Award	Category	Recipient	Result	Ref.
2021	KBS Drama Awards	Excellence Award, Actress in a Daily Drama	Handa Gam	Won	
2022	APAN Star Awards	Excellence Award, Actor in a Serial Drama	Han Sang-jin	Won	
2022	APAN Star Awards	Excellence Award, Actress in a Serial Drama	Handa Gam	Nominated	
