= Song Ji-woo =

South Korean actress (born 1997)

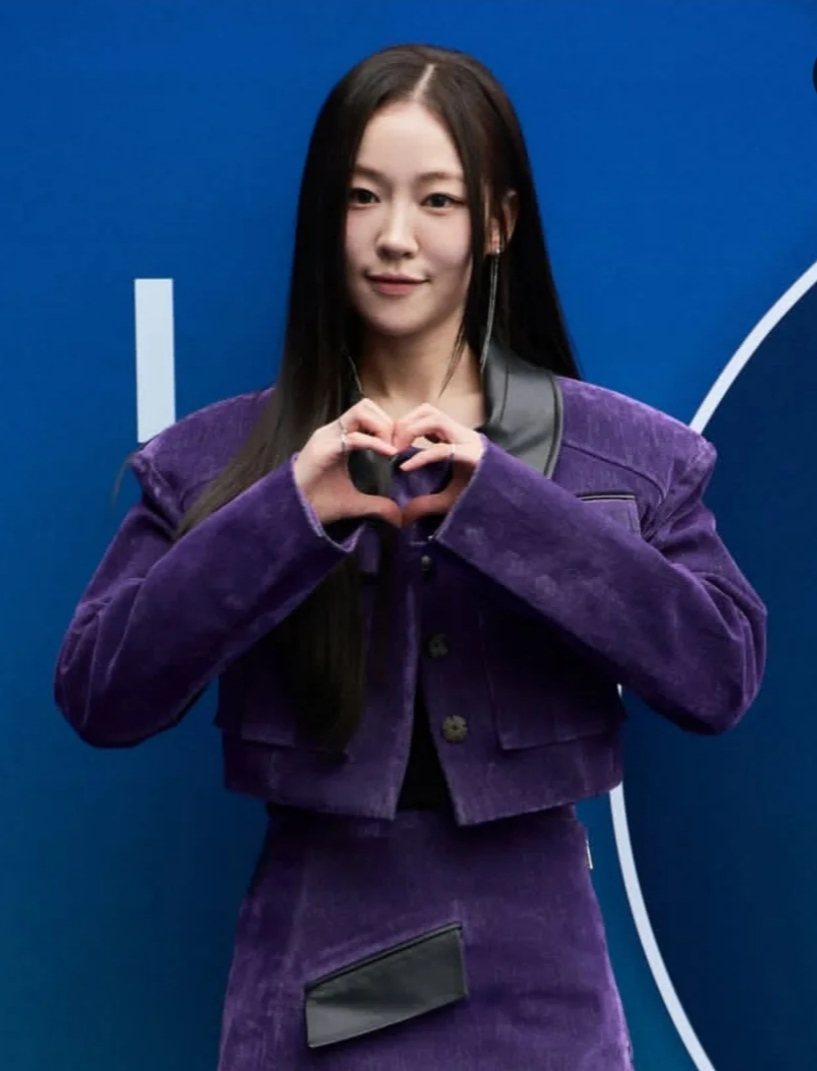
- Song in 2026
- Born: December 15, 1997 (age 28); Anyang, Gyeonggi, South Korea
- Occupation: Actress
- Agent: Management Run

Korean name
- Hangul: 송지우
- RR: Song Jiu
- MR: Song Chiu

Song Ji-woo (Korean: 송지우; born December 15, 1997) is a South Korean actress. She is best known for portraying Kang Mi-na in the Netflix series Squid Game 2 (2024).

== Filmography ==
=== Television series ===
Key
†	Denotes television productions that have not yet been released

Year	Title	Role	Notes	Ref.
2019	Blessing of the Sea		Acting debut	
2019	Welcome 2 Life	Da-som		
2019	Extraordinary You	Ae-ri		
2019	Queen: Love and War	Jong-hui		
2020	Eccentric! Chef Moon	Kong Hyo-sook		
2021	Love Scene Number	Oh Han-na		
2021	Shh! Please Take Care of Him	Su-jin		
2022–2023	The Forbidden Marriage	Ye Hyeon-hui		
2023	Love to Hate You	Hwang Ji-hye		
2023	A Time Called You	Byeon Da-hyeon		
2024	Captivating the King		Cameo appearance	
2024	Doctor Slump	Do Hye-ji		
2024	Dreaming of a Freaking Fairy Tale	Ban Da-ah		
2024	Love Andante	Ha Na-kyung		
2024	Gangnam B-Side	Oh Jin-young		
2026	To My Beloved Thief	Geum Nok		
2026	A Love Other Than Yours †	Song Hae-na		

=== Web series ===
Year	Title	Role	Notes	Network	Ref.
2022–2023	The Glory	Choi Hye-jeong	Young appearance	Netflix	
2024	Squid Game 2	Kang Mi-na / Player 196	Season 2	Netflix	

== Awards and nominations ==
Name of the award ceremony, year presented, award category, nominee(s) of the award, and the result of the nomination
Award ceremony	Year	Category	Nominee(s) / Work(s)	Result	Ref.
Korea Hallyu Entertainment Awards	2024	Rising Star Award for Actress	—N/a	Won	
