= Cherry Bullet =

South Korean girl group

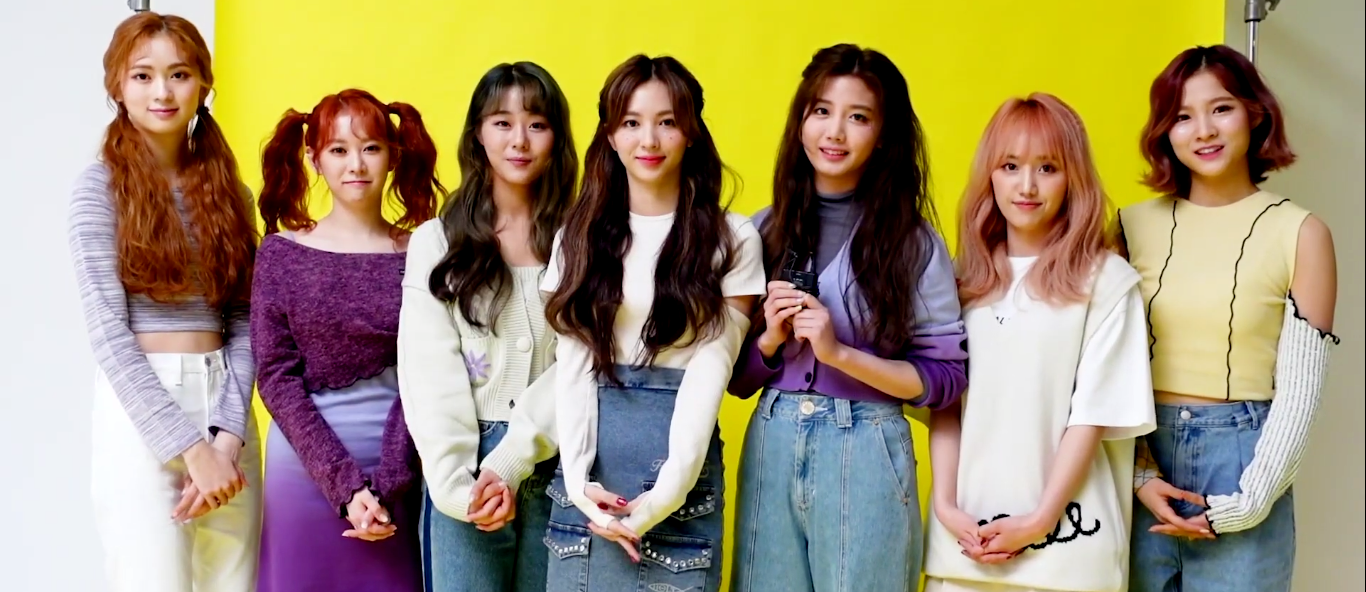
- Cherry Bullet in February 2021; From left to right: May, Bora, Chaerin, Jiwon, Yuju, Haeyoon, and Remi.

Background information
- Origin: Seoul, South Korea
- Genres: K-pop; bubblegum pop; dance pop; teen pop
- Years active: 2019–2024
- Labels: FNC; FNC W
- Past members: Haeyoon; Yuju; Mirae; Bora; Jiwon; Kokoro; Remi; Chaerin; Linlin; May
- Website: Official Website

Cherry Bullet (Korean: 체리블렛) was a South Korean girl group formed and managed by FNC Entertainment. They debuted on January 21, 2019, with their first single album titled Let's Play Cherry Bullet. The group's final lineup was composed of seven members: Haeyoon, Yuju, Bora, Jiwon, Remi, Chaerin, and May. Originally consisting of ten members, Mirae, Kokoro, and Linlin left the group in December 2019. After five years of group activities, the group disbanded on April 22, 2024 after four out of the seven members terminated their contracts with FNC Entertainment.

== History ==
=== Pre-debut ===
Haeyoon was previously introduced as one of the female trainees to represent FNC Entertainment on the Mnet survival show, Produce 48 in 2018. She finished in 19th place and hence did not become a member of the produced girl group, Iz*One.

Bora previously was a trainee at Music K Entertainment. Both she and fellow member Yuju appeared in BTS' Love Yourself: Her highlight reel, with Yuju also making an appearance in Honeyst's "Someone to Love" music video.

Jiwon auditioned for the first season of SBS' K-pop Star with the song "Because of You" by Kelly Clarkson and later became a trainee under Starship Entertainment. In 2012 she appeared in Starship Planet's "White Love" music video.

Remi was a trainee with Avex Proworks and first appeared in the live-action segments of Pretty Rhythm: Dear My Future in 2012 as one of the Prism Mates but did not pass the audition to become an official member. She modeled for Repipi Armario at Point 65th Fashion Show's 2014 Spring Collection. Kokoro was also a student at Avex Artist Academy in Nagoya, Japan, and she was scouted by FNC Entertainment in 2016.

=== 2018–2020: Debut with Let's Play Cherry Bullet, members departure, and digital singles ===
The group's debut reality show Insider Channel Cherry Bullet premiered on November 28, 2018, on Mnet. The reality show was made to introduce the group and each of its 10 members to viewers.

Their first single album, Let's Play Cherry Bullet was released on January 21, 2019, with consisted of the lead single "Q&A", and two other songs, "Violet" and "Stick Out". They held their debut showcase on the same day at YES24 Live Hall in Gwangjin District, Seoul. On May 9, 2019, it was revealed that Cherry Bullet would come back on May 22 with their second single Love Adventure with lead single "Really Really".

On December 13, 2019, FNC announced that Mirae, Kokoro, and Linlin had left the group and terminated their contracts for personal reasons. The remaining members of Cherry Bullet would then continue as a seven-member group with no additional members, and Haeyoon would then take over as the new leader of the group.

The group released their first digital single "Hands Up" on February 11, 2020. On August 6, 2020, Cherry Bullet made their comeback with the new digital single "Aloha Oe".

=== 2021–2023: Cherry Rush, Girls Planet 999, Cherry Wish, Cherry Dash, and Queendom Puzzle ===
On January 4, 2021, it was announced that Cherry Bullet have joined the social media platform Weverse. The group released their first EP Cherry Rush and its lead single "Love So Sweet" on January 20. On February 3, 2021, it was announced that Cherry Bullet would be managed by FNC Entertainment's new sub-label, FNC W, which is specialized for girl groups.

Bora, Jiwon, and May took part in the Mnet survival show Girls Planet 999, which aired from August 6, 2021, to October 22, 2021. Jiwon was eliminated in episode 8, finishing in 16th place in K-Group. May was eliminated in episode 11, finishing in 8th place in J-Group and 24th place overall. Bora was eliminated in the final episode, placing 9th in K-Group and 15th place overall.

On March 2, 2022, Cherry Bullet released their second EP Cherry Wish and its lead single "Love In Space".

On March 7, 2023, Cherry Bullet released their third and final EP Cherry Dash, and its lead single "P.O.W! (Play On the World)". On May 18, 2023, it was announced that members Bora, Jiwon, and Chaerin would be participating in the Mnet survival show Queendom Puzzle. Chaerin was eliminated in the first elimination round in episode 7, while Jiwon and Bora were eliminated in the second elimination round in episode 9.

=== 2024: Disbandment ===
On April 22, 2024, FNC Entertainment announced that the group had officially disbanded after members Haeyoon, Jiwon, Remi, and May terminated their exclusive contracts with the agency. Yuju, Bora, and Chaerin will remain under FNC for individual activities.

== Endorsements ==
Jiwon and Yuju were models for the Korean uniform brand Smart in 2018, alongside BTS. The members were also selected to represent the brand in 2019.

== Members ==
Adapted from their Naver profile.

- Haeyoon (해윤)
- Yuju (유주)
- Bora (보라)
- Jiwon (지원)
- Remi (레미)
- Chaerin (채린)
- May (메이)
- Mirae (미래)
- Kokoro (코코로)
- Linlin (린린)

== Discography ==
=== Extended plays ===
Title	Details	Peak chart positions	Sales
Title	Details	KOR	Sales
Cherry Rush	Released: January 20, 2021; Label: FNC Entertainment; Formats: CD, digital download, streaming	11	KOR: 14,922
Cherry Wish	Released: March 2, 2022; Label: FNC W; Formats: CD, digital download, streaming; Track listing: 1. "Love In Space"; 2. "Broken"; 3. "Hiccups"; 4. "KKa KKa" (닿을까 말까); 5. "My Boo"	7	KOR: 23,999
Cherry Dash	Released: March 7, 2023; Label: FNC W; Formats: CD, digital download, streaming; Track listing: 1. "POW! (Play On the World)"; 2. "Whistle Like That"; 3. "Cloud Nine"; 4. "Queen"; 5. "A Winter Star" (겨울 별)	7	KOR: 36,962

=== Single albums ===
Title	Details	Peak chart positions	Sales
Title	Details	KOR	Sales
Let's Play Cherry Bullet	Released: January 21, 2019; Label: FNC Entertainment; Formats: CD, digital download, streaming	11	KOR: 16,731
Love Adventure	Released: May 22, 2019; Label: FNC Entertainment; Formats: CD, digital download, streaming	9	KOR: 12,991

=== Singles ===
Title	Year	Peak chart positions			Album
Title	Year	KOR DL	KOR Hot	US World	Album
"Q&A"	2019	—	—	17	Let's Play Cherry Bullet
"Really Really" (네가 참 좋아)	2019	—	—	—	Love Adventure
"Hands Up" (무릎을 탁 치고)	2020	—	99	11	Non-album singles
"Aloha Oe" (알로하오에)	2020	—	—	—	Non-album singles
"Love So Sweet"	2021	40	—	—	Cherry Rush
"Love in Space"	2022	39	—	—	Cherry Wish
"P.O.W! (Play On the World)"	2023	47	—	—	Cherry Dash
"—" denotes items that did not chart or were not released.

== Videography ==
=== Music videos ===
Year	Music video	Director(s)	Ref.
2019	"Q&A"	Ziyong Kim (FantazyLab)	
2019	"Really Really" (네가 참 좋아)	SUNNYVISUAL	
2020	"Hands Up" (무릎을 탁 치고)	JIMMY (VIA Production)	
2020	"Aloha Oe" (알로하오에)	SUNNYVISUAL	
2021	"Love So Sweet"	Naive Creative Production	
2022	"Love In Space"	Kim Ja Kyung (Flexible Pictures)	
2023	"P.O.W! (Play On the World)"	SUNNYVISUAL	

== Filmography ==
=== Television shows ===
Year	Title	Duration	Network
2018–2019	Insider Channel Cherry Bullet	November 28 to January 9	Mnet

== Awards and nominations ==
=== Asia Artist Awards ===
Year	Nominee / work	Award	Result
2019	Cherry Bullet	Popularity Award (Singer)	Nominated
2019	Cherry Bullet	Starnews Popularity Award (Female Group)	Nominated
2021	Cherry Bullet	Female Idol Group Popularity Award	Nominated

=== Genie Music Awards ===
Year	Nominee / work	Award	Result
2019	Cherry Bullet	The Top Artist	Nominated
2019	Cherry Bullet	The Female New Artist	Nominated
2019	Cherry Bullet	Genie Music Popularity Award	Nominated
2019	Cherry Bullet	Global Popularity Award	Nominated

=== Melon Music Awards ===
Year	Nominee / work	Award	Result
2019	Cherry Bullet	Best New Artist Award	Nominated

=== Mnet Asian Music Awards ===
Year	Nominee / work	Award	Result
2019	Cherry Bullet	Artist of the Year	Nominated
2019	Cherry Bullet	Best New Female Artist	Nominated
2019	Cherry Bullet	Worldwide Fans' Choice Top 10	Nominated
2019	Cherry Bullet	2019 Qoo10 Favorite Female Artist	Nominated

=== Seoul Music Awards ===
Year	Nominee / work	Award	Result
2020	Cherry Bullet	Rookie of the Year	Nominated
2020	Cherry Bullet	Popularity Award	Nominated
2020	Cherry Bullet	Hallyu Special Award	Nominated
