= Let's Play Cherry Bullet =

Extended play by Cherry Bullet

Single album by Cherry Bullet
- Released: January 21, 2019
- Recorded: 2018–2019
- Length: 9:46
- Language: Korean
- Label: FNC

Cherry Bullet chronology
Let's Play Cherry Bullet (2019)	Love Adventure (2019)

Singles from Let's Play Cherry Bullet
- 1. "Q&A" Released: January 21, 2019

Music video
- "Q&A" on YouTube

Let's Play Cherry Bullet is the debut single album by South Korean girl group Cherry Bullet. The album was released digitally and physically on January 21, 2019, by FNC Entertainment. The single contains three tracks, including the lead single "Q&A".

== Background and release ==
On January 7, 2019, FNC Entertainment announced via SNS that the group would debut with the single album Let's Play Cherry Bullet.

Concept images featuring each of the members were released from January 8 to January 12. The album contains three tracks, lead single 'Q&A", "Violet" and "Stick Out". The music video teaser was released on January 18. and the full music video on January 21 together with the single release.

== Promotion ==
Cherry Bullet held a live showcase at the YES24 Live Hall in Gwangjin-gu, Seoul on January 21, where they performed "Q&A" along with "Violet" and "Stick Out".

The group started promoting their title track "Q&A" on January 22. They first performed the lead single on Mnet's M Countdown, followed by performances on KBS' Music Bank, MBC's Show! Music Core and SBS' Inkigayo.

== Commercial performance ==
The song "Q&A" debuted at number 17 on the Billboard World Digital Songs chart.

== Track listing ==
No.	Title	Lyrics	Music	Arrangement	Length
1.	"Q&A"	Han Seong Ho, Seo Yong Bae (TENTEN)	Alexander Karlsson, Alexej Viktorovitch, Louise Frick Sveen	Jel	3:26
2.	"Violet"	77Child	Matthew Tishler, Aaron Benward, Felicia Barton, Olivia Holt	Matthew Tishler	3:21
3.	"Stick Out" (눈에 띄네)	Han Seong Ho, Seo Yong Bae (TENTEN)	Erik Lidbom, Han Seung Hoon, Seo Yong Bae (TENTEN)	Erik Lidbom	3:05
Total length:					09:46

== Charts ==
Chart (2019)	Peak position
South Korean Albums (Gaon)	11

== Release history ==
Region	Date	Format	Distributor
Various	January 21, 2019	Digital download	FNC Entertainment; Kakao M
South Korea	January 21, 2019	Digital download	FNC Entertainment; Kakao M
South Korea	January 21, 2019	CD	FNC Entertainment; Kakao M
