= Kocowa =

American online video streaming platform

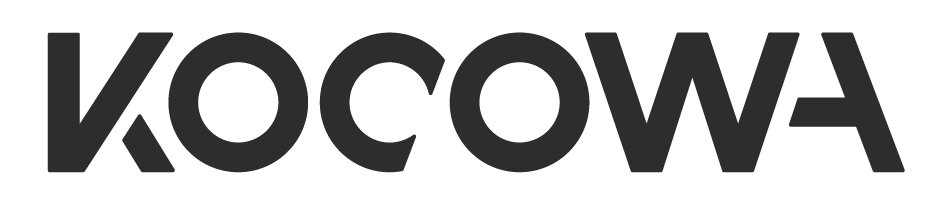
- Website type: OTT platform
- Available in: English, Spanish, Portuguese
- Headquarters: Los Angeles, California, United States
- Area served: Americas, Europe, Oceania
- Owners: wavve Americas (KBS, MBC, SBS and SK Telecom)
- Products: Video streaming
- Website: www.kocowa.com
- Users: 5 million (As of 2020)
- Launched: November 2016; 9 years ago
- Current status: Active

Kocowa (stylized in all-caps) is an American over-the-top subscription video on-demand streaming television service, with limited free access, headquartered in Los Angeles as a joint venture between the top three Korean broadcast networks: KBS, MBC and SBS along with SK Telecom, who co-founded Wavve in South Korea, to provide Korean entertainment including K-dramas, K-reality, K-variety, and K-pop to the Americas and all with multilanguage subtitles.

A subsidiary of Wavve Americas, the name Kocowa stands for Korean Content Wave. Launched in July 2017, it became the IP holder and content broker for its Korean programs to platforms such as Roku, Comcast, Prime Video, and others. In addition to streaming high-quality Korean content with premium subtitles on these platforms, they also offer access to the largest library of K-Dramas via their app.

== History ==
Previous logo

The top three Korean broadcast networks, KBS, MBC and SBS, consolidated their efforts to distribute content globally due to the rising demand for Korean content across the globe. In July 2017, Kocowa launched its streaming services, making them accessible via smart TVs, web, and mobile.

In April 2024, Kocowa launched in Europe and Oceania making it accessible to stream on 39 countries.

== Services ==
Kocowa streams a variety of Korean programs ranging from TV series such as School 2017 and The King in Love, variety shows Running Man and Infinite Challenge, and K-pop music programs including Inkigayo and Music Bank World Tour after being broadcast in Korea.

KOCOWA offers a Live Stream that centers around the platform's three main content categories: Music, Dramas, and Reality. This line-up of content gives users a variety of entertainment options to enjoy while interacting with others on the platform. If subscribers choose to stream on a desktop or laptop, they can chat with other K-drama and K-pop fans in real time. Subscribers who speak English, Portuguese, or Spanish can participate in this interactive experience.

== Business ==
Kocowa is a subscription-based service offering a variety of plans from $0.99 per day, $6.99 per month, or $69.99 annually that provides full access to its programming without ads within six hours after being broadcast in Korea. Those who opt for the advertising-based plan can access new content after one day of its release.

In August 2017, Viki announced a partnership with Kocowa, allowing its Viki Pass Plus subscribers to have additional access to Kocowa programming without a separate subscription on the latter.
