= SF9 discography =

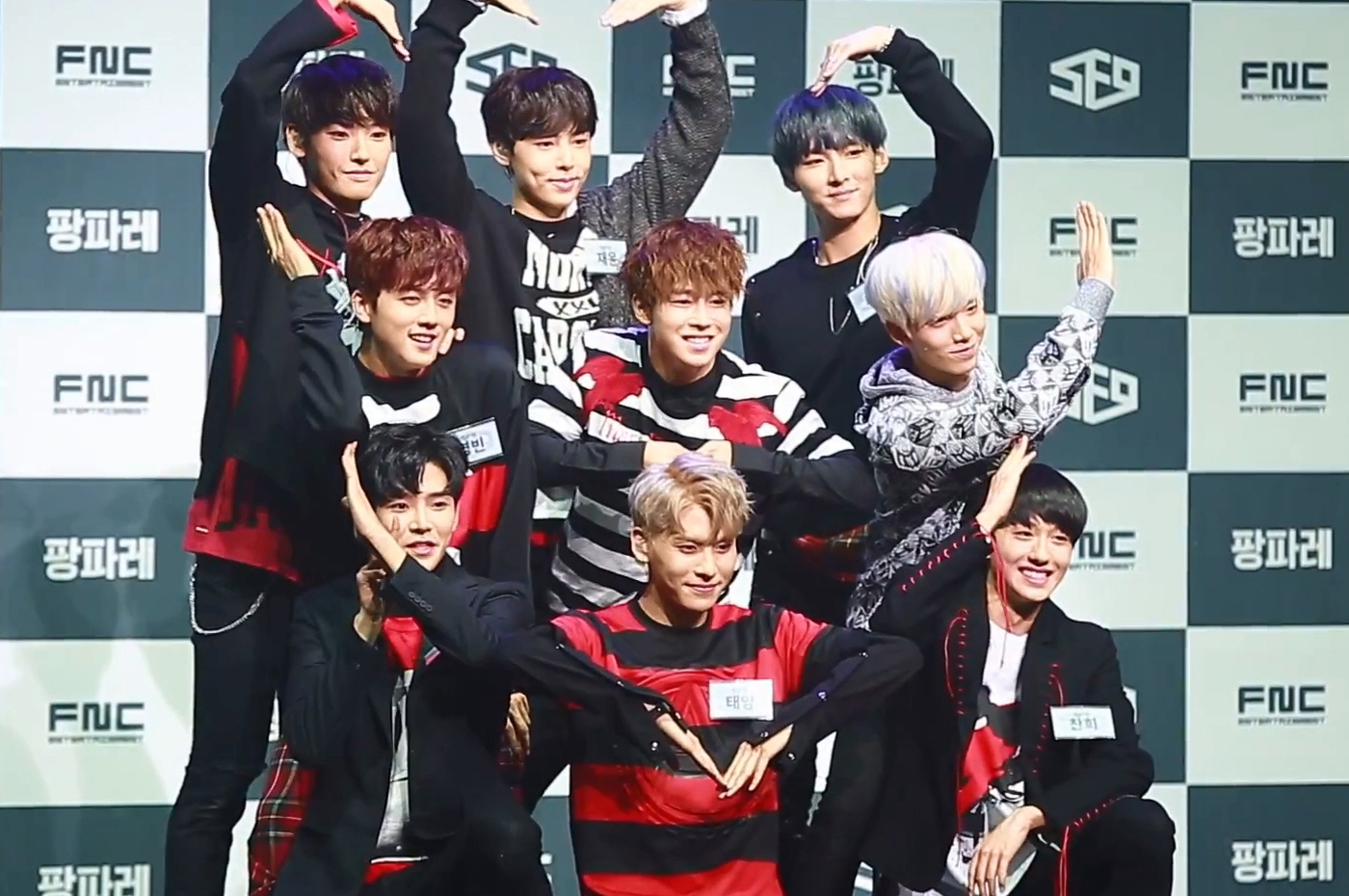
- Studio albums: 5
- EPs: 17
- Compilation albums: 2
- Singles: 29
- Music videos: 24
- Single albums: 2

The discography of South Korean boy band SF9 consists of five studio albums, two compilation albums, seventeen extended plays, two single albums and 29 singles.

== Albums ==
=== Studio albums ===
==== Korean studio albums ====
List of studio albums, showing selected details, selected chart positions, and sales figures
Title	Details	Peak chart positions		Sales
Title	Details	KOR	JPN	Sales
First Collection	Released: January 7, 2020; Label: FNC Entertainment; Formats: CD, digital download, streaming	2	30	KOR: 117,785; JPN: 1,516 (Phy.)
Tenacity	Released: August 26, 2026; Label: FNC Entertainment; Formats: CD, digital download, streaming	7	—	KOR: 94,594

==== Japanese studio albums ====
List of studio albums, showing selected details, selected chart positions, and sales figures
Title	Details	Peak chart positions	Sales
Title	Details	JPN	Sales
Sensational Feeling Nine	Released: December 13, 2017; Label: Warner Music Japan; Formats: CD, digital download, streaming; Track listing: 1. "O Sole Mio" (僕の太陽) (Japanese ver.); 2. "Fanfare" (Japanese ver.); 3. "Roar" (Japanese ver.); 4. "Together" (Japanese ver.); 5. "Hide and Seek" (Japanese ver.); 6. "Easy Love" (Japanese ver.); 7. "Just On My Way" (Japanese ver.); 8. "Watch Out" (Japanese ver.); 9. "Blank." (空白) (Japanese ver.); 10. "Still My Lady" (Japanese ver.)	7	JPN: 22,914
Illuminate	Released: March 20, 2019; Label: Warner Music Japan; Formats: CD, digital download, streaming; Track listing: 1. "Enough" (Japanese ver.); 2. "Now or Never" (Japanese ver.); 3. "Unlimited" (Japanese ver.); 4. "Play Hard" (Japanese ver.); 5. "Photograph" (Japanese ver.); 6. Be My Baby" (Japanese ver.); 7. "Life Is So Beautiful" (Japanese ver.); 8. "The Beat Goes On" (Japanese ver.); 9. "Mamma Mia!" (マンマミーア！) (Japanese ver.); 10. "Dear Fantasy" (Japanese ver.)	3	JPN: 26,243
Golden Echo	Released: December 9, 2020 (JPN); Label: Warner Music Japan; Formats: CD, digital download, streaming; Track listing: 1. "Summer Breeze" (Japanese ver.); 2. "One Love" (Japanese ver.); 3. "Go High" (Japanese ver.); 4. "RPM" (Japanese ver.); 5. "My Story, My Song" (Japanese ver.); 6. "See U Tomorrow" (Japanese ver.); 7. "Good Guy" (Japanese ver.); 8. "Round and Round" (Japanese ver.); 9. "Like the Hands Held Tight" (Japanese ver.); 10. "Beautiful Light" (Japanese ver.)	11	JPN: 10,495

=== Compilation albums ===
List of compilation albums, showing selected details, selected chart positions, and sales figures
Title	Details	Peak chart positions	Sales
Title	Details	JPN	Sales
The Best: Dear Fantasy	Released: June 29, 2022 (JPN); Label: Warner Music Japan; Formats: CD, digital download, streaming	11	JPN: 5,634
ReStart SF9 Best Collection Vol. 2	Released: April 10, 2024 (JPN); Label: FNC Entertainment Japan; Formats: CD, digital download, streaming	3	JPN: 19,555

=== Single albums ===
List of single albums, showing selected details, selected chart positions, and sales figures
Title	Details	Peak chart positions	Sales
Title	Details	KOR	Sales
Feeling Sensation	Released: October 5, 2016; Label: FNC Entertainment; Formats: CD, digital download, streaming	6	KOR: 32,322
Special History Book	Released: October 5, 2020; Label: FNC Entertainment; Formats: CD, digital download, streaming; Track listing: 1. "Shine Together" (손잡아 줄게); 2. "Forever" (오래 오래); 3. "Love No. 5"	5	KOR: 45,087

== Extended plays ==
=== Korean extended plays ===
List of extended plays, with selected details, selected chart positions, and sales figures
Title	Details	Peak chart positions			Sales
Title	Details	KOR	JPN	US World	Sales
Burning Sensation	Released: February 6, 2017; Label: FNC Entertainment; Formats: CD, digital download, streaming	3	92	6	KOR: 36,095; JPN: 788
Breaking Sensation	Released: April 18, 2017; Label: FNC Entertainment; Formats: CD, digital download, streaming	5	106	5	KOR: 30,933; JPN: 853
Knights of the Sun	Released: October 12, 2017; Label: FNC Entertainment; Formats: CD, digital download, streaming	4	—	7	KOR: 35,912; JPN: 933
Mamma Mia!	Released: February 26, 2018; Label: FNC Entertainment; Formats: CD, digital download, streaming	3	—	10	KOR: 46,932; JPN: 2,190
Sensuous	Released: July 31, 2018; Label: FNC Entertainment; Formats: CD, digital download, streaming; Track listing: 1. "Now or Never" (질렀어); 2. "Different" (달라); 3. "Unlimited"; 4. "Photograph"; 5. "Shadow"	3	31	10	KOR: 42,977; JPN: 1,723
Narcissus	Released: February 20, 2019; Label: FNC Entertainment; Formats: CD, digital download, streaming; Track listing: 1. "Enough" (예뻐지지 마); 2. "Play Hard" (화끈하게); 3. "Heartbeat" (하필); 4. "Life Is So Beautiful"; 5. "Fall in Love"; 6. "The Beat Goes On" (무중력)	4	—	11	KOR: 53,290
RPM	Released: June 17, 2019; Label: FNC Entertainment; Formats: CD, digital download, streaming; Track listing: 1. "RPM"; 2. "Round and Round" (돌고 돌아); 3. "Dreamer"; 4. "Liar"; 5. "See U Tomorrow"; 6. "Echo"	5	45	15	KOR: 60,101; JPN: 1,353
9loryus	Released: July 6, 2020; Label: FNC Entertainment; Formats: CD, digital download, streaming; Track listing: 1. "Summer Breeze" (여름 향기가 날 춤추게 해); 2. "Into the Night" (별을 따라); 3. "OK Sign"; 4. "All Day All Night" (비켜); 5. "Go High" (미친 것처럼); 6. "My Story, My Song"	3	13	—	KOR: 125,487; JPN: 4,238
Turn Over	Released: July 5, 2021; Label: FNC Entertainment; Formats: CD, digital download, streaming; Track listing: 1. "Tear Drop"; 2. "Believer" (숨); 3. "Love Again" (한 번 더 사랑하자); 4. "Off My Mind" (하자 하자 이별 좀); 5. "Fanatic" (방방 뛰어); 6. "Hey Hi Bye"	2	12	—	KOR: 237,192; JPN: 4,537
Rumination	Released: November 22, 2021; Label: FNC Entertainment; Formats: CD, digital download, streaming; Track listing: 1. "Trauma"; 2. "Memory"; 3. "Dreams"; 4. "Gentleman"; 5. "On and On" (잠시); 6. "Scenario"; 7. "For Fantasy" (오늘이라서)	1	46	—	KOR: 199,921; JPN: 1,819
The Wave of9	Released: July 13, 2022; Label: FNC Entertainment; Formats: CD, digital download, streaming; Track listing: 1. "Scream"; 2. "OK OK"; 3. "Summertime Bounce (Don't Kill My Vibe)"; 4. "Driver"; 5. "Crazy Crazy Love"; 6. "Butterfly"	5	—	—	KOR: 179,779
The Piece of9	Released: January 9, 2023; Label: FNC Entertainment; Formats: CD, digital download, streaming; Track listing: 1. "Puzzle"; 2. "Love Colour"; 3. "New World"; 4. "Fighter"; 5. "Tight" (꽉); 6. "Stay with Me"	3	36	—	KOR: 108,464; JPN: 1,151
Sequence	Released: January 8, 2024; Label: FNC Entertainment; Formats: CD, digital download, streaming; Track listing: 1. "Bibora" (비보라); 2. "Midnight Sun"; 3. "Domino"; 4. "Strings"; 5. "Morning Coffee"; 6. "Superconductor"	2	36	—	KOR: 113,996; JPN: 994
Fantasy	Released: August 19, 2024; Label: FNC Entertainment; Formats: CD, digital download, streaming; Track listing: 1. "Don't Worry, Be Happy"; 2. "Cruel Love"; 3. "Just" (그냥); 4. "My Fantasia"; 5. "Melodrama"	3	—	—	KOR: 98,991
Love Race	Released: March 11, 2025; Label: FNC Entertainment; Formats: CD, digital download, streaming; Track listing: 1. "Love Race"; 2. "Suited"; 3. "Side by Side"; 4. "Waruru"; 5. "No No No"; 6. "Love Puzzle" (숨은 사랑 찾기)	9	7	—	KOR: 80,678; JPN: 12,633
About Love	Released: March 25, 2026; Label: FNC Entertainment; Formats: CD, digital download, streaming; Track listing: 1. "Love Comes Slowly"; 2. "Fade Into Memories"; 3. "You Think Too Much"; 4. "Last of Us"; 5. "Hurt & Hollow"; 6. "By Your Side"; 7. "Broken Way"	4	10	—	KOR: 50,733; JPN: 9,885
"—" denotes a recording that did not chart or was not released in that territory

=== Japanese extended plays ===
List of extended plays, with selected details, selected chart positions, and sales figures
Title	Details	Peak chart positions	Sales
Title	Details	JPN	Sales
D.W.B.H	Released: December 18, 2024; Label: Warner Music Japan; Formats: CD, digital download, streaming; Track listing: 1. "Don't Worry Be Happy" (Japanese version); 2. "Cruel Love" (with Jaeyoon); 3. "Just With" (with Jaeyoon); 4. "My Fantasia" (with Jaeyoon); 5. "Melodrama" (with Jaeyoon); 6. "Don't Worry Be Happy" (with Jaeyoon)	4	JPN: 16,489

== Singles ==
=== Korean singles ===
List of Korean singles, showing year released, selected chart positions, and album name
Title	Year	Peak chart positions			Album
Title	Year	KOR	KOR Hot	US World	Album
"Fanfare" (팡파레)	2016	—	—	—	Feeling Sensation
"So Beautiful" (너와 함께라면)	2016	—	—	—	Non-album single
"Roar" (부르릉)	2017	—	—	—	Burning Sensation
"Easy Love" (쉅다)	2017	—	93	—	Breaking Sensation
"O Sole Mio" (오솔레미오)	2017	—	—	7	Knights of the Sun
"Mamma Mia"	2018	—	—	—	Mamma Mia!
"Now or Never" (질렀어)	2018	—	—	14	Sensuous
"Enough" (예뻐지지 마)	2019	—	—	—	Narcissus
"RPM"	2019	— (Note: "RPM" did not enter the Gaon Digital Chart, but peaked at number 200 on the Download Chart.)	91	—	RPM
"Good Guy"	2020	104	76	—	First Collection
"Summer Breeze" (여름 향기가 날 춤추게 해)	2020	133	85	—	9loryUS
"Shine Together" (손잡아 줄게)	2020	— (Note: "Shine Together" did not enter the Gaon Digital Chart, but peaked at number 189 on the Download Chart.)	—	—	Special History Book
"Tear Drop"	2021	152	—	—	Turn Over
"Trauma"	2021	148	77	—	Rumination
"Savior" (Note: "Savior" was released as a promotional single in collaboration with Universe.)	2021	— (Note: "Savior" did not enter the Gaon Digital Chart, but peaked at number 128 on the Download Chart.)	—	—	Non-album single
"Scream"	2022	168	*	—	The Wave OF9
"Puzzle"	2023	118	*	—	The Piece OF9
"Bibora" (비보라)	2024	150	*	—	Sequence
"Don't Worry, Be Happy"	2024	— (Note: "Don't Worry, Be Happy" did not enter the Circle Digital Chart, but peaked at number 6, 12, and 74 on the Download Chart, the BGM Chart, and the V Coloring Chart, respectively.)	*	—	Fantasy
"Love Race"	2025	— (Note: "Love Race" did not enter the Circle Digital Chart, but peaked at number 21 on the Download Chart.)	*	—	Love Race
"Love Comes Slowly"	2026	— (Note: "Love Comes Slowly" did not enter the Circle Digital Chart, but peaked at number 89 on the component Download Chart.)	*	—	About Love
"Without Wings"	2026	— (Note: "Without Wings" did not enter the Circle Digital Chart, but peaked at number 14 on the component Download Chart.)	*	—	Tenacity
"—" denotes a recording that did not chart or was not released in that territory "*" denotes a chart did not exist at that time

=== Japanese singles ===
List of Japanese singles, showing year released, selected chart positions, sales figures, and album name
Title	Year	Peak chart positions		Sales	Album
Title	Year	JPN	JPN Hot	Sales	Album
"Fanfare"	2017	6	14	JPN: 23,589	Sensational Feeling Nine
"Easy Love"	2017	5	12	JPN: 25,023	Sensational Feeling Nine
"Mamma Mia"	2018	4	7	JPN: 50,444	Illuminate
"Now or Never"	2018	3	6	JPN: 45,532	Illuminate
"RPM"	2019	4	6	JPN: 48,176	Golden Echo
"Good Guy"	2020	2	13	JPN: 38,122	Golden Echo
"Don't Worry, Be Happy"	2024	—	—		D.W.B.H
"—" denotes a recording that did not chart or was not released in that territory

=== Chinese singles ===
List of Chinese singles, showing year released, and album name
Title	Year	Album
"Fanfare"	2016	Non-album singles
"Still My Lady"	2017	Non-album singles
"Easy Love"	2017	Non-album singles
"O Sole Mio"	2017	Non-album singles
"Mamma Mia"	2018	Non-album singles
"Now or Never"	2018	Non-album singles

== Other charted songs ==
List of other charted songs, showing year released, selected chart positions, and album name
Title	Year	Peak chart positions		Album
Title	Year	KOR Down.	KOR Hot	Album
"Watch Out"	2017	—	96	Breaking Sensation
"Believer" (숨)	2021	37	—	Kingdom <Final: Who Is the King?> and Turn Over
"Love Again" (한 번 더 사랑하자)	2021	107	—	Turn Over
"Off My Mind" (하자 하자 이별 좀)	2021	122	—	Turn Over
"Fanatic" (방방 뛰어)	2021	120	—	Turn Over
"Hey Hi Bye"	2021	114	—	Turn Over
"Memory"	2021	113	—	Rumination
"Dreams"	2021	139	—	Rumination
"Gentleman"	2021	141	—	Rumination
"On and On" (잠시)	2021	117	—	Rumination
"Scenario"	2021	130	—	Rumination
"For Fantasy" (오늘이라서)	2021	119	—	Rumination
"OK OK"	2022	116	*	The Wave OF9
"Summertime Bounce (Don't Kill My Vibe)"	2022	129	*	The Wave OF9
"Driver"	2022	125	*	The Wave OF9
"Crazy Crazy Love"	2022	128	*	The Wave OF9
"Butterfly"	2022	134	*	The Wave OF9
"Love Colour"	2023	70	*	The Piece OF9
"New World"	2023	76	*	The Piece OF9
"Fighter"	2023	75	*	The Piece OF9
"Tight" (꽉)	2023	74	*	The Piece OF9
"Stay with Me"	2023	73	*	The Piece OF9
"Midnight Sun"	2024	110	*	Sequence
"Domino"	2024	124	*	Sequence
"Strings"	2024	115	*	Sequence
"Morning Coffee"	2024	119	*	Sequence
"Superconductor"	2024	116	*	Sequence
"Cruel Love"	2024	116	*	Fantasy
"Just" (그냥)	2024	124	*	Fantasy
"My Fantasia"	2024	121	*	Fantasy
"Melodrama"	2024	120	*	Fantasy
"—" denotes a recording that did not chart or was not released in that territory "*" denotes a chart did not exist at that time

== Music videos ==
=== Korean music videos ===
List of Korean music videos
Year	Title	Director	Ref.
2016	"Fanfare"	Beomjin (VM Project Architecture)	
2016	"So Beautiful"	Unknown	—N/a
2017	"Roar"	Beomjin (VM Project Architecture)	
2017	"Easy Love"	Korlio (August Frogs)	
2017	"O Sole Mio"	Purple Straw Film	
2018	"Mamma Mia"	Purple Straw Film	
2018	"Now or Never"	Paranoid Paradigm (VM Project Architecture)	
2019	"Enough"	Hong Won-ki (Zanybros)	
2019	"RPM"	Daniel Jon (Team Daniel)	
2020	"Good Guy"	Digipedi	
2020	"Summer Breeze"	Digipedi	
2021	"Tear Drop"	Digipedi	
2021	"Trauma"	Purple Straw Film	
2022	"Scream"	Hattrick	
2023	"Puzzle"	Flipevil	
2024	"Bibora"	Minjun Lee, Hayoung Lee (MOSWANTD)	

=== Japanese music videos ===
List of Japanese music videos
Year	Title	Director
2017	"Fanfare"	Unknown
2017	"Roar"	Unknown
2017	"Easy Love"	Unknown
2017	"O Sole Mio" (Short ver.)	Unknown
2017	"O Sole Mio"	Unknown
2018	"Mamma Mia"	Unknown
2018	"Now or Never"	Unknown
2019	"Enough"	Unknown
2019	"RPM"	Unknown
