= Kim Youngbin =

South Korean singer (born 1993)

Youngbin
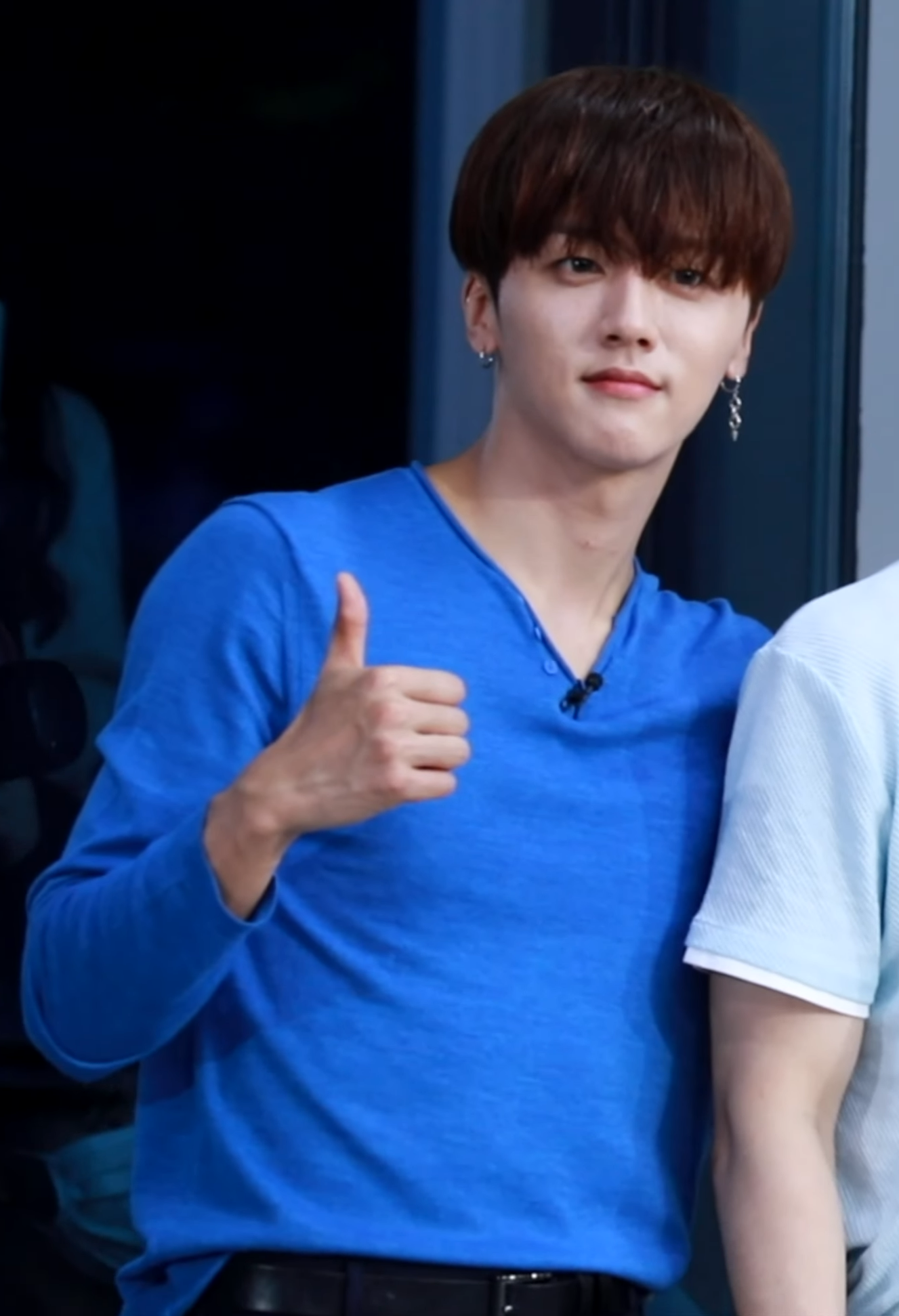
- Youngbin in 2019
- Born: Kim Young-bin; November 23, 1993 (age 32); Anyang, South Korea
- Occupations: Singer; rapper; dancer; actor
- Years active: 2016–present
- Height: 178 cm (5 ft 10 in)
- Musical career
- Genre: K-pop
- Label: FNC
- Member of: SF9

Korean name
- Hangul: 김영빈
- RR: Gim Yeongbin
- MR: Kim Yŏngbin

Kim Young-bin (Korean: 김영빈; born November 23, 1993), also known mononymously as Youngbin, is a South Korean singer, rapper, dancer and actor. He is the leader of the South Korean boy band SF9.

As an actor, he began his career as a supporting role in the interactive web drama Click Your Heart (2016), later played a main character in the drama Bubble Up (2022).

== Career ==
=== 2015-2016: Debut with SF9 ===
In 2015, he was a part of a pre-debut team, "Neoz School", under FNC Entertainment as a member of the group called Neoz. In May 2016, he participated as a member of "Neoz Dance" in FNC Entertainment's survival show d.o.b : Dance or Band, competing against Neoz Band (later known as Honeyst). "Neoz Dance" won the competition with 51% of the votes and received the opportunity to debut. He debuted with group SF9 on October 5, 2016, with their debut album Feeling Sensation, featuring their first single "Fanfare".

=== 2016–2021: Continued group activities and solo endeavors ===
Following his debut with SF9 in 2016, Youngbin participated actively in the group's music production and performances. He contributed to lyrics and composition for several SF9 tracks, including "Intro" from Breaking Sensation (2017), "Poetry; 0:00" from Knights of the Sun (2017), and others in albums such as Mamma Mia! (2018), Sensuous (2018), Narcissus (2019), and First Collection (2020).

In 2020, Youngbin made a cameo appearance in the JTBC drama Was It Love? and later took on his first acting lead role in the 2022 web drama Bubble Up, portraying the character Kim Se-woon.

On December 29, 2020, he launched his personal Instagram account (@yb_dkxh), becoming the fifth SF9 member to do so.

=== 2022–2023: Military service ===
On February 14, 2022, FNC Entertainment announced that Youngbin would enlist for his mandatory military service. He began serving as an active-duty soldier on March 29, 2022, and was assigned to the 27th Infantry Division. He was discharged on September 28, 2023.

=== 2024–present: Return and fan events ===
After completing his military service, Youngbin resumed group activities with SF9. On January 8, 2024, SF9 released their thirteenth extended play, Sequence, with the title track "Bibora". This comeback marked the group's first album after Rowoon's departure.

To commemorate his birthday, Youngbin held his first solo fan meeting titled Bohemian on November 23, 2024, at the Baekam Art Hall in Seoul. The event sold out within one minute of ticket release, signaling his strong popularity and continued support from fans.

== Personal life ==
On March 29, 2022, Youngbin began his mandatory military service. He completed his service on September 28, 2023.

== Discography ==
=== Singles ===
Song	Year	Album
"On and On" (With Inseong)	2021	Rumination

== Filmography ==
=== Television series ===
Year	Title	Role	Notes	Ref.
2020	Was It Love?	Youngbin	SF9 cameo (Ep.6)	

=== Web series ===
Year	Title	Role	Notes	Ref.
2016	Click Your Heart	Youngbin	SF9 debut drama	
2022	Bubble Up!	Kim Se-woon	Main role	
