= The Piece of9 =

EP by SF9
- Released: January 9, 2023
- Genre: K-pop
- Length: 21:01
- Language: Korean; English
- Label: FNC Entertainment

SF9 chronology
The Wave of9 (2022)	The Piece of9 (2023)	Sequence (2024)

The Piece of9 is the twelfth extended play (EP) by South Korean boy band SF9. It was released on January 9, 2023, by FNC Entertainment. The album consists of six tracks, including the title track, "Puzzle".

== Background ==
"Puzzle" is an R&B pop tune with heavy bass and an addictive hook that accentuates the vocals of the act. It sings of fitting the pieces of a puzzle together to find out the truth about a tragic ending.

It feels good to be back with my group members. I feel at home and we are very satisfied with how this album turned out. I am excited to see what our fans will think about it.

— Rowoon talks about the album.

I took part in composing our lead track and I tried to incorporate the unique musical flavors of each of our members.

— Zuho talks about composing.

== Commercial performance ==
The EP sold 108,464+ copies in South Korea. It peaked at number 3 on the Korean Gaon Chart.

== Track listing ==
No.	Title	Lyrics	Music	Length
1.	"Puzzle"	Han Seong-ho; Sooyoon; Zuho; Hwiyoung	Zuho; Sebastian Thott; Benjmn	3:37
2.	"Love Colour"	Han Seong-ho; Sooyoon; Zuho; Hwiyoung	SlyBerry; Rapid; kyler Niko	3:17
3.	"New World"	Han Sung-ho; Sooyoon; Zuho; Hwiyoung; Chani	Park Soo-seok; Seo Ji-eun; Moon Kim; Andy Love; Lee Tae-hyun	3:51
4.	"Fighter"	Han Sung-ho; Sooyoon; Zuho; Hwiyoung	Park Soo-seok; Seo Ji-eun; Moon Kim; SQVARE	3:28
5.	"꽉" (Tight)	Han Sung-ho; Sooyoon; Zuho	Park Soo-seok; Seo Ji-eun; Kyler Niko; Lee Tae-hyun	3:05
6.	"Stay with me"	Jaeyoon	Jaeyoon; Jeong Jin-Wook; SlyBerry	3:43
Total length:				21:01
