= Lee Dawon =

South Korean singer (born 1995)

Dawon
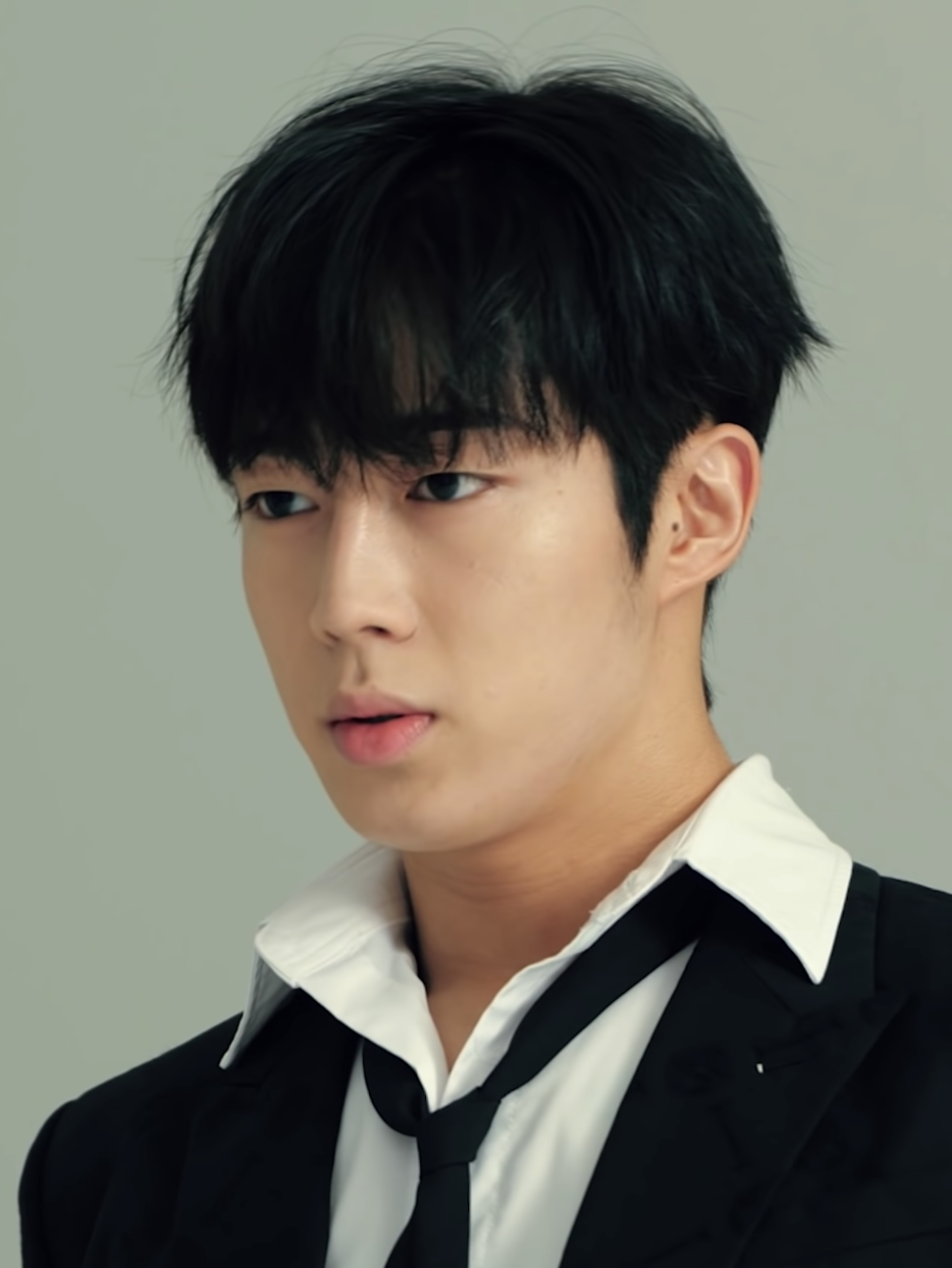
- Dawon in 2021
- Born: Lee Sang-hyuk; July 24, 1995 (age 31); Gyeonggi, South Korea
- Occupations: Dancer; singer; actor
- Years active: 2016–present
- Height: 179 cm (5 ft 10 in)
- Musical career
- Genre: K-pop
- Label: FNC
- Member of: SF9

Korean name
- Hangul: 이상혁
- Hanja: 李相赫
- RR: I Sanghyeok
- MR: I Sanghyŏk

Stage name
- Hangul: 다원
- RR: Dawon
- MR: Tawŏn

Lee Sang-hyuk (Korean: 이상혁; born July 24, 1995), also known by his stage name Dawon (다원), is a South Korean singer, dancer and actor. He is a member of the South Korean group SF9 as a lead dancer and sub vocalist. As an actor, he is best known for his supporting role as Dong-kyung's brother in Doom at Your Service (2021).

Dawon trained to be a k-pop idol and performer in the talent company FNC Entertainment's rookie training program Neoz School. In 2016, he competed in the nine-member dance group NEOZ Dance on the Mnet survival reality show d.o.b.: Dance or Band, where he and his groupmates competed for a chance to debut as FNC's first boy dance group. They won the competition, and debuted as FNC's first male dance group with the group name SF9 (short for Sensational Feeling 9). They released their first single "Fanfare" on October 5, 2016.

As an actor, Dawon began his career as a supporting role in the interactive web drama Click Your Heart (2016), later played a support character in the drama Doom at Your Service (2021) and Curtain Call (2022), and web drama My 20th Twenty (2023).

== Career ==
=== 2015-2016: Debut with SF9 ===
In 2015, he was a part of a pre-debut team, "Neoz School", under FNC Entertainment as a member of the group called NEOZ. In May 2016, he participated as a member of "NEOZ Dance" in FNC Entertainment's survival show d.o.b : Dance or Band, competing against NEOZ Band (later known as Honeyst). "NEOZ Dance" won the competition with 51% of the votes and received the opportunity to debut. He debuted with group SF9 on October 5, 2016, with their debut album Feeling Sensation, featuring their first single "Fanfare".

== Personal life ==
=== Philanthropy ===
On January 5, 2023, Dawon saved a patient who had a cardiac arrest while bathing in a sauna. He did his best to provide first aid and then took the patient to 119.

=== Military service ===
On July 1, 2024, FNC announced that Lee will enter mandatory military service.

== Discography ==
=== Singles ===
Title	Year	Album	Ref.
"Your Scent"	2023	My 20th Twenty OST	
"Question Mark" (with Zuho and Jaeyoon)	2023	Starstruck OST	
"Shooting Star"	2023		

== Filmography ==
=== Film ===
Year	Title	Role	Notes	Ref.
2023	Secret	Donggeun	Support role	

=== Television series ===
Year	Title	Role	Notes	Ref.
2020	Was It Love?	Dawon	SF9 cameo (Ep.6)	
2021	Doom at Your Service	Tak Sun-kyung	Support role	
2022	Curtain Call	Jung Sangchul young	Cameo (Ep.11,14)	

=== Web series ===
Year	Title	Role	Notes	Ref.
2016	Click Your Heart	Dawon	SF9 debut drama	
2018	Dingo K-Drama	Dawon	Main role	
2021	Part-time Melo	Ki Seon-ho	Main role	
2023	My 20th Twenty	Cho Sang-wook	Main role	

=== Music video appearances ===
Year	Title	Artist	Notes
2016	"I'm Jelly Baby"	AOA Cream	Appearance
