= Sequence (EP) =

EP by SF9
- Released: January 8, 2024
- Genre: K-pop
- Length: 16:54
- Language: Korean; English
- Label: FNC Entertainment

SF9 chronology
The Piece of9 (2023)	Sequence (2024)	Fantasy (2024)

Sequence is the thirteenth extended play (EP) by South Korean boy band SF9. It was released on January 8, 2024, by FNC Entertainment. The album consists of six tracks, including the title track, "Bibora".

== Background ==
The mini album comes about a year since its last, “The Piece of 9,” and will feature all members except Jaeyoon who is yet to be discharged from his mandatory military duty. Youngbin and Inseong have returned after completing theirs. The upcoming album is the first the band is releasing after Rowoon left and reorganized into an eight-piece act. All bandmates—including Rowoon—renewed their contracts with the agency, but Rowoon decided to exit the group to focus on his acting career. SF9 celebrated its seventh anniversary in October with a livestream and a fan concert in Seoul.

== Commercial performance ==
The EP sold 113,996+ copies in South Korea. It peaked at number 2 on the Korean Gaon Chart.

== Track listing ==
Below is the track listing.

No.	Title	Lyrics	Music	Length
1.	"비보라 (Bibora)"	Han Sung-ho; Sooyoon; Youngbin; Zuho; Hwiyoung	Han Sung-ho; Park Soo-seok; Seo Ji-eun; Bong Won-seok; Jacob Aaron (THE HUB)	3:15
2.	"Midnight Sun"	Han Sung-ho; Sooyoon; Zuho	Han Sung-ho; Sooyoon; Zuho	3:32
3.	"Domino"	Han Sung-ho; Sooyoon; Youngbin; Zuho	Han Sung-ho; Park Soo-seok; Seo Ji-eun; Patrick ‘J.Que’ Smith; Didrik Thott	3:05
4.	"Strings"	Han Sung-ho; Sooyoon; Youngbin; Zuho; Hwiyoung	Han Sung-ho; Park Soo-seok; Lee Tae-hyun; Benjmn	3:33
5.	"Morning Coffee"	Han Seong-ho; Sooyoon; Youngbin; Zuho; Hwiyoung	Sebastian Thott; Patrick ‘J.Que’ Smith	3:41
6.	"Superconductor"	Sooyoon; Dawon	SlyBerry; Rapid; Jacob Aaron (THE HUB); Dawon	2:48
Total length:				16:54
