= Fantasy (SF9 EP) =

- Digital cover

EP by SF9
- Released: August 19, 2024
- Genre: K-pop
- Length: 16:02
- Language: Korean; English
- Label: FNC Entertainment

SF9 chronology
Sequence (2024)	Fantasy (2024)	Love Race (2025)

Fantasy (Fandom name) is the fourteenth extended play (EP) by South Korean boy band SF9. It was released on August 19, 2024, by FNC Entertainment. The album consists of five tracks, including the title track, "Don't Worry, Be Happy".

== Background ==
Inseong thanked Jaeyoon as well, crediting him for boosting everyone’s energy to have a laugh while practicing for the comeback.

We are happy to show a new side to fans and expectations are higher since Jaeyoon is back with us after almost three years.

— Leader Youngbin talks about the album.

== Commercial performance ==
The EP sold 98,991+ copies in South Korea. It peaked at number 3 on the Korean Gaon Chart.

== Track listing ==
No.	Title	Lyrics	Music	Length
1.	"Don't Worry, Be Happy"	Han Sung-ho; Sooyoon; Youngbin; Hwiyoung	Han Sung-ho; Park Soo-seok; Jeong Jin-wook; Lee Tae-hyun; Jacob Aaron (THE HUB)	3:34
2.	"Cruel Love"	Han Seong-ho; Youngbin; Hwiyoung; Chani	Han Seong-ho; SlyBerry; DJ KAYVON; Moon Kim (Room 01); PIT300 (BADX)	2:42
3.	"그냥 (Just)"	Han Seong-ho; Youngbin; Hwiyoung	Han Seong-ho; Park Soo-seok; Bong Won-seok; Moon Kim (Room 01)	3:17
4.	"My Fantasia"	Han Seong-ho; Sooyoon; Youngbin; Hwiyoung	Han Seong-ho; SlyBerry; Rapid; Jacob Aaron (THE HUB)	3:15
5.	"Melodrama"	Yoo Taeyang; Youngbin; Hwiyoung	Yoo Taeyang, Jeong Jinwook	3:09
Total length:				16:02
