= Revolutions per Minute =

Revolutions per minute is a unit of frequency, commonly used to measure rotational speed.

Revolutions per Minute may refer to:

- Revolutions per Minute (Rise Against album), a 2003 album by Rise Against
- Revolutions per Minute (Reflection Eternal album), a 2010 album by Reflection Eternal
- Revolutions per Minute (Skid Row album), a 2006 album by Skid Row

== See also ==
- RPM (disambiguation)
