= RPM (disambiguation) =

RPM, or revolutions per minute, is a unit of rotational speed.

RPM or rpm may also refer to:

== Science and technology ==
- Radiation portal monitor, a detector to screen against threats
- Random positioning machine, simulating microgravity
- Raven's Progressive Matrices, a cognitive test
- Rapid plant movement, short period movement of plants
- Rendezvous pitch maneuver, by a space shuttle
- RPM-30-2-Can Do: Respiration, Pulse (or Perfusion), and Mental status, in START triage
- Rounds per minute, of a firearm

=== Computing ===
- Ranish Partition Manager, software
- RPM Package Manager, Linux software

=== Medicine and psychology ===
- Remote patient monitoring
- Reasonable person model

== Organizations ==
- RPM International, a chemical sealant company
- RPM (magazine), a former Canadian music magazine
- RPM Mortgage, mortgage banking, United States
- RPM Records (UK)
- RPM Records (United States)
- Radio Programas de México, Mexican radio company
- Rally for Mali (Rassemblement pour le Mali), a political party in Mali
- Rally for the Fatherland and Modernity, a political party in Gabon
- RP Motorsport, an Italian auto racing team
- Race Performance Motorsport, an Italian auto racing team
- Richard Petty Motorsports, an American former auto racing team

== Film and television ==
- Power Rangers RPM, a TV series
- R. P. M., a 1971 film
- RPM (Cars), a character
- RPM (film), 1997
- RPM (TV series)
- "RPM" (The Batman), a TV episode

== Music ==
- RPM (American band)
- RPM (Brazilian band)
- RPM (EP), a 2019 EP by SF9
- "RPM" (Sugar Ray song), in 1997 album Floored
- "RPM" (Sasha Pieterse song), 2013
- "RPM" (Boney James song), from album Ride
- "RPM" (SF9 song), 2019
- Revolutions per Minute (Rise Against album)
- Rock Productions Music, a Christian band

== Other uses ==
- Resale price maintenance, an anti-competitive practice
- RPM (nightclub), a former nightclub in Toronto, Canada
- RPM (wrestler), an American professional wrestler
- RPM (horse), a Tennessee Walking Horse
- Rapid prompting method, a pseudoscientific communication technique
- Revenue passenger mile, a measure of passenger traffic
- Red and Purple Modernization Project, a rapid transit project in Illinois, United States
- Ngukurr Airport, an IATA airport code
