= Love Race (EP) =

- Digital cover

EP by SF9
- Released: March 11, 2025
- Genre: K-pop
- Length: 18:14
- Language: Korean; English
- Label: FNC Entertainment

SF9 chronology
Fantasy (2024)	Love Race (2025)

Love Race is the fifteenth extended play (EP) by South Korean boy band SF9. It was released on March 11, 2025, by FNC Entertainment. The album consists of six tracks, including the title track, "Love Race".

== Background ==
The mini album comes about seven months after the group's previous EP “Fantasy” and will be the second installment in the “Your Fantasy” series. The upcoming album will feature seven members of the octet, however, as Dawon started his mandatory military service last year. The 14th EP featured only five members, with Jaeyoon and Dawon enlisted and Juho unable to work out schedule conflicts due to him being with a different agency.

== Commercial performance ==
The EP sold 74,406+ copies in South Korea. It peaked at number 9 on the Korean Gaon Chart.

== Track listing ==
Love Race track listing
No.	Title	Lyrics	Music	Arrangement	Length
1.	"Love Race"	Han Sung-ho; Youngbin; Hwiyoung	Han S.; Park Soo-seok; Seo Ji-eun; Jacob Aaron (The Hub); Awrii (The Hub); Noerio (The Hub)	Park; Seo	2:58
2.	"Suited"	Han S.; Youngbin; Hwiyoung	Han S.; Park; Seo; Patrick 'J.Que' Smith; Benjmn	Park; Seo	3:04
3.	"Side by Side"	Han S.; Youngbin; Hwiyoung; Chani	Han S.; SlyBerry; Han Gyeong-jin; Smith; Aaron	SlyBerry; Han G.	3:14
4.	"Waruru"	Han S.; Youngbin	Han S.; Nathan Cunningham; Marc Sibley; Jesse Saint John; Anthony Watts	Space Primates	3:11
5.	"No No No"	Han S.; Youngbin; Hwiyoung	Jung Yong-hwa; Park; Taey (Logos); Noerio	Park; Taey	2:56
6.	"Love Puzzle" (숨은 사랑 찾기)	Han S.; Youngbin; Hwiyoung	Han S.; Park; Jeong Jin-wook; Noerio	Park; Jeong	3:31
Total length:					18:14

== Charts ==
=== Weekly charts ===
Weekly chart performance for Love Race
Chart (2025)	Peak position
Japanese Albums (Oricon)	7
Japanese Combined Albums (Oricon)	7
Japanese Hot Albums (Billboard Japan)	69
South Korean Albums (Circle)	9

=== Monthly charts ===
Monthly chart performance for Love Race
Chart (2025)	Position
Japanese Albums (Oricon)	18
South Korean Albums (Circle)	20
