= The Murky Stream =

2025 South Korean television series

- Promotional poster
- Hangul: 탁류
- RR: Tangnyu
- MR: T'angnyu
- Genre: Historical drama
- Written by: Chun Sung-il
- Directed by: Choo Chang-min
- Starring: Rowoon; Shin Ye-eun; Park Seo-ham
- Music by: Shin Hyun-sik; Jeong Song-hee
- Country of origin: South Korea
- Original language: Korean
- No. of episodes: 9

Production
- Running time: 50—60 minutes
- Production companies: NPIO Entertainment; Anew

Original release
- Network: Disney+
- Release: September 26 – October 17, 2025

The Murky Stream (Korean: 탁류) is a 2025 South Korean historical drama television series starring Rowoon, Shin Ye-eun, and Park Seo-ham. It is a story about the fates of three people: Si-yool, who hides his past and becomes a gangster, Choi Eun, who is smart and righteous, and Jeong-cheon, who dreams of becoming an honest government official. The first two episodes of the series premiered at the 30th Busan International Film Festival in the 'On Screen' section on September 18, 2025. Following its festival premiere, the series is available to stream on Disney+ starting with 3 episodes on September 26, 2025, and then two episodes every week for a total of 9 episodes.

== Synopsis ==
The Murky Stream depicts the story of the destinies of three people in the corrupt Joseon Dynasty in 1592 CE, where the once blue Gyeonggang River has turned into a turbid stream.

== Cast and characters ==
=== Main ===
- Rowoon as Jang Si-yool

A gangster of Mapo Ferry. He is a troublemaker in Mapo Ferry on the Han River, the center of Joseon's logistics and economy, and becomes a legend in Joseon with his body.

- Shin Ye-eun as Choi Eun

A merchant who leads the best merchant group in Joseon.

- Park Seo-ham as Jeong-cheon

An official of the Police Station who punishes corruption.

- Park Ji-hwan as Mudeok

A gangster who maintains order in Mapo Naru

- Jeon Bae-soo as Kang Haeng-soo, in charge of the finances of the Choi family and right-hand man of Choi Eun

=== Supporting ===
- Choi Gwi-hwa as Lee Dol-Gae
- Woo Ji-hyun as Bang

== Production ==
=== Development ===
The Murky Stream is a historical drama directed by Choo Chang-min, who mobilized 12.32 million viewers with the film Masquerade (2012), and written by Chun Sung-il, who previously wrote The Pirates (2014 film). It was produced by NPIO Entertainment and Anew.

=== Casting ===
According to Xports News on June 28, 2023, Rowoon is being considered as a lead role for the series. On July 19, a report came out that Park Seo-ham would be appearing.

PIO Entertainment told Newsen on February 20, 2024, regarding Shin Ye-eun appearance in the series, stating that she is "positively reviewing it." While Hankook Ilbo on the same day reported, Shin had confirmed her appearance. According to SPOTV News interview on March 6, Park Ji-hwan will be joining. On April 12, Lucky Monster Entertainment stated that Kim Dong-won is positively considering appearing. On May 6, Choi Gwi-hwa had been cast as stated by Star News. Ahn Seung-gyun is reported on July 25, that he will make his comeback acting in the series after two years. It was reported by SPOTV News on November 21, that Rowoon, Shin, Park Seo-ham, and Park Ji-hwan will appear.

=== Filming ===
Principal photography began in early May 2024.

== Release ==
Disney+ unveiled on its upcoming Korean slate on November 20, 2024, that included The Murky Stream, which was released on September 26, 2025 with 3 episodes.

The 2 episodes of the series premiered at the 30th Busan International Film Festival in the 'On Screen' section on September 18, 2025.
