= Doom at Your Service =

2021 South Korean television series

- Promotional poster
- Also known as: Doom
- Hangul: 어느 날 우리 집 현관으로 멸망이 들어왔다
- Lit.: One Day Destruction Entered the Front Door of My House
- RR: Eoneu nal uri jip hyeongwaneuro myeolmangi deureowatda
- MR: Ŏnŭ nal uri chip hyŏn'gwanŭro myŏlmangi tŭrŏwatta
- Genre: Fantasy; Romance
- Created by: tvN
- Written by: Im Me-a-ri
- Directed by: Kwon Young-il
- Starring: Park Bo-young; Seo In-guk
- Composer: Lim Ha-young
- Country of origin: South Korea
- Original language: Korean
- No. of episodes: 16

Production
- Executive producer: Jang Jeong-do
- Producers: Kim Woo-taek; Jang Kyung-ik
- Running time: 60 minutes
- Production companies: Studio&NEW; Studio Dragon

Original release
- Network: tvN
- Release: May 10 – June 29, 2021

Doom at Your Service (Korean: 어느 날 우리 집 현관으로 멸망이 들어왔다) is a 2021 South Korean television series starring Park Bo-young and Seo In-guk. It aired on tvN from May 10 to June 29, 2021.

== Synopsis ==
Tak Dong-kyung lives an ordinary life, working as an editor for an awful boss at a web novel publishing firm. On the anniversary of her parents' death, she learns that she will die from a glioblastoma in three months, her boyfriend was actually married with a pregnant wife, her younger brother is once again irresponsible, and has to deal with a pervert on the subway.

Deciding to drown her sorrows in soju, she happens to see a shooting star from her rooftop apartment and drunkenly wishes for the world to be doomed. Her atypical wish is heard by Myul Mang, a messenger between gods and humans. He was born between dark and light: when he breathes, countries disappear; when he walks, the seasons collapse; when he smiles, a life is extinguished. All he has to do is exist for something to fall into ruin. This is not his intention but simply his fate. On his birthday, he gets to choose a human's wish to fulfill. Sick of his fate, he chooses to fulfill Dong-kyung's wish to end the world.

Dong-kyung ends up signing a hundred-day contract with Myul Mang, risking everything she has ever known.

== Cast ==
=== Main ===
- Park Bo-young as Tak Dong-kyung

A web novel editor for six years at a publishing company called Life Story. She has been working hard ever since her parents died due to an accident.

- Seo In-guk as Myeolmang / Kim Sa-ram (Note: In Korean, Myeolmang (멸망; Myeolmang) and Saram (사람) literally mean Doom and Human, respectively.)

A messenger between gods and humans who only follows fate without any intention nor passion. Growing tired of his immortal life of bringing misfortune and destruction, he decides to end the world and thus bring doom upon himself.

- Lee Soo-hyuk as Cha Joo-ik

Dong-kyung's colleague who is the editorial team's leader.

- Kang Tae-oh as Lee Hyun-kyu

Joo-ik's roommate who is a café owner.

- Shin Do-hyun as Na Ji-na / Lee Hyun (pen name)

Dong-kyung's best friend who is a web novelist.

=== Supporting ===
Dong-kyung's family

- Dawon as Tak Sun-kyung

Dong-kyung's younger brother.

- Woo Hee-jin as Kang Soo-ja

Dong-kyung and Sun-kyung's aunt.

People at Life Story

- Song Jin-woo as Park Chang-shin

The CEO of Life Story.

- Song Joo-hee as Jo Ye-ji

Dong-kyung's friend who is an editor at Life Story.

- Choi So-yoon as Kim Da-in / Shanghai Park (pen name)

Dong-kyung's colleague.

- Park Tae-in as Park Jung-min

A new employee of Life Story's editorial team. Dating Da-in.

- Lee Seung-joon as Jung Seung-joon / Jung Dang-myeon (pen name)

A neurosurgeon and also a web novelist.

- Heo Jae-ho as Jijo King (pen name)

A web novelist.

- Nam Da-reum as Park Young / Gwi Gong-ja "Young Prince" (pen name)

A star writer of Life Story who is actually a high school student.

- Oh Yeon-ah as Dalgona (pen name)

A web novelist. Who is a fan of Park Young and has cancer as well.

- Son Woo-hyeon as Siberia (pen name)

A web novelist. Whose grandfather passed away.

Other

- Jung Ji-so as So Nyeon-sin the goddess

=== Special appearances ===
- Kim Ji-seok as Jo Dae-han (eps. 2–3)

Dong-kyung's ex-boyfriend.

- Han Ye-ri as a patient (eps. 3, 6)
- Kwon Soo-hyun as Dong-kyung's blind date and Ye-ji's friend (ep. 6)
- Daniel C. Kennedy as Kevin

Dong-kyung's uncle and Soo-ja's husband.

== Original soundtrack ==
Doom at Your Service OST

Soundtrack album by Various artists
- Released: June 29, 2021
- Genres: Soundtrack; Ballad
- Languages: Korean; English
- Labels: Music&NEW; Studio&NEW

No.	Title	Artist	Length
1.	"Breaking Down"	Ailee	3:43
2.	"Love Sight" (널 보면 시간이 멈춰 어느 순간에도)	Tomorrow X Together	4:12
3.	"U"	Baekhyun	3:44
4.	"I Wanna Be with You"	Gummy	4:07
5.	"All of My Love"	Davichi	4:18
6.	"This Is Love"	Sondia	3:55
7.	"Distant Fate" (아득한 먼 훗날 우리가)	Seo In-guk	4:03
8.	"Breaking Down" (Inst.)	Ailee	3:43
9.	"Love Sight" (Inst.)	Tomorrow X Together	4:12
10.	"U" (Inst.)	Baekhyun	3:43
11.	"I Wanna Be with You" (Inst.)	Gummy	4:07
12.	"All of My Love" (Inst.)	Davichi	4:18
13.	"This Is Love" (Inst.)	Sondia	3:55
14.	"Distant Fate" (Inst.)	Seo In-guk	4:03
15.	"Opening Title" (오프닝 타이틀)	Byun Dong-wook	1:00
16.	"Doom" (멸망)	Shin Min-yong	2:12
17.	"The Other Side of Life" (삶의 이면)	Yoo Jong-hyun	2:24
18.	"First Greeting" (첫인사)	Jin Myeong-yong	1:46
19.	"Unusual Person" (엉뚱한 그대)	Yoo Jong-hyun	1:54
20.	"Destiny to Love" (사랑할 운명)	Daniel Lee	3:33
21.	"At the End of Life" (인생의 끝에서)	Im Ha-yeong	3:27
22.	"Eternity" (영원)	Jin Myeong-yong	3:00

=== Part 1 ===
Released on May 17, 2021
No.	Title	Lyrics	Music	Artist	Length
1.	"Breaking Down"	Kim Chang-rak; Kim Soo-bin (Aiming); Atone	Kim Chang-rak; Kim Soo-bin (Aiming); Atone	Ailee	3:43
2.	"Breaking Down" (Inst.)		Kim Chang-rak; Kim Soo-bin (Aiming); Atone		3:43
Total length:					7:26

=== Part 2 ===
Released on May 24, 2021
No.	Title	Lyrics	Music	Artist	Length
1.	"Love Sight" (널 보면 시간이 멈춰 어느 순간에도)	AVGS; Jymon	AVGS; Jymon	Tomorrow X Together	4:12
2.	"Love Sight" (Inst.)		AVGS; Jymon		4:12
Total length:					8:24

=== Part 3 ===
Released on May 31, 2021
No.	Title	Lyrics	Music	Artist	Length
1.	"U"	Kim Chang-rak; Kim Soo-bin (Aiming); Hwang Seo-young	Kim Chang-rak; Kim Soo-bin (Aiming); No Young-won; Kwon Soo-hyun	Baekhyun	3:44
2.	"U" (Inst.)		Kim Chang-rak; Kim Soo-bin (Aiming); No Young-won; Kwon Soo-hyun		3:43
Total length:					7:27

=== Part 4 ===
Released on June 7, 2021
No.	Title	Lyrics	Music	Artist	Length
1.	"I Wanna Be with You"	Yoon Kyung-won; Hwang Seo-young; Hwang Eun-jung	Kim Chang-rak; Kim Soo-bin (Aiming); Choi Jae-young	Gummy	4:07
2.	"I Wanna Be with You" (Inst.)		Kim Chang-rak; Kim Soo-bin (Aiming); Choi Jae-young		4:07
Total length:					8:14

=== Part 5 ===
Released on June 14, 2021
No.	Title	Lyrics	Music	Artist	Length
1.	"All of My Love"	Davichi	Kim Chang-rak; Kim Soo-bin (Aiming); Jo Se-hee	Davichi	4:18
2.	"All of My Love" (Inst.)		Kim Chang-rak; Kim Soo-bin (Aiming); Jo Se-hee		4:18
Total length:					8:36

=== Part 6 ===
Released on June 21, 2021
No.	Title	Lyrics	Music	Artist	Length
1.	"This Is Love"	Song Yang-ha; Kim Jae-hyun; Lee Joo-ah	Song Yang-ha; Kim Jae-hyun	Sondia	3:55
2.	"This Is Love" (Inst.)		Song Yang-ha; Kim Jae-hyun		3:55
Total length:					7:50

=== Part 7 ===
Released on June 22, 2021
No.	Title	Lyrics	Music	Artist	Length
1.	"Distant Fate" (아득한 먼 훗날 우리가)	Kim Eana; Seo In-guk	Seo In-guk; Park Kyung-hyun	Seo In-guk	4:03
2.	"Distant Fate" (Inst.)		Seo In-guk; Park Kyung-hyun		4:03
Total length:					8:06

== Viewership ==
Doom at Your Service : South Korea viewers per episode (thousands)

Season	Episode number																Average
Season	1	2	3	4	5	6	7	8	9	10	11	12	13	14	15	16	Average
1	933	1003	951	765	732	938	844	692	690	662	673	552	773	658	543	586	749

Source: Audience measurement performed nationwide by Nielsen Korea

Average TV viewership ratings
Ep.	Original broadcast date	Average audience share (Nielsen Korea)	
Ep.	Original broadcast date	Nationwide	Seoul
1	May 10, 2021	4.118% (1st)	4.238% (1st)
2	May 11, 2021	4.422% (1st)	4.926% (1st)
3	May 17, 2021	3.952% (1st)	4.521% (1st)
4	May 18, 2021	3.194% (1st)	3.390% (1st)
5	May 24, 2021	3.384% (1st)	3.863% (1st)
6	May 25, 2021	3.343% (1st)	4.066% (1st)
7	May 31, 2021	3.297% (1st)	3.702% (1st)
8	June 1, 2021	2.789% (1st)	3.371% (1st)
9	June 7, 2021	2.505% (1st)	2.922% (1st)
10	June 8, 2021	2.473% (2nd)	2.714% (2nd)
11	June 14, 2021	2.517% (1st)	2.894% (1st)
12	June 15, 2021	2.351% (2nd)	2.318% (2nd)
13	June 21, 2021	2.899% (1st)	3.511% (1st)
14	June 22, 2021	2.521% (2nd)	2.947% (1st)
15	June 28, 2021	2.334% (1st)	2.865% (1st)
16	June 29, 2021	2.340% (2nd)	2.630% (2nd)
Average		3.027%	3.430%
In the table above, the blue numbers represent the lowest ratings and the red numbers represent the highest ratings.; This series aired on a cable channel/pay TV which normally has a relatively smaller audience compared to free-to-air TV/public broadcasters (KBS, SBS, MBC and EBS).

== International broadcast ==
The series was pre-sold to 150 countries. It is available for streaming on various platforms such as Viki, Viu, U-Next in Japan, iQIYI in Taiwan, and Now TV in Hong Kong. It also aired on Mnet Japan from October 23, 2021.

== Listicle ==
Name of publisher, year listed, name of listicle, and placement
Publisher	Year	Listicle	Placement	Ref.
NME	2021	The 10 best Korean dramas of 2021	10th	
