= Burning Sensation =

EP by SF9
- Released: February 6, 2017
- Genre: K-pop
- Length: 19:01
- Language: Korean
- Labels: FNC Entertainment; LOEN Entertainment

SF9 chronology
Feeling Sensation (2016)	Burning Sensation (2017)	Breaking Sensation (2017)

Singles from Burning Sensation
- 1. "Roar" Released: February 6, 2017

Burning Sensation is the first extended play from South Korean boy band SF9. It was released on February 6, 2017, by FNC Entertainment. The album consists of six tracks, including the title track, "Roar".

== Commercial performance ==
The EP sold 33,997+ copies in South Korea. It peaked at number 3 on the Korean Gaon Chart.

== Track listing ==
Official track list
No.	Title	Lyrics	Music	Arrangements	Length
1.	"Youth;tell me what it is" (靑春;tell me what it is)	Kim Chang-rak; Ye-Yo!	Kim Chang-rak; Ye-Yo!	Ye-Yo!	2:01
2.	"Roar" (부르릉)	Han Seong-ho; Kim Chang-rak; Devil Cat	Erik Lidbom; Kim Chang-rak	Erik Lidbom; Ye-Yo!; Kim Chang-rak	3:07
3.	"Still My Lady" (여전히 예뻐)	Choi Jin-seok; Kim Chang-rak; Jung Jin-wook; Han Kyeong-soo	Choi Jin-seok; Kim Chang-rak	Choi Jin-seok	3:36
4.	"Shut Up N' Lemme Go"	Han Seung-hoon; Lee Sang-ho; Lee Seung-jae	Han Seung-hoon; Lee Sang-ho; Steven Lee	Steven Lee; Lee Sang-ho; Mingky	3:25
5.	"4 Step"	Jang Yeon-jung; 이맑은슬(Jam Factory)	Erik Lidbom; Obi Mhondera; Various Artists	Erik Lidbom	3:39
6.	"Jungle Game"	Misfit	Monster no.9; Sedat Turuc; Andy Roda; Tom Hugo	Monster no.9	3:13
Total length:					19:01
