= RPM Mortgage =

RPM Mortgage, Inc.
- Company type: Incorporated
- Industry: Mortgage
- Founder: Robert Hirt, CEO; Tracey Hirt, President
- Headquarters: Alamo, CA, United States
- Owner: Robert Hirt, CEO; Tracey Hirt, President
- Number of employees: 800+
- Website: RPM Mortgage, Inc.

RPM Mortgage is an independently owned and operated mortgage lender and broker based in Alamo, California. The company’s roots in the Bay Area stem back to 1986.

RPM Mortgage is a retail only lender and a direct seller and servicer of Fannie Mae loans. In 2013, the company provided $5.9 billion in funding in the form of residential mortgages.

== History ==
The company has been rooted in the Bay Area since 1986. In 1991, Rob and Tracey Hirt invested in a small, start-up mortgage company– Residential Pacific Mortgage. In 1996, Rob was awarded the ownership rights to re-acquire Residential Pacific Mortgage, which eventually became RPM Mortgage. Rob has led RPM to become one of the top 15 private, retail mortgage lenders in the U.S. according to the Scotsman Guide 2015 rankings. Since its first evaluation from Standard & Poor's in 2012, RPM remains the only privately owned U.S residential mortgage originator to consistently receive above average ratings across all eight key areas S&P analyzes.

In 2011, the company was sued by the Federal Deposit Insurance Corporation for "breach of contract, negligence and negligent hiring/supervision". They later settled out of court for $550,000.

On 4 June 2015, The Consumer Financial Protection Bureau filed a complaint in federal district court against RPM Mortgage and its CEO, Erwin Robert Hirt, for illegally paying bonuses and higher commissions to loan originators to incentivize them to steer consumers into costlier mortgages, illegally profiting tens of millions of dollars from 2011 to 2013. They were fined $20 million including $18 million as redress to consumers with an additional $2 million as a civil penalty, half of which is to be paid by CEO Robert Hirt. "RPM rewarded its loan officers for steering consumers into mortgages with higher interest rates," said CFPB Director Richard Cordray in a press release. "Today we are putting an end to RPM's unlawful practices and holding Robert Hirt personally responsible for his involvement in them."
