= First Collection =

- Digital cover

Studio album by SF9
- Released: January 7, 2020
- Genre: K-pop
- Length: 33:13
- Languages: Korean; English
- Labels: FNC; Kakao M

SF9 chronology
Illuminate (2019)	First Collection (2020)	9loryUs (2020)

Singles from First Collection
- 1. "Good Guy" Released: January 7, 2020

First Collection is the third studio album by South Korean boy band SF9 It was released on January 7, 2020, by FNC Entertainment. The album consists of ten tracks, including the title track, "Good Guy".

== Commercial performance ==
The album sold 117,785+ copies in South Korea. It peaked at number 2 on the Korean Gaon Chart.

== Track listing ==
No.	Title	Length
1.	"Good Guy"	3:13
2.	"Am I the Only One (나만 그래)"	3:37
3.	"Shh"	3:21
4.	"Lullu Lalla (룰루랄라)"	2:55
5.	"One Love"	3:37
6.	"Like the Hands Held Tight (널 꽉 잡은 손만큼)"	3:30
7.	"Fire (타)"	3:08
8.	"Stop It Now (더 잔인하게)"	3:05
9.	"Dance With Us (춤을 춤 거야)"	3:24
10.	"Beautiful Light"	3:17
Total length:		33:13

== Charts ==
Weekly chart performance for First Collection
Chart (2024)	Peak position
South Korean Albums (Circle)	2
Japan Albums (Oricon)	30
