= Rowoon =

South Korean actor and singer (born 1996)

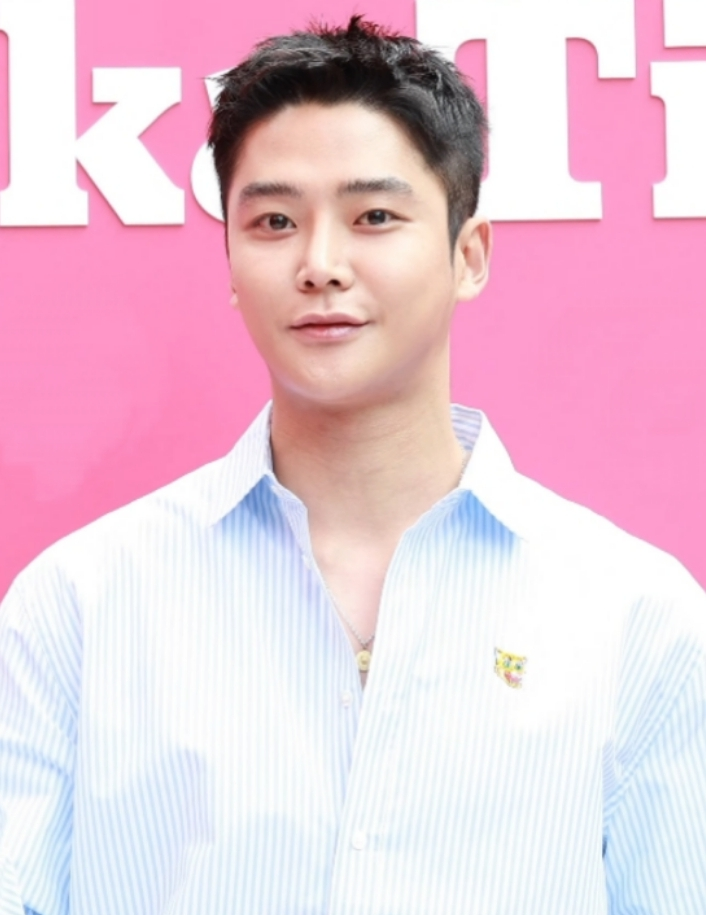
- Rowoon in June 2025
- Born: Kim Seok-woo; August 7, 1996 (age 30); Seoul, South Korea
- Occupations: Actor; singer
- Years active: 2016–present
- Musical career
- Genre: K-pop
- Instrument: Vocals
- Years active: 2016–2023
- Label: FNC
- Formerly of: SF9

Korean name
- Hangul: 김석우
- Hanja: 金錫佑
- RR: Gim Seoku
- MR: Kim Sŏgu

Stage name
- Hangul: 로운
- RR: Roun
- MR: Roun

Kim Seok-woo (Korean: 김석우; born August 7, 1996), better known by his stage name Rowoon, is a South Korean actor and singer. He is a former member of the South Korean boy band SF9. As an actor, he is best known for his roles in television series Extraordinary You (2019) and The King's Affection (2021), where he won several awards for his performance in the series.

== Career ==
=== 2013–2014: Pre-debut ===
Rowoon was introduced as a trainee in FNC Entertainment's reality show Cheongdam-dong 111.

=== 2015–2016: Debut with SF9 ===
In 2015, Rowoon was a part of pre-debut team, "Neoz School", under FNC Entertainment as a member of the group called Neoz. In May 2016, he participated as a member of "Neoz Dance" in FNC Entertainment's survival show d.o.b (Dance or Band), competing against Neoz Band (later known as Honeyst). "Neoz Dance" won the competition with 51% of the votes and received the opportunity to debut. He debuted with group SF9 in October 2016 with the single "Fanfare".

=== 2017–2022: Solo activities and rising popularity ===
Rowoon began his acting career in television series with a minor supporting role in KBS2's School 2017. Following this appearance, he gradually received more significant roles. In March 2018, he was cast as the female lead's brother in tvN's About Time. By July 2018, he secured another role in SBS's Where Stars Land, for which he was nominated for the New Actor award.

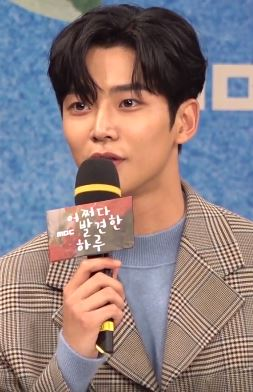
Rowoon at the press conference of Extraordinary You in 2019

On May 9, 2019, Rowoon was confirmed to be the male lead for the first time in MBC's school fantasy drama, Extraordinary You based on the hit Daum webtoon July Found by Chance. After receiving the role of Haru, Rowoon's popularity skyrocketed, launching him into stardom. He was nominated at the MBC Drama Awards with fellow costars, Kim Hye-yoon and Lee Jae-wook, for Best Couple, and was awarded with Best New Actor. Around the same time, Rowoon was featured in NC.A's music video, "Awesome Breeze" (밤바람).

In April 2020, it was revealed that he would be the voice of Branch in the Korean dub of the animated movie Trolls World Tour. In the following month, FNC Entertainment confirmed that Rowoon would star in JTBC drama She Would Never Know, based on the webtoon of the same name. The drama began airing in January 2021.

Rowoon took on the male lead role in the 2021 historical drama The King's Affection. The drama's success led to him winning the Best New Actor award at the KBS Drama Awards. In late 2021, Rowoon became an MC for the 2021 KBS Song Festival along with Astro's Cha Eun-woo and Kim Seol-hyun.

In 2022, Rowoon starred in the MBC fantasy drama Tomorrow where he portrayed the role of Choi Joon-woong.

=== 2023–present: Departure from SF9 and acting work ===
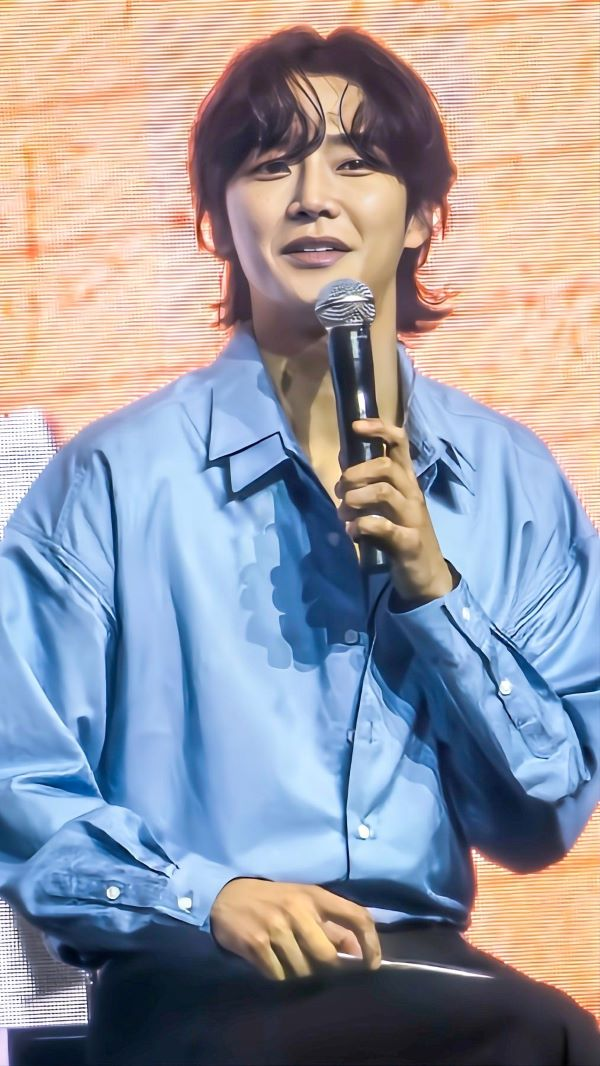
Rowoon in January 2024

In 2023, Rowoon starred in fantasy drama Destined with you which aired on JTBC from August 23 to October 12. During the drama's run, FNC announced that Rowoon would be leaving SF9 to focus on his acting career while remaining with the agency.

Later in 2023, Rowoon was confirmed to star in the historical drama The Matchmakers, which aired on KBS2. His performance in the series earned him the Popularity Award and Top Excellence Award at the 2023 KBS Drama Awards.

On July 3, 2024, it was reported that Rowoon will star in another upcoming historical drama, Takryu.

On March 2, 2025, Rowoon was invited to the 97th Academy Awards at the Dolby Theater in Hollywood, Los Angeles.

== Endorsements ==
In 2020, Rowoon became a brand ambassador for the cosmetics brand Klavuu, Gong Cha Korea, and the 2020 Fall/Winter collection by The North Face's White Label. Endorsements with Estée Lauder, SimplyO hair products, Clean Up Beauty, and the clothing brand ANDZ followed in 2021 and 2022. Derma-skincare brand Ilso selected him as their advertising model in 2023, while Isoi Japan, Samjin Pharmaceuticals (for their total healthcare brand Wisi Healthy), and Oligio Thailand appointed him in 2024.

== Discography ==
=== Soundtrack appearances ===
| Title | Year | Album | Ref. |
|---|---|---|---|
| "No Goodbye In Love" (안녕) | 2021 | The King's Affection OST Part 7 | |

== Filmography ==
=== Film ===
| Year | Title | Role | Notes | Ref. |
|---|---|---|---|---|
| 2020 | Trolls World Tour | Branch | Voice-over for the Korean-dubbed version | |
| 2025 | The Last Man: The Movie – First Love | Clyde Yoon | Japanese film | |

=== Television series ===
| Year | Title | Role | Notes | Ref. |
|---|---|---|---|---|
| 2017 | School 2017 | Kang Hyun-il / Issue | | |
| 2018 | About Time | Choi Wee-jin | | |
| 2018 | Where Stars Land | Ko Eun-sub | | |
| 2019 | Extraordinary You | Ha-ru | | |
| 2021 | She Would Never Know | Chae Hyun-seung | | |
| 2021 | The King's Affection | Jung Ji-woon | | |
| 2022 | Tomorrow | Choi Joon-woong | | |
| 2023 | Destined With You | Jang Shin-yu | | |
| 2023 | The Matchmakers | Shim Jung-woo | | |
| 2025 | The Murky Stream | Jang Si Yul | Main actor | |

=== Web series ===
| Year | Title | Role | Notes | Ref. |
|---|---|---|---|---|
| 2016 | Click Your Heart | Himself | | |
| 2023 | A Time Called You | Tae-ha | Cameo (Episode 8) | |
| 2025 | The Murky Stream | Jang Si-yool | Disney+ | |

=== Television shows ===
| Year | Title | Role | Notes | Ref. |
|---|---|---|---|---|
| 2013–2014 | Cheongdam-dong 111 | Trainee | | |
| 2016 | d.o.b: Dance or Band | | | |
| 2016 | Lipstick Prince | Cast Member | Season 1 | |
| 2017 | Lipstick Prince | Cast Member | Season 2 | |
| 2018 | Law of the Jungle | Cast Member | in Patagonia (Episodes 305–310) | |
| 2018 | King of Mask Singer | Contestant | as Owl (Episode 163) | |
| 2018 | Cafe Amor | Cast Member | with Yoo In-na, Lee Juck, Yang Se-hyung | |
| 2021 | Kingdom: Legendary War | Contestant | with SF9 | |
| 2022 | The Idol Band: Boy's Battle | Host | with Nako Yabuki | |
| 2022 | House on Wheels | Cast Member | Season 4 | |

=== Hosting ===
| Year | Title | Notes | Ref. |
|---|---|---|---|
| 2021 | KBS Song Festival | with Kim Seol-hyun and Cha Eun-woo | |
| 2022 | Music Bank World Tour: Chile | | |
| 2023 | 2023 Music Bank Global Festival Japan | with Go Min-si, and Lee Young-ji | |
| 2023 | 2023 Music Bank Global Festival Korea | with IVE's Jang Won-young | |
| 2023 | 2023 KBS Drama Awards | with Jang Sung-kyu and Seol In-ah | |
| 2024 | 2024 KCON Los Angeles | July 26 only | |

== Accolades ==
=== Awards and nominations ===
Name of the award ceremony, year presented, category, nominee of the award, and the result of the nomination
| Award ceremony | Year | Category | Nominee / Work | Result | Ref. |
|---|---|---|---|---|---|
| APAN Music Awards | 2020 | Entertainer of the Year – Male | Rowoon | Nominated | |
| APAN Star Awards | 2022 | Excellence Award, Actor in a Miniseries | The King's Affection | Nominated | |
| APAN Star Awards | 2022 | Popularity Star Award, Actor | The King's Affection | Nominated | |
| APAN Star Awards | 2023 | Best Couple | Rowoon with Jo Bo-ah; Destined With You | Nominated | |
| APAN Star Awards | 2023 | Global Star | Rowoon | Nominated | |
| APAN Star Awards | 2023 | Popularity Award (Actor) | Rowoon | Nominated | |
| Brand Customer Loyalty Awards | 2021 | Best Male Acting Idol | Rowoon | Nominated | |
| Brand Customer Loyalty Awards | 2022 | Best Male Acting Idol | Rowoon | Won | |
| Brand Customer Loyalty Awards | 2024 | Male Actor (Hot Trend) | Rowoon | Nominated | |
| Brand of the Year Awards | 2020 | Male Actor Idol of the Year | Rowoon | Won | |
| Brand of the Year Awards | 2021 | Male Actor Idol of the Year | Rowoon | Nominated | |
| Dong-A.com's Pick | 2024 | Popularity Award | Rowoon | Won | |
| Grimae Awards | 2019 | Best New Actor | Extraordinary You | Won | |
| KBS Drama Awards | 2021 | Best Couple Award | Rowoon with Park Eun-bin; The King's Affection | Won | |
| KBS Drama Awards | 2021 | Best New Actor | The King's Affection | Won | |
| KBS Drama Awards | 2021 | Popularity Award, Actor | The King's Affection | Won | |
| KBS Drama Awards | 2023 | Best Couple Award | Rowoon with Cho Yi-hyun; The Matchmakers | Won | |
| KBS Drama Awards | 2023 | Popularity Award (Actor) | The Matchmakers | Won | |
| KBS Drama Awards | 2023 | Top Excellence Award (Actor) | The Matchmakers | Won | |
| Korea First Brand Awards | 2019 | Male Idol-Actor Award | Rowoon | Won | |
| Korea First Brand Awards | 2024 | Male Actor (Rising Star) | Rowoon | Won | |
| Marie Claire Asia Star Awards | 2025 | Rising Star Award | The Murky Stream | Won | |
| MBC Drama Awards | 2019 | Best New Actor | Extraordinary You | Won | |
| MBC Drama Awards | 2019 | Best One-minute Couple Award | Rowoon with Kim Hye-yoon and Lee Jae-wook; Extraordinary You | Nominated | |
| MBC Drama Awards | 2022 | Excellence Award, Actor in a Miniseries | Tomorrow | Nominated | |
| SBS Drama Awards | 2018 | Best New Actor | Where Stars Land | Nominated | |
| Soompi Awards | 2018 | Best Idol Actor Award | Where Stars Land | Nominated | |

=== Listicles ===
Name of publisher, year listed, name of listicle, and placement
| Publisher | Year | Listicle | Placement | Ref. |
|---|---|---|---|---|
| Cine21 | 2021 | New Actors that will lead Korean Video Content Industry in 2022 | 5th (Note: Rowoon mentioned together with Kim Seon-ho, Wi Ha-joon, Song Kang, Byeon Woo-seok, and Lee Jun-young) | |
| Forbes | 2024 | 30 Under 30 – Entertainment (Korea) | 1st | |
| Forbes | 2024 | Celebrity – Career High (Korea) | 1st | |
| Forbes | 2024 | Celebrity with Both Talent & Personality (Korea) | 1st | |
| Forbes | 2025 | Who is the celebrity who was born a professional entertainer? | 1st | |
