= Breaking Sensation =

EP by SF9
- Released: April 18, 2017
- Genre: K-pop
- Length: 18:18
- Language: Korean
- Labels: FNC Entertainment; LOEN Entertainment

SF9 chronology
Burning Sensation (2017)	Breaking Sensation (2017)	Knights of the Sun (2017)

Singles from Breaking Sensation
- 1. "Easy Love" Released: April 18, 2017

Breaking Sensation is the second extended play from South Korean boy band SF9. It was released on April 18, 2017, by FNC Entertainment. The album consists of six tracks, including the title track, "Easy Love".

== Commercial performance ==
The EP sold 27,360+ copies in South Korea. It peaked at number 5 on the Korean Gaon Chart.

== Track listing ==
Official track list
No.	Title	Lyrics	Music	Arrangements	Length
1.	"Intro;" (Intro; 이별 즈음에)	Zuho; Youngbin; Hwiyoung; Chani	Kim Chang-rak	Kim Chang-rak	1:31
2.	"Easy Love" (쉽다)	Han Seong-ho; Kim Chang-rak	Hyuk Shin; Jeff Lewis; MRey; Han Seong-ho; Kim Chang-rak	Hyuk Shin; MRey	3:26
3.	"Watch Out"	Han Seong-ho; Kim Chang-rak	Erik Lidbom; MLC; Ye-Yo!	Erik Lidbom; Ye-Yo!	3:14
4.	"Hide and Seek" (머리카락 보일라)	Jung Jun-ho	Erik Lidbom; Andreas Oberg	Erik Lidbom	3:58
5.	"Fall Down" (이러다가 울겠어)	Han Seong-ho	Unik; Casper; Ryan Kim	Unik	3:02
6.	"Why" (왜 이래)	Yoon Hye-ju; Han Kyeong-soo	Kim Chang-rak; Ye-Yo!	Kim Chang-rak; Ye-Yo!	3:07
Total length:					18:18
