= Mamma Mia! (EP) =

EP by SF9
- Released: February 26, 2018
- Genre: K-pop
- Length: 22:05
- Language: Korean
- Label: FNC Entertainment; LOEN Entertainment

SF9 chronology
| Knights of the Sun (2017) | Mamma Mia! (2018) | Sensuous (2018) |

Singles from Mamma Mia!
- 1. "Mamma Mia" Released: February 26, 2018

Mamma Mia! is the fourth extended play from South Korean boy band SF9. It was released on February 26, 2018, by FNC Entertainment. The album consists of six tracks, including the title track, "Mamma Mia".

== Commercial performance ==
The EP sold 11,060+ copies in South Korea. It peaked at number 3 on the Korean Gaon Chart.

== Track listing ==
Official track list
| No. | Title | Lyrics | Music | Arrangements | Length |
|---|---|---|---|---|---|
| 1. | "Mamma Mia" | Han Seon-ho; Kim Chang-rak; Kim Su-bin | Erik Lidbom; Kim Chang-rak; Seo Yong-bae, Kim Su-bin | Erik Lidbom; Kim Su-bin | 3:25 |
| 2. | "Never Say Goodbye" | Choi Hee-jae | Steven Lee; Han Seung-hoon | Steven Lee | 3:46 |
| 3. | "Go back in Time" (시간을 거꾸로) | Kim Do-hoon (RBW); Xepy; Kim Chang-rak | Erik Lidbom; Kim Do-hoon (RBW); Park Su-seok; Xepy; Kim Chang-rak | Park Su-seok | 3:26 |
| 4. | "Be my Baby" | Kim Jae-won (Jam Factory) | Jang Jung-seok; Fredrik Figge Bostrom | Jang Jung-seok | 3:41 |
| 5. | "Midnight Road" | Jang Jung-won (Jam Factory) | Steven Lee; Andreas Stone Johansson; Andreas Oberg; Various Artists | Andreas Stone Johansson | 4:04 |
| 6. | "Dear Fantasy" | SF9 | Han Seung-hoon; Kim Chang-rak; Jung Jin-wook | Jung Jin-wook | 3:43 |
| Total length: | | | | | 22:05 |
