= Knights of the Sun =

EP by SF9
- Released: October 12, 2017
- Genre: K-pop
- Length: 18:59
- Language: Korean
- Label: FNC Entertainment; LOEN Entertainment

SF9 chronology
Breaking Sensation (2017)	Knights of the Sun (2017)	Mamma Mia! (2018)

Singles from Knights of the Sun
- 1. "O Sole Mio" Released: October 12, 2017

Knights of the Sun is the third extended play from South Korean boy band SF9. It was released on October 12, 2017, by FNC Entertainment. The album consists of six tracks, including the title track, "O Sole Mio".

== Commercial performance ==
The EP sold 32,864+ copies in South Korea. It peaked at number 6 on the Korean Gaon Chart.

== Track listing ==
Official track list
No.	Title	Lyrics	Music	Arrangements	Length
1.	"Poetry; 00:00" (詩; 00:00)	Zuho; Youngbin; Hwiyoung; Chani	Kim Chang-rak; Zuho; Youngbin; Hwiyoung; Chani	Kim Chang-rak; Zuho	1:59
2.	"O Sole Mio" (오솔레미오)	Kim Chang-rak; Seo Yong-bae	Kim Chang-rak; Seo Yong-bae	Seo Yong-bae	3:22
3.	"Let's Hang Out" (나랑 놀자)	Kim Chang-rak; Seo Yong-bae	G`harah `PK` Degeddingseze; Jarah Gibson; Kim Chang-rak; Seo Yong-bae	G`harah `PK` Degeddingseze; Jarah Gibson	3:26
4.	"Blank." (빈칸)	Han Seung-hoon; Kim Chang-rak	Steven Lee; Sammy Naja; Jimmy Richard; Han Seung-hoon; Kim Chang-rak	Steven Lee; Sammy Naja; Jimmy Richard	3:53
5.	"Scold" (불호령)	Kim Chang-rak; Zuho; Youngbin; Hwiyoung; Chani	Deryk Mitchell; Jarah Gibson; Kim Chang-rak; Zuho; Youngbin; Hwiyoung	Deryk Mitchell; Jarah Gibson	3:12
6.	"Just On My Way" (웬 감성팔이야)	Han Seung-hoon; Seo Yong-bae	Damon Sharpe; Jimmy Burney; Various Artist; Aston Merrygold; Han Seung-hoon; Seo Yong-bae	Damon Sharpe; Jimmy Burney; Various Artists; Aston Merrygold	3:07
Total length:					18:59
