= Lee Jae-yoon (singer) =

South Korean singer and entertainer

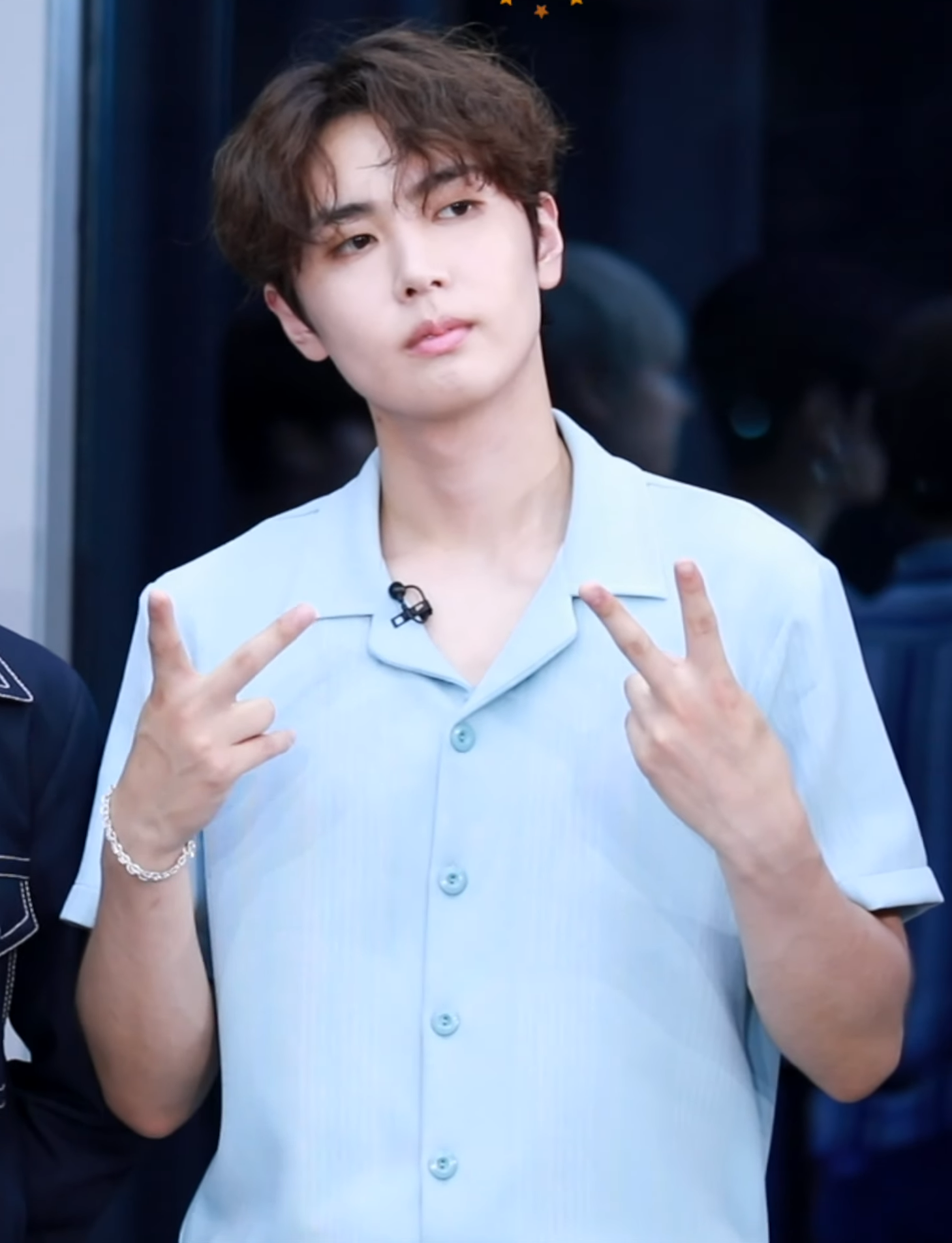
- Lee in June 2019
- Born: August 9, 1994 (age 32); Busan, South Korea
- Education: Dong-Ah Institute of Media and Arts
- Occupations: Singer; dancer; actor
- Years active: 2016–present
- Height: 184 cm (6 ft 0 in)
- Musical career
- Genre: K-pop
- Years active: 2016–present
- Label: FNC
- Member of: SF9

Korean name
- Hangul: 이재윤
- Hanja: 李在允
- RR: I Jaeyun
- MR: I Chaeyun

Lee Jae-yoon (Korean: 이재윤; born August 9, 1994), also known by his stage name Jae Yoon, is a South Korean singer, dancer, actor, and model. He is a member of the South Korean group SF9 as a lead vocalist and dancer. He is known for his vocal range, which he has showcased in solo contributions to various Korean drama original soundtracks (OSTs) and live stage musicals.

Lee trained to be a k-pop idol and performer in the talent company FNC Entertainment's rookie training program Neoz School. In 2016, he competed in the nine-member dance group NEOZ Dance on the Mnet survival reality show d.o.b.: Dance or Band, where he and his group mates competed for a chance to debut as FNC's first boy dance group. They won the competition, and debuted as FNC's first male dance group with the group name SF9 (short for Sensational Feeling 9). They released their first single "Fanfare" on October 5, 2016.

As an actor, Lee began his career as a supporting role in the interactive web drama Click Your Heart (2016), and later played a lead character in the web drama Love in Black Hole (2021). He is best known for his acting in live stage musical productions, including Founded (2021), Another Miss Oh (2022), and Seopyeonje (2022). Lee joined Seopyeonje, a long-running, award-winning South Korean musical, in its final season, garnering media acclaim for his adaptability and growth as a musical actor.

== Career ==
=== 2015-2016: Debut with SF9 ===
In 2015, he was a part of a pre-debut team, "Neoz School", under FNC Entertainment as a member of the group called NEOZ. In May 2016, he participated as a member of "NEOZ Dance" in FNC Entertainment's survival show d.o.b : Dance or Band, competing against NEOZ Band (later known as Honeyst). "NEOZ Dance" won the competition with 51% of the votes and received the opportunity to debut. He debuted with group SF9 on October 5, 2016, with their debut album Feeling Sensation, featuring their first single "Fanfare".

=== 2017-present: Solo projects ===
His voice has been featured on original soundtracks of several South Korea web and television dramas.

In 2016 and 2017, he released two original soundtrack (OST) songs. The song Thank you, My love (also called Dear My Love) was featured in both the web drama Click your Heart (Episode 6, Zu Ho's ending) and the Netflix produced drama My Only Love Song. The song Even If We Meet Again (also called Again, We Meet) was featured in the television series Girls' Generation 1979. In 2021, he released the song My Universe on the OST for the web drama Love in Black Hole, in which he also appeared as a lead character. In 2022, Lee debuted his first self-composed song, Stay with Me, with live solo performances in Seoul during his group SF9's Delight concert tour. Lee later released this song as a solo track on SF9's 12th mini album THE PIECE OF9 in 2023.

As an actor, he is best known for his live acting and performance projects in Seoul, South Korea. In 2021 and 2022, Lee played a lead role in the historical fiction musical Founded. In 2022, he played lead roles in the musicals, Another Miss Oh and Seopyeonje. In 2021 and 2022, Lee also played the role of a 'love clown' in a play called Fantastic Fairy Tale.

Lee's commitment to health and fitness was featured in an interview published in Men's Health Magazine (Korean edition) in February 2021. He was also featured on the magazine cover of the same issue.

== Personal life ==
=== Military service ===
On February 13, 2023, FNC announced that Lee will enter mandatory military service on March 21, 2023, where he attended basic training at the 3rd Infantry Division. He served in the military band of the 3rd Infantry Division Baekgol ("White Skulls") Unit at Cheorwon, Gangwon-do in South Korea until his discharge on September 20, 2024.

== Discography ==
=== Singles ===
Title	Year	Album	Notes/Ref.
"Thank You, My Love" / "Dear My Love" (고마운 내 사랑)	2016	Click Your Heart OST	(Ep. 6, Zu Ho's Ending)
"Thank You, My Love" / "Dear My Love" (고마운 내 사랑)	2017	My Only Love Song OST	
"Even if We Meet Again" (다시 우리 만나도)	2017	Girls' Generation 1979 OST Part 1	
"My Universe" (마이 유니버스)	2021	Love in Black Hole OST	

== Filmography and Live theatre ==
=== Live theatre ===
Year	Title	Role	Theatre	Genre	Ref.
2021–2022	Founded / Startup (창업)	Lee Bang-won (lead role)	SH Art Hall (Seoul)	Musical	
2021–2022	Fantastic Fairy Tale / Fantasy Tale (환상동화)	Love Clown	National Theater of Korea Daloreum Theater (Seoul); Busan Cinema Center Haneul Theater (Busan)	Play	
2022	Oh Hae Young, Again / Another Miss Oh (또 오해영)	Park Do-kyung	Seokyung University Performing Arts Center (Seoul)	Musical	
2022	Seopyeonje (서편제)	Dong Ho (lead role)	BBCH Hall of Gwanglim Art Center (Seoul)	Musical	
2025	Dorian Gray (도리안 그레이)	Dorian Gray (lead role)	Grand Theater of Hongik University's Daehakro Arts Center (Seoul)	Musical	
2026	The Mission: K (더 미션:K)	Underwood	Sejong Center for the Performing Arts Grand Theater (Seoul)	Musical	
2026	Navillera (나빌레라)	Chae-rok	CJ Towol Theater at Seoul Arts Center (Seoul)	Musical	

=== Television series ===
Year	Title	Role	Notes	Ref.
2020	Was It Love?	Himself	(Guest Appearance with SF9, Ep. 6)	

=== Web series ===
Year	Title	Role	Notes	Ref.
2016	Click Your Heart	Himself	Supporting role	
2021	Love in Black Hole	Sung Woon	Lead role	

=== Television shows ===
Year	Title	Role	Notes	Ref.
2016	d.o.b.: Dance or Band	Contestant	Competed as part of SF9	
2020	King of Mask Singer (미스터리 음악쇼 복면가왕)	Contestant (alias: Hapjeong Station Exit 5)	Episodes 239-240, lost to American Hot Dog	
2021	Kingdom: Legendary War	Contestant	Competed as part of SF9, placed 6th	
