= Feeling Sensation =

Single album by SF9
- Released: October 5, 2016
- Genre: K-pop
- Length: 9:59
- Language: Korean
- Label: FNC Entertainment; LOEN Entertainment

SF9 chronology
Feeling Sensation (2016)	Burning Sensation (2017)

Singles from Feeling Sensation
- 1. "Fanfare" Released: October 5, 2016

Feeling Sensation is the first single album from South Korean boy band SF9. It was released on October 5, 2016, by FNC Entertainment. The album consists of three tracks, including the title track, "Fanfare".

== Commercial performance ==
The EP sold 32,322+ copies in South Korea. It peaked at number 6 on the Korean Gaon Chart.

== Track listing ==
Official track list
No.	Title	Lyrics	Music	Arrangements	Length
1.	"Fanfare" (팡파레)	Han Seong-ho; Kim Chang-rak; Lee Ji-eun	Albin Nordqvist; Louise Frick Sveen; Kim Chang-rak	Albin Nordqvist; Louise Frick Sveen	3:14
2.	"K.O."	Bae Jin-young; Innovator	Thomas Sardorf; Ilanguaq Ilang Lumholt; Bruce Fielder	Thomas Sardorf; Ilanguaq Ilang Lumholt; Bruce Fielder	3:36
3.	"Together"	Lee Dong-eun; The Sunday; Kim Se-moon; Innovator	Justin Reinstein	Justin Reinstein	3:09
Total length:					9:59
