= SF9 =

South Korean boy band

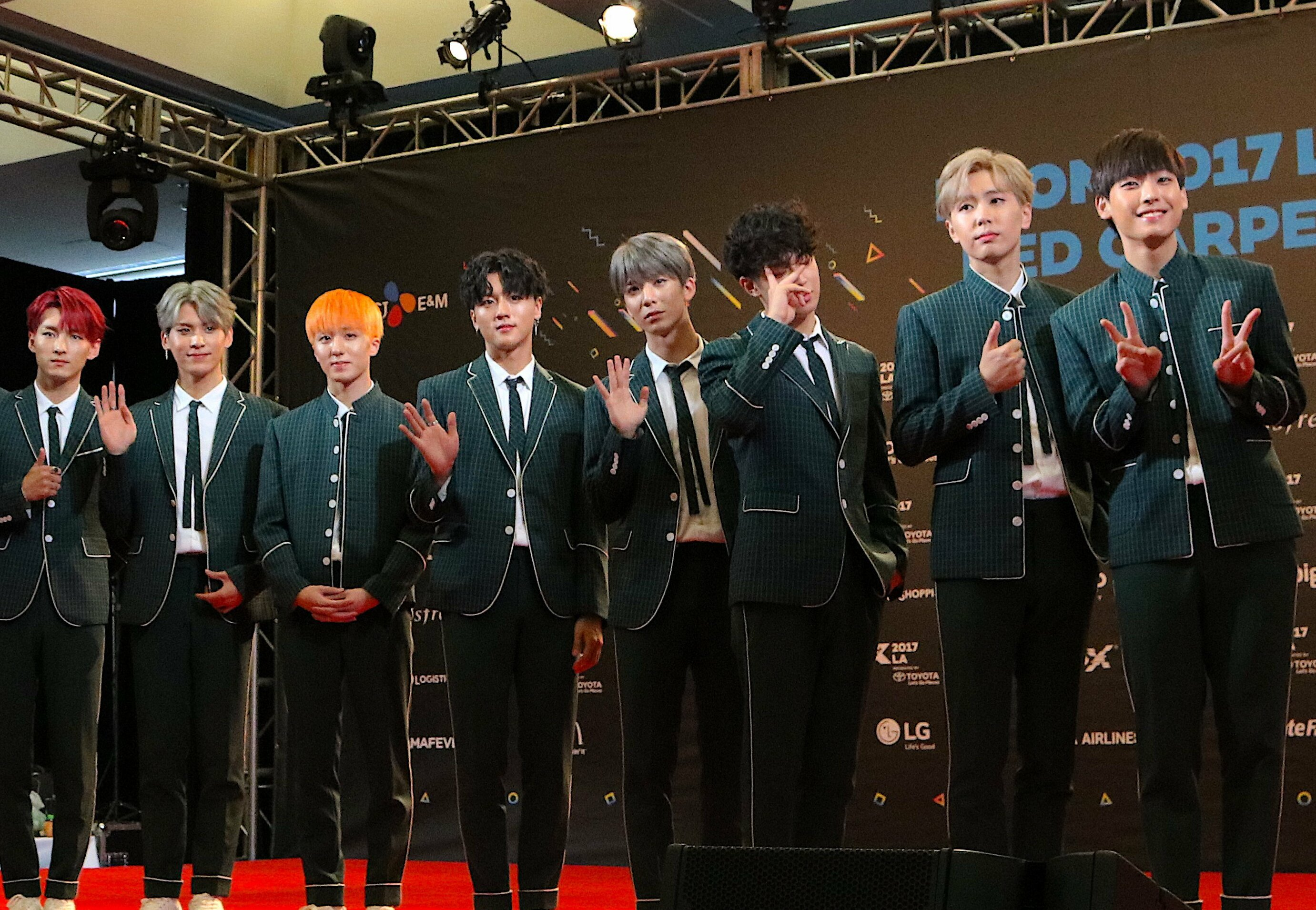
- SF9 in August 2017; L–R: Zuho, Yoo Taeyang, Chani, Youngbin, Hwiyoung, Dawon, Jaeyoon, and Inseong

Background information
- Also known as: 셒구 (Sepgu)
- Origin: Seoul, South Korea
- Genres: K-pop; dance pop; R&B; hip hop
- Years active: 2016–present
- Labels: FNC; Warner Japan
- Members: Inseong; Youngbin; Jaeyoon; Dawon; Zuho; Yoo Taeyang; Hwiyoung; Chani
- Past members: Rowoon
- Website: fncent.com/sf9/

SF9 (Korean: 에스에프나인; shortened from Sensational Feeling 9) is a South Korean boy band formed by FNC Entertainment and the company's first dance boy group. The group is composed of eight members: Inseong, Youngbin, Jaeyoon, Dawon, Zuho, Yoo Taeyang, Hwiyoung, and Chani. Originally a nine-member group, Rowoon left the group on September 18, 2023, to focus on acting. They debuted on October 5, 2016, with the release of their first single album, Feeling Sensation.

== History ==
=== 2015–2016: NEOZ School and debut ===
The group first performed in Japan on December 11, 2015, with 11 members at that time. In May 2016, the nine member participated as NEOZ Dance on the 2016 reality survival d.o.b (Dance or Band), competing against other trainees in NEOZ Band (later known as Honeyst) for the chance to debut as a group. NEOZ Dance later won the show with their first song "K.O.", which was later featured in the Feeling Sensation single album. NEOZ Dance later announced went on to debut as SF9 in August as FNC Entertainment's first dance group.

SF9's debut single album Feeling Sensation with lead single "Fanfare" was released on October 5, 2016. The single debuted at No. 8, and peaked at No. 6 on the Gaon Album Chart. They made their official performance debut on October 6, 2016, on the music program M Countdown. The music video ranked at No. 6 on the Yin Yue Tai weekly chart and ranked seventh on the Yin Yue Tai Monthly Chart. The group wrapped up their debut promotions with "Fanfare" on November 6, 2016, on Inkigayo and would continue their promotions with the B-side track of the single album "K.O." on November 15, 2016.

On December 22, SF9 released special digital single "So Beautiful", originally an OST of their interactive web-drama Click Your Heart.

=== 2017: Japanese debut and commercial success ===
On February 6, 2017, SF9 released their first EP, Burning Sensation. The EP contains tracks, including the lead single "Roar". It landed at number six on the February 15 Billboard World Albums Chart. The Taiwanese version of their EP was released on March 10, which contains seven tracks with addition new Chinese-language single "Still My Lady".

On March 25, SF9 successful held their first fanmeeting "Burning Fantasy" at Sungshin Women University with attended by 600 fans.

On April 7, SF9 held their debut showcase in Japan with attended by 1,300 fans at Tsutaya O-EAST in Shibuya, Tokyo.

On April 18, SF9 released their new EP, titled Breaking Sensation, which contains six track including the lead single "Easy Love". On the same day, the album ranked number two on the U.S. K-Pop Album Chart.

In May, SF9 announced to hold their first concert in Japan, "Fanfare" at Osaka's Jeff Osaka Bayside on August 2 and Tokyo's Toyosu PIT on August 4.

On June 7, SF9 officially debut in Japan with released single "Fanfare", contains Japanese version of "Fanfare", "K.O", "Roar" and the instrumental version of "Fanfare". To commemorate their debut, they held exclusive concert in Tokyo, Nagoya, Kanagawa and Osaka. Their debut single topped number one on Tower Records Chart for single albums and number four on the Oricon Chart.

On August 2, the Japanese version of "Easy Love" was released as their second Japanese single. The single later peaked number four on Oricon's daily single and number one on Tower Records' world chart.

On October 12, the group's third EP, Knights of the Sun, was released. Following the release of their EP, SF9 held a three-stop U.S. solo tour titled "2017 SF9 Be My Fantasy in U.S.A" stopping in Dallas, Seattle, and Boston during November.

Their first Japanese studio album, Sensational Feeling Nine was released on December 13, with composed of ten tracks including the previous single "Fanfare", "Roar", "Easy Love" and the Japanese version of "O Sole Mio" served as the lead single.

=== 2018–2019: Further releases and overseas activities ===
Their fourth EP, Mamma Mia! was released on February 26. The Japanese version of "Mamma Mia!" was released as the third Japanese single on May 23. To promote the single, a Japanese tour titled "SF9 Zepp Tour 2018 MAMMA MIA!" was held in Osaka, Aichi, and Tokyo on May 29, May 30, and June 1, respectively. In August, they held a South American fanmeeting tour.

SF9 returned with the sexy concept for the released of their fifth EP, Sensuous, on July 31. Incorporating with Hip-hop and R&B, the EP consists of five track with the lead single "Now or Never".

On August 23, they held a fanmeeting in Mexico at Auditorio BB of Mexico City and on August 25 and 26 in Brazil at Tropical Butantã of São Paulo. On September 22, they continue to held fanmeeting in Taipei.

On October 27, SF9 held their first domestic concert, "Dreamer", at Yes24 Live Concert Hall.

SF9 released their sixth EP with the Self-love concept titled Narcissus on February 20. The EP contains six-track with the lead single "Enough".

One month later, SF9 released their second Japanese album Illuminate To promote their album, a Japanese tour titled "SF9 2019 ZEPP TOUR "ILLUMINATE" was held in Tokyo, Nagoya and in Namba on April 2, April 4 and 5, respectively.

Following their Japanese Tour, SF9 set out on their "2019 SF9 USA – Europe Live Tour 'UNLIMITED," a ten-stop tour traveling over the United States (Chicago, New York, Atlanta, Los Angeles) and Europe (Moscow, Warsaw, Berlin, Amsterdam, Paris, London).

They were selected as the new CF models for Korean chicken joint Toreore,

On June 17, their seventh EP, RPM, was released with the lead single of the same name. The EP consists of six-track with incooparting of EDM, trap and moombhaton genre.

=== 2020–2021: Mainstream success, contract renewal and competition show ===
SF9 released the worldview trailer of 9lory for their upcoming releases. Their first Korean studio album, First Collection, was released on January 7 with the lead single "Good Guy". The album selling over 100,000 copies of their album, all songs charting on the Melon Realtime Chart, and their music video reaching over 40 million views. On January 16, SF9 took their first ever music show win with "Good Guy" on M Countdown. They also took their 2nd win the next day on Music Bank, which was their first on a major television network. On January 30, they took their 3rd win for the song on M Countdown, with over 10,000 points.

On July 6, SF9 released their eighth EP, 9loryUS, with the lead single "Summer Breeze". They took their first win for "Summer Breeze" on SBS MTV's The Show on July 14. The EP's epilogue video was released as a part of the worldview series 9lory on July 31.

To celebrate SF9's fourth anniversary, they released their special album Special History Book on October 5, consisting of three tracks including the lead single "Shine Together".

At the end of 2020, "Good Guy" was nominated for "Best Dance - Male" at the Melon Music Awards, marking their first ever MMA nomination.

On March 2, 2021, all nine members of SF9 renewed their contracts with FNC Entertainment.

SF9 participated in Kingdom: Legendary War, a competition show alongside five other K-pop boy groups, beginning in April 2021.

On July 5, 2021, SF9 released their ninth EP, Turn Over, with the lead single "Tear Drop". Later that, they also released the epilogue video of the EP and concluded their 9lory worldview series.

Four months later, the prequel of 9lory worldview EP Rumination was released on November 22, with the lead single "Trauma". They took their first win for the song "Trauma" on Music Bank on December 3, with a score of 4971 points.

On December 30, SF9 released the digital single "Savior" through Universe Music for the mobile application, Universe.

=== 2022 - 2024: Military service, OF9 series, Rowoon's departure and Zuho's agency transition ===
From January 21–23, 2022, SF9 had 4 shows of their third solo concert "Live Fantasy 3: IMPERFECT" in the Olympic Hall, Seoul.

On February 5, 2022, it was announced that Inseong would be enlisting for his mandatory military service on March 21, serving as part of the military band. On February 14, it was announced that Youngbin would also be enlisting for his mandatory military service on March 29, serving as an active-duty soldier at the 27th division of the army.

On June 24, 2022, it was announced that Rowoon would not be taking part in the group's promotions for their eleventh EP, The Wave OF9, which was released in July 13, and SF9 made a comeback as a six-member group.

On June 29, 2022, SF9 released their Japanese best album The Best 〜Dear Fantasy〜.

On October 5, 2022, FNC announced that SF9 would be holding a 'Delight Tour' (2022 SF9 LIVE FANTASY #4 DELIGHT TOUR) in five US cities. Starting in Seoul on November 18, New York on the 30th of the same month. and Chicago on December 2.

On December 20, 2022, FNC announced that SF9 would be releasing their twelfth EP, The Piece OF9 on January 9, 2023, with Rowoon rejoining the 6 other members.

On February 13, 2023, FNC announced that Jaeyoon would serve his military service on March 21, where he would attend basic training at the 3rd Infantry Division.

==== Rowoon's departure ====
On September 18, 2023, FNC Entertainment announced that Rowoon would be stepping down from group activities with SF9 in order to concentrate on his growing acting career. Though he would no longer promote as a member of SF9, he remained signed under the agency as an actor. Rowoon, who debuted with the group in 2016 as a vocalist and lead visual, gained significant recognition through his roles in Korean dramas such as Extraordinary You (2019), The King's Affection (2021), and Destined with You (2023). FNC confirmed that SF9 would continue their musical and promotional activities as an eight-member group without Rowoon.

On December 18, 2023, FNC announced that SF9 would be releasing their thirteenth EP, Sequence on January 8, 2024, with Inseong and Youngbin rejoining the group after completing their respective military service.

==== Zuho's agency transition ====
On January 11, 2024, it was announced that Zuho had signed an exclusive contract with Haewadal Entertainment to manage his acting career, while continuing to remain a member of SF9 under FNC Entertainment for group activities. Zuho, who debuted with the group in 2016 as its main rapper, stated that he was thankful to both agencies and committed to continuing both his music and acting activities. Haewadal Entertainment confirmed their support for Zuho's acting career, while FNC clarified that his change in representation applied only to acting, and that he would remain active as a member of SF9.

On August 19, 2024, SF9 released their fourteenth extended play, "Fantasy", as a five-member group. Only Youngbin, Inseong, Taeyang, Hwiyoung, and Chani participated in the album's promotions. Jaeyoon and Dawon were enlisted in the military, and Zuho did not participate in the release due to other commitments. The EP featured five tracks, led by the title track "Don't Worry, Be Happy", and sold over 98,000 copies

=== 2024–present: Lineup changes and recent releases ===
SF9 released their fifteenth extended play, Love Race, on March 11, 2025, with six members actively participating. Member Jaeyoon rejoined the group following the completion of his mandatory military service, while Dawon remained enlisted, and Zuho did not take part in the album's promotions. The EP contained six tracks, including the lead single "Love Race", and sold over 74,000 copies.

==== Solo activities and concerts ====
Member Hwiyoung made his solo debut on June 20, 2024, with the single album Traveling Fish, which featured three self-composed tracks. On November 23, 2024, leader Youngbin held his first solo fan meeting titled "Bohemian", which sold out shortly after ticket sales opened.

On June 21–22, 2025, SF9 held their first solo concert in Seoul in over two years, titled "2025 SF9 LIVE FANTASY #5 – LOVE DAWN", at KBS Arena. The setlist included songs from Love Race and their previous extended play Fantasy, alongside earlier hits such as "RPM", "Good Guy", and "BIBORA".

On July 15, 2025, FNC Entertainment announced that SF9 would embark on the "2025 SF9 LIVE FANTASY #5 – LOVE DAWN" world tour, with performances scheduled across Europe and the United States from October to December 2025. The European leg included cities such as Helsinki, London, and Warsaw, while the U.S. leg covered Boston, New York, Chicago, Houston, Portland and Los Angeles.

== Members ==
Active

- Inseong (인성) – vocalist
- Youngbin (영빈) – leader, rapper, dancer
- Jaeyoon (재윤) – vocalist
- Lee Dawon (다원) – vocalist
- Hwiyoung (휘영) – rapper
- Chani (찬희) – rapper, dancer

Inactive

- Zuho (주호) – rapper (Inactive due to military service)
- Yoo Taeyang (유태양) – vocalist, dancer (Inactive due to military service)

Former

- Rowoon (로운) – vocalist (Left to focus on acting career)

== Discography ==
Korean album

- First Collection (2020)
- Tenacity (2026)

Japanese albums

- Sensational Feeling Nine (2017)
- Illuminate (2019)
- Golden Echo (2020)

== Filmography ==
=== Television drama ===
Year	Title	Notes
2016	Click Your Heart	SF9 Debut Drama
2020	Was It Love?	Cameo Appearance (Ep. 6)

=== Reality shows ===
Year	Show	Episode	Notes
2016	Dance or Band (d.o.b)	8	Survival Show Predebut
2016	Spectacle Fantasy 9	6	Graduation Trip Debut
2016	Special Food 9	6	Debut Show
2017	Something Fun 9	15	
2017	SF9 Trip with Fantasy	9	
2017	SF9 x LieV	1	
2018	Secret Code 9	4	
2018	Colorful Code 9	4	"Now or Never" promotion
2019	League of SF(셒)GENDS	7	
2019	SF9 StarRoad	11	"Enough" promotion
2019	ILOGU SF9	8	"RPM" promotion
2019	Idol league	4	"RPM" promotion
2019	SF9 Sangsa	4	"Good Guy" promotion
2020	Idol league	5	"Good Guy" promotion
2020	League of SF(셒)GENDS2	4	
2020	K-homefeast with SF9	6	"Summer Breeze" promotion
2020	K-Bob Star	4	"Summer Breeze" promotion
2020	Idol League	4	"Summer Breeze" promotion
2020	Idol Dabang	2	"Summer Breeze" promotion
2020	SF9 Sangsa 2	3	Anniversary 4th
2020	SF9 Fandom Tour	8	
2021	Kingdom: Legendary War	10	Survival Show
2021	SF9 Center	18	

== Awards and nominations ==
Name of the award ceremony, year presented, category, nominee of the award, and the result of the nomination
Award ceremony	Year	Category	Nominee / Work	Result	Ref.
Asia Artist Awards	2017	Rookie of the Year	"Fanfare"	Nominated	
Asia Artist Awards	2017	Popularity Award	"Fanfare"	Nominated	
Asia Artist Awards	2018	Rising Star Award	"Now or Never"	Won	
Asia Artist Awards	2020	Male Singer Popularity Award	SF9	Nominated	
Asia Artist Awards	2021	Male Idol Group Popularity Award	SF9	Nominated	
Brand of the Year Awards	2020	Best Male Group	SF9	Nominated	
Fandom School Awards	2017	Best Rookie Award	SF9	Won	
Gaon Chart Music Awards	2017	Rookie of the Year	SF9	Nominated	
Gaon Chart Music Awards	2020	Global Choice Awards	SF9	Nominated	
Gaon Chart Music Awards	2021	Global Choice Awards	SF9	Nominated	
Hanteo Music Awards	2021	Whos Fandom Award	SF9	Nominated	
Hanteo Music Awards	2021	Male Group Artist Award	SF9	Nominated	
Hanteo Music Awards	2023	Global Artist Award – China	SF9	Won	
K Global Heart Dream Awards	2022	K Global Best Music Video Award	SF9	Won	
Korean First Brand Awards	2018	Male Idol of 2018	SF9	Nominated	
Korean First Brand Awards	2018	Rising Star of 2018	SF9	Nominated	
Korean First Brand Awards	2019	Male Idol of 2019	SF9	Nominated	
Melon Music Awards	2020	Best Dance – Male	"Good Guy"	Nominated	
Mnet Asian Music Awards	2016	Best New Male Artist	SF9	Nominated	
Mnet Asian Music Awards	2016	Artist of the Year	SF9	Nominated	
Mnet Asian Music Awards	2021	Worldwide Fans Choice Top 10	SF9	Nominated	
Seoul City Government <I•SEOUL•U>	2018	Honorary Plaque of Appreciation	SF9	Won	
Seoul Music Awards	2017	New Artist Award	SF9	Nominated	
Seoul Music Awards	2017	Bonsang Award	SF9	Nominated	
Seoul Music Awards	2017	Popularity Award	SF9	Nominated	
Seoul Music Awards	2017	Hallyu Special Award	SF9	Nominated	
Seoul Music Awards	2018	Bonsang Award	SF9	Nominated	
Seoul Music Awards	2018	Popularity Award	SF9	Nominated	
Seoul Music Awards	2018	Hallyu Special Award	SF9	Nominated	
Seoul Success Awards	2017	Rookie of the Year	SF9	Won	
The Fact Music Awards	2021	IDOLLIVE Popularity Award	SF9	Nominated	
