= Was It Love? =

2020 South Korean television series

- Promotional poster
- Hangul: 우리, 사랑했을까
- Lit.: Did We Love
- RR: Uri, saranghaesseulkka
- MR: Uri, saranghaessŭlkka
- Genre: Romantic drama; Romantic comedy; Slice of life
- Created by: JTBC
- Written by: Lee Sung-jin
- Directed by: Kim Do-hyung
- Starring: Song Ji-hyo; Son Ho-jun; Song Jong-ho; Kim Min-jun; Koo Ja-sung; Kim Da-som
- Country of origin: South Korea
- Original language: Korean
- No. of episodes: 16

Production
- Producers: Park Jun-seo; Park Min-young
- Running time: 70 minutes
- Production companies: JTBC Studios; Gill Pictures

Original release
- Network: JTBC
- Release: July 8 – September 2, 2020

Was It Love? (Korean: 우리, 사랑했을까) is a South Korean television series starring Song Ji-hyo, Son Ho-jun, Song Jong-ho, Kim Min-jun, Koo Ja-sung and Kim Da-som. It aired on JTBC from July 8 to September 2, 2020; each episode was released on Netflix in South Korea and internationally after their television broadcast.

== Synopsis ==
Noh Ae-jung (Song Ji-hyo) is a single mother with a strong survival instinct who has been single for 14 years. All of a sudden, four men who appeal to her in different ways appear in her life. She had past friendships and relationships with three out of four of these men before her pregnancy. Oh Dae-oh (Son Ho-jun) is a bad but attractive man, Ryu Jin (Song Jong-ho) is pathetic but a handsome and rich actor, Goo Pa-do (Kim Min-jun) who is scary and sexy, and Oh Yeon-woo (Koo Ja-sung) who is a flirty younger man.

== Cast ==
=== Main ===
- Song Ji-hyo as Noh Ae-jung / Tan Ziyi
  - Noh Ae-jung is a film producer who has been struggling while raising her child on her own for 14 years. When four men appear in her life, they reawaken her sense of self.
  - Tan Ziyi is Dong-chan's mother and the wife of a Hong Kong gang leader.
- Son Ho-jun as Oh Dae-oh / Cheon Eok-man

A bestselling novelist as well as a screenwriter who writes for Hollywood movies, but his real self is hidden behind a veil.

- Song Jong-ho as Ryu Jin

An actor with the nickname Nation's Male Friend. When he was at university, he majored in theater and film. His popularity rapidly increased.

- Kim Min-jun as Koo Pa-do

CEO of a financial company called Nine Capital. He is Dong-chan's adoptive father and is a former gangster who started a new life and earned the nickname "Robin Hood of the private loan industry".

- Koo Ja-sung as Oh Yeon-woo

A physical education instructor. His good looks and charming smile make him one of the most popular teachers at school.

- Kim Da-som as Joo Ah-rin

A top star actress.

=== Supporting ===
- Kim Mi-kyung as Choi Hyang-ja, Noh Ae-jung's mother.
- Uhm Chae-young as Noh Ha-nee, Noh Ae-jung's daughter
- Kim Young-ah as Kang Suk-hee, owner of SuKey Bar; Noh Ae-jung's friend and landlady.
- Baek Soo-hee as Choi Hye-jin, a first-year producer at Thumb Film Studio.
- Kim Byung-choon as Mr. Wang, CEO of Thumb Film Studio.
- Jin Hee-kyung as Joo Bo-hye, Oh Yeon-woo's mother.
- Oh Hee-joon as Do Gwang-soo, Ah-rin's manager.
- Yoon Seong-woo as Koo Dong-chan, Pa-do's son and Ha-nee's friend.
- Lee Kyo-yeob as Director Kim
- Lee Hwa-ryong as Myeong Kwae-nam, Ryu Jin's manager.
- Seo Jeong-yeon as Jennifer Song, CEO of Ryu Jin's agency Ssong Entertainment.
- Bae In-hyuk as Novel swordsman

=== Special appearances ===
- Kim Kwang-gyu as Hong Pyeon, editor-in-chief (Ep. 2-5, 16)
- Kim Ji-min as Cheon Eok-man's book concert MC (Ep. 2)
- Hong Yoon-hwa as Ryu Jin's radio show DJ (Ep. 4)
- SF9 as themselves (Ep. 6)
- Ahn Suk-hwan as island resident (Ep. 8-9)

== Viewership ==
Was It Love? : South Korea viewers per episode (thousands)

Season	Episode number																Average
Season	1	2	3	4	5	6	7	8	9	10	11	12	13	14	15	16	Average
1	N/A	N/A	516	560	N/A	N/A	N/A	N/A	N/A	N/A	N/A	N/A	N/A	N/A	N/A	N/A	N/A

Source: Audience measurement performed nationwide by Nielsen Korea.

Average TV viewership ratings
Ep.	Original broadcast date	Average audience share (Nielsen Korea)
Ep.	Original broadcast date	Nationwide
1	July 8, 2020	2.003% (NR)
2	July 9, 2020	2.202% (NR)
3	July 15, 2020	2.084% (NR)
4	July 16, 2020	2.008% (NR)
5	July 22, 2020	2.048% (NR)
6	July 23, 2020	1.777% (NR)
7	July 29, 2020	2.147% (NR)
8	July 30, 2020	2.045% (NR)
9	August 5, 2020	1.826% (NR)
10	August 6, 2020	1.648% (NR)
11	August 12, 2020	2.007% (NR)
12	August 13, 2020	1.882% (NR)
13	August 19, 2020	1.660% (NR)
14	August 20, 2020	1.790% (NR)
15	August 27, 2020	1.973% (NR)
16	September 2, 2020	1.649% (NR)
Average		1.922%
In the table above, the blue numbers represent the lowest ratings and the red numbers represent the highest ratings.; This drama aired on a cable channel/pay TV which normally has a relatively smaller audience compared to free-to-air TV/public broadcasters (KBS, SBS, MBC and EBS).; On August 26, 2020, the broadcast was canceled in order to air special news coverage on Typhoon Bavi.
