= Honeyst =

South Korean band

- Origin: Seoul, South Korea
- Genres: Pop rock
- Years active: 2017–2019
- Labels: FNC
- Past members: Oh Seung-seok; Kim Chul-min; Seo Dong-sung; Kim Hwan
- Website: fncent.com/HONEYST

Honeyst (Korean: 허니스트; RR: Heoniseuteu) was a South Korean pop rock band formed by FNC Entertainment in 2017. The band consists of Oh Seung-seok (drummer), Kim Chul-min (main vocalist, guitarist, keyboardist), Seo Dong-sung (leader, vocalist, bassist), and Kim Hwan (guitarist, vocalist). Their debut single album Like You was released on May 17, 2017. On April 26, 2019, they disbanded after only two years of activity.

== History ==
=== Pre-debut and NEOZ School ===
In May 2016, the four members participated as "NEOZ Band" on the Mnet reality survival show d.o.b. (dance or band), competing against other trainees in "NEOZ Dance" for the chance to debut. In the final episode on June 29, 2016, "NEOZ Band" eventually lost to "NEOZ Dance" who won the public voting and debuted as SF9.

In May 2017, FNC Entertainment announced that the four members would debut as Honeyst (a combination of the words "Honey" and "Artist") and would pursue an acoustic vibe.

=== 2017–2019: Debut with Like You, Someone to Love and disbandment ===
Honeyst made their official debut with single album Like You on May 17, 2017. The single consists of three track with the lead single "Like You". The single debuted at twenty-two on the Gaon Album Chart. On November 22, Honeyst released their second single album Someone to Love.

On April 26, 2019, FNC announced that HONEYST would be disbanding due to creative differences.

== Members ==
- Oh Seung-seok (오승석) – drummer.
- Kim Chul-min (김철민) – main vocalist, guitarist, keyboardist.
- Seo Dong-sung (서동성) – leader, vocalist, bassist.
- Kim Hwan (김환) – guitarist, vocalist.

== Discography ==
=== Single albums ===
Title	Album details	Peak chart positions	Sales
Title	Album details	KOR	Sales
Like You	Released: May 17, 2017; Label: FNC Entertainment; Format: Digital download; Track listing: 1. Like You (반하겠어); 2. My Girl; 3. Be With You (감정)	22	KOR: 2,280+
Someone to Love	Released: November 22, 2017; Label: FNC Entertainment; Format: Digital download; Track listing: 1. Someone to Love (연애하고싶은데요); 2. Tik Tok; 3. Feel So Good	34	KOR: 1,011+

=== Singles ===
Title	Year	Album
"Like You" (반하겠어)	2017	Like You
"Someone to Love" (연애하고싶은데요)	2017	Someone to Love
