= FNC Entertainment =

South Korean entertainment company

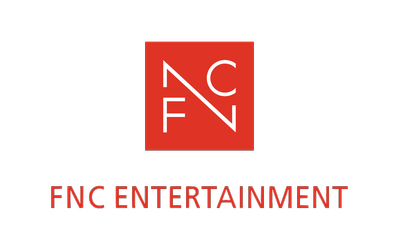
- Native name: 에프엔씨엔터테인먼트; FNC 엔터테인먼트
- Formerly: FNC Music (2006–2012)
- Type: Public
- Traded as: KRX: 173940
- Industry: Entertainment
- Genre: K-pop; R&B; Dance; Ballad; Dance-pop; Rock
- Founded: 14 December 2006
- Founder: Han Seong-ho
- Headquarters: Seoul, South Korea
- Area served: Worldwide
- Key people: Han Seong-ho (Founder and Chairman); Ahn Seok-joon (CEO); Han Seung-hoon (CEO, Han Seong-ho's brother); Cho Sung-wan (President); Kim Yong-sung (Director)
- Services: Music production; Licensing; Artists Management
- Owner: Han Seong-ho (22.34%); Suning Universal (20.53%); Han Seung-hoon (8.19%); Others (48.94%)
- Subsidiaries: See list
- Website: fncent.com

FNC Entertainment (Korean: FNC 엔터테인먼트; stands for "fish and cake") is a South Korean entertainment company established in 2006 by South Korean singer and record producer Han Seong-ho. The company operates as a record label, talent agency, music production company, event management and concert production company, and music publishing house. Since January 2012, the company has been based in its offices in Cheongdam-dong.

The name is based on the miracle of feeding the multitude using only five loaves and the two fish. Han, a devout Christian says he uses the name to hope for more miracles to happen for the company.

The label is home to musical artists such as rock bands F.T. Island, CNBLUE, and N.Flying, and K-pop groups SF9, P1Harmony, and Ampers&One. It also manages a number of entertainers, including Lee Guk-joo and Moon Se-yoon, and a number of actors, including Jung Hae-in, Lee Dong-gun, Sung Hyuk, and Rowoon.

== Artists ==
FNC Entertainment entrance

=== Recording artists ===
==== Soloists ====
- Hong-gi (F.T. Island)
- Yonghwa (CNBLUE)
- J.Don (N.Flying)
- Hwiyoung (SF9)
- Inseong (SF9)
- Chuei Liyu (Flare U)

==== Groups ====
- F.T. Island
- CNBLUE
- N.Flying
- SF9
- P1Harmony
- Ampers&One
- AxMxP
- Flare U

==== Sub-units ====
- F.T. Triple

==== Actors and actresses ====
- Baek Zuho
- Cha Hun
- Choi Min-hwan
- Choi Yu-ju
- Jung Hae-in
- Jung Yong-hwa
- Kang Chani
- Kang Min-hyuk
- Kang Seol
- Kim Bo-ra
- Kim Hwi-young
- Kim In-seong
- Kim Jae-hyun
- Kim Sae-yeon
- Kim Seo-ha
- Kim Seo-yeon
- Youngbin
- Lee Dawon
- Lee Dong-gun
- Lee Hong-gi
- Lee Jae-jin
- Lee Jae-yoon
- Lee Jung-shin
- Lee Seung-hyub
- Moon Seong-hyun
- Park Chae-rin
- Park Hyun-jung
- Park Ji-won
- Park Kwang-jae
- Rowoon
- Seo Dong-sung
- Sung Hyuk
- Yoo Hwe-seung
- Yoo Tae-yang

==== Entertainers ====
- Choe Seong-min
- Chung Da-eun
- Jeong Ho-chul
- Jo Woo-jong
- Lee Guk-joo
- Lee Hyung-taik
- Moon Ji-ae
- Moon Se-yoon
- Yoo Jae-pil

=== FNC Entertainment Japan ===
- Prikil
- Hi-Fi Un!corn

== Former artists ==
=== Former recording artists ===
- M Signal
- F.T. Island
  Oh Won-bin (2007–2009)
  Choi Jong-hoon (2007–2019)
  Song Seung-hyun (2009–2019)
- Juniel (2011–2016)
- CNBLUE
  Lee Jong-hyun (2009–2019)
- AOA
  Park Cho-a (2012–2017)
  Kwon Mina (2012–2019)
  Seo Yu-na (2012–2021)
  Shin Ji-min (2012–2022)
  Kim Seol-hyun (2012–2022)
  Shin Hye-jeong (2012–2023)
  Im Do-hwa (2012–2024)
- AOA Black
  Youkyung (2012–2016)
- N.Flying
  Kwon Kwang-jin (2013–2018)
- Honeyst (2017–2019)
- Cherry Bullet (2019–2024)
  - Mirae (2019)
  - Kokoro (2019)
  - Linlin (2019)
  - Haeyoon (2019–2024)
  - Jiwon (2019–2024)
  - Remi (2019–2024)
  - May (2019–2024)
- Innovator

=== Former actors and actresses ===
- Han Eun-seo
- Huh Ji-won (2019–2024)
- Jin Seo-yul
- Jin Ye-ju
- Jo Jae-yoon (2014–2019)
- Jung Eugene (2018–2022)
- Jung Hye-sung (2015–2018)
- Jung Jin-young (2015–2022)
- Jung Woo (2015–2019)
- Kim Chul-min
- Kim Min-seo (2014–2017)
- Kim Won-hee
- Kwak Dong-yeon (2012–2020)
- Kwon Da-hyun
- Kwon Mina (2012–2019)
- Lee Chae Yun
- Lee Da-hae (2014–2016)
- Lee Elijah (2016–2017)
- Lee Hae-woo
- Lee Seung-joo
- Lee Se-young (2017–2019)
- Park Doo-sik (2016–2019)
- Park Gwang-hyun
- Shin Hye Jeong
- Shin Ian
- Shin Yi June
- Yoon Jin-seo (2012–2020)

=== Former entertainers ===
- Jeong Hyeong-don (2015–2021)
- Ji Suk-jin (2015–2016)
- Kim Ah-yoon
- Kim Yong-man (2015–2021)
- Noh Hong-chul (2015–2024)
- Song Eun-i (2012–2019)
- Yoo Jae-suk (2015–2021)

== Filmography ==
=== Drama ===
Title	Year	Notes
Thank You, My Son	2015	Produced by its subsidiary FNC Add Culture
Who Are You: School 2015	2015	Produced by its subsidiary FNC Add Culture
Click Your Heart	2016	Produced by its subsidiary FNC Add Culture
Becky's Back	2016	Produced by its subsidiary FNC Add Culture
Band of Sisters	2017	Produced by its subsidiary FNC Add Culture
My Only Love Song	2017	Produced by its subsidiary FNC Add Culture
Sweet Enemy	2017	Produced by its subsidiary FNC Add Culture
Lingerie Girls' Generation	2017	Produced by its subsidiary FNC Add Culture with Signal Entertainment Group
Jinx	2021	FNC Story with Kakao Entertainment, Studio S, and MAYS Entertainment
Spring of Youth	2025	with Studio S and Monster Union

=== Variety ===
Title	Year	Notes
Weekly Idol (Season 1)	2011	
Carefree Travellers	2016	
Idol Room	2018	
Problem Child in House	2018	with KBS Entertainment Production

=== Film ===
Title	Director	Year	Notes	Ref.
P1H: The Beginning of a New World	Yoon Hong-Seung	2020	with Chang Pictures, distributed by Lotte Entertainment and KakaoTV	

== Ownership ==
As of June 2016, FNC Entertainment's stocks are owned by the following individuals and/or companies:

Shareholder	Type	Country	Share	Reference
Han Seong-ho	Individual (founder and CEO)	(South Korea)	22.02%	
Suning Universal Media	Company (SZSE: 000718)	(China)	22.00%	
Han Seung-hoon	Individual (Han Seong-ho's brother)	(South Korea)	8.78%	
Kakao M	Company (KRX: 016170)	(South Korea)	▼5.14% → 0.02%	
Kim Soo-il	Individual (Han Seong-ho's wife, CEO of ONE Company)	(South Korea)	3.36%	

== Subsidiaries ==
- FNC Entertainment Japan
- FNC Global Training Center
- Love FNC Foundation (official CSR arm)
- FNC Story
- FNC B (joint venture with HOW Entertainment)
- FNC Investment
- FNC Production, previously known as Genie Pictures

== Discontinued subsidiaries ==
- FNC Academy (acquired by FNC Entertainment in 2024)
- SM Life Design Group (formerly FNC Add Culture, acquired in 2016; acquired by SM Entertainment in 2018)
- Film Boutique (acquired in 2017; acquired by HB Entertainment in 2019)
- FNC W (acquired by FNC Entertainment in 2024)
